= Naudain =

Naudain is a surname. Notable people with the surname include:

- Arnold Naudain (1790–1872), American physician and politician
- May Naudain (1880–1923), American actress and singer

== See also ==
- Naudin
