= Tibouchina albescens =

Scientific classification
- Kingdom: Plantae
- Clade: Tracheophytes
- Clade: Angiosperms
- Clade: Eudicots
- Clade: Rosids
- Order: Myrtales
- Family: Melastomataceae
- Genus: Tibouchina
- Species: T. albescens

Binomial name
- Tibouchina albescens Cogn. ex P.J.F.Guim., A.L.F.Oliveira & R.Romero

Species of flowering plant

Tibouchina albescens is a species of flowering plant in the family Melastomataceae, native to Bolivia and Brazil. It was first formally described in 2015.

== Description ==
Tibouchina albescens is a shrub similar to T. verticillaris, but has membranaceously peeling bark which reveals a white or silver wood underneath; there are also differences in the shape and density of trichomes and indumentum.

== Taxonomy ==
The name Tibouchina albescens was first used in 1908, by Auguste Glaziou, who attributed the name to Alfred Cogniaux. However, it was not validly published, as there was no description or diagnosis. The name was validated in 2015.

== Distribution and habitat ==
Tibouchina albescens is native to Bolivia and Brazil. In Brazil, it is found in the states of Goiás, Mato Grosso and Tocantins. It is found on rocky outcrops in the cerrado and campos rupestres at elevations between 600 and 1,400 metres, including in the Chapada dos Veadeiros National Park.
