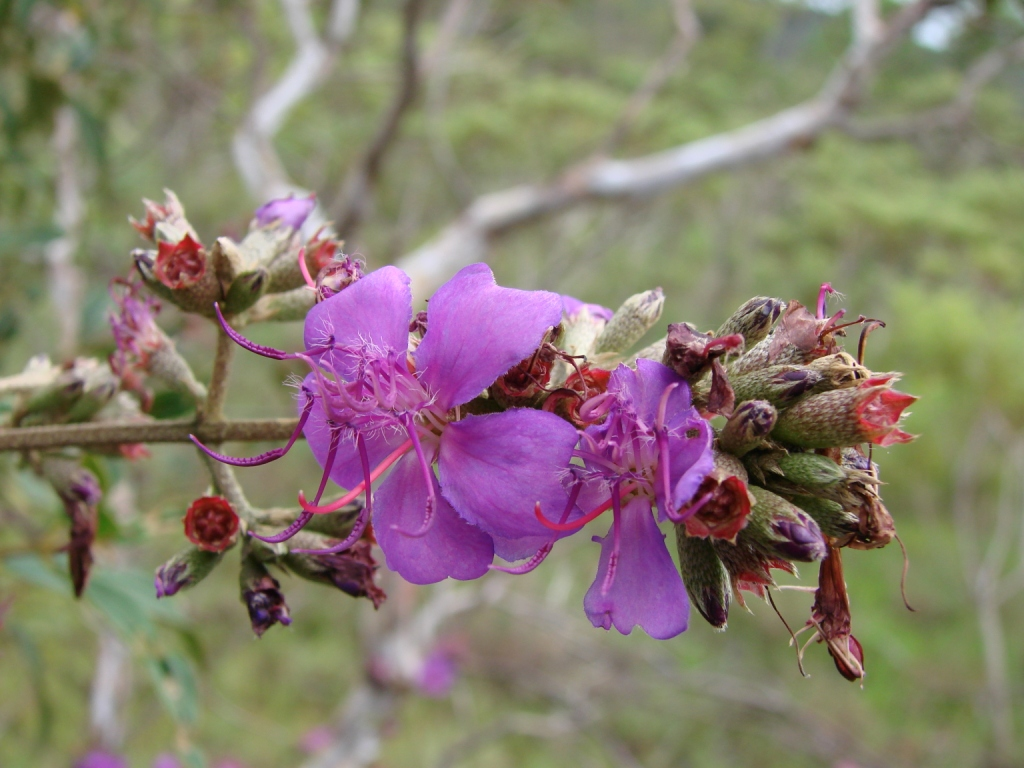
- Tibouchina papyrus

Scientific classification
- Kingdom: Plantae
- Clade: Tracheophytes
- Clade: Angiosperms
- Clade: Eudicots
- Clade: Rosids
- Order: Myrtales
- Family: Melastomataceae
- Genus: Tibouchina; Aubl.

Type species
- Tibouchina aspera Aubl.

Species
- See text.

Synonyms
- Bractearia DC. ex Steud.; Gynomphis Raf.; Savastania Scop.

= Tibouchina =

Genus of flowering plants

Tibouchina /ˌtɪbuːˈkaɪnə/ is a neotropical flowering plant genus in the family Melastomataceae. Species of this genus are subshrubs, shrubs or small trees and typically have purple flowers. They are native to Mexico, the Caribbean, and South America where they are found as far south as northern Argentina. Members of this genus are known as glory bushes, glory trees or princess flowers. The name Tibouchina is adapted from a Guianan indigenous name for a member of this genus. A systematic study in 2013 showed that as then circumscribed the genus was paraphyletic, and in 2019 the genus was split into a more narrowly circumscribed Tibouchina, two re-established genera Pleroma and Chaetogastra, and a new genus, Andesanthus.

== Description ==
Tibouchina species are subshrubs, shrubs or small trees. Their leaves are opposite, usually with petioles, and often covered with scales. The inflorescence is a panicle or some modification of a panicle with reduced branching. The individual flowers have five free petals, purple or lilac in color; the color does not change as the flowers age. There are ten stamens, either all the same or dimorphic, with five larger and five smaller ones. The connective tissue below the anthers of the stamens is prolonged and modified at the base of the stamens into ventrally bilobed appendages. When mature, the seeds are contained in a dry, semiwoody capsule and are cochleate (spiralled).

== Taxonomy ==
The genus Tibouchina was established by Aublet in 1775 in his Flora of French Guiana with the description of a single species, T. aspera, which is thus the type species. In 1885, in his treatment for Flora brasiliensis, Alfred Cogniaux used a broad concept of the genus, transferring into it many of the species at that time placed in Chaetogastra, Diplostegium, Lasiandra, Pleroma and Purpurella, among others. This broad concept was generally adopted subsequently, and around 470 taxa were at one time or another assigned to Tibouchina.

=== Phylogeny ===
A phylogenetic analysis in 2013 based on molecular data (2 plastid and 1 nuclear regions) determined that the traditional circumscription of Tibouchina was paraphyletic. Four major clades were resolved within the genus which were supported by morphological, molecular and geographic evidence. Based on the traditional code of nomenclature, the clade that the type species falls in retains the name of the genus; therefore, the clade containing Tibouchina aspera remains Tibouchina.

A further molecular phylogenetic study in 2019 used the same molecular markers but included more species. It reached the same conclusion: the original broadly circumscribed Tibouchina consisted of four monophyletic clades. The authors proposed a split into four genera: a more narrowly circumscribed Tibouchina, two re-established genera Pleroma and Chaetogastra, and a new genus, Andesanthus. The relationship between Chaetogastra and the genus Brachyotum differed between a maximum likelihood analysis and a Bayesian inference analysis: the former found Brachyotum embedded within Chaetogastra, the latter found the two to be sisters. The part of their maximum likelihood cladogram which includes former Tibouchina species is as follows, using their genus names and with shading added to show the original broadly circumscribed Tibouchina s.l.:

- - - Tibouchina s.s.
    - Pleroma
  - - clade 1 (other genera)
    - clade 2 (other genera)
    - - Andesanthus
      - Chaetogastra / Brachyotum

As re-circumscribed, Tibouchina is monophyletic and contains species belonging to the traditional sections T. section Tibouchina and T. section Barbigerae. Diagnostic characteristics include the presence of scale-like trichomes on the hypanthium and leaves and a long pedoconnective on lilac anthers, and the absence of glandular trichomes. Species are found in savanna habitats.

=== Species ===
As of May 2022, Plants of the World Online accepts the following species within Tibouchina:

- Tibouchina aegopogon (Naudin) Cogn.
- Tibouchina albescens Cogn. ex P.J.F.Guim., A.L.F.Oliveira & R.Romero
- Tibouchina alpestris Cogn.
- Tibouchina araguaiensis P.J.F.Guim.
- Tibouchina aspera Aubl.
- Tibouchina barbigera (Naudin) Baill.
- Tibouchina bicolor (Naudin) Cogn.
- Tibouchina bipenicillata (Naudin) Cogn.
- Tibouchina brevisepala Cogn.
- Tibouchina bruniana P.J.F.Guim.
- Tibouchina caatingae J.G.Freitas
- Tibouchina calycina Cogn.
- Tibouchina catharinae Pittier
- Tibouchina cujabensis Cogn.
- Tibouchina dissitiflora Wurdack
- Tibouchina duidae Gleason
- Tibouchina edmundoi Brade
- Tibouchina exasperata (Naudin) Cogn.
- Tibouchina fraterna N.E.Br.
- Tibouchina huberi Wurdack
- Tibouchina itatiaiae Cogn.
- Tibouchina johnwurdackiana Todzia
- Tibouchina karstenii Cogn.
- Tibouchina lithophila Wurdack
- Tibouchina lepidota P.J.F.Guim. & Michelang.
- Tibouchina llanorum Wurdack
- Tibouchina mathaei Cogn.
- Tibouchina melastomoides (Naudin) Cogn.
- Tibouchina nigricans Cogn. ex P.J.F.Guim., A.L.F.Oliveira & R.Romero
- Tibouchina octopetala Cogn.
- Tibouchina papyrus (Pohl) Toledo
- Tibouchina pogonanthera (Naudin) Cogn.
- Tibouchina rosanae P.J.F.Guim. & Woodgyer
- Tibouchina sickii Brade
- Tibouchina sipapoana Gleason
- Tibouchina spruceana Cogn.
- Tibouchina steyermarkii Wurdack
- Tibouchina striphnocalyx (DC.) Pittier
- Tibouchina verticillaris Cogn.
- Tibouchina xochiatencana de Santiago

=== Selected former species ===
Species placed in Tibouchina in its former broad sense include:

- Tibouchina anderssonii Wurdack, synonym of Chaetogastra anderssonii
- Tibouchina asperior (Cham.) Cogn., synonym of Pleroma asperius
- Tibouchina campii Wurdack, synonym of Chaetogastra campii
- Tibouchina ciliaris (Vent.) Cogn., synonym of Chaetogastra ciliaris
- Tibouchina clinopodifolia (DC.) Cogn., synonym of Chaetogastra clinopodifolia
- Tibouchina elegans Cogn., synonym of Pleroma elegans
- Tibouchina francavillana Cogn., synonym of Pleroma francavillanum
- Tibouchina gleasoniana Wurdack, synonym of Andesanthus gleasonianus
- Tibouchina granulosa, synonym of Pleroma granulosum
- Tibouchina gracilis (Bonpl.) Cogn., synonym of Chaetogastra gracilis
- Tibouchina grossa, synonym of Chaetogastra grossa
- Tibouchina heteromalla, synonym of Pleroma heteromallum - silver-leaved princess flower
- Tibouchina lepidota (Bonpl.) Baill., synonym of Andesanthus lepidotus
- Tibouchina mollis (Bonpl.) Bonpl., synonym of Chaetogastra mollis
- Tibouchina mutabilis (Vell.) Cogn., synonym of Pleroma mutabile
- Tibouchina oroensis Gleason, synonym of Chaetogastra oroensis
- Tibouchina pereirae Brade & Markgr., synonym of Pleroma pereirae
- Tibouchina pulchra (Cham.) Cogn., synonym of Pleroma raddianum
- Tibouchina rufipilis (Schltdl.) Cogn., synonym of Chaetogastra rufipilis
- Tibouchina semidecandra, synonym of Pleroma semidecandrum
- Tibouchina trichopoda (DC.) Baill., synonym of Pleroma trichopodum
- Tibouchina urvilleana, synonym of Pleroma urvilleanum - princess flower, glory bush
- Tibouchina versicolor (Lindl.) Cogn., synonym of Chaetogastra versicolor

== Distribution and invasive potential ==
All the species of Tibouchina are native to the Americas as far north as Mexico south to northern Argentina, with many found in Brazil, and others in Belize, Bolivia, Brazil, Colombia, Costa Rica, French Guiana, Guyana, Honduras, Nicaragua, Panama, Peru, Suriname, and Venezuela. Members of Tibouchina tend to be found in lowland savannas and on the lower slopes of the Andes. All Tibouchina species as well as those formerly placed in the genus are considered noxious weeds in Hawaii, because of their high potential for being invasive species. Many species, such as T. araguaiensis, T. papyrus, T. mathaei and T. nigricans, have narrow distributions, being known from only a handful of locations, while a few other species, including T. aspera, T. barbigera and T. bipenicillata, have broader distributions.
