= Tibouchina nigricans =

Scientific classification
- Kingdom: Plantae
- Clade: Tracheophytes
- Clade: Angiosperms
- Clade: Eudicots
- Clade: Rosids
- Order: Myrtales
- Family: Melastomataceae
- Genus: Tibouchina
- Species: T. nigricans

Binomial name
- Tibouchina nigricans Cogn. ex P.J.F.Guim., A.L.F.Oliveira & R.Romero

Synonyms

Species of flowering plant

Tibouchina nigricans is a species of flowering plant in the family Melastomataceae, native to west-central Brazil. It was first described in 2015 with the name attributed to the earlier botanist Alfred Cogniaux. The type specimens are kept at the Missouri Botanical Gardens and at Botanischer Garten und Botanisches Museum Berlin-Dahlem, Berlin.

== Description ==
Tibouchina nigricans is a short, unbranched shrub with a dark purple hypanthium and calyx lobes. T. nigricans is similar to T. aegopogon and T. johnwurdackiana as these species each have only a single stem, although there are distinguishing differences in the trichomes and indumentum of the leaves and hypanthium.

== Distribution and habitat ==
This species is found in the states of Goiás and Distrito Federal in Brazil. It prefers open grassland including the campo sujo and cerrado rupestre. It has been found at elevations between 1,100 and 1,200 metres (3,600 and 3,900 ft). T. nigricans is only known from four collections. It has recently been found in Parque Nacional de Brasília and Serra dos Pireneus.
