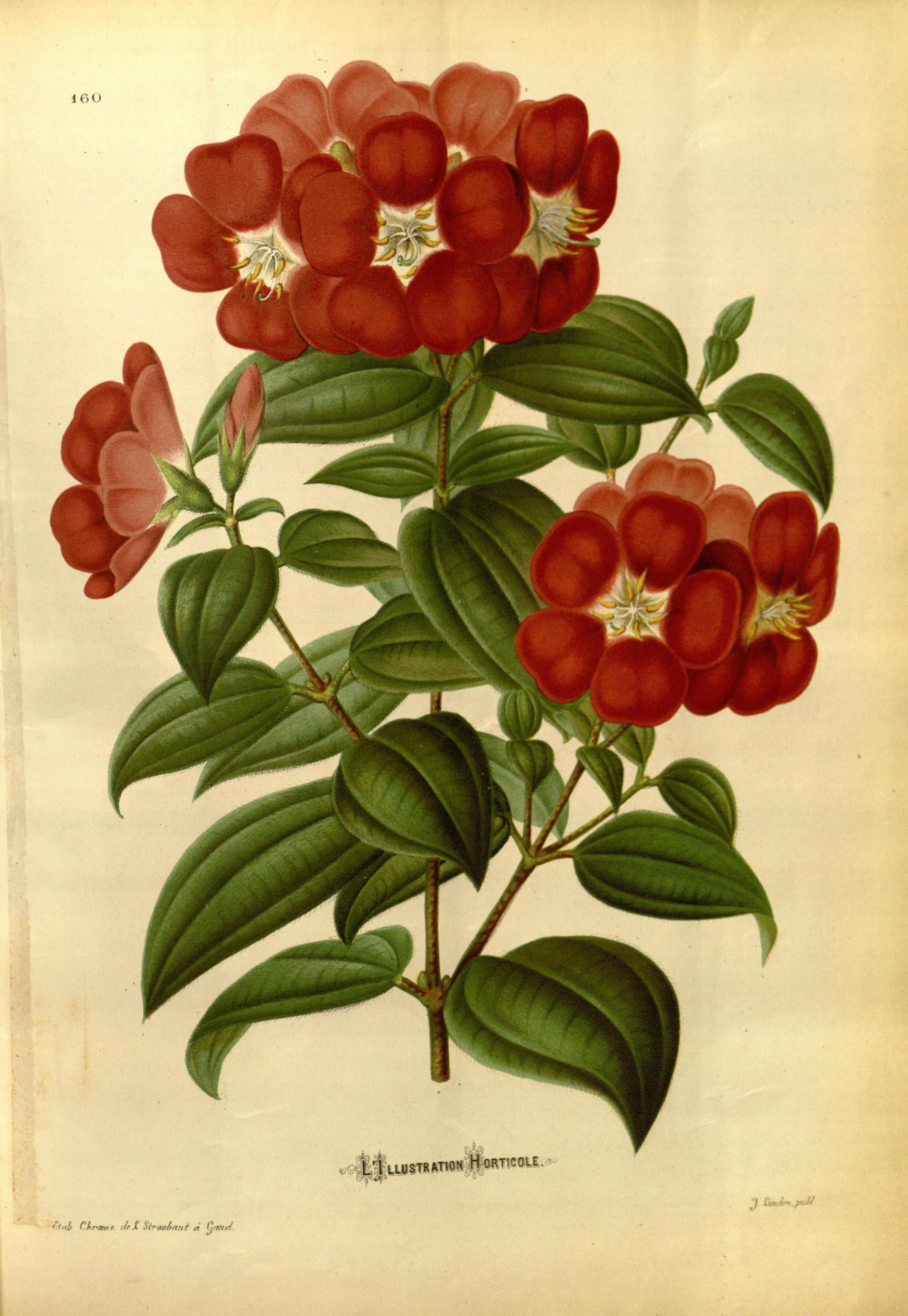
- Botanical illustration from 1874

Scientific classification
- Kingdom: Plantae
- Clade: Tracheophytes
- Clade: Angiosperms
- Clade: Eudicots
- Clade: Rosids
- Order: Myrtales
- Family: Melastomataceae
- Genus: Tibouchina
- Species: T. mathaei

Binomial name
- Tibouchina mathaei Cogn.

Synonyms
- Lasiandra lepidota Naudin

= Tibouchina mathaei =

Species of flowering plant

Tibouchina mathaei is a species of flowering plant in the family Melastomataceae, native to Peru. It was first described by Alfred Cogniaux in 1885. The type specimen is kept at the Muséum National d'Histoire Naturelle in Paris.
