= Axinaea pauciflora =

Conservation status
- Vulnerable (IUCN 3.1)

Scientific classification
- Kingdom: Plantae
- Clade: Tracheophytes
- Clade: Angiosperms
- Clade: Eudicots
- Clade: Rosids
- Order: Myrtales
- Family: Melastomataceae
- Genus: Axinaea
- Species: A. pauciflora

Binomial name
- Axinaea pauciflora Cogn.

Species of flowering plant

Axinaea pauciflora is a species of plant in the family Melastomataceae. It is endemic to Ecuador. Its natural habitat is subtropical or tropical moist montane forests. The specific epithet pauciflora is Latin for 'few-flowered'.
