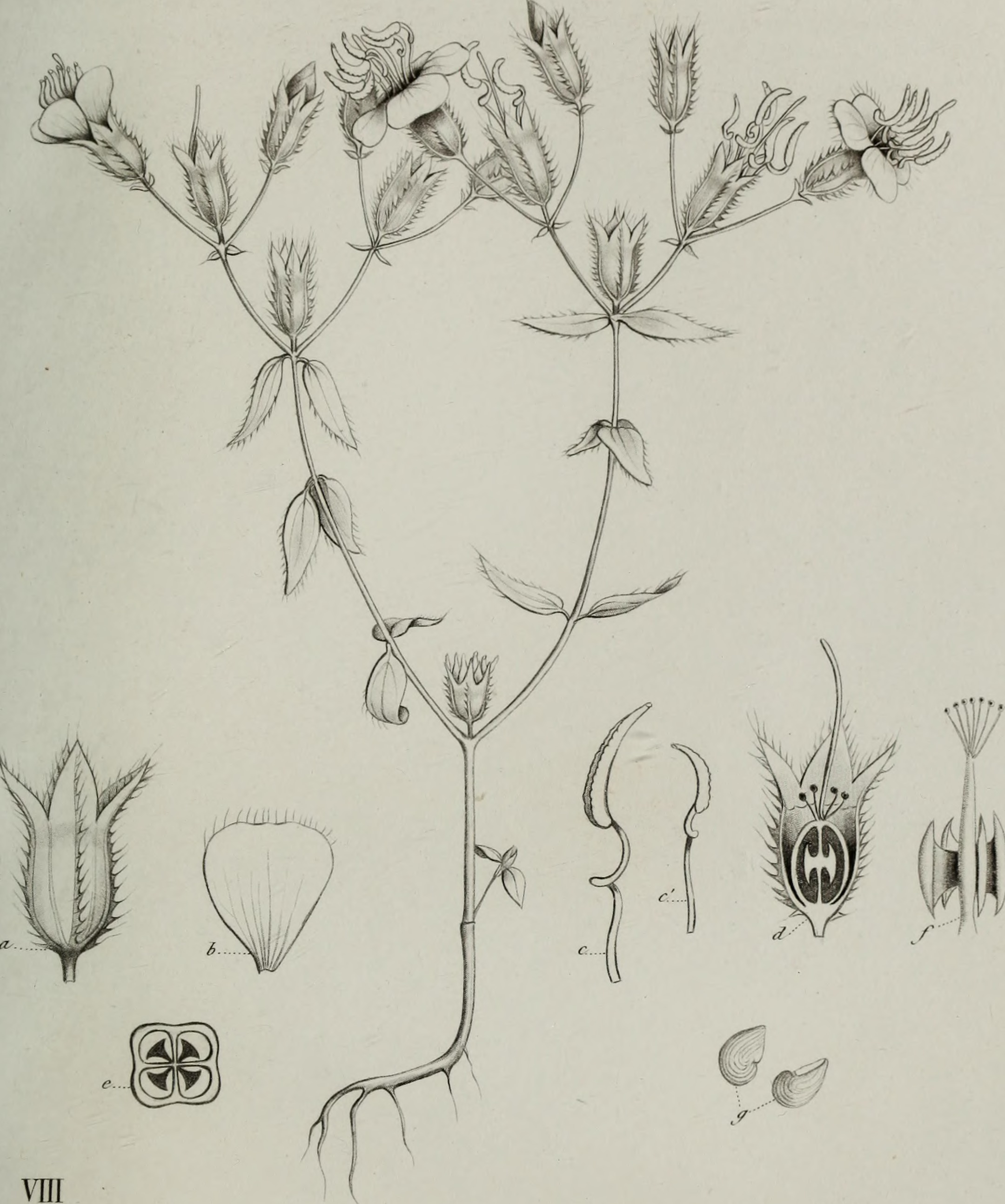
- Original botanical illustration

Scientific classification
- Kingdom: Plantae
- Clade: Embryophytes
- Clade: Tracheophytes
- Clade: Spermatophytes
- Clade: Angiosperms
- Clade: Eudicots
- Clade: Rosids
- Order: Myrtales
- Family: Melastomataceae
- Genus: Tibouchina
- Species: T. barbigera

Binomial name
- Tibouchina barbigera (Naudin) Baill.

Synonyms
- Lasiandra barbigera Naudin; Pleroma barbigerum (Naudin) Triana

= Tibouchina barbigera =

Species of flowering plant

Tibouchina barbigera is a species of flowering plant in the family Melastomataceae, native from east Bolivia to Brazil. It is a small shrub. It was first described by Naudin in 1850 as Lasiandra barbigera and transferred to Tibouchina by Henri Ernest Baillon in 1877. The type specimen is kept in the herbarium at the Muséum National d'Histoire Naturelle in Paris. A small shrub, T. barbigera is the host to a number of gall-inducing moths.
