= Tibouchina karstenii =

Scientific classification
- Kingdom: Plantae
- Clade: Embryophytes
- Clade: Tracheophytes
- Clade: Spermatophytes
- Clade: Angiosperms
- Clade: Eudicots
- Clade: Rosids
- Order: Myrtales
- Family: Melastomataceae
- Genus: Tibouchina
- Species: T. karstenii

Binomial name
- Tibouchina karstenii Cogn.

Synonyms

Species of flowering plant

Tibouchina karstenii is a species of flowering plant in the family Melastomataceae, native to Colombia. It was first described by Alfred Cogniaux in 1885. The type specimen is kept at the Naturhistorisches Museum Wien in Austria.
