= Acianthera appendiculata =

Scientific classification
- Kingdom: Plantae
- Clade: Tracheophytes
- Clade: Angiosperms
- Clade: Monocots
- Order: Asparagales
- Family: Orchidaceae
- Subfamily: Epidendroideae
- Genus: Acianthera
- Species: A. appendiculata

Binomial name
- Acianthera appendiculata (Cogn.) A.Doucette

Synonyms
- Acianthera alphonsii Kutz; Antilla appendiculata (Cogn.) Luer; Pleurothallis appendiculata Cogn.

Species of orchid

Acianthera appendiculata is a species of orchid plant native to Hispaniola (the Dominican Republic and Haiti) and Puerto Rico.
