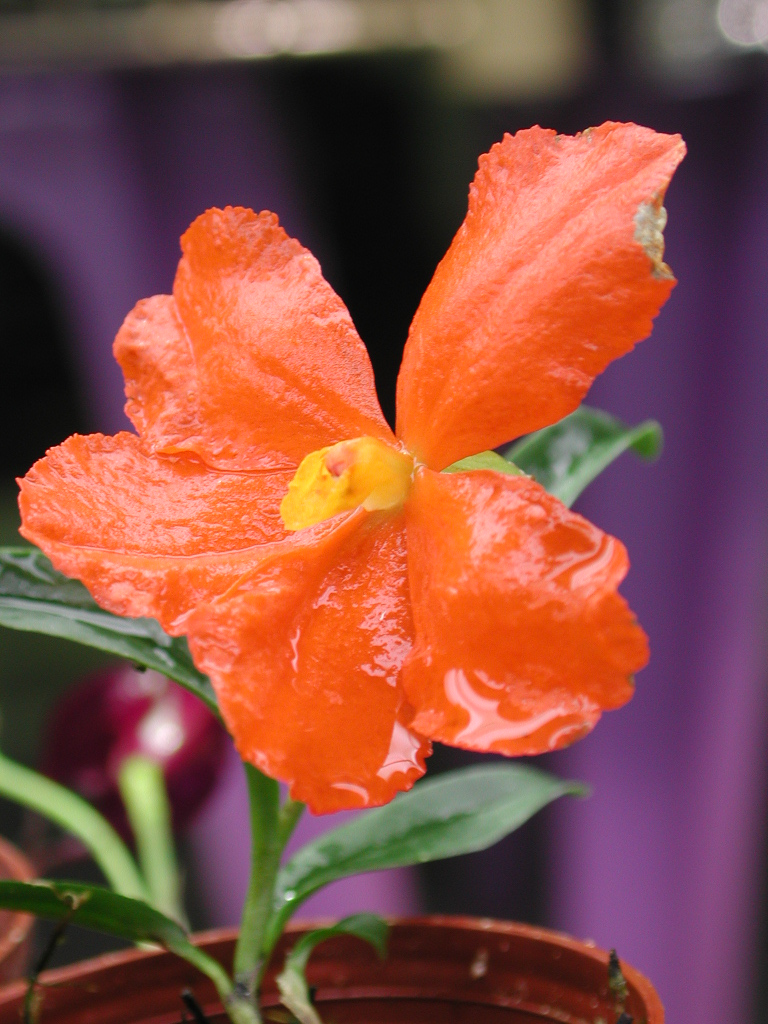

Scientific classification
- Kingdom: Plantae
- Clade: Tracheophytes
- Clade: Angiosperms
- Clade: Monocots
- Order: Asparagales
- Family: Orchidaceae
- Subfamily: Epidendroideae
- Genus: Neocogniauxia
- Species: N. hexaptera

Binomial name
- Neocogniauxia hexaptera (Cogn.) Schltr.

Synonyms
- Epidendrum hexapterum Cogn.

= Neocogniauxia hexaptera =

Species of orchid

Neocogniauxia hexaptera is a species of orchid in the subfamily Epidendroideae. It is endemic to Hispaniola. The flowers are bright orange and about 2 inches wide. It grows in shady conditions from 3,300 to 4,300 ft in elevation.
