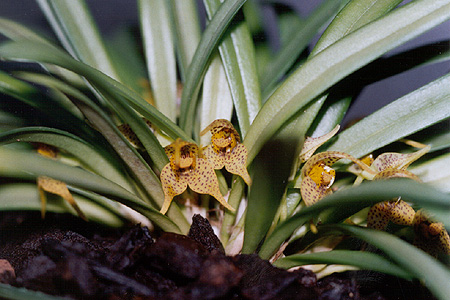

Scientific classification
- Kingdom: Plantae
- Clade: Embryophytes
- Clade: Tracheophytes
- Clade: Angiosperms
- Clade: Monocots
- Order: Asparagales
- Family: Orchidaceae
- Subfamily: Epidendroideae
- Genus: Dryadella
- Species: D. edwallii

Binomial name
- Dryadella edwallii (Cogn.) Luer

Synonyms
- Masdevallia edwallii Cogn. (Basionym)

= Dryadella edwallii =

Species of orchid

Dryadella edwallii is a species of orchid. The name is a synyonym of Dryadella zebrina (Porsch) Luer.
