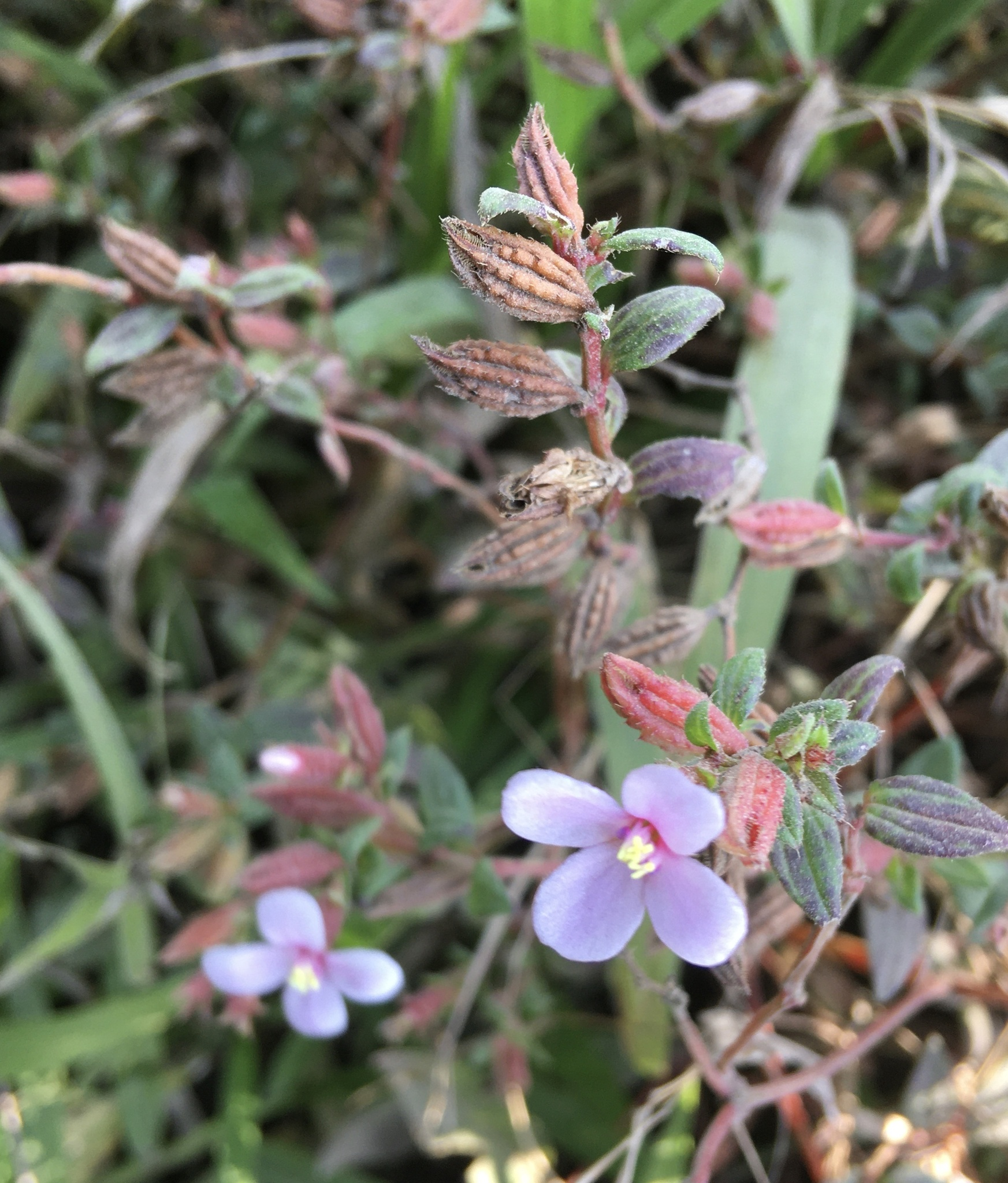
- Schwackaea cupheoides

Scientific classification
- Kingdom: Plantae
- Clade: Tracheophytes
- Clade: Angiosperms
- Clade: Eudicots
- Clade: Rosids
- Order: Myrtales
- Family: Melastomataceae
- Genus: Schwackaea; Cogn.
- Species: S. cupheoides

Binomial name
- Schwackaea cupheoides (Benth.) Cogn.

= Schwackaea =

Genus of plants

Schwackaea is a monotypic genus of flowering plants belonging to the family Melastomataceae. The only species is Schwackaea cupheoides.

Its native range is Southern Mexico to Colombia.
