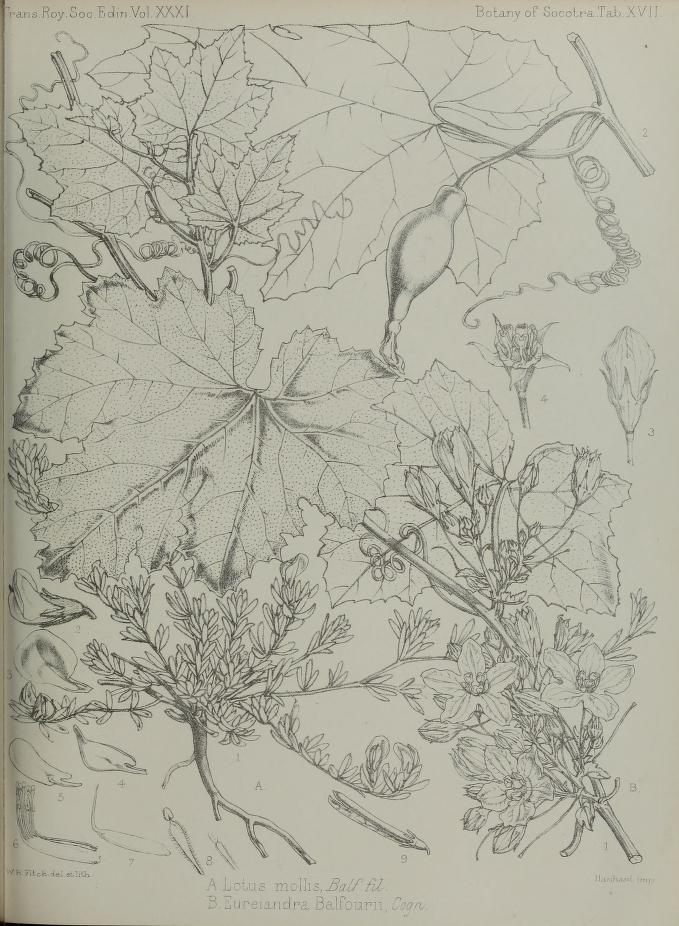
- Eureiandra balfourii above

Conservation status
- Vulnerable (IUCN 3.1)

Scientific classification
- Kingdom: Plantae
- Clade: Tracheophytes
- Clade: Angiosperms
- Clade: Eudicots
- Clade: Rosids
- Order: Cucurbitales
- Family: Cucurbitaceae
- Genus: Eureiandra
- Species: E. balfourii

Binomial name
- Eureiandra balfourii Cogn. & Balf.f.

= Eureiandra balfourii =

Species of plant

Eureiandra balfourii is a species of plant in the family Cucurbitaceae. It is endemic to Socotra in Yemen. Its natural habitat is subtropical or tropical dry forests.
