= Tibouchina araguaiensis =

Scientific classification
- Kingdom: Plantae
- Clade: Tracheophytes
- Clade: Angiosperms
- Clade: Eudicots
- Clade: Rosids
- Order: Myrtales
- Family: Melastomataceae
- Genus: Tibouchina
- Species: T. araguaiensis

Binomial name
- Tibouchina araguaiensis P.J.F.Guim.

Synonyms

Species of flowering plant

Tibouchina araguaiensis is a species of flowering plant in the family Melastomataceae, native to north Brazil. It was first described by Paulo J.F. Guimarães in 2014.

== Description ==
Tibouchina araguaiensis is a shrub that is very similar to Tibouchina papyrus. Distinguishing characters include the triangular hypanthial scales which cover the entire hypanthium, and the abaxial leaf surface which is only sparsely covered by ciliate scales; in T. papyrus, the prominent scales cover the entire lower leaf surface. These species also differ in their distribution; Tibouchina araguaiensis is found on the flat topography of Araguaia National Park, while T. papyrus is endemic to the higher elevation campos rupestres in southeast Tocantins and western Goiás.

== Distribution and habitat ==
Tibouchina araguaiensis has been found only in Araguaia National Park in the state of Tocantins, Brazil. It grows in the transitional area between forest and meadows at 200 metres in sandy soil.
