= Axinaea nitida =

Conservation status
- Near Threatened (IUCN 2.3)

Scientific classification
- Kingdom: Plantae
- Clade: Tracheophytes
- Clade: Angiosperms
- Clade: Eudicots
- Clade: Rosids
- Order: Myrtales
- Family: Melastomataceae
- Genus: Axinaea
- Species: A. nitida

Binomial name
- Axinaea nitida Cogn.

Species of plant

Axinaea nitida is a species of plant in the family Melastomataceae. It is endemic to Peru.
