= Eureiandra =

Scientific classification
- Kingdom: Plantae
- Clade: Tracheophytes
- Clade: Angiosperms
- Clade: Eudicots
- Clade: Rosids
- Order: Cucurbitales
- Family: Cucurbitaceae
- Subfamily: Cucurbitoideae
- Tribe: Coniandreae
- Genus: Eureiandra; Hook.f.

Selected species
- Eureiandra balfourii, Cogn.

Synonyms
- Euryandra Hook.f., orth. var.

Genus of flowering plants

Eureiandra is a genus of plant in the family Cucurbitaceae.
