= Tibouchina duidae =

Scientific classification
- Kingdom: Plantae
- Clade: Tracheophytes
- Clade: Angiosperms
- Clade: Eudicots
- Clade: Rosids
- Order: Myrtales
- Family: Melastomataceae
- Genus: Tibouchina
- Species: T. duidae

Binomial name
- Tibouchina duidae Gleason

Species of flowering plant

Tibouchina duidae is a species of flowering plant in the family Melastomataceae, native to Venezuela. It was first described by Henry A. Gleason in 1952.
