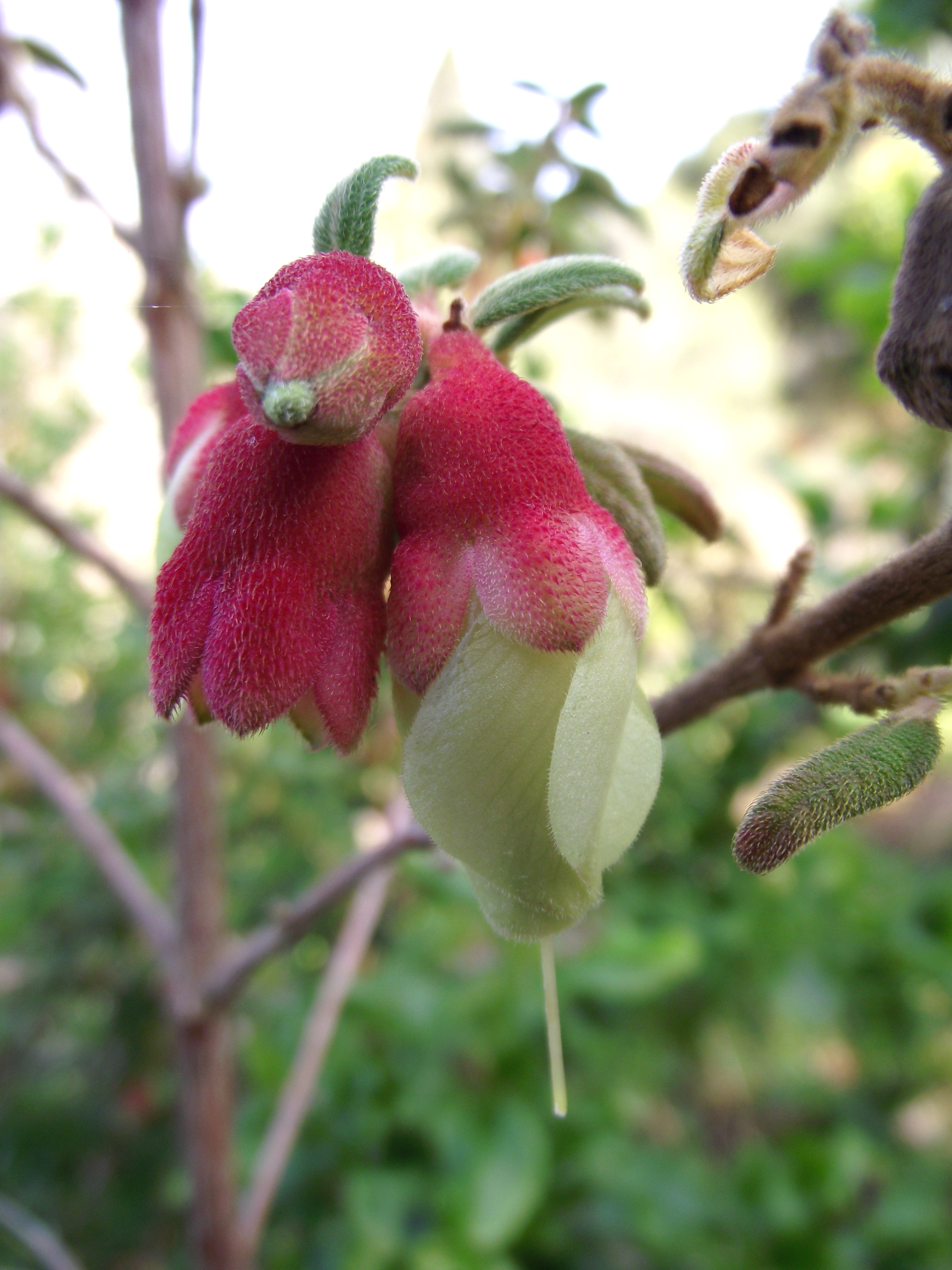
- Brachyotum ledifolium

Scientific classification
- Kingdom: Plantae
- Clade: Tracheophytes
- Clade: Angiosperms
- Clade: Eudicots
- Clade: Rosids
- Order: Myrtales
- Family: Melastomataceae
- Genus: Brachyotum (DC.) Triana

= Brachyotum =

Genus of flowering plants

Brachyotum is a genus of flowering plants in the family Melastomataceae. There are about 58 species native to the Andes of South America.

Species include:

- Brachyotum alpinum Cogn.
- Brachyotum azuayense Wurdack
- Brachyotum benthamianum Triana
- Brachyotum campanulare (Bonpl.) Triana
- Brachyotum campii Wurdack
- Brachyotum confertum (Bonpl.) Triana
- Brachyotum ecuadorense Wurdack
- Brachyotum fictum Wurdack
- Brachyotum fraternum Wurdack
- Brachyotum gleasonii Wurdack
- Brachyotum gracilescens Triana
- Brachyotum harlingii Wurdack
- Brachyotum incrassatum E.Cotton
- Brachyotum jamesonii Triana
- Brachyotum johannes-julii E.Cotton
- Brachyotum ledifolium Triana
- Brachyotum rotundifolium Cogn.
- Brachyotum rugosum Wurdack
- Brachyotum russatum E.Cotton
- Brachyotum sertulatum Ulloa
- Brachyotum strigosum (L.f.) Triana
- Brachyotum trichocalyx Triana
