= Tibouchina bipenicillata =

Scientific classification
- Kingdom: Plantae
- Clade: Tracheophytes
- Clade: Angiosperms
- Clade: Eudicots
- Clade: Rosids
- Order: Myrtales
- Family: Melastomataceae
- Genus: Tibouchina
- Species: T. bipenicillata

Binomial name
- Tibouchina bipenicillata (Naudin) Cogn.

Synonyms
- Lasiandra bipenicillata Naudin; Pleroma bipenicillatum (Naudin) Triana

Species of flowering plant

Tibouchina bipenicillata is a species of flowering plant in the family Melastomataceae, native to Colombia, Costa Rica, Panama and Venezuela. The type specimen is kept in the herbarium at Conservatoire et Jardin botaniques de la Ville de Genève in Switzerland.
