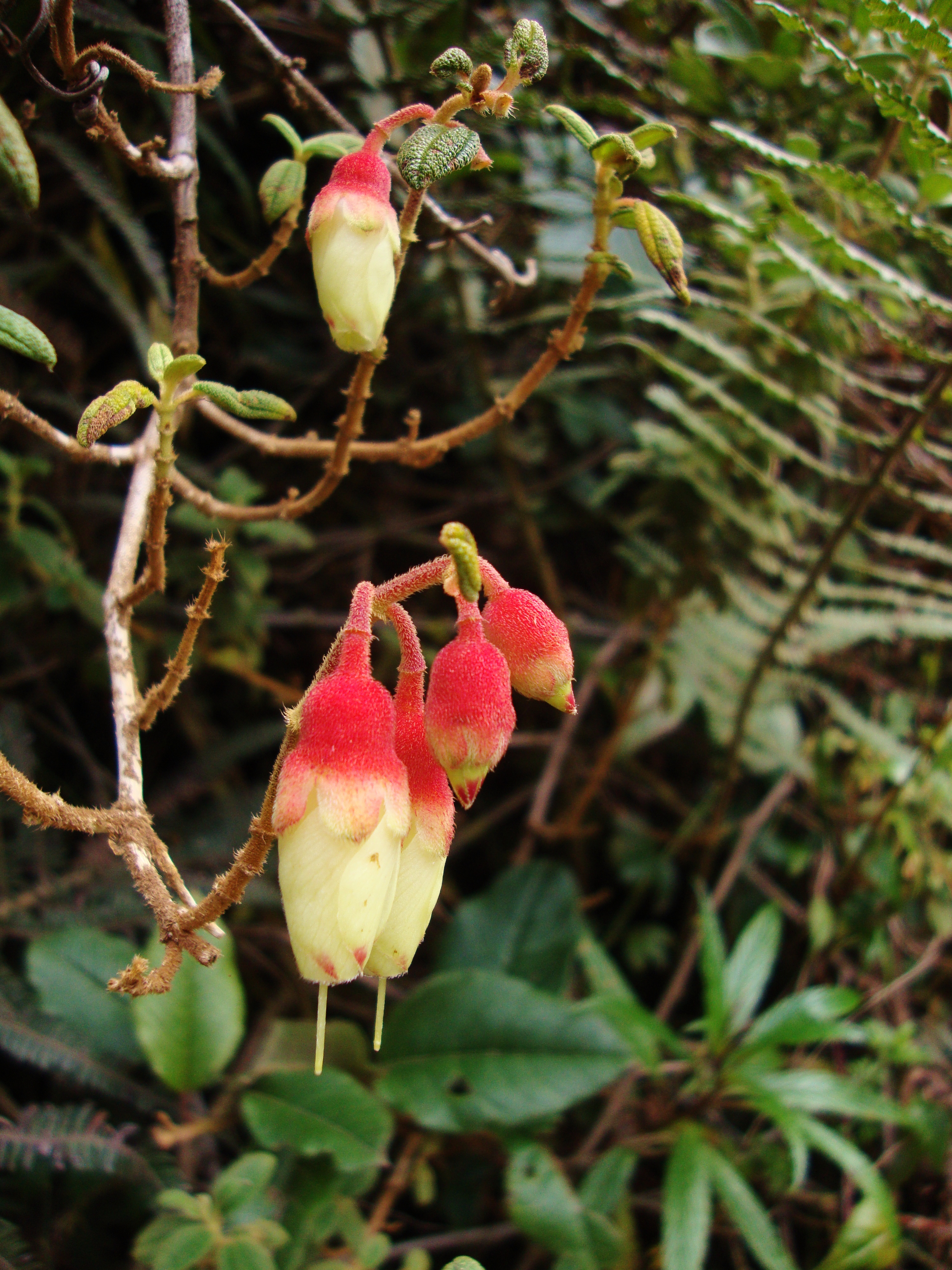
- Pucachaglla near Papallacta, Ecuador

Scientific classification
- Kingdom: Plantae
- Clade: Tracheophytes
- Clade: Angiosperms
- Clade: Eudicots
- Clade: Rosids
- Order: Myrtales
- Family: Melastomataceae
- Genus: Brachyotum
- Species: B. ledifolium

Binomial name
- Brachyotum ledifolium Triana

= Brachyotum ledifolium =

Species of flowering plant

Brachyotum ledifolium, also known as pucachaglla, is a plant of the genus Brachyotum that grows in the lower elevations of the Andean Páramo. Its fruits are edible.

The plant originates from the northern Andes, especially in Colombia and Ecuador, where it grows in the mountainous páramo vegetation as well as montane shrubs. Apart from being valued for its edible fruits, B. ledifolium has also been observed for its ability to cope with harsh mountain conditions and for its applications in ecological restoration programs.
