= Tibouchina llanorum =

Scientific classification
- Kingdom: Plantae
- Clade: Tracheophytes
- Clade: Angiosperms
- Clade: Eudicots
- Clade: Rosids
- Order: Myrtales
- Family: Melastomataceae
- Genus: Tibouchina
- Species: T. llanorum

Binomial name
- Tibouchina llanorum Wurdack

Species of flowering plant

Tibouchina llanorum is a species of flowering plant in the family Melastomataceae, native to Bolivia, north Brazil, Colombia and Venezuela. It was first described by John Julius Wurdack in 1964.
