= Axinaea sclerophylla =

Conservation status
- Vulnerable (IUCN 3.1)

Scientific classification
- Kingdom: Plantae
- Clade: Embryophytes
- Clade: Tracheophytes
- Clade: Spermatophytes
- Clade: Angiosperms
- Clade: Eudicots
- Clade: Rosids
- Order: Myrtales
- Family: Melastomataceae
- Genus: Axinaea
- Species: A. sclerophylla

Binomial name
- Axinaea sclerophylla Triana

Species of flowering plant

Axinaea sclerophylla is a species of tree in the family Melastomataceae. It is endemic to Ecuador, where its natural habitat is subtropical or tropical moist montane forests.

== Description ==
Axinaea sclerophylla is a small tree up to about 15 m (50 ft) high. The inflorescences are few in number with a small number of flowers in each inflorescence, the individual flowers being 1.5 to 3 cm (0.6 to 1.2 in) long. The flowers are purple, pink or nearly white and have fleshy, oblong petals and parts in fives.

== Distribution and habitat ==
The species is endemic to Ecuador where it is found in the southern Andes at altitudes of between 2,000 and 3,000 m (6,600 and 9,800 ft). It is known from just twelve populations in the montane forest zone, one from Sevilla de Oro in Azuay Province, one from near the Sígsig to Gualaquiza road in Morona-Santiago Province, and the rest from Loja and Zamora-Chinchipe Provinces.

== Ecology ==
The flowers of A. sclerophylla are pollinated by birds. The stamens have inflated appendages attached to them on which birds feed. The bird is attracted to the stamens by the high sugar content and plucks and eats the whole anther. When a bird grasps one of the appendages with its beak, air is forced out through a small hole, carrying a puff of pollen which lands on the bird's face and neck. When it visits another flower, pollination is likely to occur. The disadvantage of this specialised pollination mechanism is that if a key bird species were to decline, the tree might be unable to find an alternative pollinator and soon become extinct. The masked flowerpiercer (Diglossa cyanea) has been observed feeding on the stamens, removing them one by one.

== Status ==
Axinaea sclerophylla is an uncommon tree with a small range in the high Andes of southern Ecuador. It is known from just twelve populations; three of these populations are within the borders of the Podocarpus National Park. Apart from habitat destruction, no particular threats have been identified, but because of its rarity, the International Union for Conservation of Nature has rated the tree as "vulnerable".
