= Tibouchina sipapoana =

Scientific classification
- Kingdom: Plantae
- Clade: Tracheophytes
- Clade: Angiosperms
- Clade: Eudicots
- Clade: Rosids
- Order: Myrtales
- Family: Melastomataceae
- Genus: Tibouchina
- Species: T. sipapoana

Binomial name
- Tibouchina sipapoana Gleason

Synonyms

Species of flowering plant

Tibouchina sipapoana is a species of flowering plant in the family Melastomataceae, native to Venezuela. It was first described by Henry A. Gleason in 1964.
