= Tibouchina bruniana =

Scientific classification
- Kingdom: Plantae
- Clade: Tracheophytes
- Clade: Angiosperms
- Clade: Eudicots
- Clade: Rosids
- Order: Myrtales
- Family: Melastomataceae
- Genus: Tibouchina
- Species: T. bruniana

Binomial name
- Tibouchina bruniana P.J.F.Guim.

Species of flowering plant

Tibouchina bruniana is a species of flowering plant in the family Melastomataceae, native to Brazil. It was first described in 2014. Distinguishing characteristics of Tibouchina bruniana are the solitary flowers (occasionally in dichasia) and the small leaves (less than 2.5 cm long). The anthers have long, simple trichomes which led to this species being placed in the section Barbigerae. This shrub is found in cerrado vegetation, growing in compacted soil and in swampy areas at around 1,100 metres. The species is only known from one population growing close to a nickel mine in the Brazilian state of Goiás.
