= Axinaea merianiae =

Conservation status
- Least Concern (IUCN 3.1)

Scientific classification
- Kingdom: Plantae
- Clade: Tracheophytes
- Clade: Angiosperms
- Clade: Eudicots
- Clade: Rosids
- Order: Myrtales
- Family: Melastomataceae
- Genus: Axinaea
- Species: A. merianiae

Binomial name
- Axinaea merianiae (DC.) Triana

Species of flowering plant

Axinaea merianiae is a species of plant in the family Melastomataceae. It is endemic to Ecuador. Its natural habitats are subtropical or tropical dry shrubland and subtropical or tropical high-elevation shrubland.
