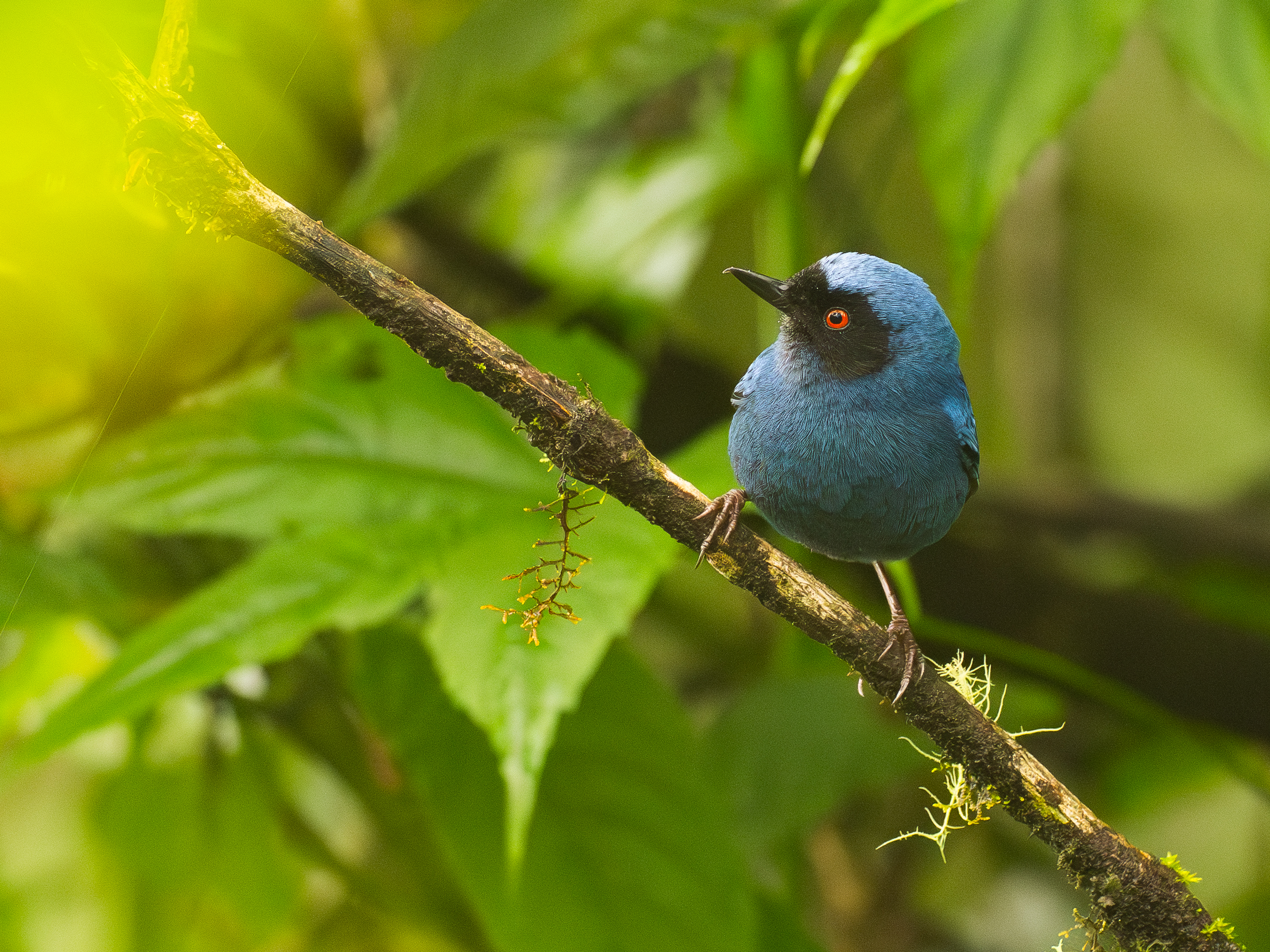
- Diglossa cyanea cyanea Tandayapa Valley, Ecuador
- Calling in Azuay, Ecuador

Conservation status
- Least Concern (IUCN 3.1)

Scientific classification
- Kingdom: Animalia
- Phylum: Chordata
- Class: Aves
- Order: Passeriformes
- Family: Thraupidae
- Genus: Diglossa
- Species: D. cyanea

Binomial name
- Diglossa cyanea (Lafresnaye, 1840)

Synonyms
- Diglossopis cyanea Lafresnaye, 1840

= Warbling masked flowerpiercer =

Species of bird

The warbling masked flowerpiercer or masked flowerpiercer (Diglossa cyanea) is a species of bird in the tanager family, Thraupidae. It is found in humid montane forest and scrub in Venezuela, Colombia, Ecuador and northern Peru. Flowerpiercers got their name from the fact that they have a sharp hook on the tip of their upper mandible which they use to slice open the base of flowers to get at the nectar. This species was formerly considered to be conspecific with the whistling masked flowerpiercer (Diglossa melanopis).

== Taxonomy ==
The warbling masked flowerpiercer was formally described in 1840 by the French ornithologist Frédéric de Lafresnaye based on a specimen collected by Auguste Boissonneau near Santa Fe, Bogotá in Colombia. Lafresnaye coined the binomial name Uncirostrum cyaneum. The masked flowerpiercer is now one of 18 flowerpiercers placed in the genus Diglossa that was introduced in 1832 by the German naturalist Johann Georg Wagler.

Four subspecies are recognised:

- D. c. obscura Phelps, WH & Phelps, WH Jr, 1952 – northwest Venezuela
- D. c. tovarensis Zimmer, JT & Phelps, WH, 1952 – north Venezuela
- D. c. cyanea (Lafresnaye, 1840) – west Venezuela, Colombia and Ecuador (except southwest)
- D. c. dispar Zimmer, JT, 1942 – southwest Ecuador and northwest Peru

The whistling masked flowerpiercer (Diglossa melanopis) was formerly considered as a subspecies. It is now considered as a separate species based on the mitochondrial DNA divergence, vocalization and morphology.

== Description ==
The warbling masked flowerpiercer grows to a length of about 15 cm (6 in). The adult male is deep ultramarine blue with a dark mask. The beak is large, black, and upturned, with a characteristic hook on the tip of the upper mandible. The iris is bright red. The female is similar in appearance but altogether duller. The juvenile has a reddish-brown iris. The song is a series of reedlike notes terminating in a twitter.

== Distribution and habitat ==
The warbling masked flowerpiercer is endemic to the Andes in South America where its range extends from Venezuela and Colombia, through Ecuador to northern Peru. It inhabits montane forest, cloud forest, secondary forest, scrubby woodland and forest edges, at altitudes between about 2,000 and 3,500 m (6,600 and 11,500 ft).

== Ecology ==
This bird is often seen in small groups or mixed flocks, foraging through the foliage for insects and fruit, and probing into flowers with its beak. The flowers of the small tree Axinaea sclerophylla are pollinated by birds, the pollen being liberated in a puff when the stamens are manipulated. During a research study, the only bird seen visiting the flowers was the warbling masked flowerpiercer, which proceeded to pull off and consume the stamens, one at a time.

Breeding takes place between June and September in Colombia, but in other parts of the range, juveniles have been seen at various times of year. The nest is a cup-shaped construction, built in a bush, and composed of mosses and dry grasses and lined with feathers. The eggs are pale bluish-green blotched and speckled with reddish-brown.

== Status ==
The warbling masked flowerpiercer is described as being common within its very wide range. The International Union for Conservation of Nature has assessed its conservation status as being of "least concern" due to its stable population and lack of threats.

== Gallery ==
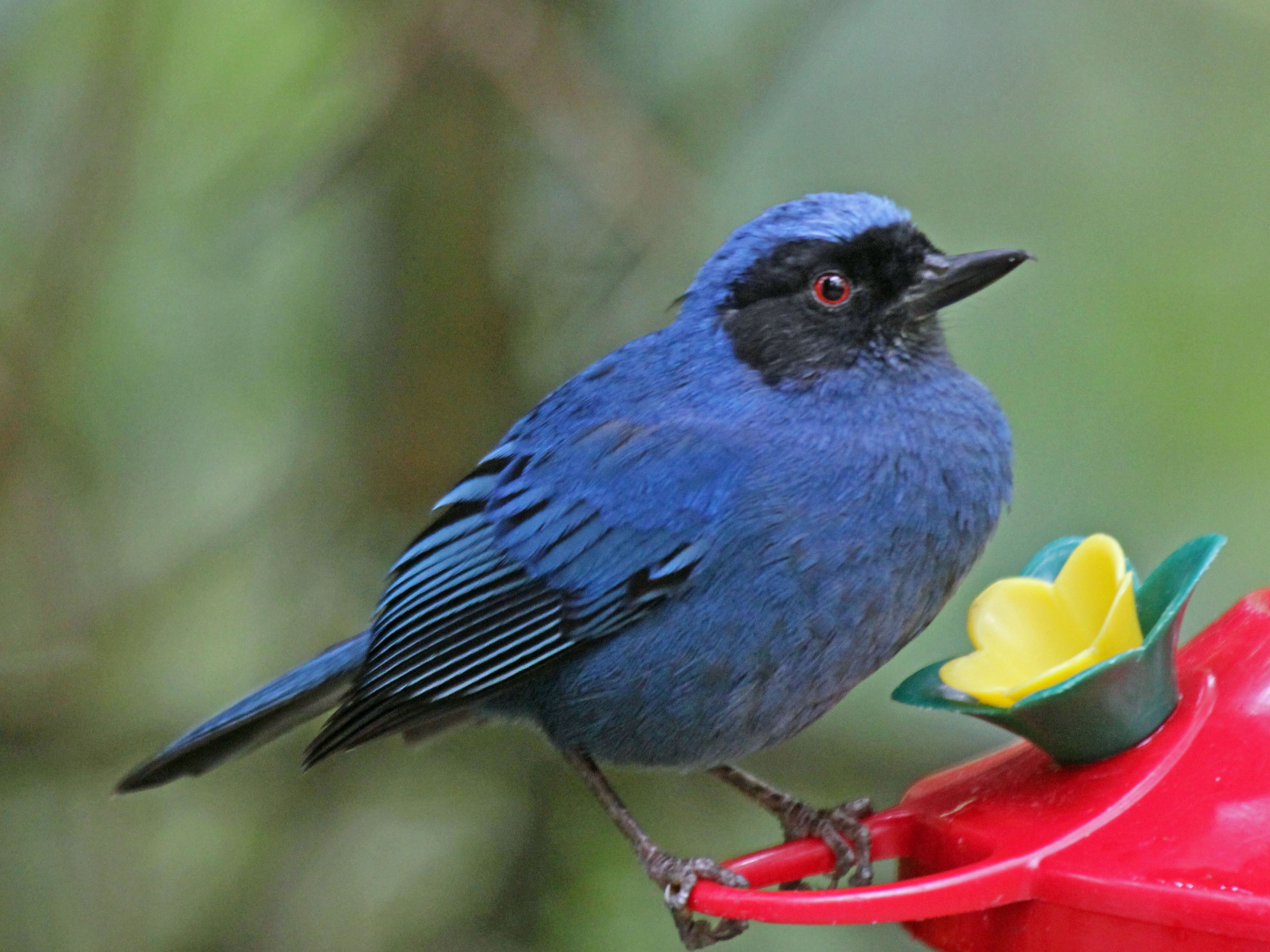

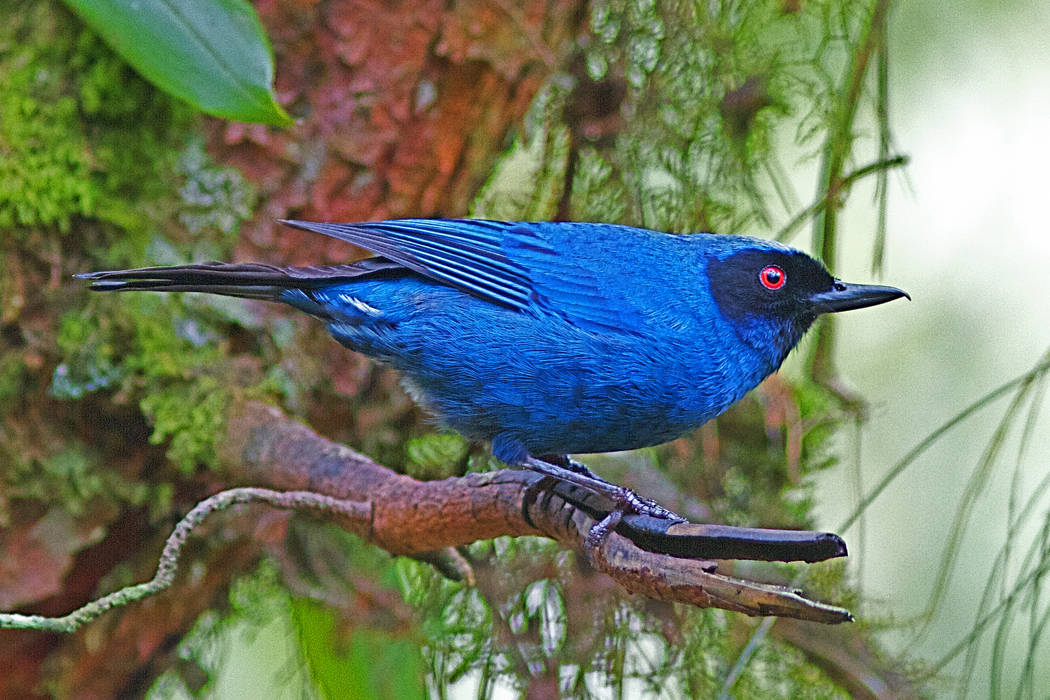
