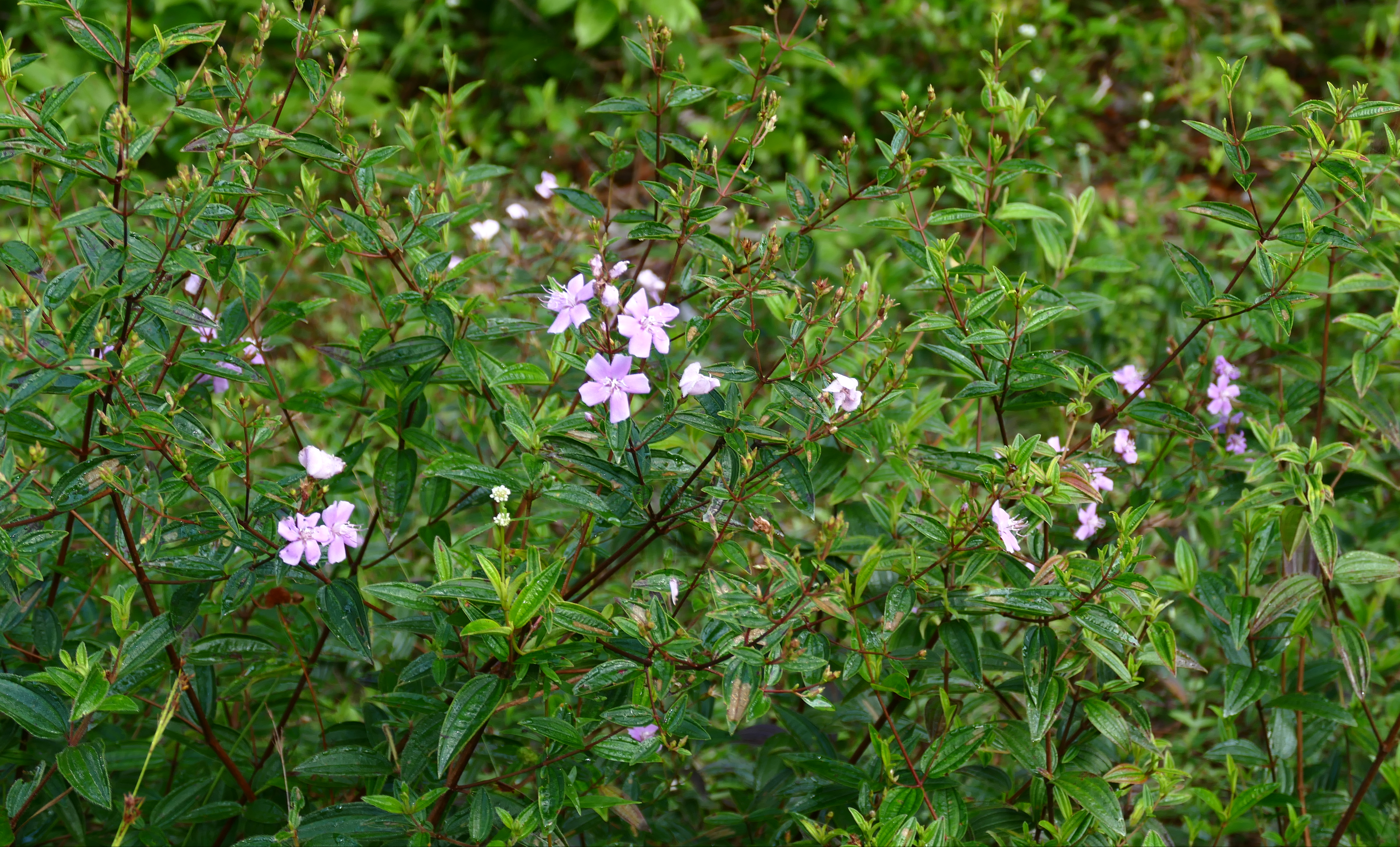

Conservation status
- Least Concern (IUCN 3.1)

Scientific classification
- Kingdom: Plantae
- Clade: Tracheophytes
- Clade: Angiosperms
- Clade: Eudicots
- Clade: Rosids
- Order: Myrtales
- Family: Melastomataceae
- Genus: Tibouchina
- Species: T. aspera

Binomial name
- Tibouchina aspera Aubl.

Synonyms
- Lasiandra tibuchina Naudin; Melastoma aromaticum Vahl; Melastoma tibouchina Desr.; Pleroma tibouchinum Triana; Rhexia aspera (Aubl.) Willd.

= Tibouchina aspera =

Species of flowering plant

Tibouchina aspera is a species of flowering plant in the family Melastomataceae, native to Central America and tropical South America. It was first described by Jean Fusée Aublet in 1775. In the original description of the species, it was suggested that the plant was inhaled to treat chest pain and dry coughs.

== Description ==
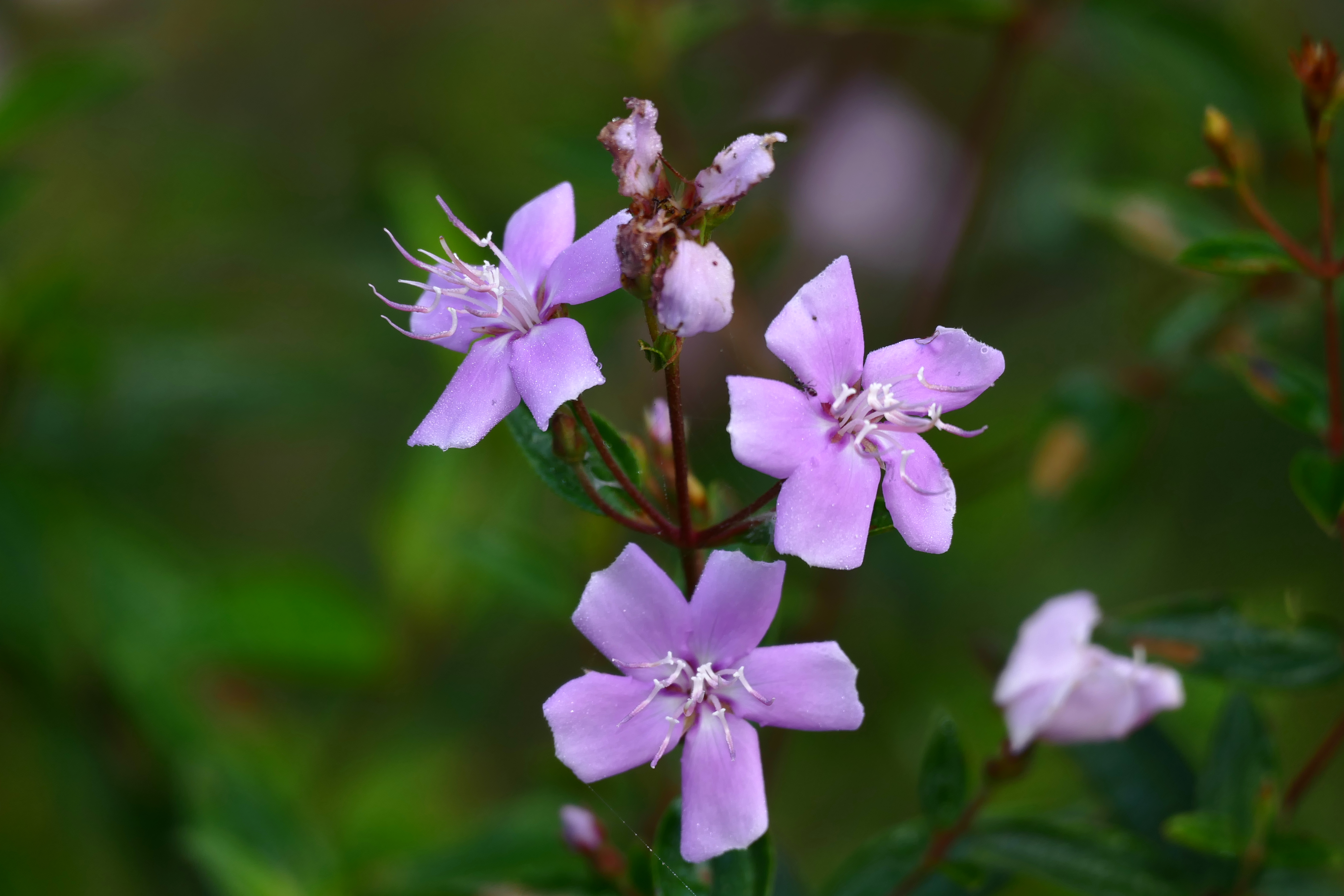
Flowers

Tibouchina aspera is a subshrub with densely scaly indumentum on the stem, petiole, calyces and hypanthium.

== Taxonomy ==
Tibouchina aspera was first described in 1775 and is the type species of the genus Tibouchina. The description was based on a specimen from French Guiana which is currently kept in the herbarium at the Natural History Museum in London.

=== Varieties ===
There are three described varieties:

- T. aspera var. aspera
- T. aspera var. asperrima Cogn.
- T. aspera var. poeppigii Cogn.

== Distribution and habitat ==
Tibouchina aspera is widely distributed in Central and South America, including in Belize, Bolivia, Colombia, French Guiana, Guyana, Honduras, Nicaragua, Panama, Peru, Suriname, Venezuela, and in the Brazilian states of Amapá, Roraima, Amazonas, Pará, Acre, Rondônia, Maranháo, and Mato Grosso. It is commonly found in the cerrado, campinas and restingas in humid, sandy soil. In a study of the Melastomataceae of the Brazilian restingas in Pará, T. aspera was found in herbaceous marsh, fields between dunes and open shrubby fields.
