= Axinaea affinis =

Scientific classification
- Kingdom: Plantae
- Clade: Tracheophytes
- Clade: Angiosperms
- Clade: Eudicots
- Clade: Rosids
- Order: Myrtales
- Family: Melastomataceae
- Genus: Axinaea
- Species: A. affinis

Binomial name
- Axinaea affinis (Naudin) Cogn.

Synonyms
- Chastenaea affinis Naudin

Species of flowering plant

Axinaea affinis is a species of tree in the family Melastomataceae. It is native to mountainous regions of the Andes in South America in Peru and Ecuador. Its natural habitat is subtropical or tropical moist montane forests.

== Description ==
Axinaea affinis is a large shrub or small tree. The inflorescences are terminal pannicles of flowers with parts in five. The calyx is blunt and the petals are oblong or obovate and white or flushed with pink, red or purple. The stamens are black with bright orange inflated appendages. The ovary is superior and the fruit is a many-seeded capsule.

== Ecology ==
Most members of the family Melastomataceae are pollinated by buzz pollination, a technique whereby certain species of bee are able to create vibrations that loosen the pollen when they visit the blooms, but the flowers of members of the genus Axinaea have unique appendages to their stamens and are pollinated by birds. These flowers do not produce nectar, but the appendages are inflated and bulbous and have a high sugar content, and birds find them attractive to eat. As the bird plucks and grasps the bulbous portion with its beak, air is forced out through a small orifice, carrying a puff of pollen which lands on the face and neck of the bird. As the bird feeds on other flowers, transfer of pollen is likely to occur. Some pollen lands in the centre of the flower which means that some self-pollination probably occurs. Another factor that raises pollination rates in some populations of the tree, is simultaneous flowering. The birds and the flowers have co-evolved and if habitat destruction were to reduce the population of pollinating birds, the tree might become extinct, unless other pollinators filled the gap.
