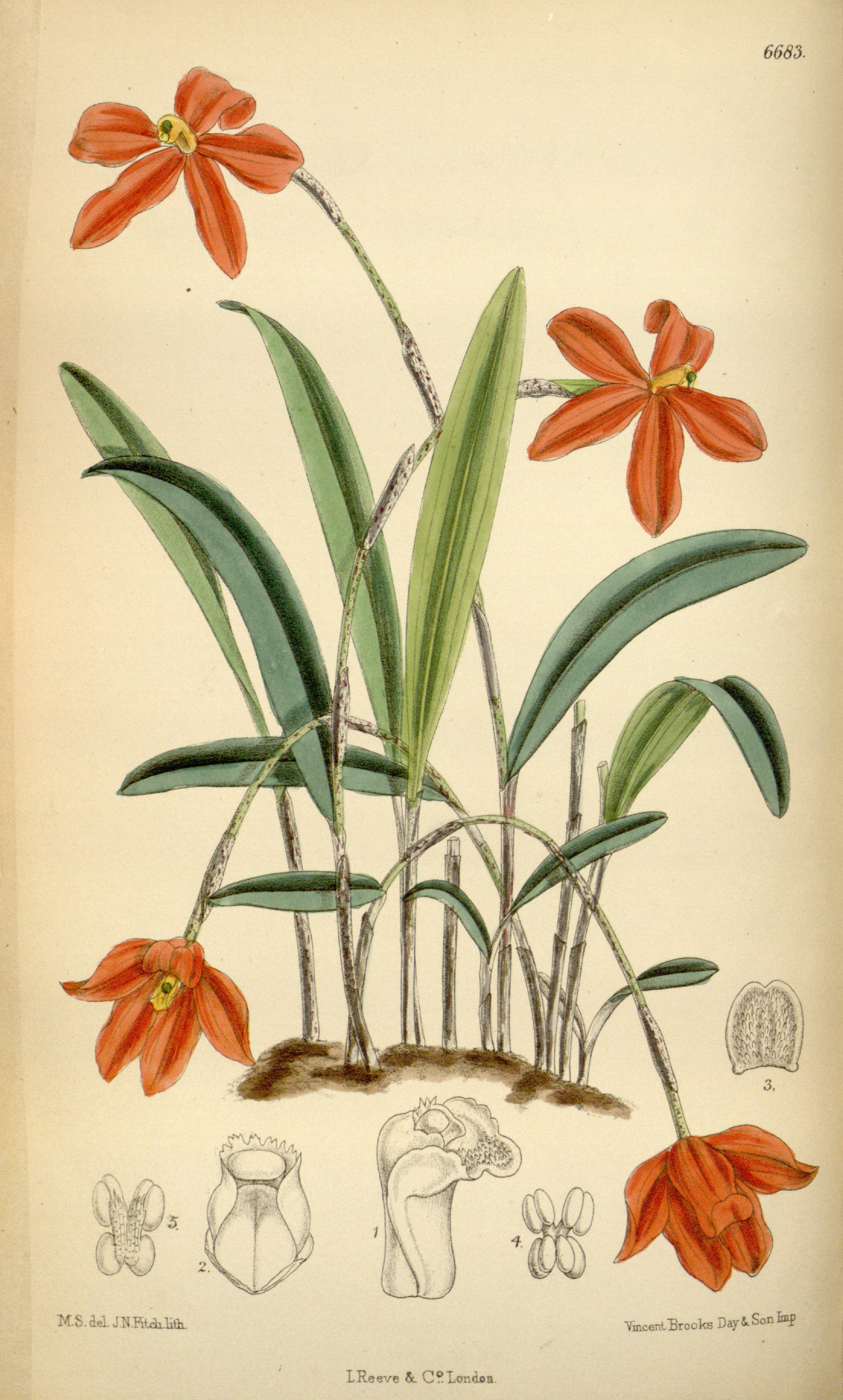

Scientific classification
- Kingdom: Plantae
- Clade: Tracheophytes
- Clade: Angiosperms
- Clade: Monocots
- Order: Asparagales
- Family: Orchidaceae
- Subfamily: Epidendroideae
- Genus: Neocogniauxia
- Species: N. monophylla

Binomial name
- Neocogniauxia monophylla (Griseb.) Schltr.

= Neocogniauxia monophylla =

Species of orchid

Neocogniauxia monophylla is a species of flowering plant in the subfamily Epidendroideae, and family Orchidaceae. It grows in Jamaica from elevations of 3,300 to 5,300 ft.
