= Tibouchina striphnocalyx =

Scientific classification
- Kingdom: Plantae
- Clade: Tracheophytes
- Clade: Angiosperms
- Clade: Eudicots
- Clade: Rosids
- Order: Myrtales
- Family: Melastomataceae
- Genus: Tibouchina
- Species: T. striphnocalyx

Binomial name
- Tibouchina striphnocalyx (DC.) Pittier

Synonyms
- Chaetogastra striphnocalyx (DC.) Mart.; Osbeckia striphnocalyx DC.; Pleroma striphnocalyx (DC.) Triana; Pterolepis striphnocalyx (DC.) Cogn.; Pterolepis striphnocalyx var. grandifolia Cogn.; Rhexia striphnocalyx Mart. ex DC.; Tibouchina yavitensis Pittier

Species of flowering plant

Tibouchina striphnocalyx is a species of flowering plant in the family Melastomataceae, native to north Brazil, Colombia and Venezuela. It was first described in 1828 by Augustin de Candolle as Osbeckia striphnocalyx.
