= Tibouchina fraterna =

Scientific classification
- Kingdom: Plantae
- Clade: Tracheophytes
- Clade: Angiosperms
- Clade: Eudicots
- Clade: Rosids
- Order: Myrtales
- Family: Melastomataceae
- Genus: Tibouchina
- Species: T. fraterna

Binomial name
- Tibouchina fraterna N.E.Br.

Species of flowering plant

Tibouchina fraterna is a species of flowering plant in the family Melastomataceae, native to Guyana and south Venezuela. It was first described by Nicholas Edward Brown in 1901. The type specimen is kept in the herbarium at the Berlin Botanical Garden and Botanical Museum. One chromosome count has been done for this species with a gametophytic count of 9.

Two subspecies are recognized:

- Tibouchina fraterna subsp. fraterna
- Tibouchina fraterna subsp. paruana Wurdack
