= Tibouchina edmundoi =

Scientific classification
- Kingdom: Plantae
- Clade: Tracheophytes
- Clade: Angiosperms
- Clade: Eudicots
- Clade: Rosids
- Order: Myrtales
- Family: Melastomataceae
- Genus: Tibouchina
- Species: T. edmundoi

Binomial name
- Tibouchina edmundoi Brade

Species of flowering plant

Tibouchina edmundoi is a species of flowering plant in the family Melastomataceae, native to north Brazil. It was first described by Alexander Curt Brade in 1959.
