= Tibouchina dissitiflora =

Scientific classification
- Kingdom: Plantae
- Clade: Tracheophytes
- Clade: Angiosperms
- Clade: Eudicots
- Clade: Rosids
- Order: Myrtales
- Family: Melastomataceae
- Genus: Tibouchina
- Species: T. dissitiflora

Binomial name
- Tibouchina dissitiflora Wurdack

Species of flowering plant

Tibouchina dissitiflora is a species of flowering plant in the family Melastomataceae, native to Venezuela. It was first described by John Julius Wurdack in 1958.
