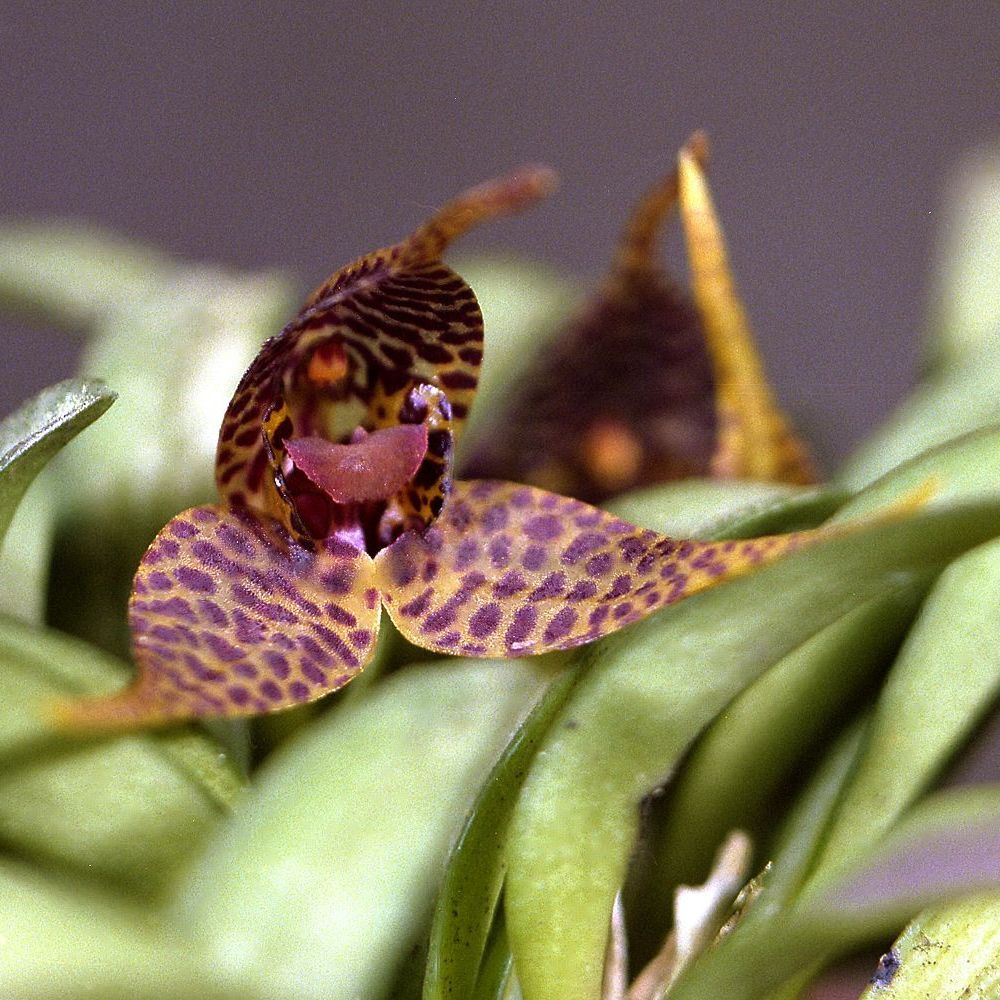

Scientific classification
- Kingdom: Plantae
- Clade: Tracheophytes
- Clade: Angiosperms
- Clade: Monocots
- Order: Asparagales
- Family: Orchidaceae
- Subfamily: Epidendroideae
- Genus: Dryadella
- Species: D. simula

Binomial name
- Dryadella simula (Rchb.f.) Luer

Synonyms
- Masdevallia simula Rchb.f. (Basionym)

= Dryadella simula =

Species of orchid

Dryadella simula is a species of orchid.
