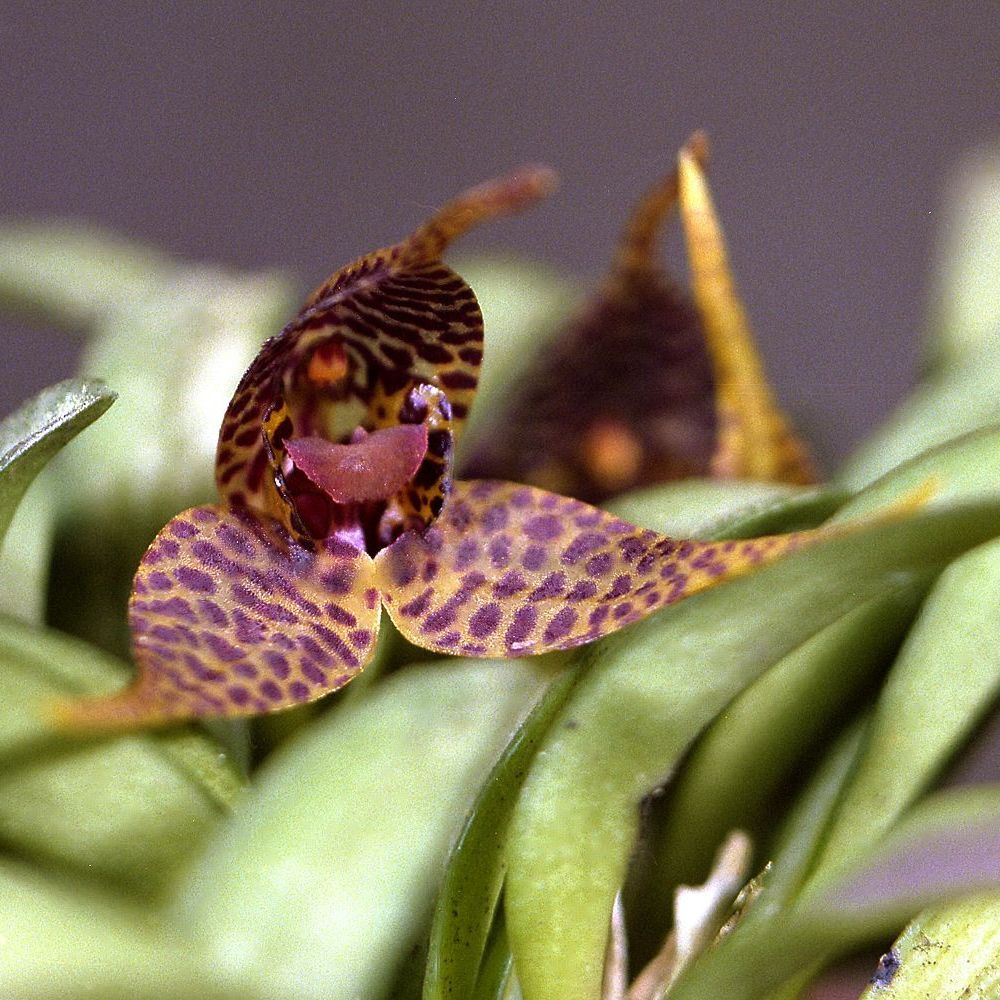
- Dryadella simula

Scientific classification
- Kingdom: Plantae
- Clade: Tracheophytes
- Clade: Angiosperms
- Clade: Monocots
- Order: Asparagales
- Family: Orchidaceae
- Subfamily: Epidendroideae
- Tribe: Epidendreae
- Subtribe: Pleurothallidinae
- Genus: Dryadella; Luer (1978)

Type species
- Dryadella elata (Luer) Luer (1978)

= Dryadella =

Genus of orchids

Dryadella is a genus of miniature orchids, formerly included in the genus Masdevallia. Plants are typically composed of a tuft of leaves from 3 to 6 cm long. The small (1–2 cm) flowers are often conspicuously spotted, and are borne at the base of the leaves. There are about 60 species, distributed from southern Mexico to southern Brazil and northern Argentina. In cultivation many of the species seem to respond well to being grown on cork or treefern rather than in pots. The attractive species Dryadella edwallii, commonly known as 'Partridge in the Grass' can be easily grown into a spectacular specimen plant, full of flowers. The genus name of Dryadella refers to Dryad, a tree nymph or tree spirit in Greek mythology.

== Range of distribution ==
They are found in Belize, Bolivia, Brazil, Colombia, Costa Rica, Ecuador, El Salvador, Guatemala, Honduras, Mexico, Nicaragua, Panamá, Paraguay, Peru and Venezuela.

== List of species ==
As accepted by Plants of the World Online (Feb. 2022);

- Dryadella albicans (Luer) Luer (1978)
- Dryadella ana-paulae V.P.Castro (2004)
- Dryadella ataleiensis Campacci
- Dryadella aurea Luer & Hirtz (1999)
- Dryadella auriculigera (Rchb.f.) Luer (1978)
- Dryadella aviceps (Rchb.f.) Luer (1978)
- Dryadella barrowii Luer (2005)
- Dryadella butcheri Luer (1999)
- Dryadella cardosoi Campacci & J.B.F.Silva
- Dryadella clavellata Luer & Hirtz (2005)
- Dryadella crassicaudata Luer (2005)
- Dryadella crenulata (Pabst) Luer (1978)
- Dryadella cristata Luer & R.Escobar (1982)
- Dryadella cuspidata Luer & Hirtz (1999)
- Dryadella dodsonii Luer (1999)
- Dryadella dressleri Luer (1999)
- Dryadella edwallii (Cogn.) Luer (1978)
- Dryadella elata (Luer) Luer (1978)
- Dryadella espirito-santensis (Pabst) Luer (1978)
- Dryadella fuchsii Luer (1999)
- Dryadella gnoma (Luer) Luer (1978)
- Dryadella gomes-ferreirae (Pabst) Luer (1978)
- Dryadella greenwoodiana Soto Arenas (2002)
- Dryadella guatemalensis (Schltr.) Luer (1978)
- Dryadella hirtzii Luer (1980)
- Dryadella kautskyi (Pabst) Luer (1978)
- Dryadella lilliputiana (Cogn.) Luer (1978)
- Dryadella linearifolia (Ames) Luer (1978)
- Dryadella litoralis Campacci (2007)
- Dryadella lueriana Carnevali & G.A.Romero (1991)
- Dryadella marilyniana Luer (2006)
- Dryadella marsupiata Luer (1982)
- Dryadella meiracyllium (Rchb.f.) Luer (1978)
- Dryadella minuscula Luer & R.Escobar (1978)
- Dryadella mocoana Luer & R.Escobar (2005)
- Dryadella nasuta Luer & Hirtz (2005)
- Dryadella nortonii Luer (2005)
- Dryadella odontostele Luer (1996)
- Dryadella osmariniana (Braga) Garay & Dunst. (1979)
- Dryadella pachyrhiza Luer & Hirtz (1999)
- Dryadella perpusilla (Kraenzl.) Luer (1978)
- Dryadella pusiola (Rchb.f.) Luer (1978)
- Dryadella rodrigoi Luer (1999)
- Dryadella sapucaiensis Campacci & S.L.X.Tobias
- Dryadella simula (Rchb.f.) Luer (1978)
- Dryadella sororcula Luer (1996)
- Dryadella speculifera Vierling
- Dryadella sublata Luer & J.Portilla (2005)
- Dryadella summersii (L.O.Williams) Luer (1978)
- Dryadella susanae (Pabst) Luer (1978)
- Dryadella toscanoi Luer (2005)
- Dryadella vasquezii Luer (2005)
- Dryadella verrucosa Luer & R.Escobar (1999)
- Dryadella vitorinoi Luer & Toscano (2002)
- Dryadella werneri Luer (2001)
- Dryadella wuerstlei Luer (2005)
- Dryadella xavieriana Campacci & C.R.M.Silva
- Dryadella yupanki (Luer & R.Vásquez) Karremans (2016)
- Dryadella zebrina (Porsch) Luer (1978)
