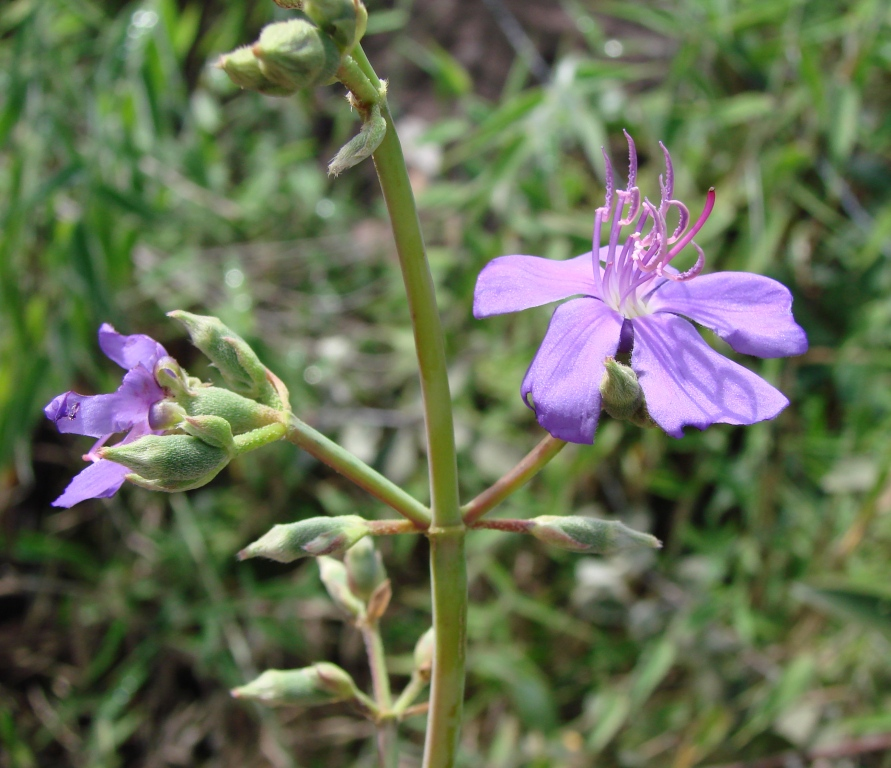

Scientific classification
- Kingdom: Plantae
- Clade: Tracheophytes
- Clade: Angiosperms
- Clade: Eudicots
- Clade: Rosids
- Order: Myrtales
- Family: Melastomataceae
- Genus: Tibouchina
- Species: T. aegopogon

Binomial name
- Tibouchina aegopogon (Naudin) Cogn.

Synonyms
- Lasiandra aegopogon Naudin; Pleroma aegopogon (Naudin) Triana

= Tibouchina aegopogon =

Species of flowering plant

Tibouchina aegopogon is a species of flowering plant in the family Melastomataceae, native to Bolivia and Brazil.
