= Tibouchina verticillaris =

Scientific classification
- Kingdom: Plantae
- Clade: Tracheophytes
- Clade: Angiosperms
- Clade: Eudicots
- Clade: Rosids
- Order: Myrtales
- Family: Melastomataceae
- Genus: Tibouchina
- Species: T. verticillaris

Binomial name
- Tibouchina verticillaris Cogn.

Species of flowering plant

Tibouchina verticillaris is a species of flowering plant in the family Melastomataceae, native to Brazil. It was first described by Alfred Cogniaux in 1885.
