= Brachyotum campii =

Conservation status
- Near Threatened (IUCN 3.1)

Scientific classification
- Kingdom: Plantae
- Clade: Tracheophytes
- Clade: Angiosperms
- Clade: Eudicots
- Clade: Rosids
- Order: Myrtales
- Family: Melastomataceae
- Genus: Brachyotum
- Species: B. campii

Binomial name
- Brachyotum campii Wurdack

Species of flowering plant

Brachyotum campii is a species of plant in the family Melastomataceae. It is endemic to Ecuador. Its natural habitats are subtropical or tropical high-altitude shrubland and subtropical or tropical high-altitude grassland.
