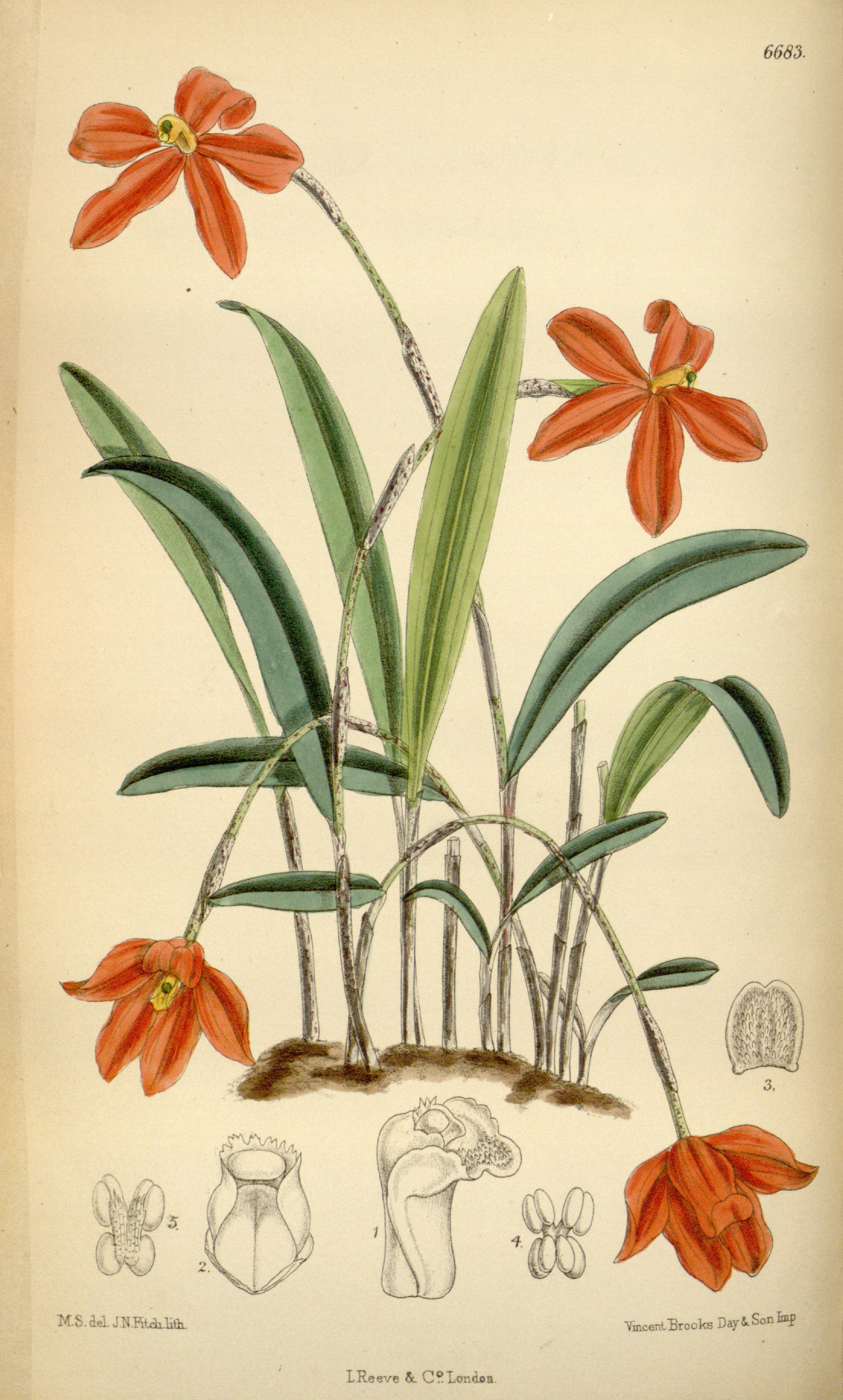
- Neocogniauxia monophylla

Scientific classification
- Kingdom: Plantae
- Clade: Tracheophytes
- Clade: Angiosperms
- Clade: Monocots
- Order: Asparagales
- Family: Orchidaceae
- Subfamily: Epidendroideae
- Tribe: Epidendreae
- Subtribe: Pleurothallidinae
- Genus: Neocogniauxia; Schltr.

Type species
- Neocogniauxia monophylla

Species
- Neocogniauxia hexaptera; Neocogniauxia monophylla

= Neocogniauxia =

Genus of orchids

Neocogniauxia is a genus of orchids, (family Orchidaceae), consisting of two species in the Greater Antilles. The genus is named for botanist Alfred Cogniaux.

== Species ==
Image	Scientific name	Distribution	Elevation
	Neocogniauxia hexaptera (Cogn.) Schltr.	Hispaniola	1,000–1,300 metres (3,300–4,300 ft)
	Neocogniauxia monophylla (Griseb.) Schltr.	Jamaica	1,000–1,600 metres (3,300–5,200 ft)
