= Whistling masked flowerpiercer =

Conservation status
- Not evaluated (IUCN 3.1)

Scientific classification
- Kingdom: Animalia
- Phylum: Chordata
- Class: Aves
- Order: Passeriformes
- Family: Thraupidae
- Genus: Diglossa
- Species: D. melanopis

Binomial name
- Diglossa melanopis Tschudi, 1844

Species of bird

The whistling masked flowerpiercer (Diglossa melanopis) is a species of bird in the tanager family, Thraupidae. It is found in humid montane forest and scrub on the eastern slopes of the Andes in Peru and northern Bolivia. Flowerpiercers got their name from the fact that they have a sharp hook on the tip of their upper mandible which they use to slice open the base of flowers to get at the nectar. This species was formerly considered as being conspecific with the warbling masked flowerpiercer (Diglossa cyanea).

== Taxonomy ==
The whistling masked flowerpiercer was formally described in 1844 by the Swiss naturalist Johann Jakob von Tschudi under the binomial name Diglossa melanopis based on a specimen collected in Peru. The specific epithet combines the Ancient Greek μελας/melas, μελανος/melanos meaning "black" with -ωπις/-ōpis meaning "-faced". In 1935 Carl Eduard Hellmayr restricted the type location to the Department of Junín in central Peru. The whistling masked flowerpiercer was formerly treated as a subspecies of the warbling masked flowerpiercer (Diglossa cyanea). It is now considered as a separate species based on the mitochondrial DNA divergence, vocalization and morphology.

== Description ==
This species is a rich dark blue flowerpiercer, and it is easily recognized by its red eyes and black mask. The body plumage is mostly dark blue, while the wings are black with dark-blue edges. The females are similar in appearance to the males, but the females are duller and have a paler blue plumage above and greyer plumage below. The adults and subadults have a red iris, hooked bill and dark feet and legs, while juveniles and immatures are duller, with a gray iris.

The bill is black, long and thin in the adults; in the juveniles, there is a pale base to the bill.

This species is separated from all of its congeners by the combination of the red iris and blackish facial mask. The range of this species does not overlap with the formerly conspecific warbling masked flowerpiercer, however, the warbling masked flowerpiercer is a larger and darker bird with a paler forecrown, less noticeable white tips to the undertail coverts, and more subtle blue margins on the tertials.

== Habitat ==
The main habitat of this species is montane evergreen forest, however, it is also found in elfin forest, secondary growth and scattered trees and bushes. It has been recorded from an elevation of 1450-3600 m.

== Ecology ==
=== Vocalizations ===
The song is high-pitched, with a few introductory notes followed by a tinkling twitter, and ends with 2-4 flat-pitched whistles. The tsit call is repeated several times at irregular intervals.

=== Diet and foraging ===
This species forages in the upper levels of the forest. It pierces small fruit for juice and makes short flights in the air to capture flying insects. It forages in mixed species flocks, moving quickly amongst mossy branches, twigs and vines. This species feeds on small berries and fruits, especially species of Melastomataceae, and has been recorded feeding on Fuchsia decussata in elfin forest and Oreocallis grandiflora in montane forest in central Peru.

=== Breeding ===
It is likely that this species breeds year-round, as fledglings have been found in March, May, July and December.
