= Tibouchina melastomoides =

Scientific classification
- Kingdom: Plantae
- Clade: Tracheophytes
- Clade: Angiosperms
- Clade: Eudicots
- Clade: Rosids
- Order: Myrtales
- Family: Melastomataceae
- Genus: Tibouchina
- Species: T. melastomoides

Binomial name
- Tibouchina melastomoides (Naudin) Cogn.

Synonyms
- Lasiandra melastomoides Naudin; Pleroma melastomoides (Naudin) Triana; Tibouchina goyazensis Cogn.

Species of flowering plant

Tibouchina melastomoides is a species of flowering plant in the family Melastomataceae, native to Brazil. It was first described in 1850, as Lasiandra melastomoides, by Charles Victor Naudin. The type specimen is kept in Naturhistorisches Museum Wien in Austria.
