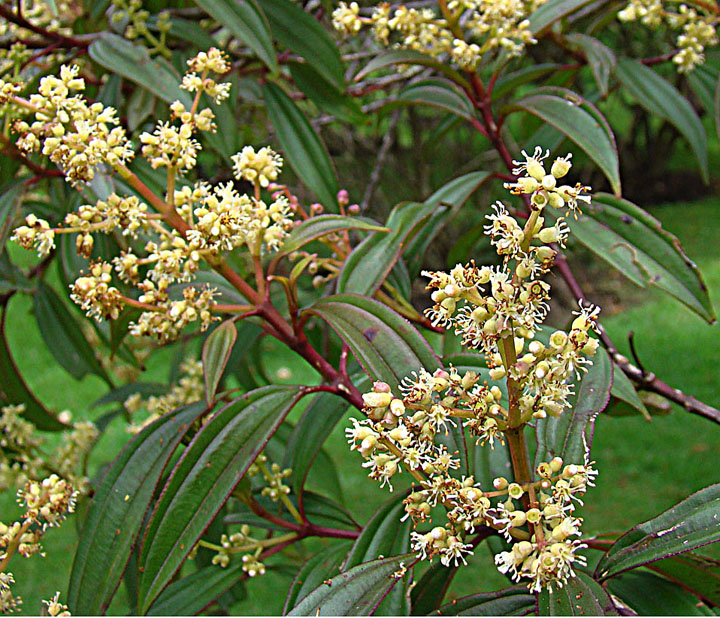
- Axinaea macrophylla

Scientific classification
- Kingdom: Plantae
- Clade: Tracheophytes
- Clade: Angiosperms
- Clade: Eudicots
- Clade: Rosids
- Order: Myrtales
- Family: Melastomataceae
- Genus: Axinaea; Ruiz & Pav.

Synonyms
- Chastenaea DC.

= Axinaea =

Genus of flowering plants

Axinaea is a genus of flowering plants in the family Melastomataceae. As of 2012, there are at least 42 species. They are small trees and shrubs. They are native to the Americas; almost all are found in the Andes.

Plants of this genus are pollinated when birds, several species of fruit-eating tanagers, consume specialized appendages on the stamens. As they grasp the nutritious appendages, a cloud of pollen is released. This has been called "puff pollination".

Species include:

- Axinaea affinis Cogn.
- Axinaea alata E.Cotton
- Axinaea campii E.Cotton
- Axinaea carolina-telleziae Bussmann & Paniagua
- Axinaea colombiana Lozano & Alvear
- Axinaea confusa E.Cotton
- Axinaea costaricensis Cogn.
- Axinaea crassinoda Triana
- Axinaea dentata E.Cotton
- Axinaea dependens Ruiz & Pav.
- Axinaea disrupta E.Cotton
- Axinaea fallax Gleason ex Cuatrec.
- Axinaea fernando-cabiesii Bussmann, J.A.Gruhn & A.Glenn
- Axinaea flava E.Cotton, Bussmann & P.Lozano
- Axinaea floribunda Triana
- Axinaea glandulosa Ruiz & Pav. ex D. Don
- Axinaea glauca E.Cotton & P.Lozano
- Axinaea grandifolia Triana
- Axinaea lanceolata Ruiz & Pav.
- Axinaea lawessonii E.Cotton
- Axinaea lehmannii Cogn.
- Axinaea luteynii E.Cotton
- Axinaea macrophylla Triana
- Axinaea merianiae Triana
- Axinaea mertensioides Wurdack
- Axinaea minutiflora E.Cotton
- Axinaea nitida Cogn.
- Axinaea oblongifolia (Cogn.) Wurdack
- Axinaea pauciflora Cogn.
- Axinaea pendula E.Cotton
- Axinaea pennellii Gleason
- Axinaea quitensis Benoist
- Axinaea reginae Bussmann, Gruhn & A.Glenn
- Axinaea ruizteranii Wurdack
- Axinaea sclerophylla Triana
- Axinaea scutigera Triana
- Axinaea sessilifolia Triana
- Axinaea sodiroi Wurdack
- Axinaea tomentosa Cogn.
- Axinaea wurdackii Sagást., S.J.Arroyo & E.Rodr.
