= Katinka (operetta) =

Operetta composed by Rudolf Friml

Cover of the first Australian edition of the vocal score for Katinka (1918)

Katinka is an operetta in three acts composed by Rudolf Friml to a libretto by Otto Harbach. It was first performed at the Park Theatre in Morristown, New Jersey, on December 2, 1915, with May Naudain in the title role and subsequently received its Broadway premiere on December 23, 1915 at the 44th Street Theatre.

== Background and performance history ==
Katinka marked the third collaboration between Rudolf Friml and his lyricist Otto Harbach. The show's producer, Arthur Hammerstein, had also produced Friml and Harbach's The Firefly (1912) and High Jinks (1913). The work was originally entitled Elaine, after Hammerstein's daughter, who had a small role in High Jinks and according to the New York Times was to have featured in the new production. In the end, Elaine Hammerstein left Broadway to begin a career in movies, and the operetta's name was changed to Katinka.

Katinka was first performed at the Park Theatre in Morristown, New Jersey on December 2, 1915 and subsequently moved to the 44th Street Theatre for its Broadway premiere on December 23, 1915. The production starring May Naudain and Sam Ash as Katinka and Ivan was conducted by John McGhie and directed by Frank Smithson, with set design by Edward Sundquist and costume design by Paul Arlington. The show was an immediate success and ran on Broadway for 220 performances. It also had personal consequences for Friml, who began an affair with one of the chorus singers, Blanche Betters. The couple married in 1917 and divorced acrimoniously two years later, a fact which caused a New York judge to deny his 1921 request to become a naturalized US citizen. Following its Broadway run, Katinka toured to several American cities including Los Angeles, Boston, Baltimore, St. Louis, and Atlanta and had regular revivals in the US until the late 1940s, as well as radio broadcasts. One of its rare 21st century revivals was in November 2009, when it was performed in concert version by the Comic Opera Guild of Ann Arbor, Michigan.

Katinka also enjoyed considerable success outside the United States particularly in Australia and New Zealand. It premiered in New Zealand in April 1918 at the Grand Opera House, Wellington, and in Australia on June 8, 1918 at Her Majesty's Theatre, Melbourne. On both occasions, the title role was sung by Gladys Moncrieff. It was her first starring role and one she was to sing well into the 1940s. Other young performers who appeared in the Australian productions and went on to prominent careers were dancer Robert Helpmann (1930) and actor Cyril Ritchard (1918). Katinka had its UK premiere on August 30, 1923 at the Shaftesbury Theatre with Helen Gilliland in the title role and ran for 108 performances.

== Roles and premiere cast ==
- Boris Strogoff, Russian Ambassador to Austria – Lorrie Grimaldi
- Katinka, his bride – May Naudain
- Tatiana, Katinka's mother – Norma Mendoza
- Ivan Dimitri, attaché to the Russian Ambassador and Katinka's sweetheart – Sam Ash
- Varenka - Katinka's maid – Nina Napier
- Petrov, Boris Strogoff's old servant – Albert Sackett
- Thaddeus Hopper, a wealthy American – Franklin Ardell
- Helen Hopper, Thaddeus Hopper's wife – Adele Rowland
- Olga (Nashan), Boris Strogoff's first wife – Edith Decker
- Halif, a Circassian slave-trader – A. Robins
- Knopf, manager of the Café-Turkois-in-Vienna – W. J. McCarthy (Bernard Gorcey on or before January 14, 1916)
- Abdul, a harem assistant – Daniel Baker
- Arif Bey, warden of Izzet Pasha's harem – Edward Durand
- A spy – Harry Cinton
- M. Pierre, porter at the Hôtel Riche in Constantinople – Gustav Schultz
- Principal dancers – Edmund Makalif, Helen Kroner, May Thompson

== Synopsis ==
May Naudain as Katinka surrounded by her bridesmaids in the Act 1 wedding scene

Setting: Yalta, Istanbul, and Vienna shortly before the outbreak of World War I

Act 1

The play opens in Yalta at a villa on the Black Sea. Reluctantly following her mother's wishes, Katinka marries Boris Strogoff, the Russian Ambassador to Austria, although she is really in love with his attaché, Ivan Dimitri, and he with her. After the wedding, Thaddeus Hopper, a wealthy American and Ivan's friend, helps her escape to Turkey.

Act 2

Ivan and Boris Strogoff's servant Petrov arrive in Istanbul hoping to find Strogoff's first wife Olga, who chose to live in a harem rather than remain married to him. If she is found, Strogoff's marriage to Katinka can be annulled on grounds of bigamy, leaving her free to marry Ivan. Katinka and Thaddeus Hopper are also in the city, where she is staying in Hopper's rooms. The arrival of Hopper's wife, Helen, causes complications when she becomes suspicious of the arrangements. Hopper has arranged for Katinka to be hidden in the harem of Izzet Pasha, but Arif Bey, Pasha's warden, mistakenly carries Mrs. Hopper off to the harem instead of Katinka. Meanwhile, Herr Knopf is planning to open the Café-Turkois-in-Vienna and has come to Istanbul looking for women to work there. Helen is amongst those he takes back to Vienna.

Act 3

The main characters are all in Vienna, where they have assembled at Herr Knopf's café. Olga, who had been living in Izzet Pasha's harem under the name of "Nashan", reveals her true identity. The Hoppers are reconciled, and Katinka and Ivan are reunited.

== Musical numbers ==
Act 1

- Opening Chorus (Varenka and chorus)
- "Vienna Girls" (Ivan and chorus)
- "The Bride" (Boris, Katinka, Tatiana and chorus)
- "One Who Will Understand" (Katinka and chorus)
- Katinka" (Ivan, Boris, and male chorus)
- "In A Hurry" (Thaddeus Hopper and chorus)
- "'Tis the End" (Ivan and Katinka)
- "Russian Dance"
- Finale (ensemble)

Act 2

- Opening Chorus (Olga and chorus)
- "Charms Are Fairest When Hidden" (Olga and chorus)
- "Your Photo" (Mrs Hopper and boys)
- "Allah's Holiday" (Olga and chorus)
- "The Weekly Wedding" (Mr. and Mrs. Hopper)
- "I Want All the World To Know" (Ivan)
- "Circassian Dance" (dancers)
- "Rackety-Coo!" (Katinka and chorus)
- Finale (ensemble)

Act 3

- "My Paradise" (Ivan)
- "Ballet Divertissement" (dancers)
- "Mignonette" (dancers)
- "I Want To Marry A Male Quartet" (Mrs Hopper and boys)
- "Skidikiscatch" (Hopper, Katinka, Ivan, Knopf, Arif and Olga)
- "I Can Tell By The Way That You Dance, Dear" (Mrs Hopper and girls)
- Finale (ensemble)

== Recordings ==
Excerpts from Katinka can be heard on the 1987 recording Rudolf Friml: Chansonette with soprano Teresa Ringholz and the Eastman-Dryden Orchestra conducted by Donald Hunsberger (Arabesque Records).

Rudolf Friml himself plays a piano version of "Allah's Holiday" on Friml plays Friml, recorded at the Studio Mozarteum in Prague in September 1964 (Supraphon).

== Sources ==
- Everett, William (2008). Rudolf Friml. University of Illinois Press. ISBN 0-252-03381-7
- Friml, Rudolf and Harbach, Otto (1916). Katinka. New York: G. Schirmer
- Gänzl, Kurt (2001). The Encyclopedia of the Musical Theatre, 2nd Edition, Volume 1. Gale. ISBN 0-02-864970-2
- Lamb, Andrew M. (February 1987). Review: Rudolf Friml: Chansonette, Arabesque Records Z6562. Gramophone, p. 99
- McKee, Jenn (November 2, 2009). "Comic Opera Guild presents Friml's 'Katinka' and Sousa's 'The Charlatan'". AnnArbor.com
- New York Times (July 14, 1915). "'Elaine', a New Operetta"
- New York Times (September 16, 1915). "Lawrence Haynes in 'Katinka'"
- The Sunday Chronicle, Paterson, New Jersey (July 17, 1921). "Composer Barred from Citizenship", p. 24
- Wlaschin, Ken (2006). Encyclopedia of American opera. McFarland & Company. ISBN 0-7864-2109-6
- Woolf, Jonathan (January 2003). Review: Friml plays Friml, Supraphon SU 3267-2 911. MusicWeb International
