= Tibouchina johnwurdackiana =

Scientific classification
- Kingdom: Plantae
- Clade: Tracheophytes
- Clade: Angiosperms
- Clade: Eudicots
- Clade: Rosids
- Order: Myrtales
- Family: Melastomataceae
- Genus: Tibouchina
- Species: T. johnwurdackiana

Binomial name
- Tibouchina johnwurdackiana Todzia

Species of flowering plant

Tibouchina johnwurdackiana is a species of flowering plant in the family Melastomataceae, native to west central Brazil. It was first described in 1997. The type specimen is kept in the herbarium at Missouri Botanical Garden.
