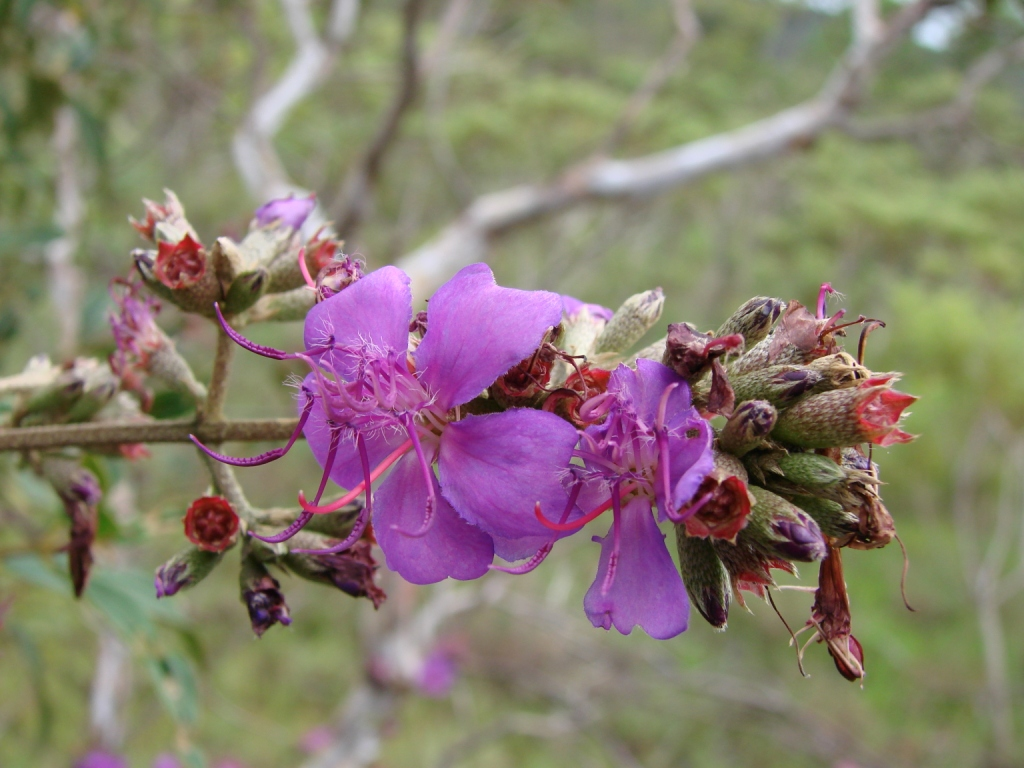

Conservation status
- Least Concern (IUCN 3.1)

Scientific classification
- Kingdom: Plantae
- Clade: Tracheophytes
- Clade: Angiosperms
- Clade: Eudicots
- Clade: Rosids
- Order: Myrtales
- Family: Melastomataceae
- Genus: Tibouchina
- Species: T. papyrus

Binomial name
- Tibouchina papyrus Toledo 1952

= Tibouchina papyrus =

Species of plant

Tibouchina papyrus Toledo was described in 1952. Tibouchina papyrus is a narrow endemic to the campos rupestres and is mainly found in three localities in the states of Goiás and Tocantins in central Brazil, including the Serra da Natividade. Abreu et al. found that T. papyrus is a habitat-specialist on rocky outcrop cerrado which typically has shallow substrate and uneven topography, with sandstone soils and quartzite outcrops. This species has been collected at elevations between 500 and 1,100 metres (1,640 and 3,610 ft). T. papyrus is listed as Least concern by the IUCN, though it is locally endangered. Tibouchina papyrus is locally known as “pau-papel”.

The flowers of T. papyrus are buzz pollinated by large bees in the genera Xylocopa, Bombus and Centris, and the seeds are wind dispersed (autochory). Flowers have higher fruit production when cross-pollinated although they are not self-incompatible and can produce low numbers of fruit when self-pollinated. One study of microsatellite loci showed low levels of polymorphism and low genetic diversity within populations, while another study found that populations of T. papyrus are highly differentiated with little to no gene flow between populations.
