= May Naudain =

American actress

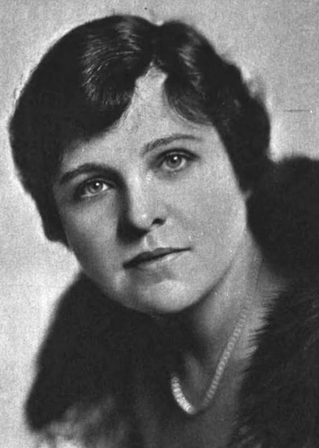
- May Naudain (1917)
- Born: Mary Arnaud Naudain; October 12, 1880; Burlington, Iowa
- Died: February 1923 (aged 42); Jacksonville, Florida
- Other name: May Naudain George (after marriage)
- Occupations: actress and singer
- Years active: 1900–1920
- Known for: musical theatre and operetta

Mary Arnaud "May" Naudain (October 12, 1880 – February 1923) was an American musical theatre actress and singer.

== Early life ==
Naudain was born in 1880 (although some sources give it as 1872) in Burlington, Iowa, and raised in Omaha, Nebraska, the daughter of Thomas Nelson Naudain and Mary M. Calloway. Her father was a banker.

== Career ==
Naudain appeared on Broadway in Babes in Toyland (1903–1904), It Happened in Nordland (1904–1905), Victor Herbert's Concert (1905), His Majesty (1906), The Little Cherub (1906–1907), The Girl Behind the Counter (1907–1908), The Girls of Gottenberg (1908), and Katinka (1915–1916). She made a recording, in 1916, of the hit song "Rackety-Coo" from Katinka. In 1917 she sang on the vaudeville circuit with Anatole Friedland. She toured o\in vaudeville in 1918. In 1919 she sang on Broadway with The Society of American Singers in a production of The Gondoliers.

One writer commented on Naudain's "genuine wholesomeness and refreshing unstaginess". During World War I she gave benefit concerts and raised money for war bonds.

== Personal life ==
Naudain married banker Charles Henry "Harry" George in June, 1909. She died from a heart ailment in Jacksonville, Florida, in 1923. (Note: Her date of death is variously given as February 3 and February 8.)
