= Naudin =

Naudin may refer to:

- Bernard Naudin (1876–1946), French artist
- Charles Victor Naudin (1815–1899), a French botanist
- Emilio Naudin (1823–1890), an Italian operatic tenor
- Gustave Naudin (1890–1978), a French World War I flying ace
- Marcel Naudin (1895–?), French soccer player

== See also ==
- Sizaire-Naudin, a French automobile manufacturer based in Paris between 1905 and 1921
