= Alfred Cogniaux =

Belgian botanist

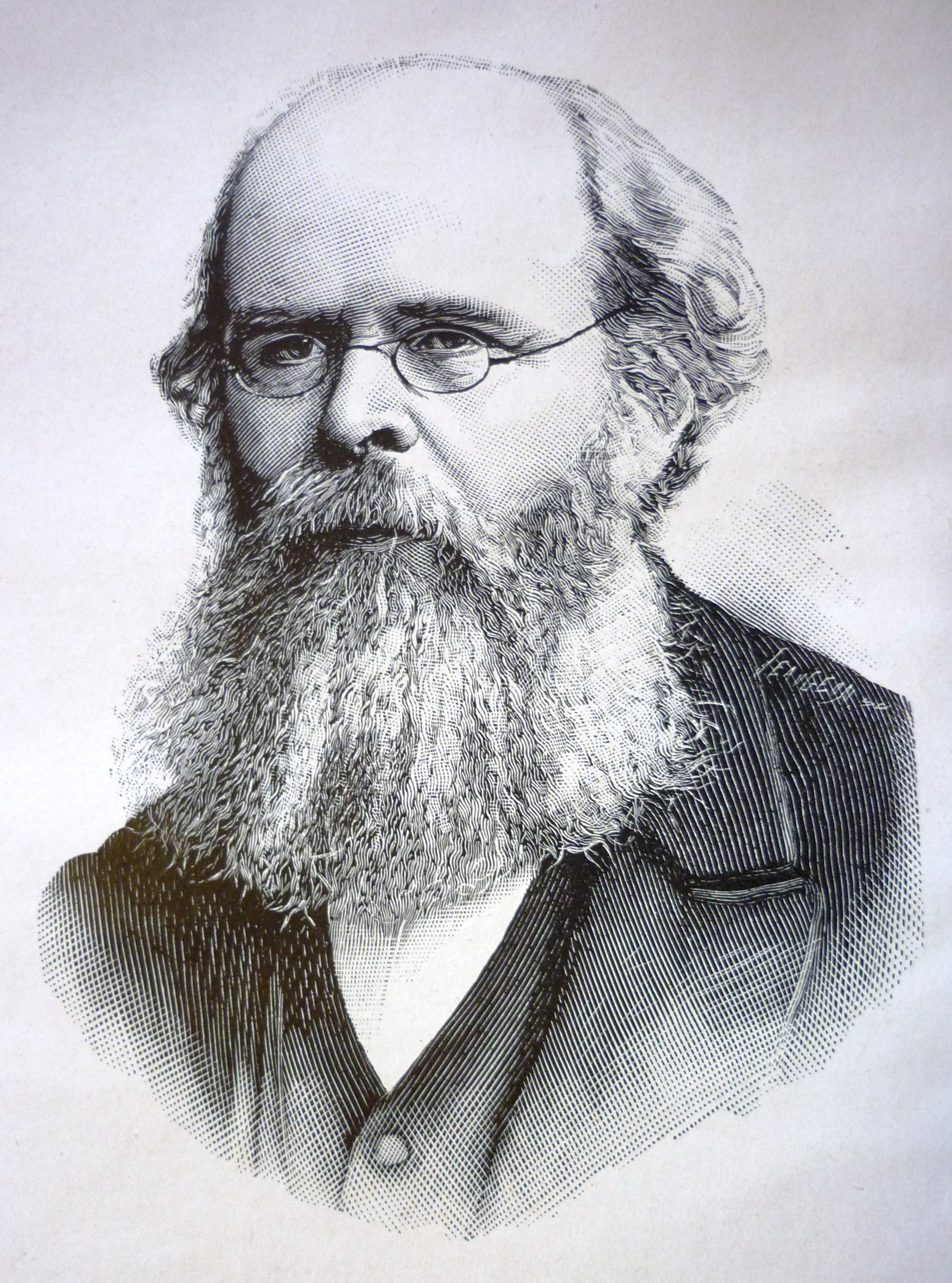
- Born: 7 April 1841; Robechies, Chimay, Belgium
- Died: 15 April 1916 (aged 75); Genappe, Belgium
- Known for: Study of orchids
- Scientific career
- Fields: Botany
- Author abbrev. (botany): Cogn.

Célestin Alfred Cogniaux (7 April 1841 – 15 April 1916) was a Belgian botanist. Amongst other plants, the genus Neocogniauxia of orchids is named after him.

In 1916 his enormous private herbarium was acquired by the National Botanic Garden of Belgium.

== Publications ==
- De Saldanha da Gama, J., Cogniaux, A. Bouquet de Mélastomacées brésiliennes dédiées a Sa Majesté Dom Pedro II empereur du Brésil. A. Remacle, 1887 Verviers.
- Cogniaux, A., Melastomaceae. G. Masson, Paris, 1891
- Cogniaux, Alfredus, Orchidaceae. Vol. III, part IV, V and VI of Flora Brasiliensis. Lipsiae, Frid. Fleischer, 1893–1906
- Linden, L., Cogniaux, A. & Grignan, G., Les orchidées exotiques et leur culture en Europe. (Bruxelles; Paris. chez l'auteur. Octave Doin, 1894.
- Cogniaux, A., Goossens, A.: Dictionnaire Iconographique des Orchidées; 2 vol. 1896–1907. Perthes en Gâtinais (France), Institut des Jardins. 1990 ISBN 2-908041-01-4
- Cogniaux, A., Harms, H. Cucurbitaceae-Cucurbiteae-Cucumerinae (2 vols.) W. Engelmann, Leipzig,1924.

With Élie Marchal he edited the exsiccata Les Glumacées de Belgique (1869–1871)

== Bibliography ==
- Jacquet, Pierre (2003). "Un orchidologue belge digne de mémoire : Alfred Cogniaux (1841–1916)". L'Orchidophile (in French).
