= Illicium hottense =

Conservation status
- Endangered (IUCN 3.1)

Scientific classification
- Kingdom: Plantae
- Clade: Tracheophytes
- Clade: Angiosperms
- Order: Austrobaileyales
- Family: Schisandraceae
- Genus: Illicium
- Species: I. hottense

Binomial name
- Illicium hottense A.Guerrero, Judd & A.B.Morris

Species of flowering plant

Illicium hottense is a species of flowering plant in the family Schisandraceae. It is a shrub or tree with leathery leaves, yellow and pink flowers, and brown seeds. The species is native to Haiti, and is used for charcoal and as a star anise substitute.

Illicium hottense was described in 2004, and is listed as Endangered by the IUCN.

== Taxonomy ==
The species was described in 2004, by Angela Guerrero, Walter Stephen Judd, and Ashley B. Morris. It was previously confused with Illicium ekmanii.

Illicium hottense is part of the section Cymbostemon and the subsection Parviflorum, along with Illicium ekmanii, Illicium parviflorum, and Illicium cubense.

== Distribution ==
Illicium hottense is native to the wet tropical biome of Massif de la Hotte, Haiti. It grows in Pinus occidentalis forests, and has been found in association with Alchornea latifolia, Besleria lutea, Cecropia peltata, Cestrum bicolor, Chrysophyllum argenteum, Coccoloba costata, Miconia subhirsuta, Varronia lima, Frodinia tremula, Eugenia christii, Eugenia foetida, Ficus, Hamelia patens, Hieronyma domingensis, Lobelia robusta, Lunania mauritii, Maytenus hotteana, Miconia laevigata, Miconia prasina, Miconia subcompressa, Myrcia tiburoniana, Myrsine coriacea, Parathesis serrulata, Phyllanthus myriophyllus, Piper hispidum, Piper oviedoi, Piper umbellatum, Pisonia aculeata, Palicourea pubescens, Gesneria bicolor, Sapium haitiense, Sideroxylon cubense, Sloanea ilicifolia, Sphyrospermum buxifolium, Tabebuia conferta, Tapura haitiensis, Terminalia domingensis, Chaetogastra longifolia, and Turpinia picardae.

The species is present at elevations of 750–1,560 metres (2,460–5,120 ft). Its estimated extent of occurrence is 2,084 square kilometres (805 sq mi).

== Description ==
Illicium hottense is a shrub or small tree that grows up to 4 metres (13 ft) high.

The leaves are thinly leathery, dull green to olivaceous, elliptical to obovate-elliptical, 3.5–9.2 centimetres (1.4–3.6 in) long, and 1.4–3.6 centimetres (0.55–1.42 in) wide. The leaf stems are 7–13 millimetres (0.28–0.51 in) long.

The flowers are solitary, and grow on 3.5–10 millimetres (0.14–0.39 in) long stems. The flowers have sixteen to twenty tepals, which are orbicular to deltoid, and yellowish with pink tinges. The outer tepals are ovate, and up to 7 millimetres (0.28 in). The inner tepals are orbicular, and up to 4 millimetres (0.16 in) long. The flowers have six or eight stamens, and ten to thirteen carpels.

The follicles form a star-like cluster. The seeds are smooth, brown to straw-coloured, 4.8–5.5 millimetres (0.19–0.22 in) long, and 3.5–4 millimetres (0.14–0.16 in) wide.

The species' generation length is fifteen to thirty years.

== Uses ==
Illicium hottense is used for charcoal. The fruits are used as a substitute for star anise.

== Conservation ==
In 2020, the IUCN assessed Illicium hottense as Endangered. It is threatened by fire, agriculture, and use for charcoal. The estimated number of mature individuals is between five hundred and one thousand. It occurs in protected areas, including Pic Macaya National Park and Grand Bois National Park.

== Nomenclature ==
The specific epithet hottense refers to the Massif de la Hotte. In French, the species is known as Bois graine noire, Bois graine, or Anis étoilé marron.
