= List of plants known as star anise =

Star anise refers to Illicium verum Chinese star anise, and the spice derived from it. It can also refer to related poisonous plants:

- Illicium anisatum, Japanese star anise, similar in appearance to Illicium verum
- Illicium floridanum, a shrub of the southeastern United States
- Illicium parviflorum, swamp star anise, of the southeastern United States
