= Merrilactone A =

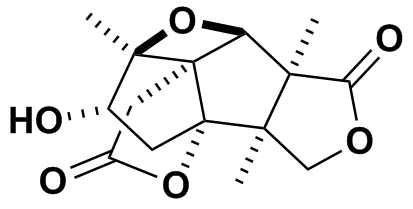

Names
- Preferred IUPAC name (1aS,2S,3aS,3bS,6aS,6bR)-2-Hydroxy-1a,3b,6a-trimethylhexahydro-3H,6H-3a,1a^{1}-(epoxyethano)oxeto[2′,3′,4′:3,4]pentaleno[1,2-c]furan-6,8-dione
- Other names (+)-Merrilactone A

Identifiers
CAS Number	301842-37-5
3D model (JSmol)	Interactive image
ChemSpider	8101770
PubChem CID	9926135
UNII	DZS2XP3QH2
- InChI: InChI=1S/C15H18O6/c1-11-6-19-10(18)12(11,2)9-14-5-8(17)20-15(11,14)4-7(16)13(14,3)21-9/h7,9,16H,4-6H2,1-3H3/t7-,9-,11+,12-,13+,14+,15-/m0/s1 Key: RJVZPYYKUUJWSI-YTDOHZAMSA-N; InChI=1/C15H18O6/c1-11-6-19-10(18)12(11,2)9-14-5-8(17)20-15(11,14)4-7(16)13(14,3)21-9/h7,9,16H,4-6H2,1-3H3/t7-,9-,11+,12-,13+,14+,15-/m0/s1 Key: RJVZPYYKUUJWSI-YTDOHZAMBW
- SMILES: O=C2OC[C@]3([C@]54OC(=O)C[C@@]51[C@](O[C@H]1[C@@]23C)([C@@H](O)C4)C)C

Properties
Chemical formula	C_{15}H_{18}O_{6}
Molar mass	294.303 g·mol^{−1}
- Except where otherwise noted, data are given for materials in their standard state (at 25 °C [77 °F], 100 kPa). verify (what is ?) Infobox references

Merrilactone A is one of the four sesquiterpenes that were newly discovered from the fruit of Illicium merrillianum in 2000. Members of the genus Illicium include Chinese star anise, widely used as a spice for flavouring food and beverages, and also poisonous plants such as Japanese star anise. Chemical studies of Illicium have developed rapidly over the last 20 years, and merrilactone A has been shown to have neurotrophic activity in fetal rat cortical neuron cultures. This has led researchers to believe that Merrilactone A may hold therapeutic potential in the treatment of neuro-degenerative diseases such as Alzheimer's disease and Parkinson's disease.

== Occurrence ==
Merrilactone A occurs naturally in Illicium merrillianum, a plant indigenous to southern China and Myanmar. The genus Illicium belongs to the family Illiciaceae and is an evergreen shrub or tree. Approximately 40 species are disjunctively distributed in eastern North America, Mexico, the West Indies, and eastern Asia. The highest concentration of species is in northern Myanmar and southern China, where nearly 35 species have been described. The fruits of the Illicium species are distinctive star-shaped follicles that have a characteristic refreshing flavour. The fruits of Illicium merrillianum also have an aromatic odor, bland taste and cause numbness of the tongue when chewed.

The only economically important product from this genus is the fruit of Illicium verum, or Chinese star anise, which is widely used as a spice for flavouring food and beverages. In contrast, the fruit of Japanese star anise, Illicium anisatum, have been known to be very toxic for several centuries.

== Biological activity ==
Merrilactone A was found to exhibit a significant neurotrophic activity, such as greatly promoting neurite outgrowth in the primary cultures of fetal rat cortical neurons at concentrations from 10 to 0.1 μmol/L. It was also found that this compound had a property of neuroprotection at same concentration.

== Biosynthesis ==
This compound is originated from mevalonic acid pathway which produce dimethylallyl diphosphate (DMAPP) from acetyl-CoA. Three DMAPPs, or one DMAPP and two isopentenyl diphosphate (IPP), are made into a farnesyl diphosphate (FPP), which is the fundamental precursor of sesquiterpene, and then sesquiterpene cyclise enzymes cause it a cyclization. The synthesis up to here is well known, though process after the first cyclization was unclear. Anislactone-type sesquiterpenes which merrilactone A belongs to has been thought to be biosynthesized from majucin since they have γ-lactone. However, this pathway has trouble to elucidate some configurations and other feature they have. The biosynthesis shown in the figure was newly proposed and solved these problems. The point of this pathway is that seco-prezizaane, anislactone and tashironin group which are all found in Illicium are all derived from the same intermediate 6. This is expected to be able to give all characteristic sesquiterpenes in Illicium plants a reasonable explanation of biosynthesis.

== Total synthesis ==
Since the discovery of merrilactone A, many methods of total synthesis have been proposed, of which four produce racemic material, and two produce the natural enantiomer.
