= Illicium gansuense =

Scientific classification
- Kingdom: Plantae
- Clade: Tracheophytes
- Clade: Angiosperms
- Order: Austrobaileyales
- Family: Schisandraceae
- Genus: Illicium
- Species: I. gansuense

Binomial name
- Illicium gansuense Z.F.Bai & Xue L.Chen
- Illicium gansuense range

Species of flowering plant

Illicium gansuense is a species of flowering plant in the family Schisandraceae. It is a tree with leathery leaves, red flowers, and brown seeds. The species is native to China, and was described in 2023.

== Taxonomy ==
The species was described in 2023, by Zengfu Bai and Xuelin Chen. It was discovered in Giant Panda National Park.

== Distribution ==
Illicium gansuense is native to the temperate biome of Gansu, China. It has been found growing near Trachycarpus fortunei, Camphora septentrionalis, Lindera aggregata, and Calamagrostis effusiflora, at an elevation of 1,200 metres (3,900 ft).

== Description ==
Illicium gansuense is a tree that grows 4–12 metres (13–39 ft) high, and 22.5 centimetres (8.9 in) wide at breast height. The bark is greyish-brown, with irregular cracks. The branches are dense, and spread horizontally. The canopy is conical or tower-shaped. The whole plant is reported to have an aniseed-like aroma.

The leaves are oblanceolate, leathery, glossy, 7–12 centimetres (2.8–4.7 in) long, and 1.8–3.5 centimetres (0.71–1.38 in) wide. The leaves are clustered at the ends of twigs, in groups of two to five. The leaf stems are 8–12 millimetres (0.31–0.47 in) long.

The inflorescences have 8–14 millimetres (0.31–0.55 in) long stems. The inflorescences have a single flower, but the flowers may also be clustered in groups of two to six. The flowers grow on 5–12 millimetres (0.20–0.47 in) long stems.

Flowers

The flowers are 12–18 millimetres (0.47–0.71 in) wide, and have ten to seventeen tepals, which have small hairs on the margins. The tepals are arranged in two or three whorls. The outer whorl has five to seven tepals, which are ovate, 6–8 millimetres (0.24–0.31 in) long, 5–7 millimetres (0.20–0.28 in) wide, and yellowish-green with red margins. The inner whorl has eight to ten tepals, which are ovate to elliptical, 8–12 millimetres (0.31–0.47 in) long, 4–8 millimetres (0.16–0.31 in) wide, fleshy, and red. The flowers have both male and female reproductive organs. They have ten to fourteen carpels, and twenty-three to twenty-seven stamens. The plant flowers from March to April.

The plant fruits from May to November. The seeds are smooth, ovoid, brown, 4.5–6 millimetres (0.18–0.24 in) long, 4–5 millimetres (0.16–0.20 in) wide, and 1.5–2.5 millimetres (0.059–0.098 in) thick.

Illicium gansuense is morphologically similar to Illicium ternstroemioides and Illicium arborescens.

== Nomenclature ==
Illicium gansuense is named for a province in eastern China. The describing authors suggested 甘肃八角 (gān sù bā jiǎo) as a Chinese name for the species.
