= C15H18O6 =

The molecular formula C_{15}H_{18}O_{6} (molar mass: 294.30 g/mol, exact mass: 294.1103 u) may refer to:

- Dihydropicrotoxinin
- Merrilactone A
- Tutin
