= Illiciaceae =

Formerly recognized family of flowering plants

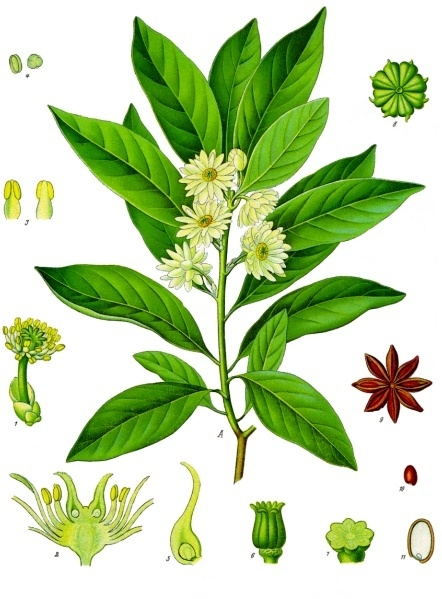
from Koehler (1887)

Illiciaceae A.C.Sm. was a family of flowering plants recognized in a number of systems of plant taxonomy. The Illiciaceae is not recognized as a distinct family by the APG III system of plant taxonomy, the most well accepted system in use today.

The APG II system allows Illiciaceae to be treated as part of another family, the Schisandraceae, or allows the optional segregation of the Illiciaceae from the Schisandraceae. The Illiciaceae as an optional segregate family then has the traditional circumscription of other taxonomic systems, consisting of a single genus, Illicium. The updated APG III system of 2009 does not recognize this family and includes Illicium in the Schisandraceae.

== Description ==
The family consists of shrubs or small trees usually with volatile aromatic compounds. The leaves are evergreen, simple, alternate, spiral (sometimes crowded towards the tips of the twigs), leathery, petiolate, pinnately veined, non-sheathing, gland-dotted or not gland-dotted; also are aromatic, or without marked odour. The lamina is entire.

The flowers are hermaphrodite, and usually showy, ranging in size from small to large, and composed of numerous distinct parts that change grade slightly as they spiral around the receptacle. The parts begin with a perianth of whorled tepals, with the outer whorls more sepaloid, graduating to more petaloid inner tepals. The stamens are also numerous and in a whorl. The carpels are arranged in a whorl, are separate, and number from 5 to numerous carpels in each whorl, each carpel containing a single ovule.

The stem presents nodes unilacunar (with one trace), with internal phloem absent, secondary thickening developing from a conventional cambial ring, xylem with tracheids; The sieve-tube plastids are S-type.

The fruit is non-fleshy; the fruiting carpel is dehiscent, with a follicle (the cycle of follicles often spreading radially in a stellate pattern) and presents only one seed. The seeds are copiously endospermic and oily. The embryo is well differentiated (very small), achlorophyllous. The germination is phanerocotylar.

== Phytochemistry ==
Leaves bear essential oils. Proanthocyanidins present (cyanidin and delphinidin). Flavonols present (kaempferol and quercetin). The fruits produce 2.5 – 5% of essential oil (Anethole, 80–90%, chavicol, safrol, shikimic acid); also contents veranisatins A, B and C and merrilactons.

== Distribution and species ==
The single genus, Illicium, has about 40 species native to sub-tropical and tropical Southeast Asia and the southeastern United States, the Caribbean, and parts of Mexico.

Species

- Illicium verum
- Illicium floridanum
- Illicium henryi
- Illicium parviflorum
- Illicium anisatum

For further details of placement in various systems see the entry for family Schisandraceae.
