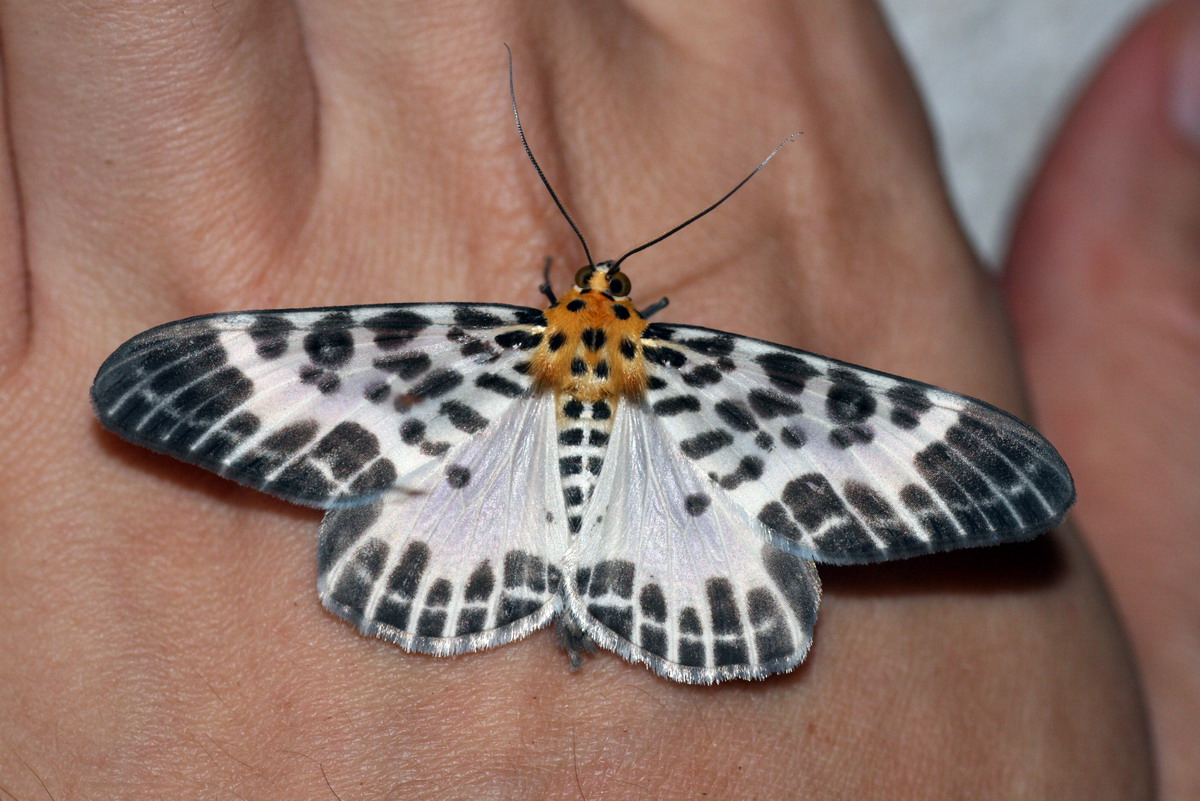
- Malaya, Fraser's Hill

Scientific classification
- Domain: Eukaryota
- Kingdom: Animalia
- Phylum: Arthropoda
- Class: Insecta
- Order: Lepidoptera
- Family: Geometridae
- Genus: Pogonopygia
- Species: P. nigralbata

Binomial name
- Pogonopygia nigralbata Warren, 1894

Synonyms
- Dilophodes conspicuaria Leech, 1915

= Pogonopygia nigralbata =

Species of moth

Pogonopygia nigralbata is a moth of the family Geometridae. It is found in Peninsular Malaysia, Sumatra, Borneo, Japan, the north-eastern Himalaya, northern Vietnam and Luzon.

The wingspan is 46–53 mm.

The larvae feed on Illicium species in Japan.

== Subspecies ==
- Pogonopygia nigralbata nigralbata (Japan, north-eastern Himalaya, northern Vietnam, Luzon)
- Pogonopygia nigralbata attenuata Warren, 1897 (Peninsular Malaysia, Sumatra, Borneo)
