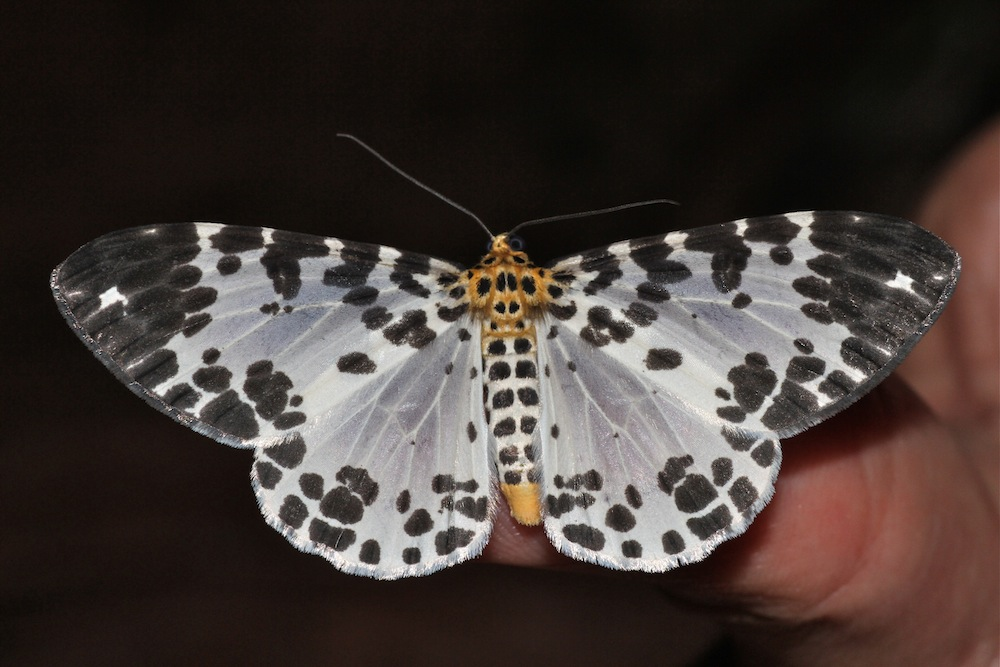
- Dilophodes elegans auribasis from Sabah on the island of Borneo

Scientific classification
- Domain: Eukaryota
- Kingdom: Animalia
- Phylum: Arthropoda
- Class: Insecta
- Order: Lepidoptera
- Family: Geometridae
- Tribe: Boarmiini
- Genus: Dilophodes; Warren, 1894

Type species
- Dilophodes elegans Butler, 1878

= Dilophodes =

Genus of moths

Dilophodes is a genus of moths in the family Geometridae.

== Species ==
- Dilophodes amplificata Bastelberger, 1905
- Dilophodes auribasis Prout, 1926 = Dilophodes elegans auribasis Prout, 1926 (Borneo)
- Dilophodes baria Prout, 1932 = Pogonopygia pavida baria Prout, 1932 (Borneo)
- Dilophodes contaminata Inoue, 1971 = Pogonopygia pavida contaminata Inoue, 1971 (Japan)
- Dilophodes elegans Butler, 1878
- Dilophodes khasiana Swinhoe, 1892 = Dilophodes elegans khasiana Swinhoe, 1892 (Taiwan)
- Dilophodes pavida Bastelberger, 1911 = Pogonopygia pavida Bastelberger, 1911
- Dilophodes sinica Wehrli, 1939 = *Dilophodes elegans sinica Wehrli, 1939 (China)
- Dilophodes xanthura Prout, 1928 = Pogonopygia pavida xanthura Prout, 1928 (Sumatra, Peninsular Malaysia)
