= Illicium tenuifolium =

Conservation status
- Conservation Dependent (IUCN 2.3)

Scientific classification
- Kingdom: Plantae
- Clade: Tracheophytes
- Clade: Angiosperms
- Order: Austrobaileyales
- Family: Schisandraceae
- Genus: Illicium
- Species: I. tenuifolium

Binomial name
- Illicium tenuifolium (Ridley) A.C.Sm.

Species of tree

Illicium tenuifolium is a species of flowering plant in the family Schisandraceae (previously, the Illiciaceae). It is a tree native to Indo-China and Peninsular Malaysia. It grows in tropical forests, including cloud forests.

== Description ==
Illicium tenuifolium is a small slender tree that is approximately ten to fifteen meters in height. The girth of the Illicium tenuifolium is approximately twenty to thirty centimeters. The genus of this plant species is Illicium, belonging to the family Schisandraceae.

=== Leaves ===
Leaves are arranged in a whorl pattern around the node of the stem containing about three to four leaves per node. The leaves are composed on the stem that arise from a single point known as a palmate compound leaf. The physical structure of the leaves are noted to be very thin, leathery and somewhat stiff to the touch. When the leaves are dried along the secondary veins, the leaves become disfigured having a chartaceous characteristic that is a flat paper trait. The leaves are also narrower in shape.

The venation in the leaves run in a reticulate venation where the midrib, which gives support to the leaf, and secondary (and even tertiary) veins are seen.

=== Flowers ===
The petals of I. tenuifolim are white in colour along its base, which later fades into a pink or red close to the tips of the petal. The arrangement of the petal is noted to be in a cup-like structure, encasing the stamen and ovary in a cluster of seven to eight petals per flower.

The pedicels that attach the flower to the flowering branch is ten to fifty millimeters in length.

Pollen grains are described morphologically as trisyncolpate.

=== Fruit ===
When the fruit that is produced by I. tenuifolium are under development, they have a hue that is green or reddish in colour. When the fruit are fully developed, they appear to be a woody with a brown colour.

Illicium tenuifolium contains eight carpels; with the fruit comprising up to thirteen follicles.

== Hazard ==
Illicium tenuifolium is considered to be a problem residential and urban areas due to its vigorous growth alongside various buildings and infrastructure.

== Etymology ==
Illicium is derived from Latin and means 'seductive'. The name is in reference to the plant's fragrance.

Tenuifolium means 'slender-leaved', or 'tenuous-leaved'.
