= Caloptilia illicii =

Scientific classification
- Kingdom: Animalia
- Phylum: Arthropoda
- Class: Insecta
- Order: Lepidoptera
- Family: Gracillariidae
- Genus: Caloptilia
- Species: C. illicii

Binomial name
- Caloptilia illicii Kumata, 1966

Species of moth

Caloptilia illicii is a moth of the family Gracillariidae. It is known from the islands of Honshū, Kyūshū and Shikoku in Japan.

The wingspan is 15–16.5 mm.

The larvae feed on Illicium religiosum and Illicium tashiroi. They probably mine the leaves of their host plant.
