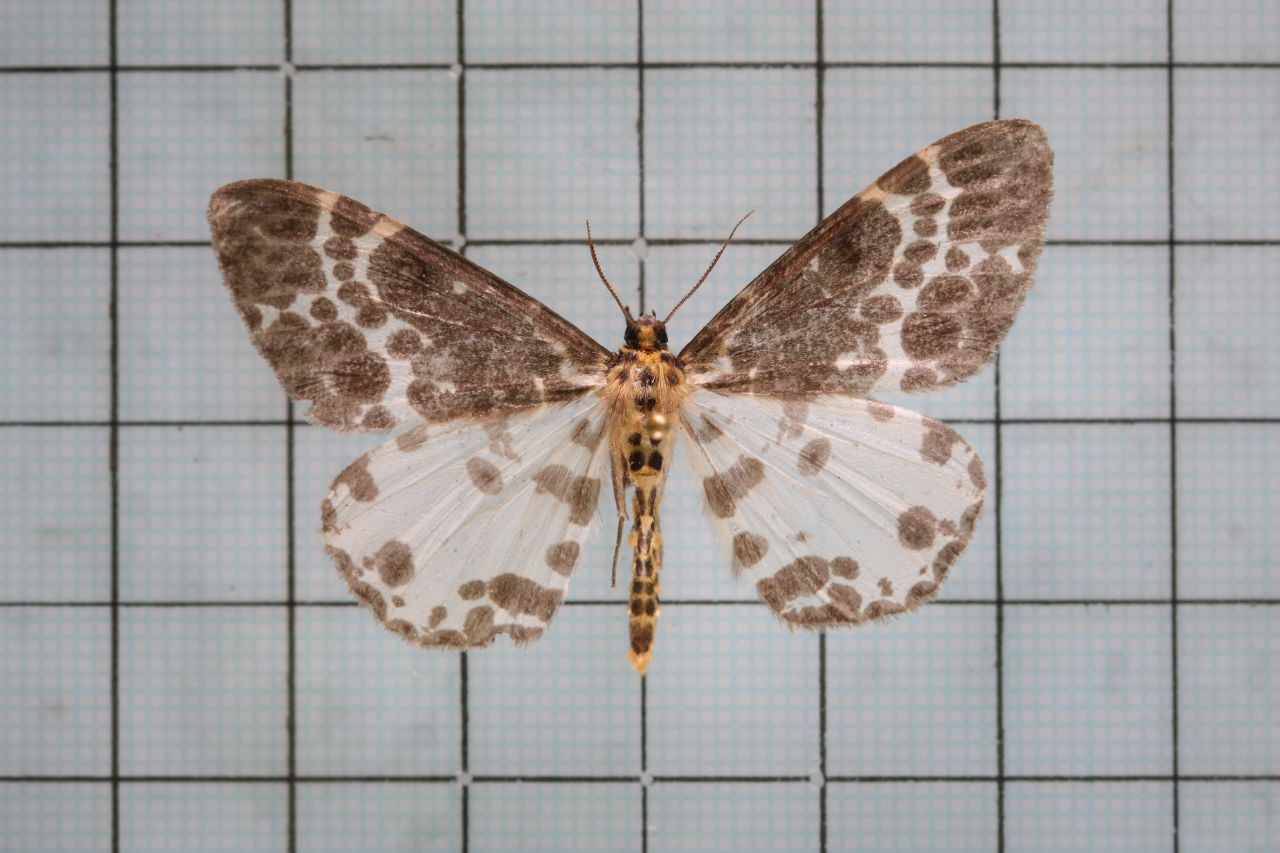
- Dilophodes elegans khasiana
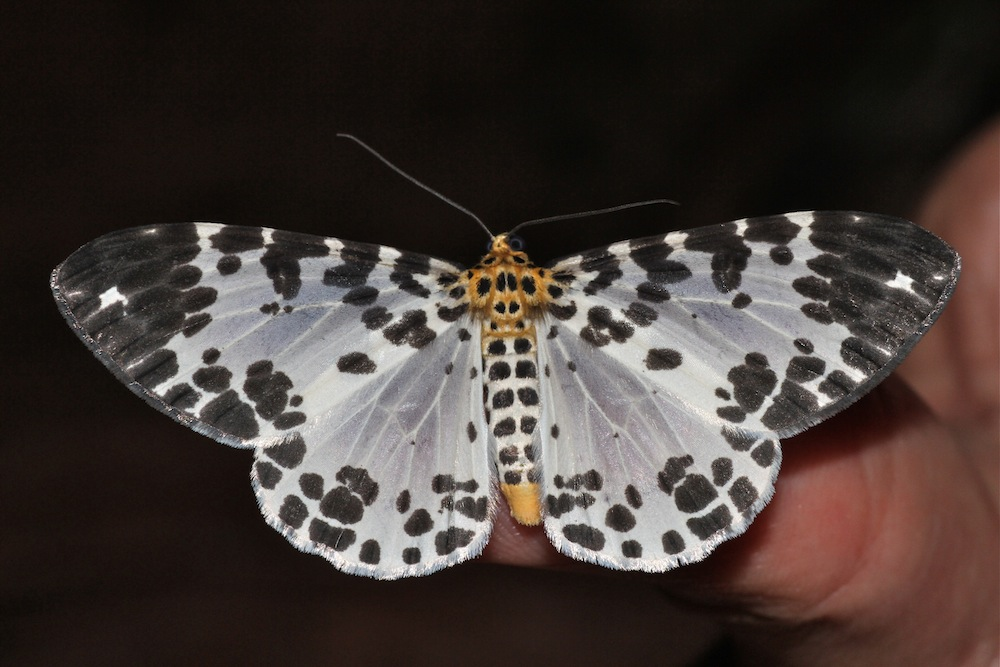
- Dilophodes elegans auribasis from Sabah

Scientific classification
- Domain: Eukaryota
- Kingdom: Animalia
- Phylum: Arthropoda
- Class: Insecta
- Order: Lepidoptera
- Family: Geometridae
- Genus: Dilophodes
- Species: D. elegans

Binomial name
- Dilophodes elegans (Butler, 1878)

Synonyms
- Abraxas elegans Butler, 1878; Abraxas khasiana Swinhoe, 1892

= Dilophodes elegans =

Species of moth

Dilophodes elegans is a moth in the family Geometridae first described by Arthur Gardiner Butler in 1878. It is found in Japan, China, Taiwan, north-eastern Himalaya, Burma and Borneo.

The wingspan 39–43 mm. There are five overlapping generations per year in Nanning, China.

The larvae defoliate Illicium verum. The species overwinters in the larval or pupal stage in the leaves, litter or the epipedon.

== Subspecies ==
- Dilophodes elegans elegans (Japan)
- Dilophodes elegans auribasis Prout, 1926 (north-eastern Himalaya, Burma, Borneo)
- Dilophodes elegans khasiana Swinhoe, 1892 (Taiwan)
- Dilophodes elegans sinica Wehrli, 1939 (China)
