= Illicium stapfii =

Conservation status
- Least Concern (IUCN 3.1)

Scientific classification
- Kingdom: Plantae
- Clade: Embryophytes
- Clade: Tracheophytes
- Clade: Spermatophytes
- Clade: Angiosperms
- Order: Austrobaileyales
- Family: Schisandraceae
- Genus: Illicium
- Species: I. stapfii

Binomial name
- Illicium stapfii Merr.

Synonyms
- Illicium cauliflorum Merr.; Illicium kinabaluense A.C.Sm.; Illicium peninsulare A.C.Sm.

Species of tree

Illicium stapfii is a tree in the family Schisandraceae. It is named for the Austrian botanist Otto Stapf.

== Description ==
Illicium stapfii grows up to 25 m (80 ft) tall, with a trunk diameter of up to 80 cm (30 in). The leaves are elliptic and measure up to 11.5 cm (4.5 in) long, occasionally to 16.5 cm (6.5 in). The solitary flowers are purple to pink.

== Distribution and habitat ==
Illicium stapfii is endemic to Borneo. Its habitat is in forests, at elevations of 800–2,000 m (3,000–7,000 ft).
