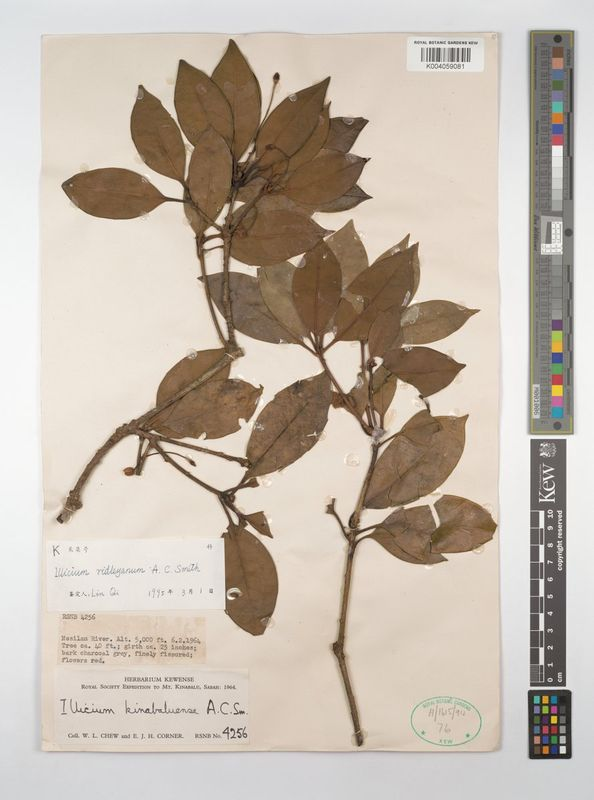

Scientific classification
- Kingdom: Plantae
- Clade: Embryophytes
- Clade: Tracheophytes
- Clade: Angiosperms
- Order: Austrobaileyales
- Family: Schisandraceae
- Genus: Illicium
- Species: I. ridleyanum

Binomial name
- Illicium ridleyanum A.C.Sm.

Synonyms
- Illicium cambodianum var. crassifolium Ridl.

= Illicium ridleyanum =

Species of flowering plant

Illicium ridleyanum is a species of flowering plant in the family Schisandraceae. It is a tree native to Malaysia, and was described in 1947.

== Taxonomy ==
The species was first described in 1947, by Albert Charles Smith.

== Distribution ==
Illicium ridleyanum is native to the wet tropical biome of Peninsular Malaysia.

== Description ==
Illicium ridleyanum is a tree.

== Nomenclature ==
In Chinese, the species is known as 馬來半島八角 (ma lai ban dao ba jiao).
