= Illicium ternstroemioides =

Conservation status
- Vulnerable (IUCN 2.3)

Scientific classification
- Kingdom: Plantae
- Clade: Embryophytes
- Clade: Tracheophytes
- Clade: Spermatophytes
- Clade: Angiosperms
- Order: Austrobaileyales
- Family: Schisandraceae
- Genus: Illicium
- Species: I. ternstroemioides

Binomial name
- Illicium ternstroemioides A.C.Sm.

Species of tree

Illicium ternstroemioides is a species of tree in the family Schisandraceae, or alternately, the Illiciaceae. It is native to northern Vietnam and Hainan Island in China.

This tree grows up to 12 meters tall. Leathery, pointed, ovate leaves up to 13 centimeters long are borne in clusters along the branches. The flower has 10 to 14 papery to somewhat fleshy red tepals of varying lengths, up to 1.2 centimeters. The fruit is a star-shaped whorl of 12 to 14 follicles each up to 2 centimeters long. Each contains a seed, which is poisonous.

The tree grows in ravines and near rivers in forest habitat.

== Etymology ==
Illicium is derived from Latin and means 'seductive'. The name is in reference to the plant's fragrance.

Ternstroemioides means 'resembling Ternstroemia'.
