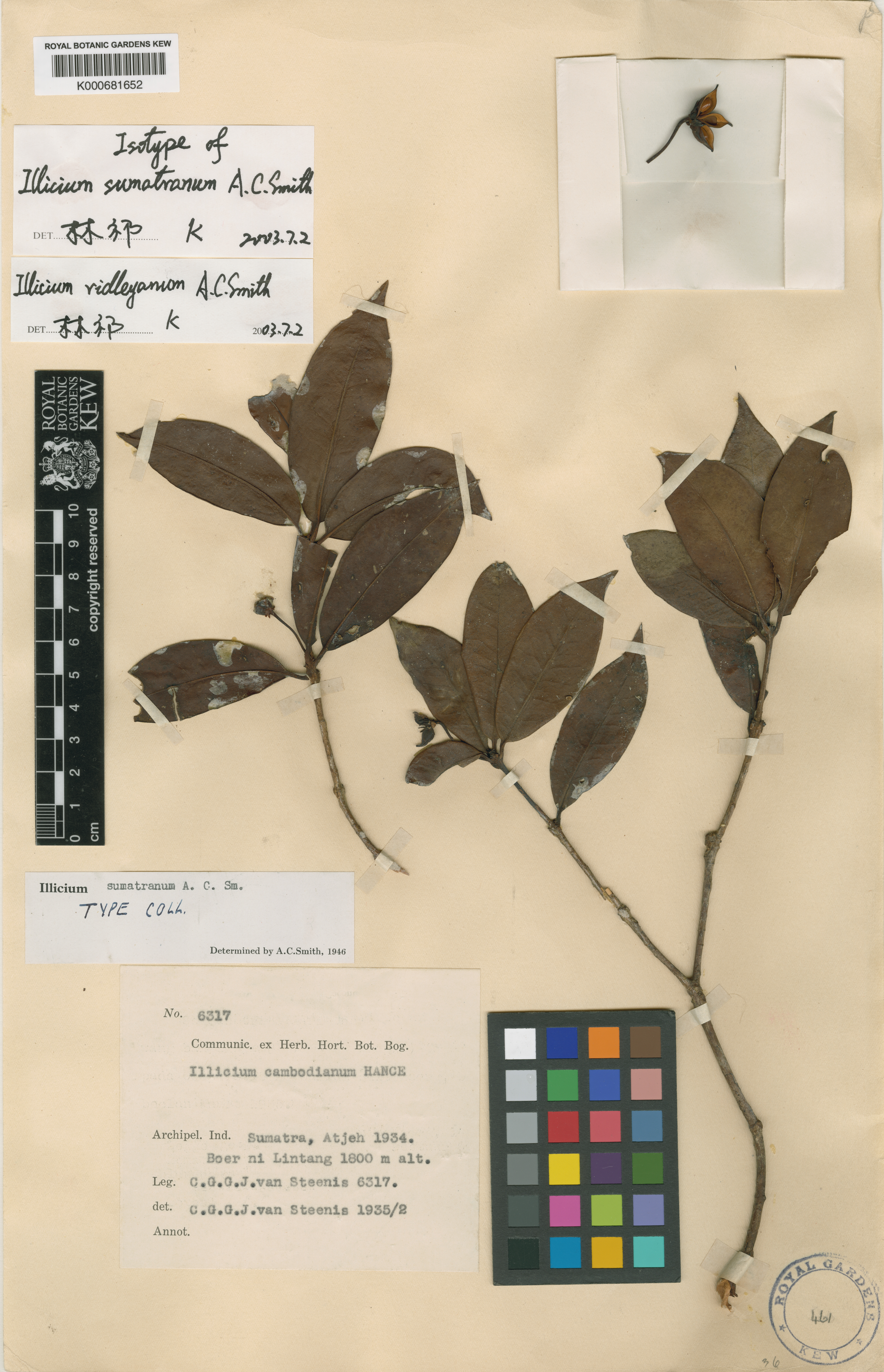

Conservation status
- Least Concern (IUCN 3.1)

Scientific classification
- Kingdom: Plantae
- Clade: Embryophytes
- Clade: Tracheophytes
- Clade: Angiosperms
- Order: Austrobaileyales
- Family: Schisandraceae
- Genus: Illicium
- Species: I. sumatranum

Binomial name
- Illicium sumatranum A.C.Sm.

= Illicium sumatranum =

Species of flowering plant

Illicium sumatranum is a species of flowering plant in the family Schisandraceae. It is a tree native to Sumatra. The species was described in 1947, and is listed as of Least Concern by the IUCN.

== Taxonomy ==
The species was described by Albert Charles Smith in 1947.

== Distribution ==
Illicium sumatranum is native to the wet tropical biome of Sumatra. It has been recorded in Aceh, North Sumatra, and West Sumatra. The species' extent of occurrence is around 27,441 square kilometres (10,595 sq mi).

The species grows in montane forests (including Sumatran montane rain forests, Sumatran tropical pine forests, and forest margins), at elevations of 1,000–2,000 metres (3,300–6,600 ft).

== Description ==
Illicium sumatranum is a tree.

== Conservation ==
In 2020, the IUCN assessed Illicium sumatranum as of Least Concern. The species may be threatened by deforestation, though it occurs in protected areas, including Kerinci Seblat National Park.
