= Illicium guajaibonense =

Scientific classification
- Kingdom: Plantae
- Clade: Tracheophytes
- Clade: Angiosperms
- Order: Austrobaileyales
- Family: Schisandraceae
- Genus: Illicium
- Species: I. guajaibonense

Binomial name
- Illicium guajaibonense (Imkhan.) Judd & J.R. Abbott

Species of flowering plant

Illicium guajaibonense is a shrub endemic to Pinar del Rio in Western Cuba. It has only recently been recognized as a distinct species; previously it was considered to be subspecies of I. cubense. I. guajaibonense differs from I. cubense in flower color and other characters.

== Range and biodiversity ==
Illicium guajaibonense can only be found in the bauxitic soils of Pinar del Rio . It resides in evergreen dry forests at elevations of 500–600 m. The soils of these forests contain high concentrations of bauxite. The small population is critically endangered.

== Key features ==
Illicium guajaibonense grows as a shrub and can be up to 2 meters tall. These shrubs have simple, green leaves with a waxy appearance due to their thick cuticles. Unlike other Illicium species, their leaves give off a sweet, yet spicy aroma when crushed. They have small, red flowers with reduced petals, along with small bracts and stamens of the same red coloring. Their thick sepals, petals, stamens, and carpels are poorly structured: they vary in numbers and intergrade. Seeds and fruit are undescribed.

== Uses and cultivation ==
Due to their limited range and rarity, not much is known about its uses or cultivation. However, it is known that the people of Cuba have used other species of Illicium as treatments for various ailments such as gastric/intestinal problems, menstrual cramps, rheumatism, and nasal congestion. It is possible the shrub may contain similar medicinal properties as other Illicium.

== Etymology ==
Illicium is derived from Latin and means 'seductive'. The name is in reference to the plant's fragrance.
