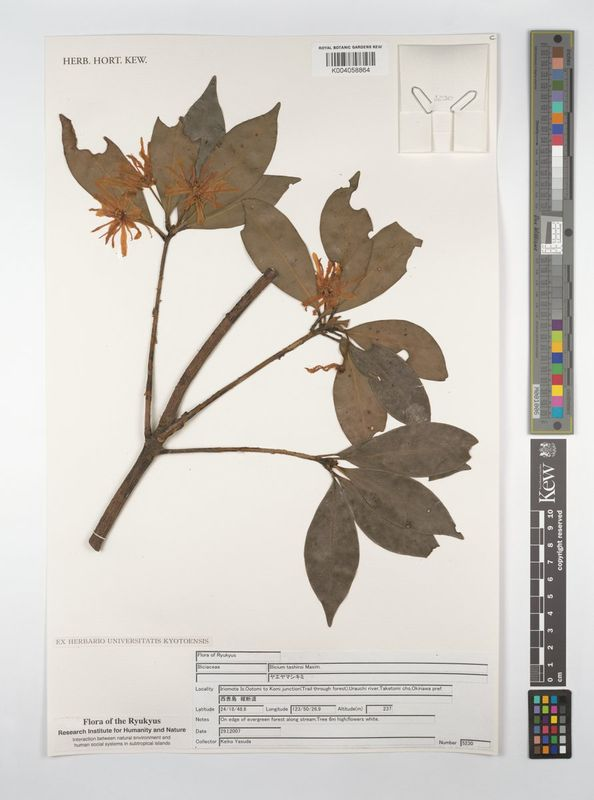

Scientific classification
- Kingdom: Plantae
- Clade: Embryophytes
- Clade: Tracheophytes
- Clade: Angiosperms
- Order: Austrobaileyales
- Family: Schisandraceae
- Genus: Illicium
- Species: I. tashiroi

Binomial name
- Illicium tashiroi Maxim.

Synonyms
- Illicium anisatum var. tashiroi (Maxim.) E.Walker; Illicium randaiense Hayata

= Illicium tashiroi =

Species of flowering plant

Illicium tashiroi is a species of flowering plant in the family Schisandraceae. It is a shrub or tree with leathery leaves, and ten to twenty white tepals. The species is native to Japan and Taiwan, and was described in 1888.

== Taxonomy ==
The species was described by Karl Maximovich in 1888.

== Distribution ==
Illicium tashiroi is native to the subtropical biome of Japan (Ryukyu Islands) and Taiwan. It grows in forests, at elevations of up to 2,000 metres (6,600 ft).

== Description ==
Illicium tashiroi is a shrub or small tree. The leaves are in clusters of three to five. The leaf stems are 0.8–1.7 centimetres (0.31–0.67 in) long. The leaves are thinly leathery, lanceolate-elliptic, 6–11 centimetres (2.4–4.3 in) long, and 2–4.2 centimetres (0.79–1.65 in) long.

The flower stems are 1–2 centimetres (0.39–0.79 in) long. The flowers have ten to twenty white tepals. The tepals are narrowly oblong, 11–15 millimetres (0.43–0.59 in) long, and 1.5–4 millimetres (0.059–0.157 in) wide. The flowers have seventeen to twenty stamens, and twelve to thirteen carpels. The plant flowers from April to August.

The fruit stems are 1.2–3.5 centimetres (0.47–1.38 in) long. The seeds are 7–7.5 millimetres (0.28–0.30 in) long, and 4.5–5 millimetres (0.18–0.20 in) wide.

== Ecology ==
Illicium tashiroi is eaten by moths and butterflies, including Caloptilia illicii and Papilio protenor.

== Nomenclature ==
In Chinese, the species is known as 東亞八角 (dong ya ba jiao), or 巒大八角 (luan da ba jiao). In Jananese, it is known as ヤエヤマシキミ (yaeyamashikimi).
