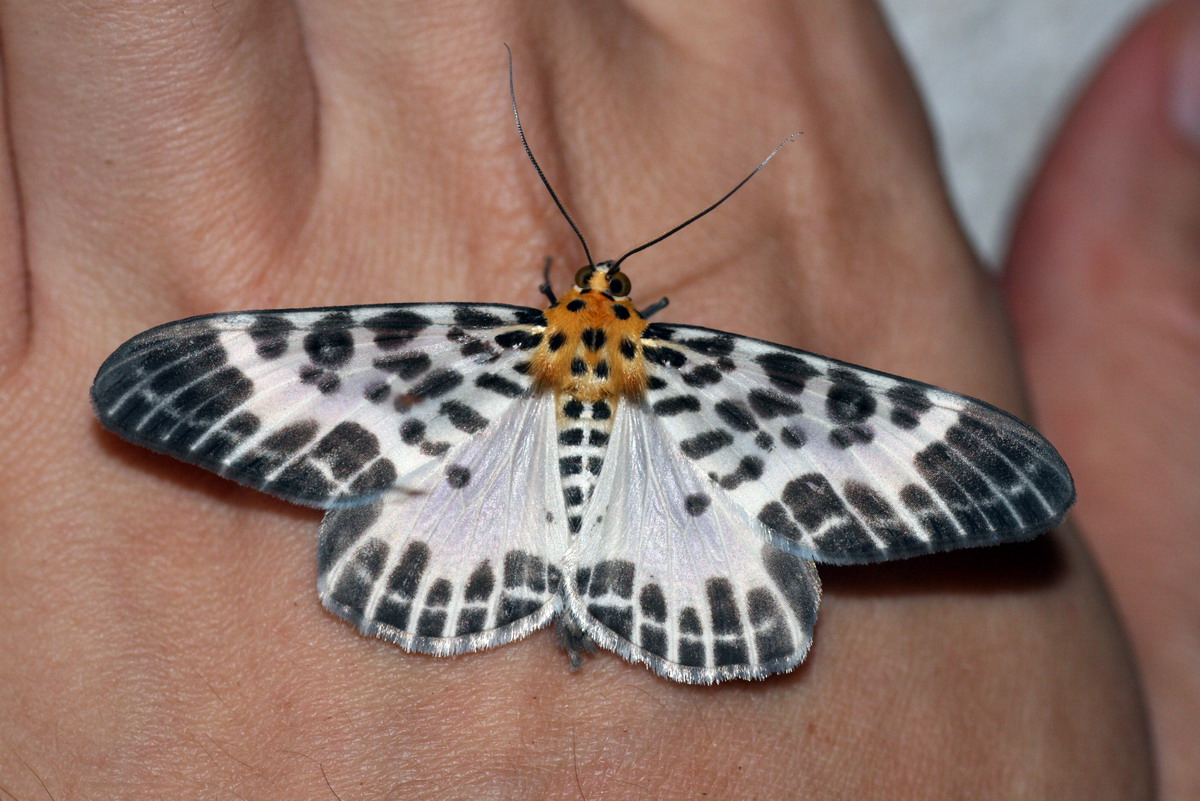
- Pogonopygia nigralbata. Malaya, Fraser's Hill

Scientific classification
- Domain: Eukaryota
- Kingdom: Animalia
- Phylum: Arthropoda
- Class: Insecta
- Order: Lepidoptera
- Family: Geometridae
- Tribe: Boarmiini
- Genus: Pogonopygia; Warren, 1894

= Pogonopygia =

Genus of moths

Pogonopygia is a genus of moths in the family Geometridae.

== Species ==
- Pogonopygia nigralbata Warren, 1894
- Pogonopygia pavida (Bastelberger, 1911)
