= The Shuimang Herb =

- Short story by Pu Songling
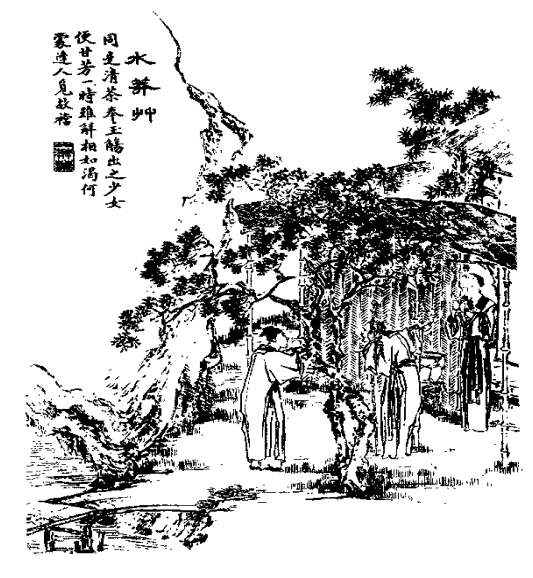
- Illustration from Xiangzhu liaozhai zhiyi tuyong (Liaozhai Zhiyi with commentary and illustrations; 1886)
- Original title: 水莽草 (Shuimang Cao)
- Translator: Herbert Giles
- Country: China
- Language: Chinese
- Genres: Zhiguai; Chuanqi; Short story

Publication
- Published in: Strange Tales from a Chinese Studio
- Media type: Print (Book)
- Publication date: 1740
- Published in English: 1880

Chronology
Old Master Zhang (张老相公)	Creating Livestock (造畜)

"The Shuimang Herb" (Chinese: 水莽草; pinyin: Shuǐmǎng Cǎo), also translated as "The Shuimang Plant", is a short story by Pu Songling first published in Strange Tales from a Chinese Studio.

== Plot ==
Anybody who inadvertently consumes the flowers of the poisonous shuimang (Note: Identified by both Giles and Sondergard as Illicium anisatum.) plant is turned into a shuimang ghost who cannot reincarnate until another victim of shuimang poisoning takes their place; shuimang ghosts are especially prevalent in Hunan. Zhu (祝), a scholar, is offered tea by an old woman while on his way to visiting a peer; he declines the foul-smelling drink but is offered a better cup of tea by Sanniang (三娘), a young attendant to the old woman. Pocketing one of Sanniang's rings and promising to return, Zhu suspects that something is amiss upon reaching home. After experiencing chest pains, he confides in a friend, who deduces that Sanniang belongs to the Kou (寇) family and had died of shuimang poisoning herself. Zhu succumbs to the poison and his widowed wife remarries shortly after, leaving their one-month-old son in Zhu's mother's care.

One day, Zhu (now a ghost) visits his mother and announces that he had located Kou Sanniang's reincarnated self and "went thither and dragged her spirit back". Having exchanged wedding vows in the underworld, Zhu and his new wife take up residence at Zhu's former home. Upon learning of the incredible news, Kou's parents rush to Zhu's place. She tells them that the old woman, Ni (倪), had also died of shuimang poisoning but was "too ugly to entrap people herself", and has since been reborn. Thereafter, Kou maintains perfunctory relations with her parents, while Zhu does not even visit his in-laws.

Another villager dies of shuimang poisoning but is brought back to life after Zhu prevents another shuimang ghost, Li Jiu (李九), from letting the recently deceased's soul take his place. From then on, Zhu similarly intervenes in other shuimang poisoning cases. However, after ten years, his mother dies and Zhu stops assisting others; two years later, Zhu's son, E (鹗), marries the granddaughter of the reborn Kou Sanniang's father. Having been appointed by God as "Keeper of the Dragons" (四渎牧龙君), Zhu disappears with his wife; Zhu's son obtains his stepmother's ashes and buries them next to his father's.

== Publication history ==
Originally titled "Shuimang Cao" (水莽草), the story was first published in Pu Songling's anthology of close to five hundred short stories, Strange Tales from a Chinese Studio or Liaozhai Zhiyi. It was translated into English as "The Shui-mang Plant" by British sinologist Herbert Giles in Strange Stories from a Chinese Studio (1880), which is widely regarded as the first substantial translation of Liaozhai. The story was also included in the first volume of Strange Tales from Liaozhai by Sidney Sondergard published in 2008.
