= Illicium ekmanii =

Conservation status
- Vulnerable (IUCN 3.1)

Scientific classification
- Kingdom: Plantae
- Clade: Tracheophytes
- Clade: Angiosperms
- Order: Austrobaileyales
- Family: Schisandraceae
- Genus: Illicium
- Species: I. ekmanii

Binomial name
- Illicium ekmanii A.C.Sm.

Subspecies
- Illicium ekmanii subsp. domingense Imkhan.; Illicium ekmanii subsp. ekmanii; Illicium ekmanii subsp. selleanum Imkhan.

Species of flowering plant

Illicium ekmanii, commonly known as Hispaniolan star anise, is a species of flowering plant in the family Schisandraceae. It is a shrub or tree native to Hispaniola. The species was described in 1947, and is listed as Vulnerable by the IUCN.

== Taxonomy ==
The species was described by Albert Charles Smith in 1947.

Three subspecies are recognised:

- Illicium ekmanii subsp. domingense Imkhan. - native to the Dominican Republic
- Illicium ekmanii subsp. ekmanii - Native to the Dominican Republic and Haiti
- Illicium ekmanii subsp. selleanum Imkhan. - native to Haiti

The type locality is in the Massif du Nord, Haiti.

== Distribution ==
Illicium ekmanii is native to the wet tropical biome of Hispaniola (the Dominican Republic and Haiti). Its estimated extent of occurrence is 28,386 square kilometres (10,960 sq mi). The species grows in moist montane forests, at elevations of 500–1,600 metres (1,600–5,200 ft).

== Description ==
Illicium ekmanii is a shrub or tree that grows up to 7 metres (23 ft) high.

== Uses ==
Illicium ekmanii is used in medicine, and as a source of charcoal. The fruits are harvested for use as a star anise substitute.

== Conservation ==
In 2022, the IUCN assessed Illicium ekmanii as Vulnerable. It is threatened by fire, agriculture, and overharvesting. The species occurs in protected areas of the Dominican Republic, and has been planted as part of a reforestation programme.

== Nomenclature ==
In English, Illicium ekmanii is commonly known as "Hispaniolan Star Anise". In Spanish, it is known as Canelilla, Anís de Estrella de Monte, or Anís de Estrella Cimarrón.
