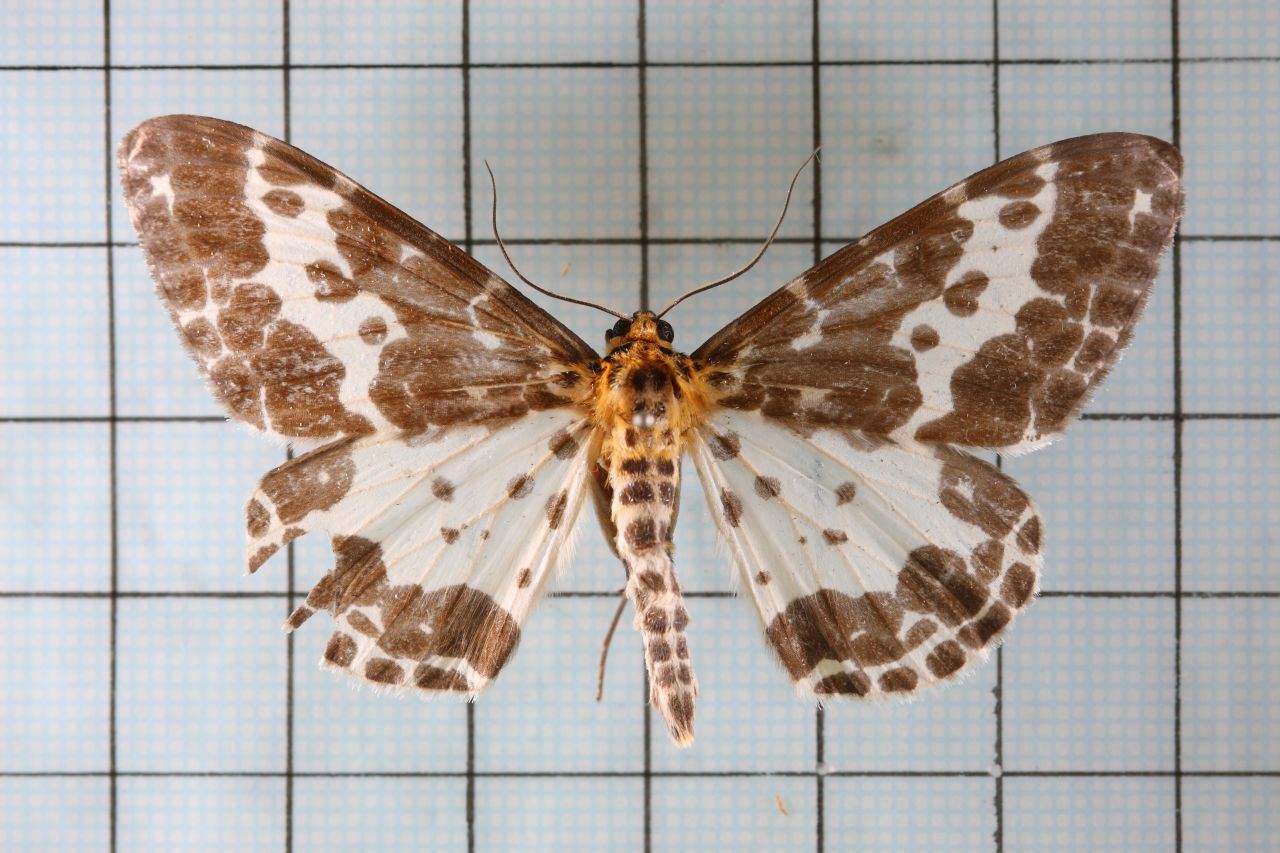
- Pogonopygia pavida pavida

Scientific classification
- Domain: Eukaryota
- Kingdom: Animalia
- Phylum: Arthropoda
- Class: Insecta
- Order: Lepidoptera
- Family: Geometridae
- Genus: Pogonopygia
- Species: P. pavida

Binomial name
- Pogonopygia pavida (Bastelberger, 1911)

Synonyms
- Dilophodes pavida Bastelberger, 1911; Pogonopygia pavidus; Dilophodes baria Prout, 1932; Dilophodes contaminata Inoue, 1971; Dilophodes xanthura Prout, 1928; Pogonopygia xanthura

= Pogonopygia pavida =

Species of moth

Pogonopygia pavida is a species of moth of the family Geometridae. It is found in the Himalaya, Taiwan, Japan, Indonesia and Peninsular Malaysia.

== Subspecies ==
- Pogonopygia pavida pavida
- Pogonopygia pavida baria Prout, 1932 (Borneo)
- Pogonopygia pavida contaminata Inoue, 1971 (Japan)
- Pogonopygia pavida xanthura Prout, 1928 (Sumatra, Peninsular Malaysia)
