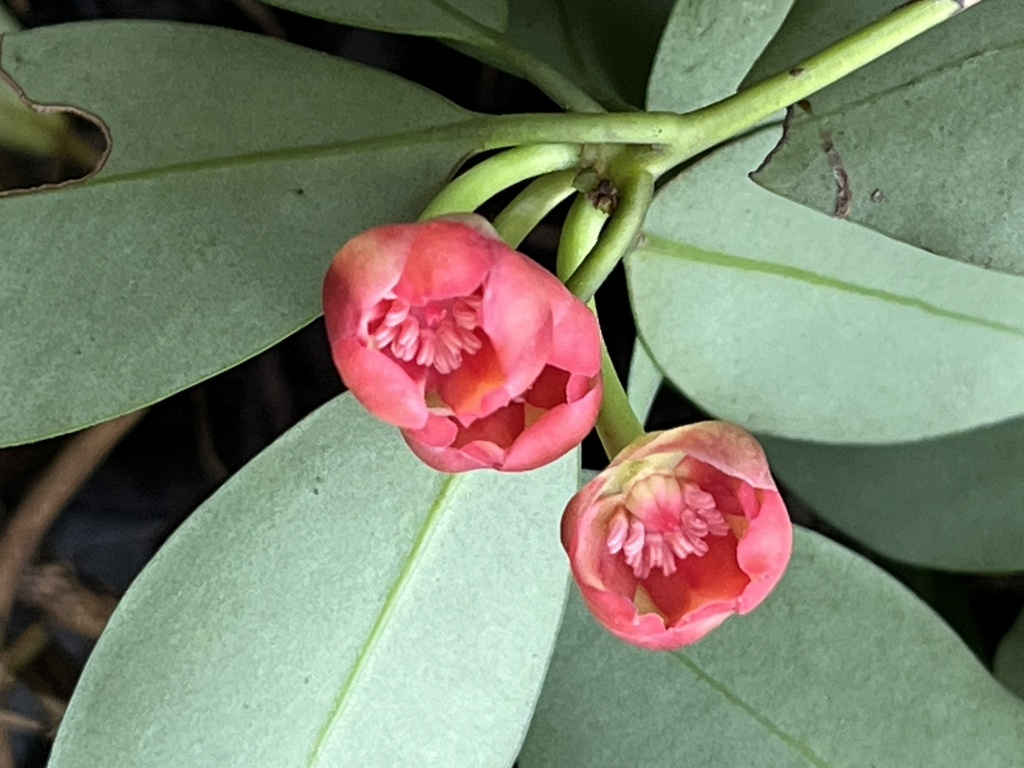

Scientific classification
- Kingdom: Plantae
- Clade: Embryophytes
- Clade: Tracheophytes
- Clade: Spermatophytes
- Clade: Angiosperms
- Order: Austrobaileyales
- Family: Schisandraceae
- Genus: Illicium
- Species: I. arborescens

Binomial name
- Illicium arborescens Hayata

= Illicium arborescens =

Species of flowering plant

Illicium arborescens is a species of flowering plant in the family Schisandraceae. It is endemic to Taiwan.

Illicium arborescens is a tree with red flowers. It produces poisonous fruit.

The species was described by Bunzō Hayata in 1912.

== Distribution ==
Illicium arborescens is native to the subtropical biome of Taiwan. It grows in broad leaved forests, at elevations of 300–2,500 metres (980–8,200 ft).

== Description ==
Illicium arborescens is a tree that grows up to 15 metres (49 ft) tall. The leaves are narrowly oblong or elliptic, and leathery in texture. The leaves grow in clusters of three to five, on 0.8–1.7 centimetres (0.31–0.67 in) stalks. The leaves are 6–12 centimetres (2.4–4.7 in) long, and 2–4.5 centimetres (0.79–1.77 in) wide.

The flowers are red to pale red, and grow on 0.5–2.2 centimetres (0.20–0.87 in) stalks. The flowers have fourteen to twenty-one tepals. The plant flowers in January and April.

The fruits are poisonous. They grow on 1.5–3 centimetres (0.59–1.18 in) stems. The plant fruits in October.

== Names ==
In Chinese, Illicium arborescens is known as 臺灣八角, tai wan ba jiao, or 紅花八角, hong hua ba jiao. In Japanese, it is known as アカバナシキミ, akabanashikimi.
