= Anisatin =

- Stereo skeletal formula of anisatin

Names
- Preferred IUPAC name (1R,4S,5R,6S,6aR,7R,9R,9aS)-1,5,6a,7-Tetrahydroxy-5,9-dimethylhexahydrospiro[[4,9a]methanocyclopenta[d]oxocine-6,3′-oxetane]-2,2′(1H)-dione

Identifiers
CAS Number	5230-87-5
3D model (JSmol)	Interactive image
ChEBI	CHEBI:182764
ChEMBL	ChEMBL517697
ChemSpider	103015
ECHA InfoCard	100.208.646
KEGG	C09294
MeSH	Anisatin
PubChem CID	12306850
UNII	W9K8802FZL
CompTox Dashboard (EPA)	DTXSID6058396
- InChI: InChI=1S/C15H20O8/c1-6-3-7(16)15(21)13(6)4-8(23-10(18)9(13)17)12(2,20)14(15)5-22-11(14)19/h6-9,16-17,20-21H,3-5H2,1-2H3/t6-,7-,8-,9+,12+,13+,14+,15-/m1/s1 Key: GEVWHIDSUOMVRI-QWNPAUMXSA-N
- SMILES: O=C1OC[C@]14[C@@]2(O)[C@H](O)C[C@H]([C@]23C[C@@H](OC(=O)[C@@H]3O)[C@@]4(O)C)C

Properties
Chemical formula	C_{15}H_{20}O_{8}
Molar mass	328.317 g·mol^{−1}
log P	−1.894
Acidity (pK_{a})	12.005
Basicity (pK_{b})	1.992
- Except where otherwise noted, data are given for materials in their standard state (at 25 °C [77 °F], 100 kPa). verify (what is ?) Infobox references

Anisatin is an extremely toxic, insecticidally active component of the shikimi plant. The lethal dose is 1 mg/kg (i.p.) in mice. Symptoms begin to appear about 1–6 hours after ingestion, beginning with gastrointestinal ailments, such as diarrhea, vomiting, and stomach pain, followed by nervous system excitation, seizures, loss of consciousness, and respiratory paralysis, which is the ultimate cause of death.

== Role in the GABA system ==
The GABA system is an important site of action by a variety of chemicals, including alcohols, heavy metals, and insecticides. A study conducted on frog spinal cords and rat brains indicated that anisatin was a strong non-competitive GABA antagonist. Anisatin was shown to suppress GABA-induced signals, but when anisatin was added without GABA, there was no change in the signal. Anisatin was also found to share the same binding site as picrotoxinin, and did not cause additional suppression of GABA-induced signals in the presence of high concentrations of picrotoxinin.

Anisatin poisoning has been shown to cause epilepsy, hallucinations, nausea, and convulsions. Diazepam has been studied as an anti-convulsive on the GABA system, and has been shown to be an effective treatment for anisatin-induced convulsions.

== Synthesis ==
A total synthesis of (-)-anisatin was reported in 1990.
