= Illicium cubense =

Scientific classification
- Kingdom: Plantae
- Clade: Embryophytes
- Clade: Tracheophytes
- Clade: Spermatophytes
- Clade: Angiosperms
- Order: Austrobaileyales
- Family: Schisandraceae
- Genus: Illicium
- Species: I. cubense

Binomial name
- Illicium cubense A.C.Sm.

Subspecies
- Illicium cubense subsp. bissei; Illicium cubense subsp. cubense; Illicium cubense subsp. guantanamense

Species of flowering plant

Illicium cubense is a species of flowering plant in the family Schisandraceae. It is a shrub native to Cuba. The species was described in 1947, and has three subspecies.

== Taxonomy ==
Illicium cubense was described by Albert Charles Smith in 1947.

There are three recognised subspecies:

- Illicium cubense subsp. bissei Imkhan. (native to Eastern Cuba)
- Illicium cubense subsp. cubense (native to Cuba)
- Illicium cubense subsp. guantanamense Imkhan. (native to Eastern Cuba)

== Distribution ==
Illicium cubense is native to the wet tropical biome of Cuba. It grows in thickets, pine woods, and the edges of woods. It is present at elevations of 450–1,500 metres (1,480–4,920 ft).

== Description ==
Illicium cubense is a small shrub, 2–5 metres (6.6–16.4 ft) high. The leaves are leathery to sub-leathery, and oblong-elliptical to ovate-elliptical. The leaves are 4–11 centimetres (1.6–4.3 in) long, and 1.5–4.5 centimetres (0.59–1.77 in) wide. The leaf stalks are 7–20 millimetres (0.28–0.79 in) long.
