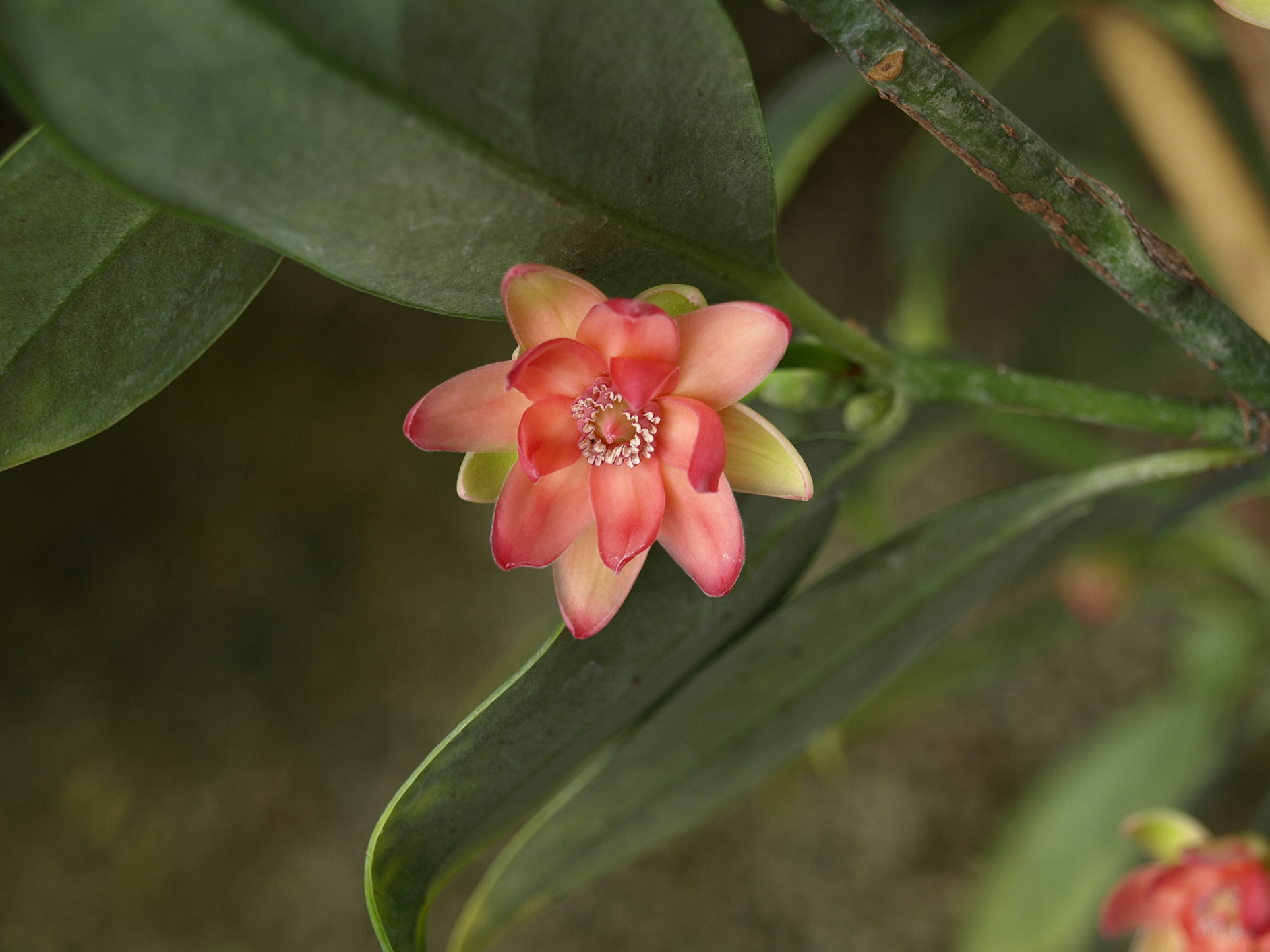

Conservation status
- Least Concern (IUCN 3.1)

Scientific classification
- Kingdom: Plantae
- Clade: Embryophytes
- Clade: Tracheophytes
- Clade: Spermatophytes
- Clade: Angiosperms
- Order: Austrobaileyales
- Family: Schisandraceae
- Genus: Illicium
- Species: I. henryi

Binomial name
- Illicium henryi Diels

Synonyms
- Illicium pseudosimonsii Q.Lin; Illicium silvestri Pavol.

= Illicium henryi =

Chinese anise tree

Illicium henryi, also known by the common names Henry anise tree and Chinese anise tree is a species in the genus Illicium in the family Schisandraceae.

== Description ==
Illicium henryi is a broad-leaved evergreen shrub or small tree, reaching 1.8-7m in height at maturity. Its leaves are entire, and are a glossy dark green above and slightly paler beneath. When crushed, the leaves are highly scented.

== Range ==
Illicium henryi is native to China, specifically the north-central, south-central, and southeast or west.

== Etymology ==
Illicium is derived from Latin and means 'seductive'. The name is in reference to the plant's fragrance.

Henryi is named for Augustine Henry (1857-1930), an Irish botanist who went on plant hunting expeditions to China, and who co-authored Trees of Great Britain and Ireland together with Henry John Elwes.
