= Dihydropicrotoxinin =

Identifiers
CAS Number	17617-46-8
3D model (JSmol)	Interactive image
ChemSpider	108864
PubChem CID	122052
- InChI: InChI=1S/C15H18O6/c1-5(2)7-8-11(16)19-9(7)10-13(3)14(8,18)4-6-15(13,21-6)12(17)20-10/h5-10,18H,4H2,1-3H3/t6?,7?,8-,9?,10-,13-,14-,15?/m1/s1 Key: SJSFJVFGSPJGET-KJINDDCRSA-N
- SMILES: CC(C)C1[C@@H]2C(=O)OC1[C@@H]3[C@@]4([C@]2(CC5C4(O5)C(=O)O3)O)C

Properties
Chemical formula	C_{15}H_{18}O_{6}
Molar mass	294.303 g·mol^{−1}
- Except where otherwise noted, data are given for materials in their standard state (at 25 °C [77 °F], 100 kPa). Infobox references

Dihydropicrotoxinin is the saturated derivative of picrotoxinin. Its radiolabeled derivative, [^{3}H]dihydropicrotoxinin, is used in scientific research to study the GABA receptors.

== See also ==
- Picrotoxin
