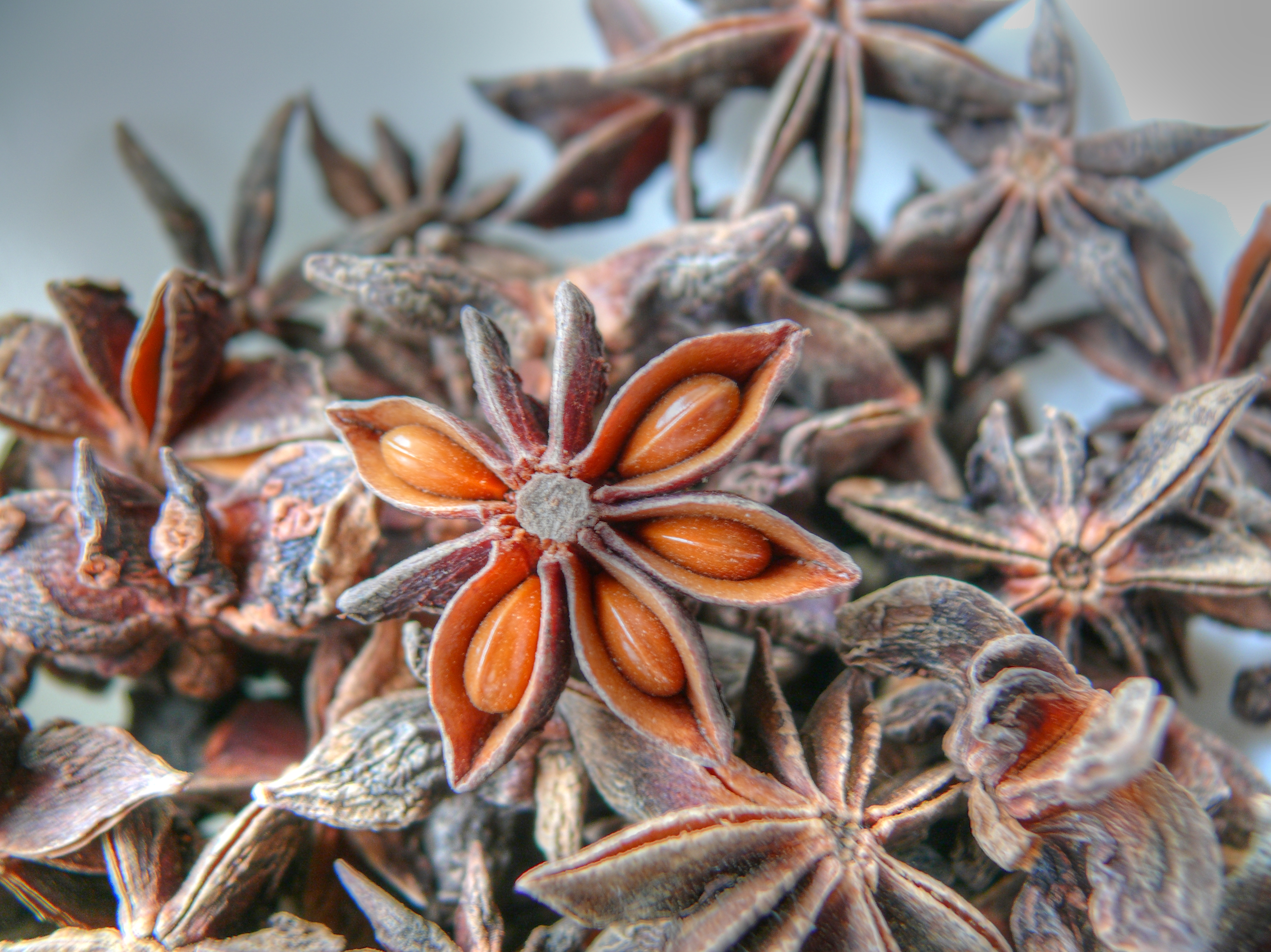
- Fruits of Illicium verum

Scientific classification
- Kingdom: Plantae
- Clade: Embryophytes
- Clade: Tracheophytes
- Clade: Spermatophytes
- Clade: Angiosperms
- Order: Austrobaileyales
- Family: Schisandraceae
- Genus: Illicium; L.

Type species
- Illicium anisatum

Synonyms
- Badianifera L. ex Kuntze; Cymbostemon Spach

= Illicium =

Genus of flowering plants

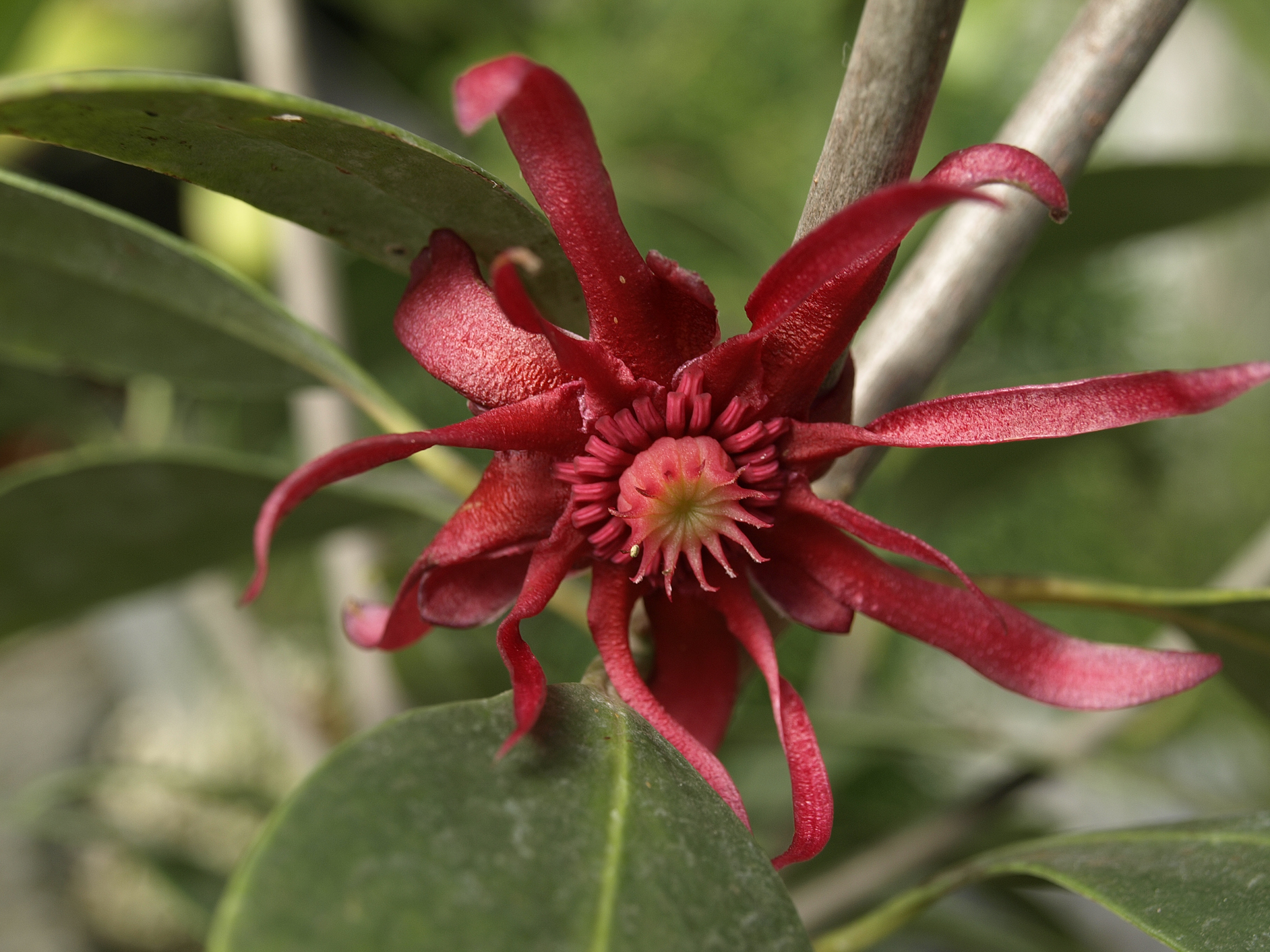
Illicium floridanum

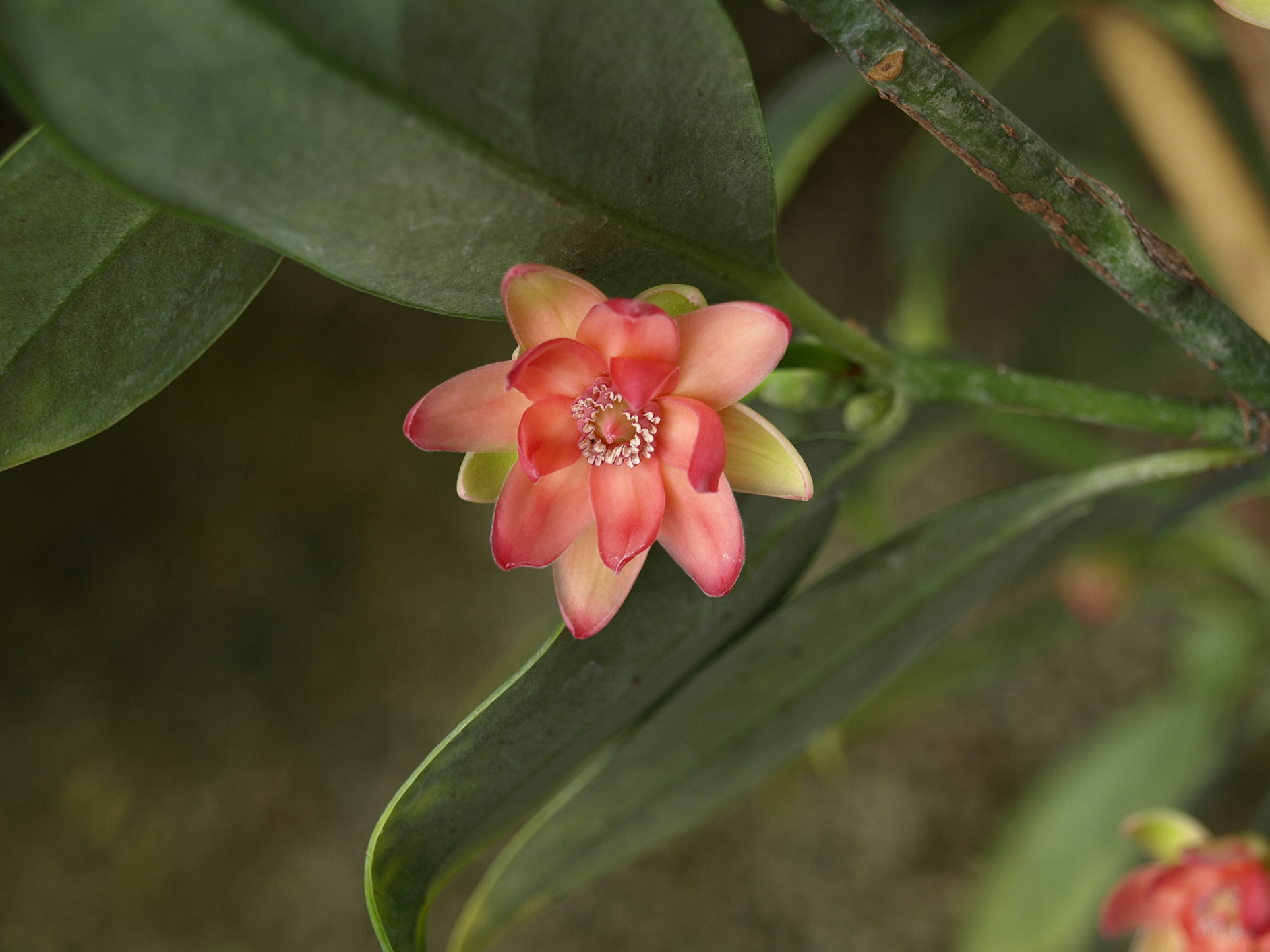
Illicium henryi

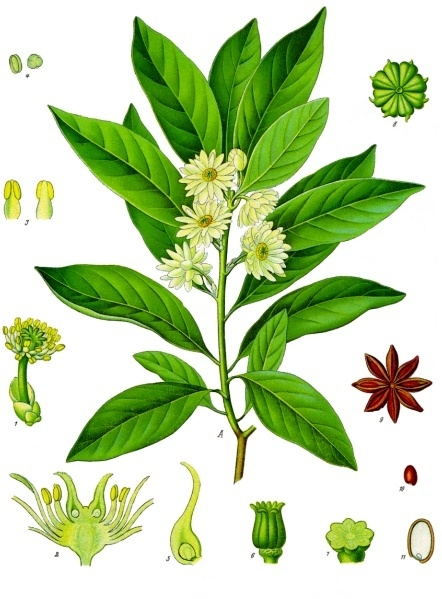
Illicium anisatum in Köhler's Medicinal Plants

Illicium is a genus of flowering plants treated as part of the family Schisandraceae, or alternately as the sole genus of the Illiciaceae. It has a disjunct distribution, with most species native to subtropical and tropical areas of East and Southeast Asia and several in parts of North America, including the southeastern United States, Mexico, and the Caribbean. General common names include star anise and anisetree. The genus name comes from the Latin illicere ("to allure").

== Description ==
Illicium species are evergreen shrubs and small trees. The leaves are alternately arranged and borne on petioles. The blades are glandular and fragrant. The flowers are solitary. They have few to many tepals in two or three rows, the inner ones like petals and the outer ones often smaller and more like bracts. A few to many stamens and pistils are at the center. The fruit is an aggregate of follicles arranged in a star-shaped whorl. One seed is in each follicle, released when the follicle dehisces. The seed has a thick, oily endosperm.

== Biology ==
These are plants of moist understory, adapted to shady habitat, and some species are so sensitive to light that too much sunlight causes them significant stress, manifesting in chlorosis and necrosis of the leaves.

== Uses ==
Several species are cultivated as ornamental plants for their flowers, foliage, and fragrance, leading to the development of several cultivars. Many taxa can only be grown in low-light situations.

The essential oils of several species are used as flavorings and carminatives; however, the oils of I. anisatum and I. floridanum are toxic. I. verum, the common star anise, is used to flavor food and liquor. Its fruit is a traditional Chinese medicine called bājiǎo huíxiāng (八角茴香), which is used to treat abdominal pain and vomiting.

== Diversity ==
Illicium is a notably difficult genus to taxonomically classify. Many of the currently recognized species lack distinguishing characters, and treatments tend to list many synonyms. Additionally, herbarium material is often poorly preserved or scarce.

As of May 2025, Plants of the World Online accepted these species:

- Illicium angustisepalum A.C.Sm. – South China
- Illicium anisatum L. – Japan, South Korea, Taiwan
- Illicium arborescens Hayata – Taiwan
- Illicium brevistylum A.C.Sm. – China (Guangdong, Guangxi, Hunan, Yunnan)
- Illicium burmanicum E.H.Wilson – China (Yunnan), Myanmar
- Illicium cubense A.C.Sm. – Cuba
- Illicium difengpi B.N.Chang – China (Guangxi)
- Illicium dunnianum Tutcher – South China
- Illicium ekmanii A.C.Sm. – Hispaniola (Dominican Republic, Haiti)
- Illicium floridanum J.Ellis – United States (Florida, Georgia, Alabama, Mississippi, Louisiana), Mexico
- Illicium gansuense Z.F.Bai & Xue L.Chen – North China
- Illicium griffithii Hook.f. & Thomson – China (Tibet), Bhutan, India (Arunachal Pradesh)
- Illicium guajaibonense (Imkhan.) Judd & J.R.Abbott – Cuba
- Illicium henryi Diels – South China
- Illicium hottense A.Guerrero, Judd & A.B.Morris – Hispaniola (Haiti)
- Illicium jiadifengpi B.N.Chang – South China
- Illicium lanceolatum A.C.Sm. – South China
- Illicium leiophyllum A.C.Sm. – Hong Kong
- Illicium macranthum A.C.Sm. – China (Yunnan)
- Illicium majus Hook.f. & Thomson – South China, Vietnam, Myanmar
- Illicium merrillianum A.C.Sm. – China (Yunnan), Myanmar
- Illicium micranthum Dunn – China (Yunnan)
- Illicium modestum A.C.Sm. – China (Yunnan)
- Illicium pachyphyllum A.C.Sm. – China (Guangxi)
- Illicium parviflorum Michx. ex Vent. – yellow anise – United States (Florida)
- Illicium parvifolium Merr. – China, Vietnam
- Illicium petelotii A.C.Sm. – China (Yunnan), Vietnam
- Illicium philippinense Merr. – Philippines, Taiwan
- Illicium rangelense (Imkhan.) García-Beltrán – West Cuba
- Illicium ridleyanum A.C.Sm. – Peninsular Malaysia
- Illicium simonsii Maxim. – South China, India (Assam), Myanmar
- Illicium stapfii Merr. – Thailand, Peninsular Malaysia, Borneo
- Illicium sumatranum A.C.Sm. – Indonesia (Sumatra)
- Illicium tashiroi Maxim. – Taiwan, Japan (Ryukyu Islands)
- Illicium tenuifolium (Ridl.) A.C.Sm. – Vietnam
- Illicium ternstroemioides A.C.Sm. – China (Fujian, Hainan)
- Illicium tsaii A.C.Sm. – China (Yunnan)
- Illicium verum Hook.f. – star anise, Chinese star-anise, staranise tree – China (Guangxi)
- Illicium viridiflorum Yahara, A.Nagah. & Tagane – Vietnam
- Illicium wardii A.C.Sm. – China (Yunnan), Myanmar
