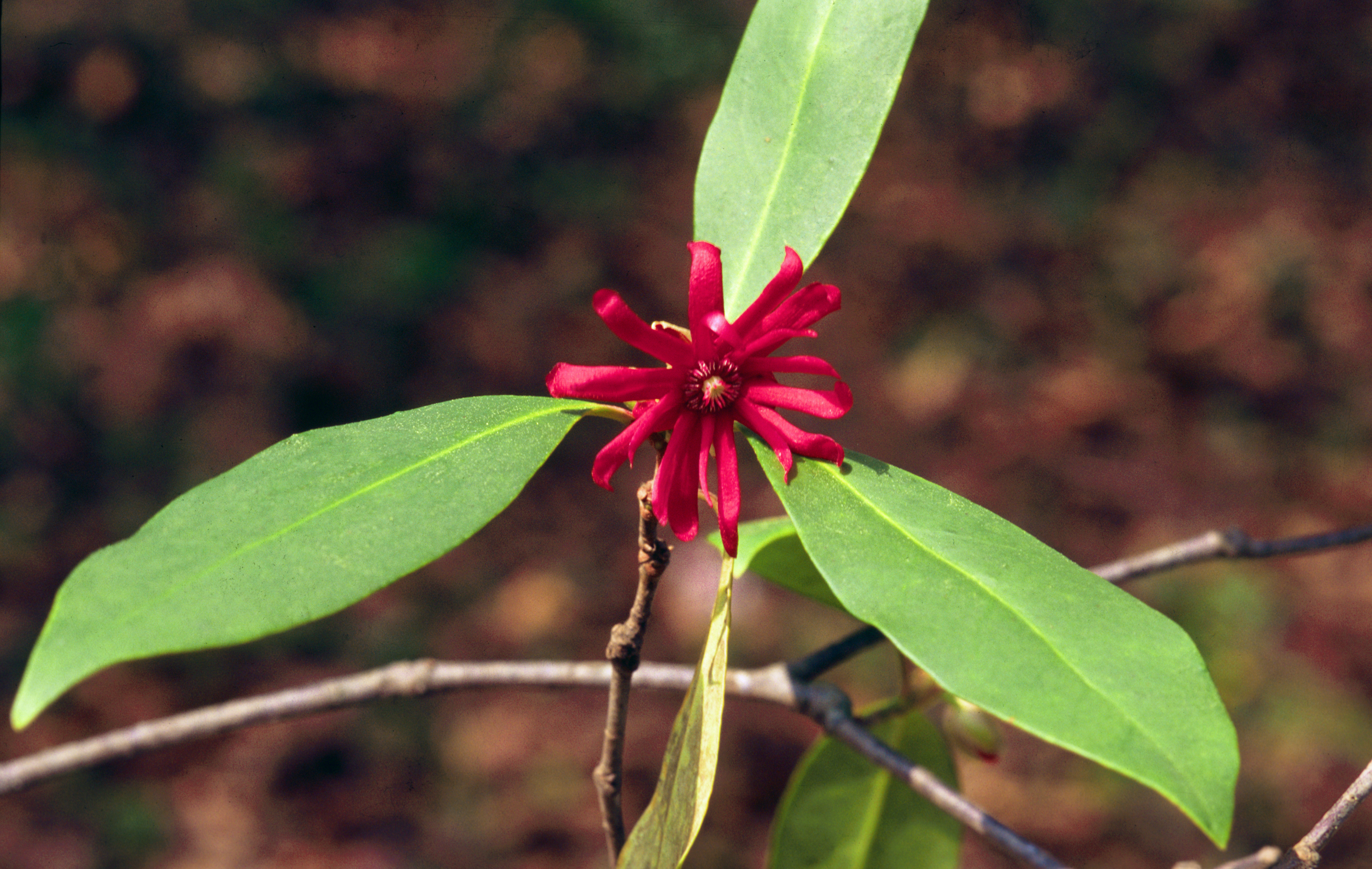

Conservation status
- Least Concern (IUCN 3.1)

Scientific classification
- Kingdom: Plantae
- Clade: Tracheophytes
- Clade: Angiosperms
- Order: Austrobaileyales
- Family: Schisandraceae
- Genus: Illicium
- Species: I. floridanum

Binomial name
- Illicium floridanum J.Ellis
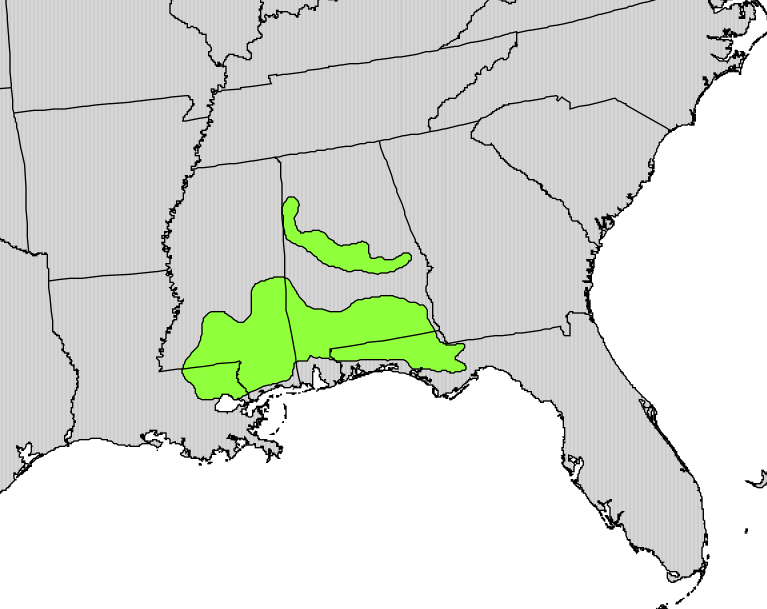
- Natural range

Synonyms
- Badianifera floridana (J.Ellis) Kuntze; Illicium mexicanum A.C.Sm.; Illicium reticulatum Raf.

= Illicium floridanum =

Species of plant

Illicium floridanum (also known as purple anise, Florida anise, stink-bush, or star-anise) is an evergreen shrub native to the Gulf Coast area of the Southern United States, from Florida to Louisiana. It is also native to Mexico.

== Description ==
The Florida anise tree has large evergreen lance shaped leaves that are lustrous and dark green. When crushed the leaf has a sweet odor, described as being "anise-like". The leaf of this plant has a parallel main vein. Within the leaf of this shrub, a flower also grows. The flower has 20 to 30 maroon-colored petals. The petals are typically 2 inches (5 cm) in diameter. The flower is attractive, and it is often overlooked within the lush shiny foliage, but has a fish-like odor. If the flower is ripe, the seed explodes out of the star-shaped fruit. This plant has a variety that can be produced in cultivation through selective breeding. Depending on the breeding, white flowers can be observed.

== Taxonomy ==
The Illicium floridanum plant was first discovered in 1765 by the servant of a William Clifton of West Florida. It was first observed growing in a swamp near Pensacola. In 1766, King George III's botanist, John Bartram, found the Illicium flordianum plant on the bank of the St. Johns River in East Florida. He made a drawing of the plant and described its petals, leaves, and type of tree it was.

== Distribution and habitat ==
Illicium floridanum is a perennial plant and in the United States it is native to northern Florida and Georgia, as well as along the coastal plain toward Louisiana. The species is assessed as endangered in Georgia. A population is known from northeastern Mexico, from Tamaulipas to Puebla. Illicium floridanum can be seen growing in wetlands, but can also be found in non-wetland areas. It grows in partial to fully shaded areas. However, it can survive in sunny areas, as long as it is being watered well. The soil for this plant should be moist, mulched and watered, especially during periods of dryness.

== Uses ==
Illicium floridanum is toxic for ingestion, and should not be used an alternative to a culinary spice. However, there is a similar species, the Chinese plant known as Illicium verum, which is used as a spice, and the oil of which is used in medicine and to flavor alcoholic beverages.

== Etymology ==
Illicium is derived from Latin and means 'seductive'. The name is in reference to the plant's fragrance. Floridanum means 'from Florida'.

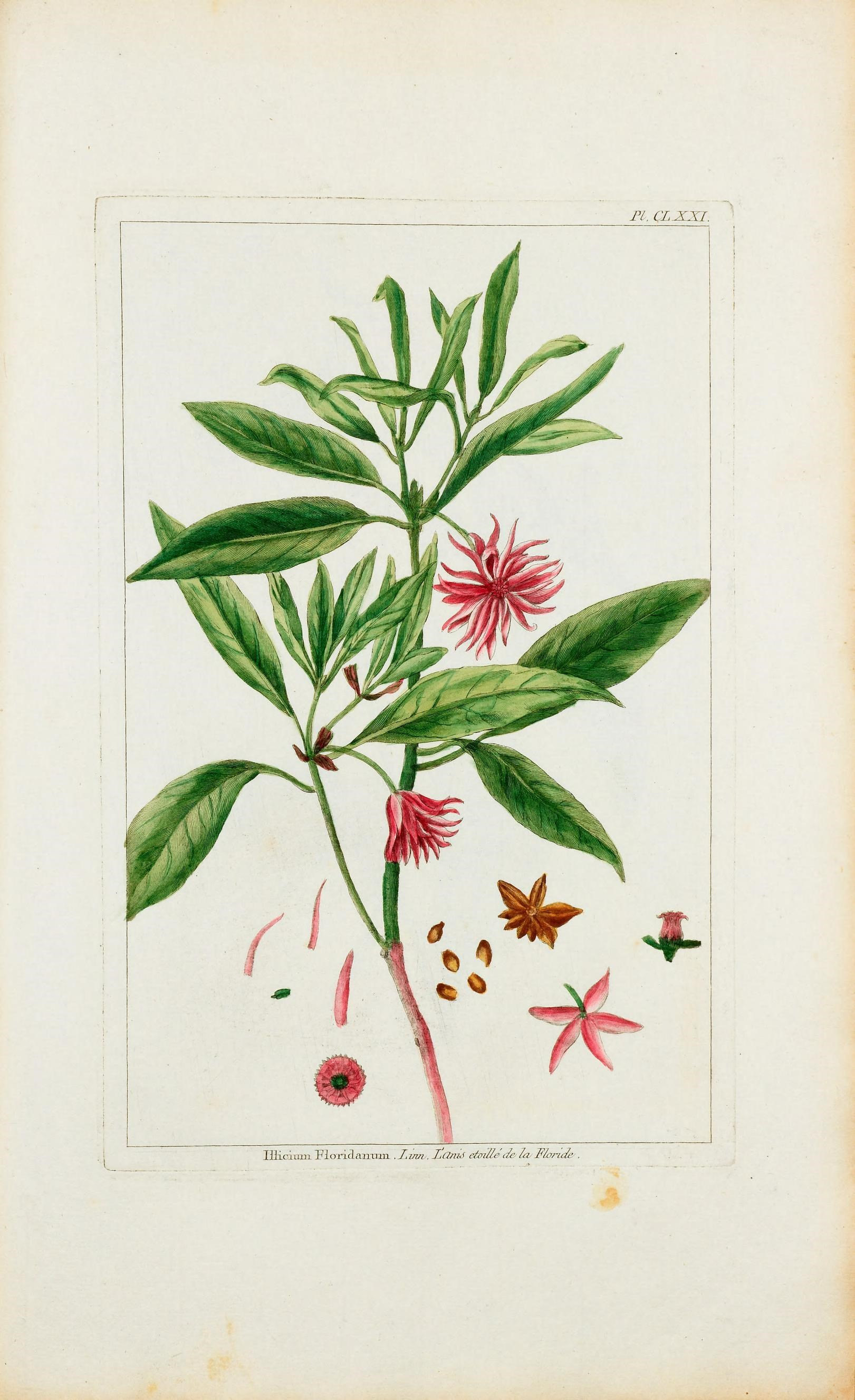
Illustration of plant.

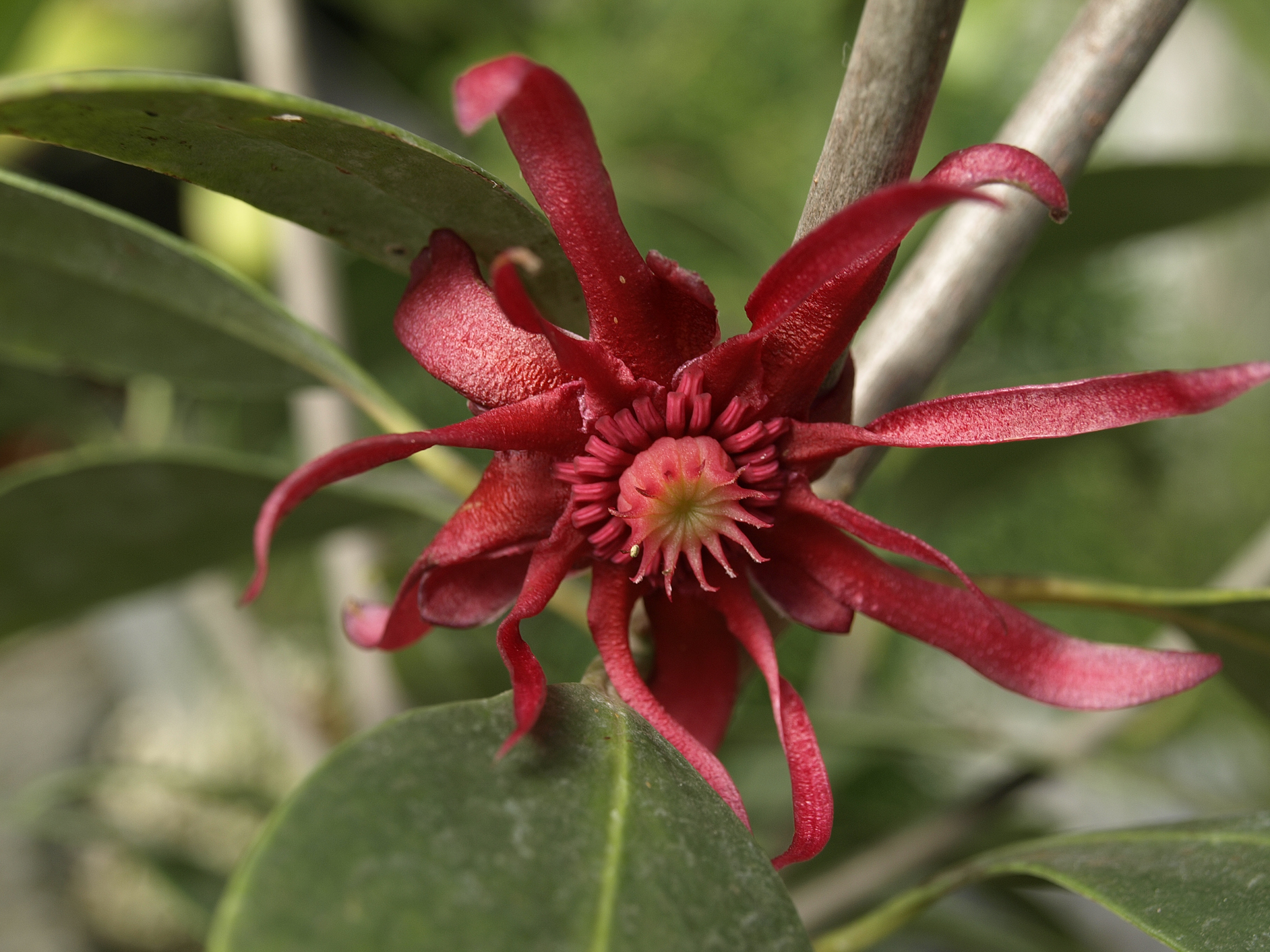
Maroon petals on the Illicium floridanum.
