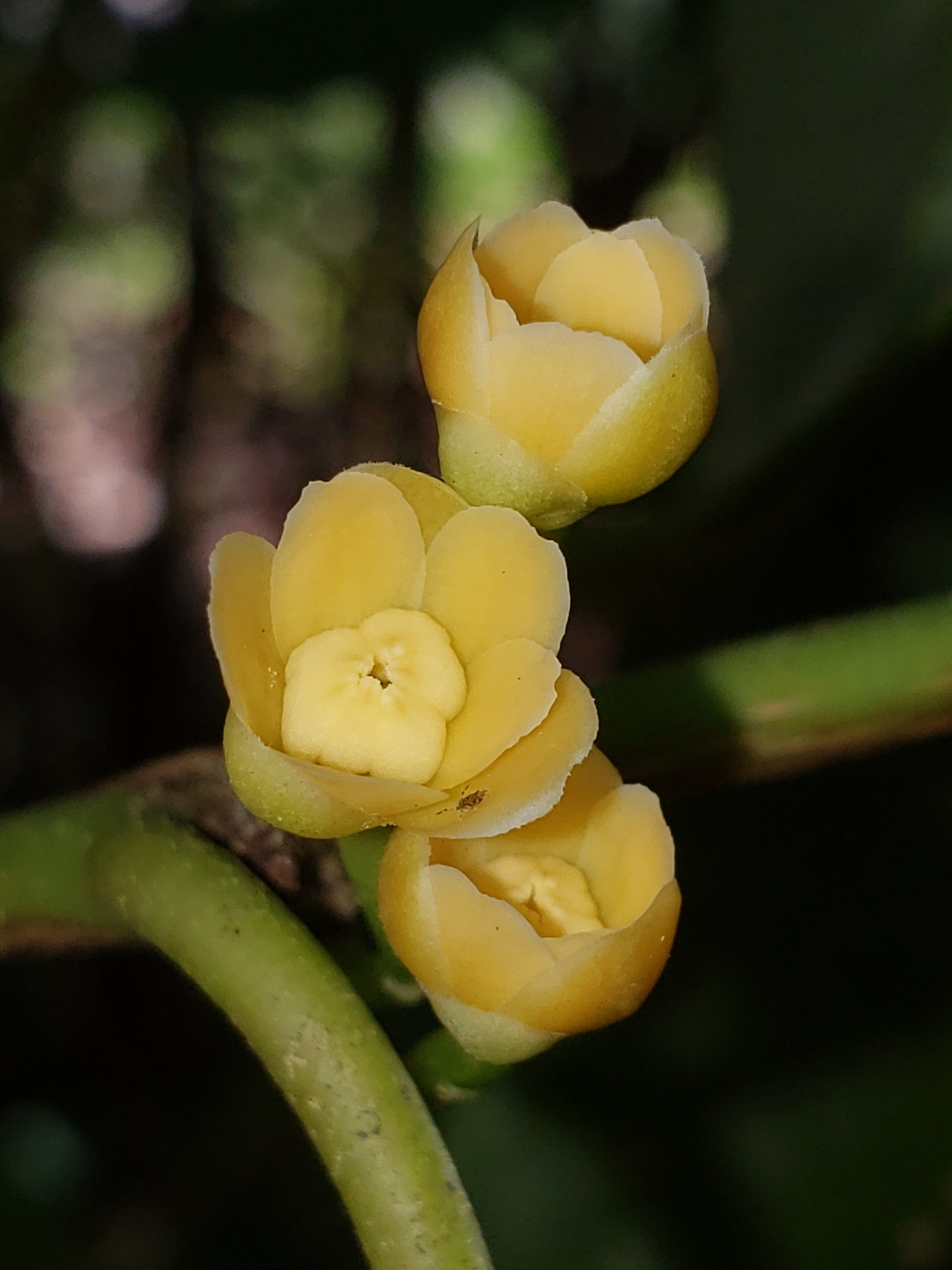

Conservation status
- Imperiled (NatureServe)

Scientific classification
- Kingdom: Plantae
- Clade: Tracheophytes
- Clade: Angiosperms
- Order: Austrobaileyales
- Family: Schisandraceae
- Genus: Illicium
- Species: I. parviflorum

Binomial name
- Illicium parviflorum Michx.
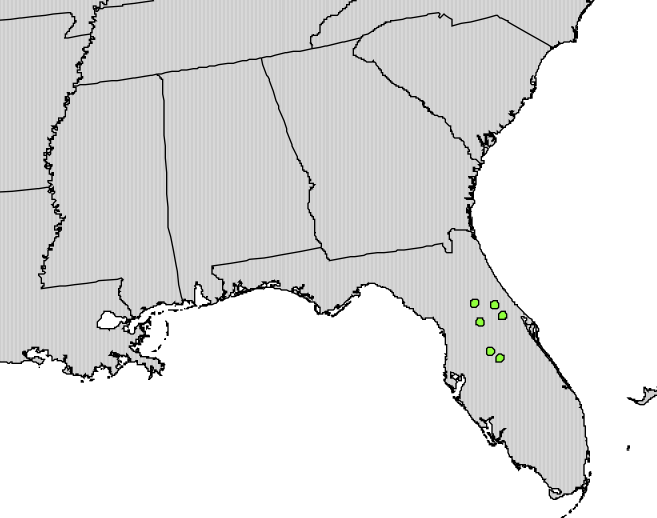
- Natural range

= Illicium parviflorum =

Species of flowering plant

Illicium parviflorum, commonly known as yellow anisetree, yellow-anise, swamp star-anise, and small anise tree, is a species of flowering plant in the family Schisandraceae, or alternately, the Illiciaceae. It is native to Florida in the United States. It historically occurred in Georgia as well, but it has been extirpated from the state.

== Description ==
This is an evergreen shrub or tree growing up to 7 meters tall, sometimes with several trunks. The wood, foliage, and flowers are fragrant, with a scent similar to licorice. The alternately arranged leaves have leathery, oval blades up to 15 centimeters long. They are dark, shiny green on top with paler, glandular undersides. The flowers are roughly a centimeter wide and have 11 to 14 yellow-green tepals and several stamens and pistils. The fruit is a star-shaped aggregate of up to 13 follicles, each of which releases one shiny brown seed upon dehiscence. It is hardy in the US in zones 6-9.

== Ecology ==
The plant grows in moist soils in several types of habitat, such as floodplains and hammocks, and near swamps and waterways. Associates include Atlantic white cypress (Chamaecyparis thyoides), Florida hobblebush (Agarista populifolia), common palmetto (Sabal palmetto), bush palmetto (Sabal minor), needle palm (Rhapidophyllum hystrix), sweetbay (Magnolia virginiana), and swampbay (Persea palustris).

== Conservation ==
The plant is currently known from fewer than 20 occurrences in Central Florida, within Polk, Marion, Lake, Volusia, and Seminole Counties. It is mainly threatened by the loss of its habitat, particularly changes in local hydrology, but it is also sometimes wild-harvested for use in cultivation.

== Uses ==
This plant is cultivated as a fragrant and attractive if not very showy ornamental, and can be pruned and shaped to form hedges and windbreaks. It can become very dense as roots continue to send up new shoots, and branches can root where they come in contact with the soil. It is considered easy to grow and does not have many pest problems. It can sprawl up to 4.5 meters wide if not maintained. If the lower branches are removed it can be sculpted into a tree shape. It is commercially available and inexpensive.

The plant is poisonous and cannot be used as a spice like its congener, star anise.

== Etymology ==
Illicium is derived from Latin and means 'seductive'. The name is in reference to the plant's fragrance.

Parviflorus means 'small-flowered'.
