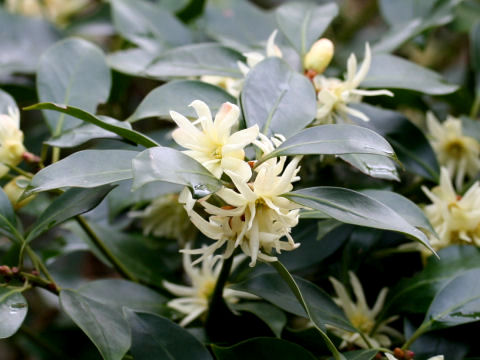

Scientific classification
- Kingdom: Plantae
- Clade: Tracheophytes
- Clade: Angiosperms
- Order: Austrobaileyales
- Family: Schisandraceae
- Genus: Illicium
- Species: I. anisatum

Binomial name
- Illicium anisatum L.

Synonyms
- Illicium japonicum Sieb.; Illicium religiosum Sieb. & Zucc.

= Illicium anisatum =

Shikimi Japanese star anise

Species of plant

Illicium anisatum, with common names Japanese star anise, aniseed tree, and sacred anise tree, known in Japanese as shikimi (樒; シキミ), is an evergreen shrub or small tree closely related to the Chinese star anise (Illicium verum). Since it is highly toxic, the fruit is not edible; instead, the dried and powdered leaves are burned as incense in Japan. Its branches and evergreen leaves are considered highly sacred by Japanese Buddhists due to insects' aversion to them and their ability to remain fresh after pruning.

The sacred anise tree is native to parts of east Asia including Japan, South Korea and Taiwan. It normally grows between 6–15 feet (1.8–4.6 m) with leaves that are simple, arranged alternately and oval in shape and about 1 to 3 in (2.5 to 7.6 cm)in length. Its cream or white colored flowers have numerous petals and are clustered around the leaf axils. Its fruit is a dry follicle similar to the Chinese star anise, but toxic, smaller and with a weaker odour, reputed to be more similar to the aroma of cardamom than to that of anise.

Due to its poisonous nature, its seeds have been used as a fish poison as well as a natural agricultural pesticide and to repel animals from digging the grounds of Japanese graveyards. Its seeds have also been used medicinally to treat toothache and dermatitis topically, since it is unsuitable for internal use.

== Toxicity and accidental use in food products ==
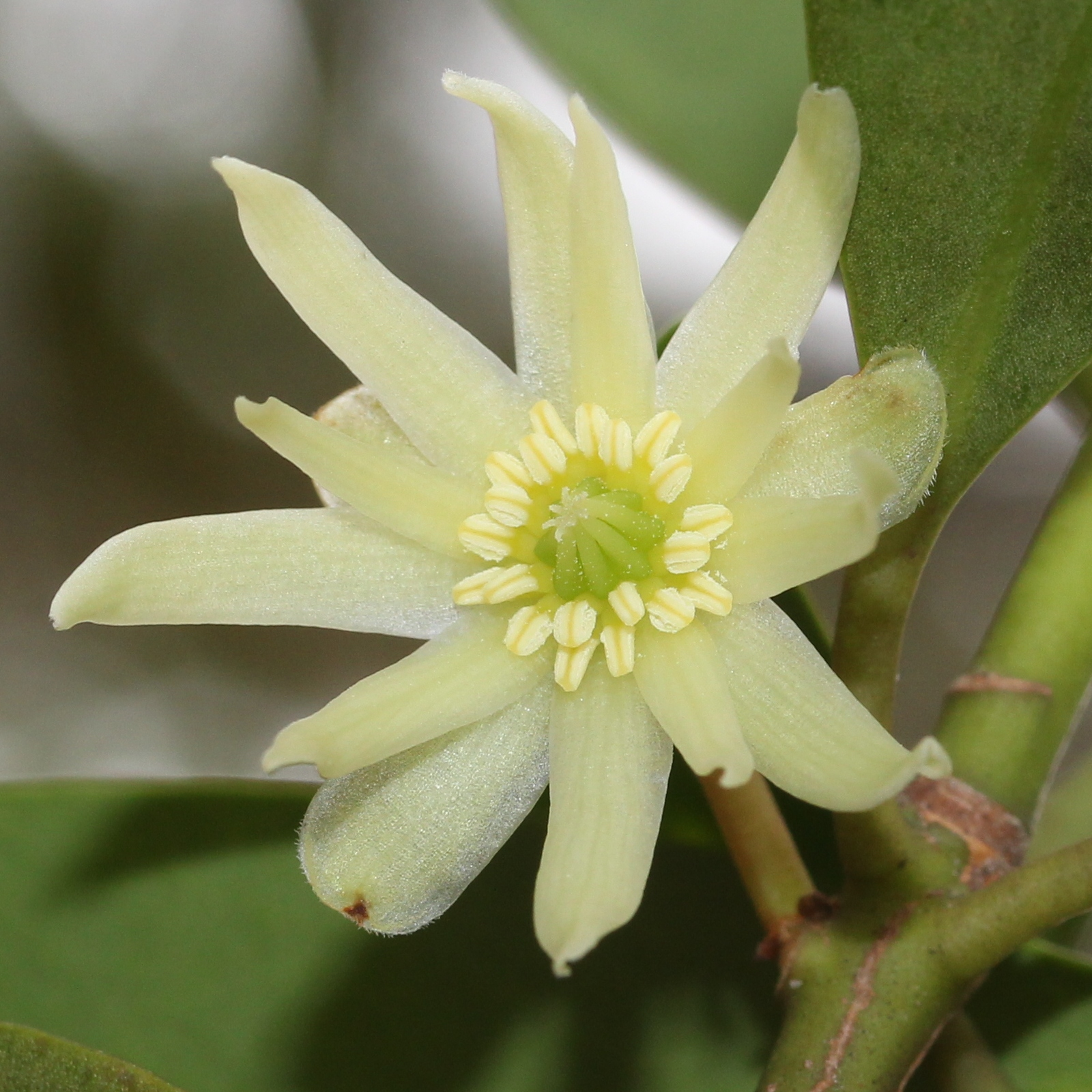
The flowers of the Shikimi plant.

Japanese star anise contains anisatin, shikimin, and shikimitoxin, which cause severe inflammation of the kidneys, urinary tract, and digestive organs. Other compounds present in toxic species of Illicium are safrole and eugenol, which are not present in the edible Chinese star anise and are used to identify its toxicity. Shikimic acid, a substance also present in Japanese star anise, is so-called after the plant's Japanese name.

Due to its morphological similarities, it is impossible to distinguish Chinese and Japanese star anise in dried or processed form by their appearance only, and can only be unequivocally determined by using botanical microscopy. This process must be done before the plants have been made into tea and dried out.

Cases of product recalls have been reported when products containing star anise were found to be contaminated by Japanese anise. Cases of consumers admitted to hospital with neurological symptoms after ingesting excessive doses of star anise or smaller doses of products contaminated with Japanese anise have also occurred: In Europe, Chinese star anise tea is often used as a stress-relief tea. Cases of illness have been reported in France, Spain, and Switzerland after people were reported consuming Chinese star anise tea contaminated with Japanese star anise. This contamination hospitalized many people with epilepsy, hallucinations, and nausea all as a result of the toxin anisatin, found in the Japanese star anise. In 2001, there was a large outbreak of toxicity in the Netherlands due to accidental contamination of a tea blend containing more than 6 different tea plants with the Japanese star anise.

=== Essential oil components ===
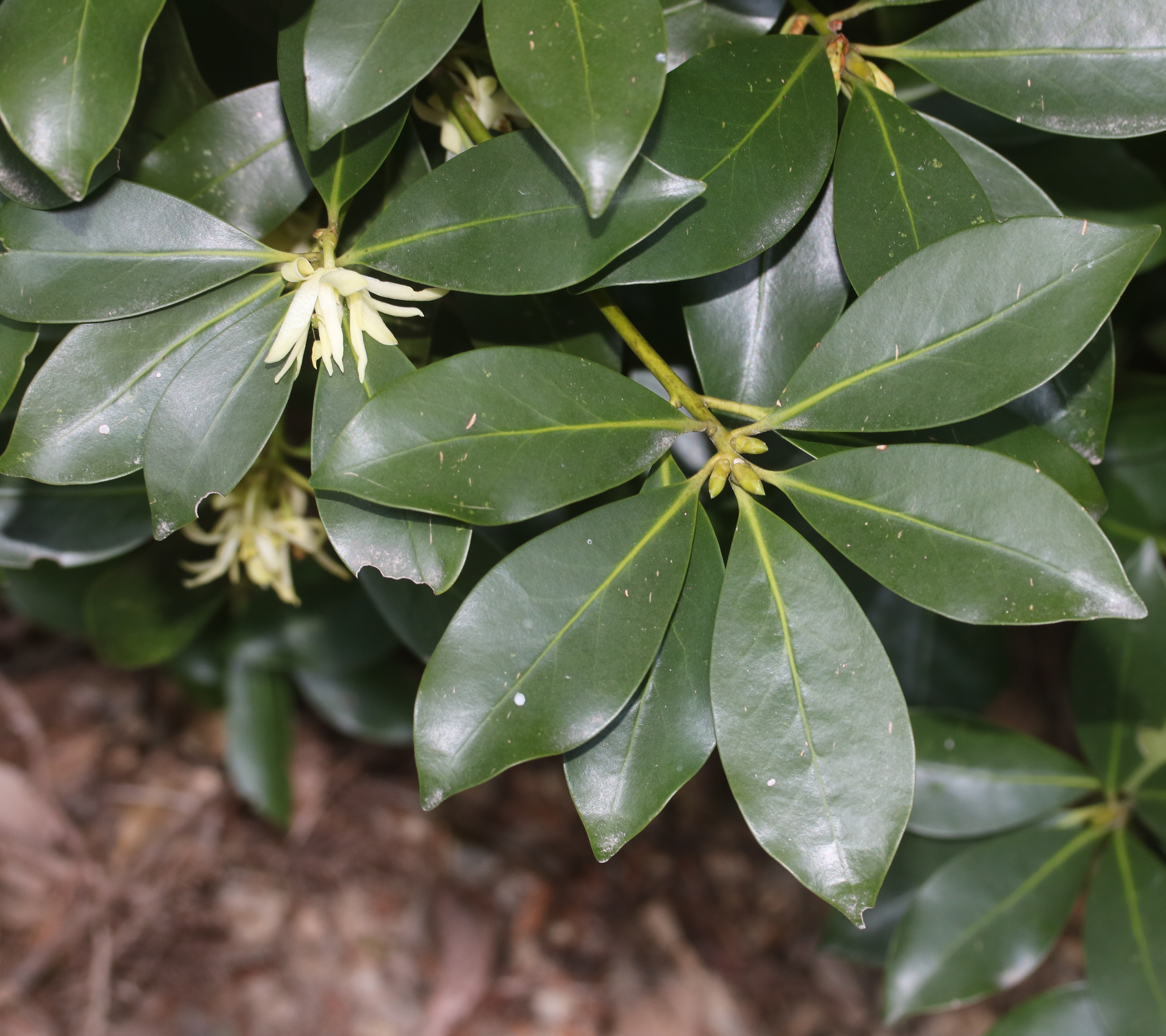
The mature leaves of the Shikimi plant.

The essential oil of air-dried I. anisatum seeds obtained by hydrodistillation was analysed by GC–MS. Fifty-two components were identified in the essential oil, the main component being eucalyptol (21.8%).

== Etymology ==
Illicium is derived from Latin and means 'seductive'. The name is in reference to the plant's fragrance.

Anisatum means 'anise-scented'.

== In literature ==
The 16-century Chinese anthology Strange Stories from a Chinese Studio includes a mythical story titled "The Shuimang Herb" whose titular plant is inspired by Illicium anisatum.

== See also ==
- Illicium floridanum
- Illicium verum
