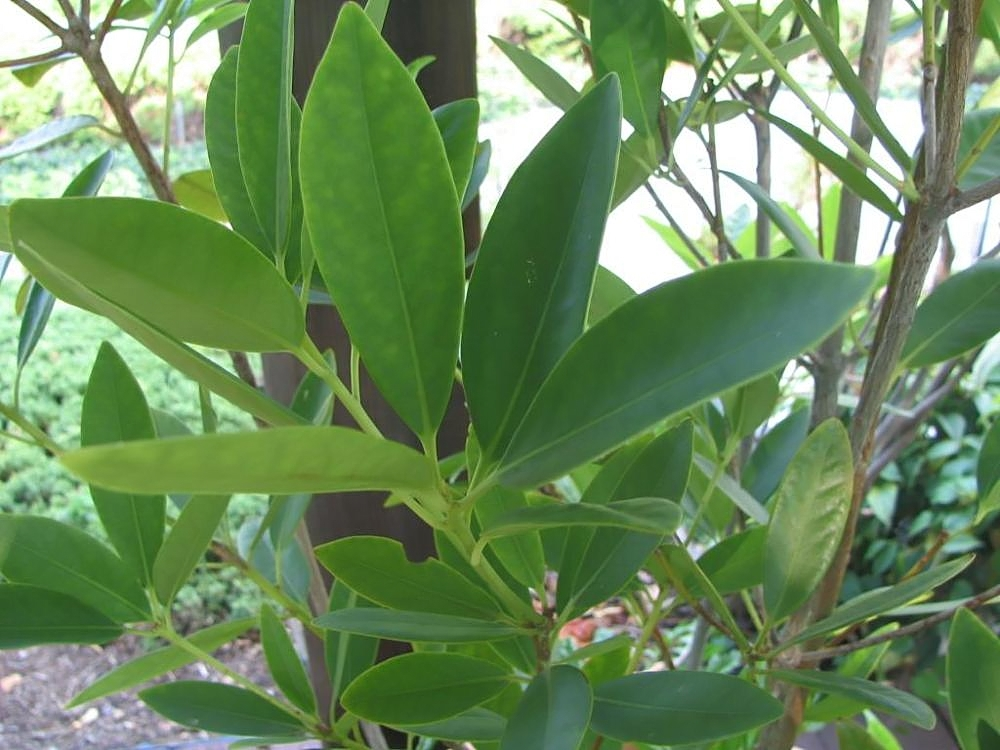
- Illicium verum at the United States National Arboretum
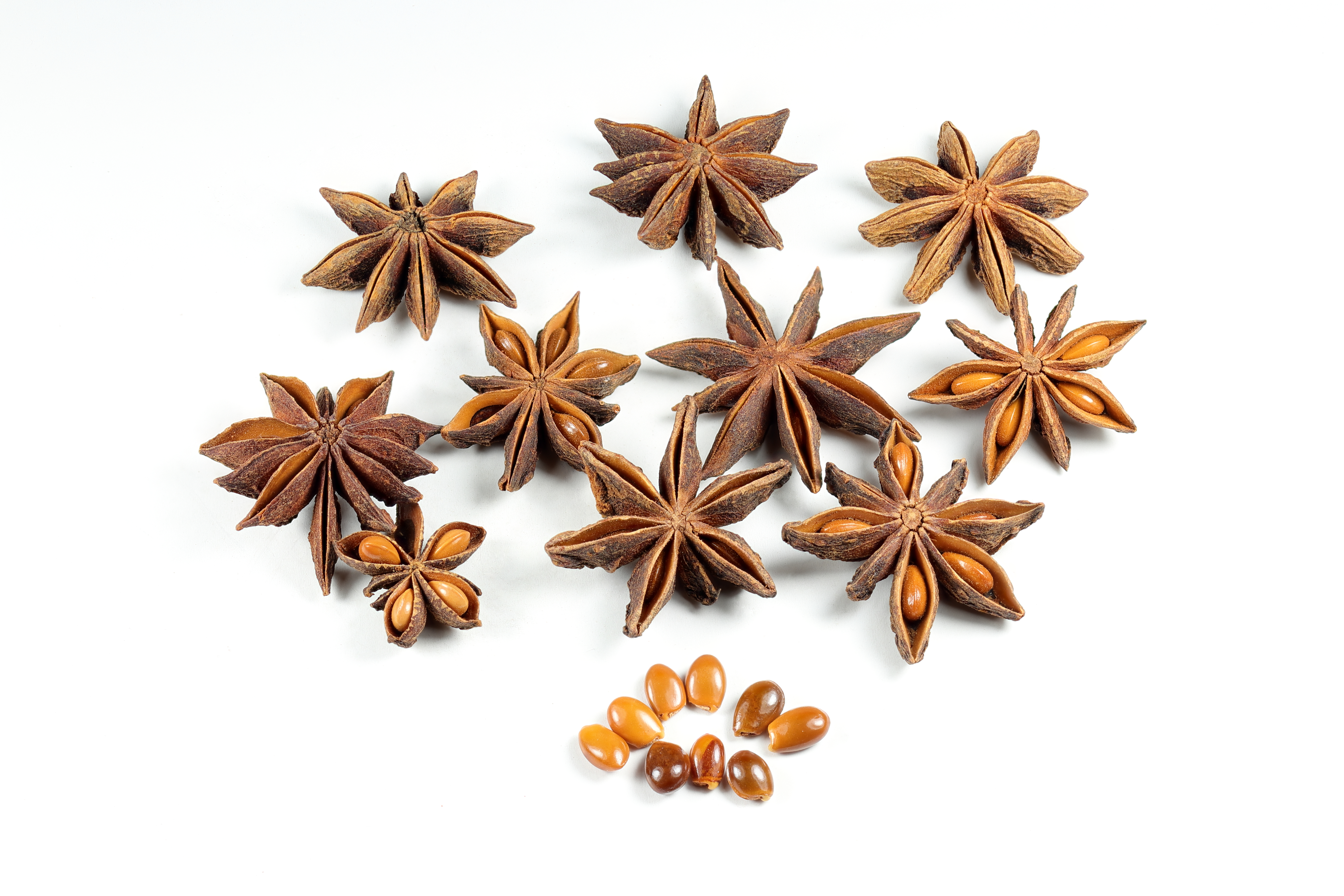
- Star anise fruits and seeds

Scientific classification
- Kingdom: Plantae
- Clade: Tracheophytes
- Clade: Angiosperms
- Order: Austrobaileyales
- Family: Schisandraceae
- Genus: Illicium
- Species: I. verum

Binomial name
- Illicium verum Hook.f.

Synonyms
- Illicium san-ki Perr.

= Illicium verum =

Star anise, an evergreen tree

Illicium verum (star anise or badian, Chinese star anise, star anise seed, star aniseed and star of anise) is a medium-sized evergreen tree native to South China and northeast Vietnam. Its star-shaped pericarp fruits harvested just before ripening are a spice that closely resembles anise in flavor. Its primary production country is China, followed by Vietnam and other Southeast Asian countries. Star anise oil is highly fragrant, used in cooking, perfumery, soaps, toothpastes, mouthwashes, and skin creams. Until 2012, when it switched to using genetically modified E. coli, Roche Pharmaceuticals used up to 90% of the world's annual star anise crop to produce oseltamivir (Tamiflu) via shikimic acid.

== Etymology and nomenclature ==
Star anise
- Chinese: 八角
- Literal meaning: "eight-horns"
Transcriptions
Standard Mandarin
- Hanyu Pinyin: bājiǎo
- IPA: [pá.tɕjàʊ]
Yue: Cantonese
- Yale Romanization: baat-gok
- IPA: [pat̚˧ kɔk̚˧]
Southern Min
- Hokkien POJ: peh-kak

Illicium comes from the Latin illicio meaning "entice" or "seduce".

Verum means "true" or "genuine".

The name "badian" appears to derive, via French badiane, from the apparently descriptive Chinese name for it, 八角, pinyin: bājiǎo, lit. "eight horns". However, a derivation from the Persian بادیان bādiyān, "fennel", exists, with the Oxford English Dictionary indicating that its origin before that is unknown.

== Description ==
Leaves are aromatic, simple and lanceolate, obovate-elliptic or elliptic, size of 5–15 cm × 2–5 cm, coriaceous to thickly coriaceous. The leaves are 5–15 cm × 1.5–5 cm, apex acute, lower side pubescent. Flowers are solitary, bisexual, pink to dark red, axillary or subterminal. The perianth has 7–12 lobes, arranged spirally; 11–20 stamens, arranged spirally, with short, thick filaments; and usually 8 carpels, free, arranged in a single whorl. Flower peduncle size is 1.5–4 cm, tepals number range from seven to twelve, and are broadly elliptic to broadly ovate, anthers size is 1–1.5 mm, pollen grains trisyncolpate.

The fruit is a capsule-like follicetum, star-shaped, reddish-brown, consisting of six to eight follicles arranged in a whorl. Each follicle is boat-shaped, 1–2 cm long, rough and rigid, color reddish-brown, with 1 seed, opening along the ventral edge when ripe. carpels size of 10 mm long, boat-shaped; they are hard and wrinkled, containing one seed. Seeds are brown, compressed ovoid, smooth, shiny and brittle with approximate size of 8–9 mm × 6 mm.

Differences with similar taxa: Illicium anisatum had smaller fruits that does not form a regular star due to the abortion of some carpels. Also fruit follicles are not swollen in the middle and had a more pointed apex. Also usually had more than 8 follicles and the fruit has weaker odour. The seeds in Illicium anisatum are flat or almost spherical.

== Use ==
=== Culinary use ===
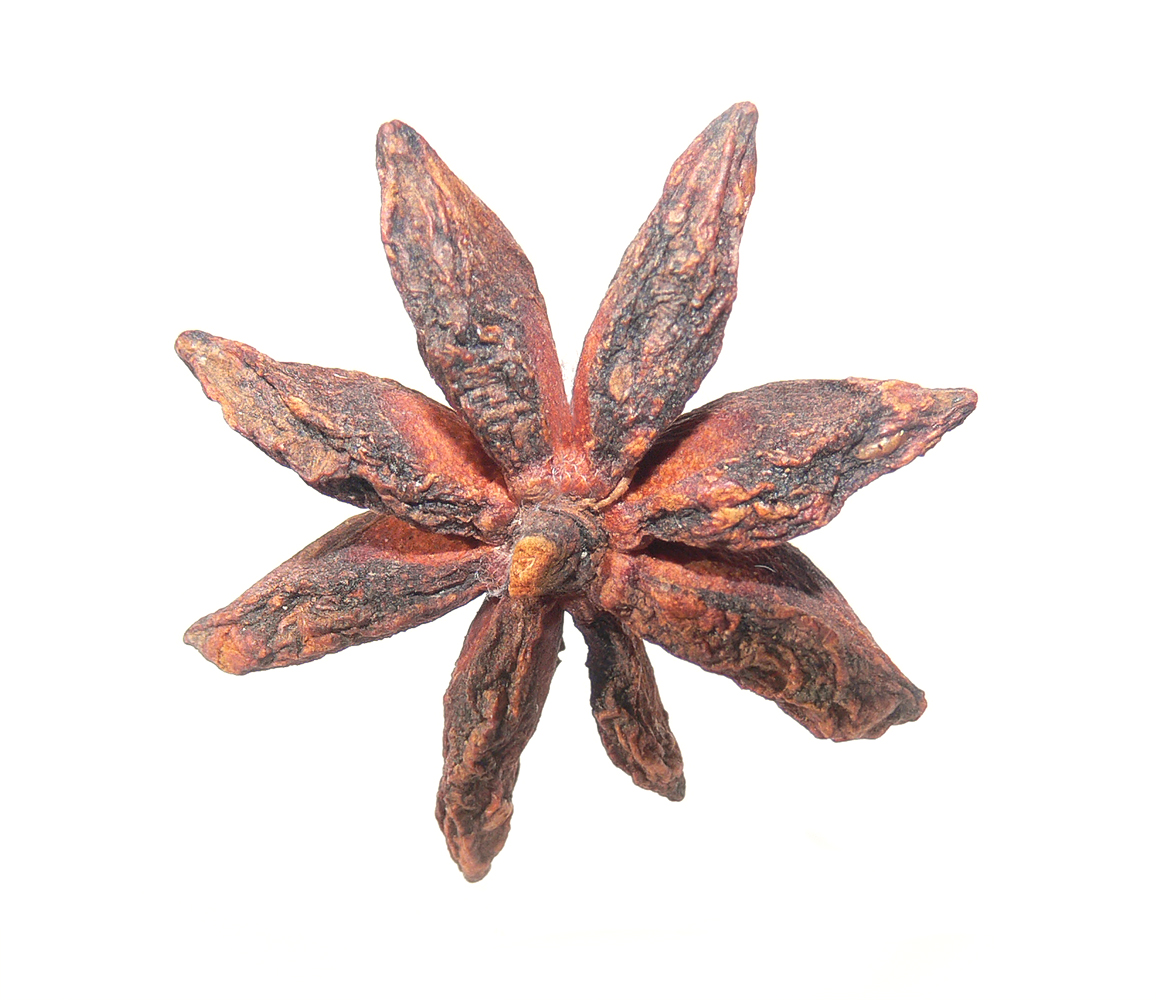
Reverse side of fruit

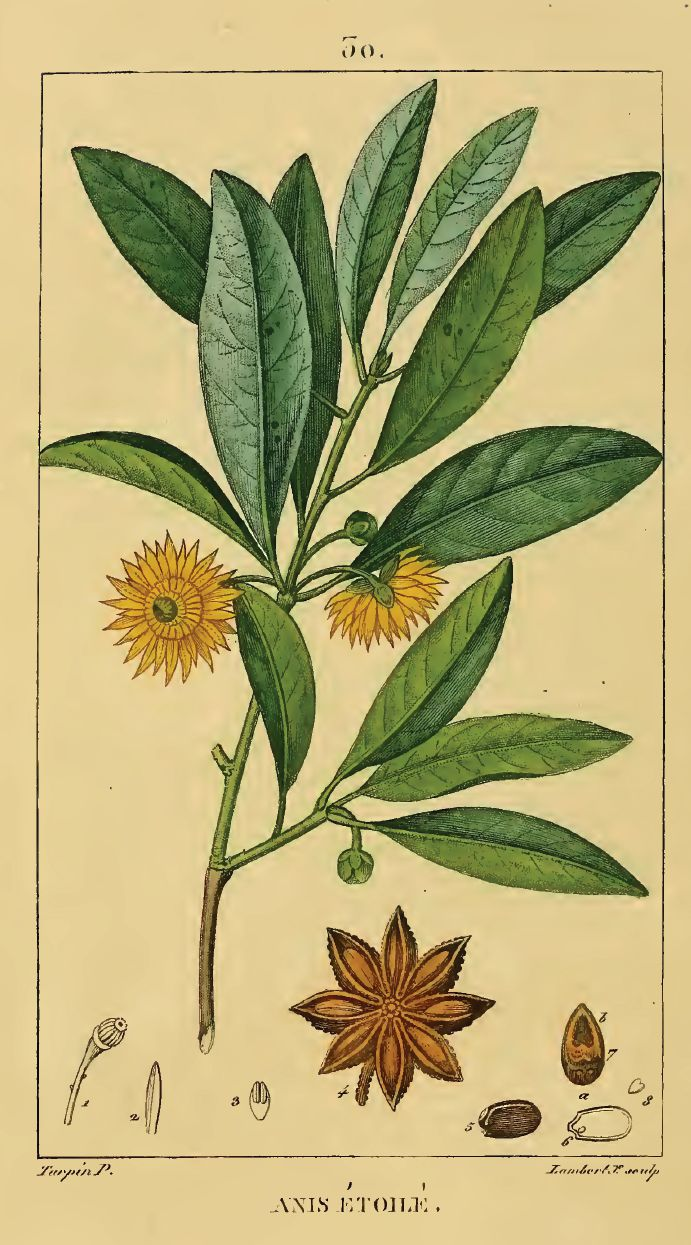
Plate from François-Pierre Chaumeton's 1833 Flore Medicale

Star anise contains anethole, the same compound that gives anise, an unrelated plant, its flavor. Star anise has come into use in the West as a less expensive substitute for anise in baking, as well as in liquor production, most distinctively in the production of the liqueur Galliano. Star anise enhances the flavor of meat.

It is used as a spice in preparation of biryani and masala chai in some parts of the Indian subcontinent. It is widely used in Chinese cuisine, and in Malay and Indonesian cuisines. It is widely grown for commercial use in China, India, and most other countries in Asia. Star anise is an ingredient of the traditional five-spice powder of Chinese cooking. It is also a major ingredient in the making of phở, a Vietnamese noodle soup.

It is also used in the French recipe of mulled wine, vin chaud (hot wine). If allowed to steep in coffee, it deepens and enriches the flavor. The pods can be used in this manner multiple times by the potful or cup, as the ease of extraction of the taste components increases with the permeation of hot water.

=== Drug precursor ===
Star anise is the major source of the chemical compound shikimic acid, a primary precursor in the pharmaceutical synthesis of the anti-influenza drug oseltamivir (Tamiflu). An industrial method for the production of shikimic acid using fermentation of E. coli bacteria was discovered in 2005, and applied in the 2009 swine flu pandemic to address Tamiflu shortages, eventually reversing price increases for star anise as a raw material of shikimic acid. As of 2018, fermentation of E. coli was the manufacturing process of choice to produce shikimic acid for synthesis of Tamiflu.

== Toxicity of related species ==
Illicium verum is not toxic. However, other related species are toxic.

Japanese star anise (Illicium anisatum), a similar tree, is highly toxic and inedible; in Japan, it has instead been burned as incense. Cases of illness, including "serious neurological effects, such as seizures", reported after using star anise tea may be a result of deliberate economically motivated adulteration with this species. Japanese star anise contains the neurotoxin anisatin, which also causes severe inflammation of the kidneys (nephritis), urinary tract, and digestive organs when ingested.

Swamp star anise Illicium parviflorum, a similar tree found in the southern United States, is highly toxic and should not be used for folk remedies or as a cooking ingredient.

== ISO standardization ==
- ISO 676:1995 – contains the information about the nomenclature of the variety and cultivars

=== Identification ===
- Refer to the 4th edition of the European Pharmacopoeia (1153)

=== Differentiation from other species ===
Joshi et al. have used fluorescent microscopy and gas chromatography to distinguish the species, while Lederer et al. employed thin layer chromatography with HPLC-MS/MS.

=== Specifications ===
- ISO 11178:1995 – a specification for its dried fruits
