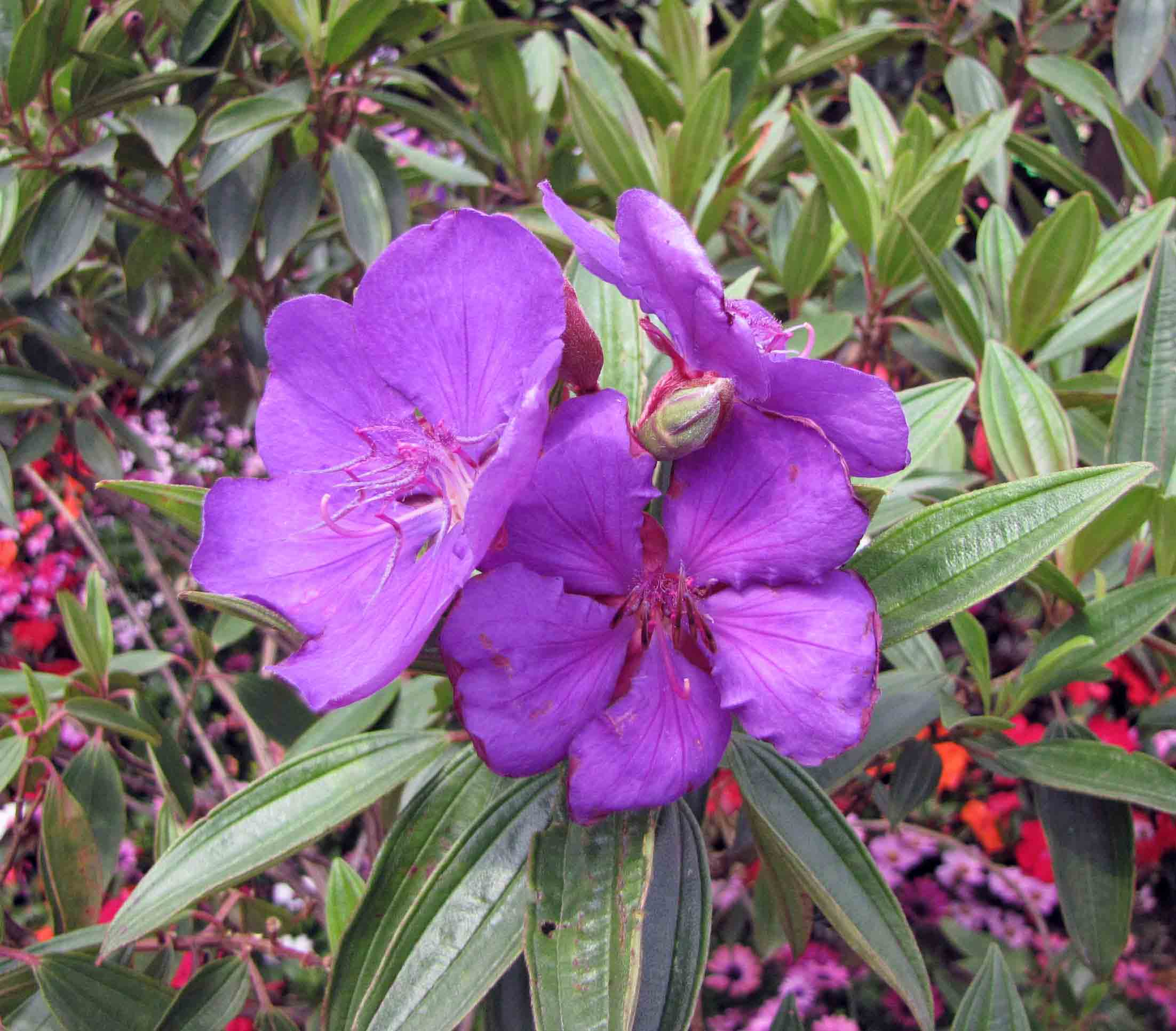

Scientific classification
- Kingdom: Plantae
- Clade: Tracheophytes
- Clade: Angiosperms
- Clade: Eudicots
- Clade: Rosids
- Order: Myrtales
- Family: Melastomataceae
- Genus: Chaetogastra
- Species: C. cornuta

Binomial name
- Chaetogastra cornuta (Gleason) P.J.F.Guim. & Michelang. 2019

Synonyms
- Tibouchina cornuta Gleason 1939

= Chaetogastra cornuta =

Species of plant

Chaetogastra cornuta is a species of Chaetogastra found in La Paz, Bolivia.
