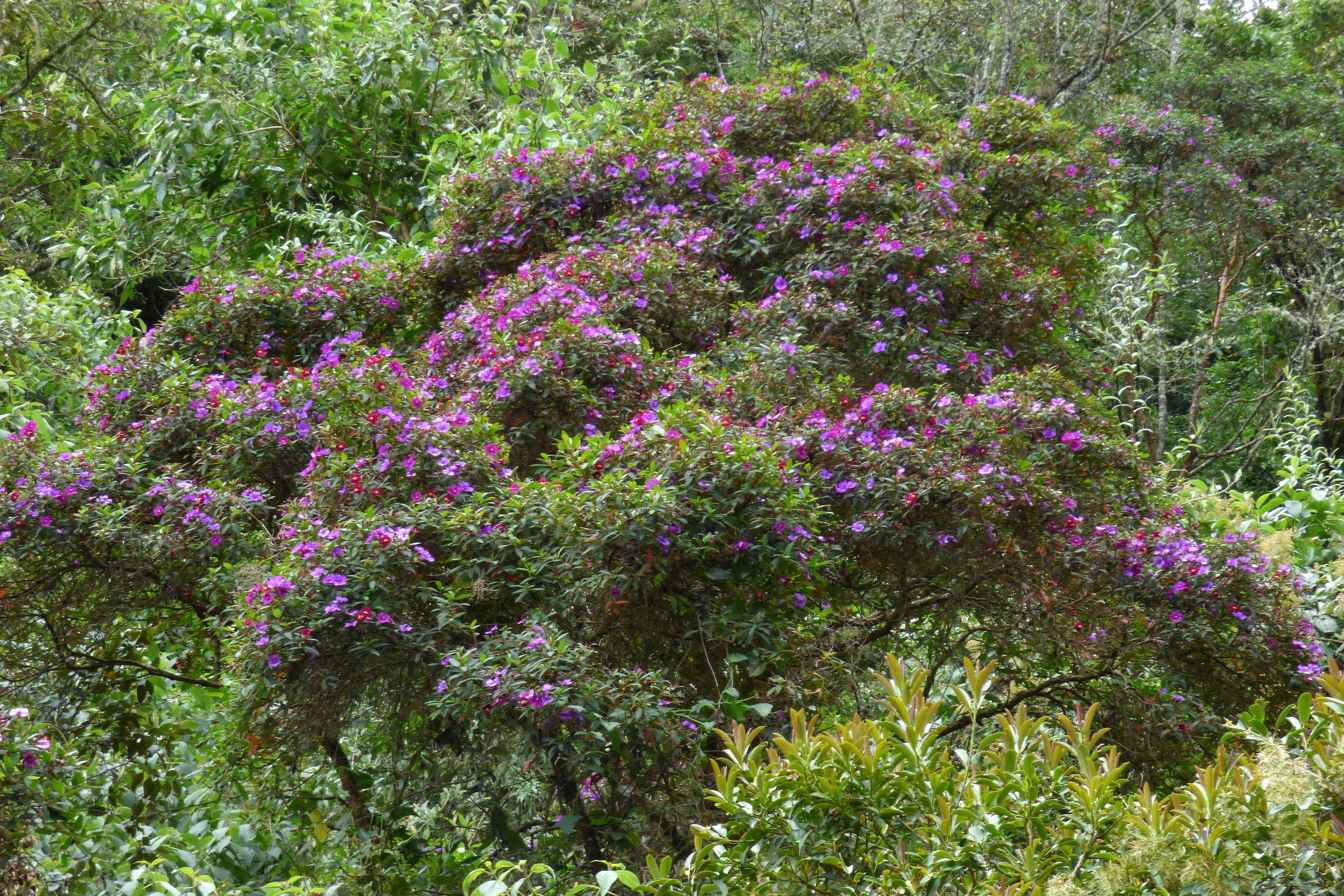
- Andesanthus lepidotus (syn. Tibouchina lepidota)

Scientific classification
- Kingdom: Plantae
- Clade: Tracheophytes
- Clade: Angiosperms
- Clade: Eudicots
- Clade: Rosids
- Order: Myrtales
- Family: Melastomataceae
- Genus: Andesanthus; P.J.F.Guim. & Michelang.

Species
- See text.

= Andesanthus =

Genus of plants

Andesanthus is a genus of flowering plant in the family Melastomataceae, native to Colombia, Costa Rica, Ecuador, Panama, Peru and Venezuela. The genus was established in 2019 for some species formerly placed in Tibouchina. Some species are cultivated as ornamental shrubs or trees.

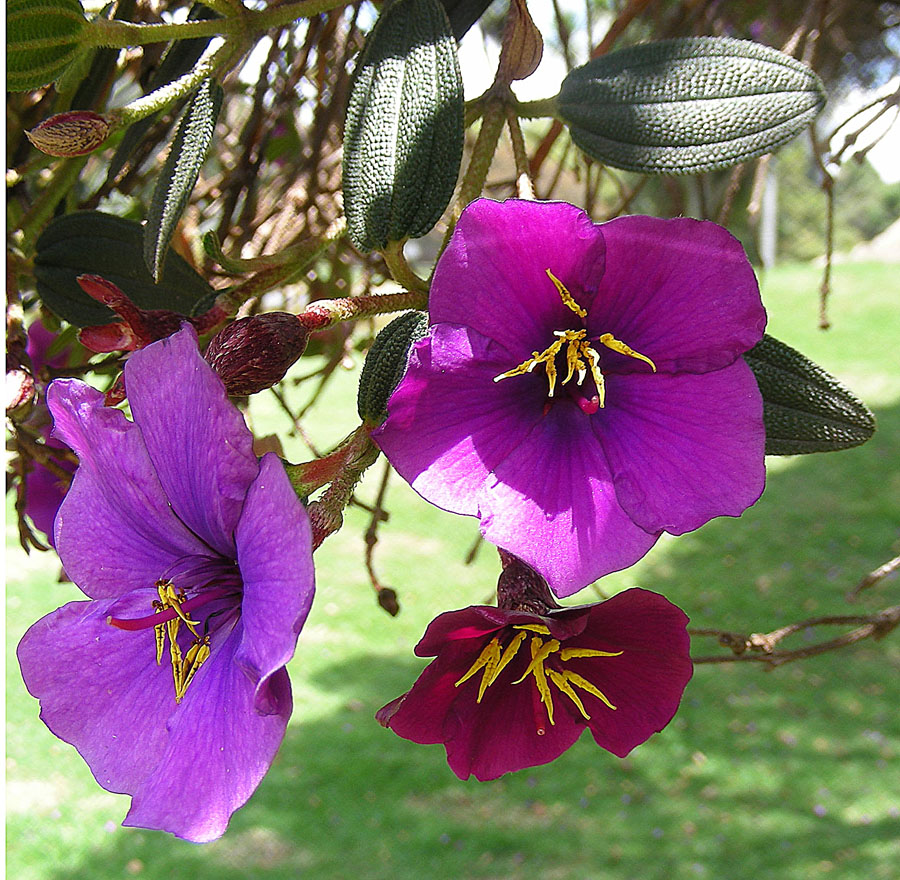
Flowers of Andesanthus lepidotus, showing colour change as they age

== Description ==
Species of Andesanthus are trees between 5 and 20 m tall at maturity or shrubs 1–3 m tall. Their leaves are opposite and petiolate (stalked). The inflorescence is a terminal panicle or some modification of a panicle. The flowers are perigynous with a bell- or urn-shaped hypanthium, externally covered with many soft hairs (pubescent) in most species. The flowers have five free petals, which are pink, purple, magenta or white in colour, or initially magenta or rose-red fading to lavender with age. Flowers have ten stamens, either all the same size or in two distinct sizes. The connective at the base of the anther of the stamen is prolonged and modified into a bilobed ventral appendage. The numerous seeds are shaped like a spiral (cochleate) which may be elongated.

Andesanthus can be distinguished by its coating of small flattened scales (lepidote), hairless (glabrous) stamens which either have all their anthers yellow if of one size or have the larger anthers yellow and the smaller anthers pink or red if of two sizes.

== Taxonomy ==
The genus Andesanthus was erected in 2019. The name reflects the fact that the majority of species occur in the Andes.

In 1885, in his treatment for Flora brasiliensis, Alfred Cogniaux used a broad concept of the genus Tibouchina, transferring into it species at that time placed in many other genera. This broad concept was generally adopted subsequently, and around 470 taxa were at one time or another assigned to Tibouchina, including those placed in Andesanthus in 2019. A phylogenetic analysis in 2013 based on molecular data (2 plastid and 1 nuclear regions) showed that the traditional circumscription of Tibouchina was paraphyletic. Four major clades were resolved within the genus, which were supported by morphological, molecular and geographic evidence. A further molecular phylogenetic study in 2019 used the same molecular markers but included more species. It reached the same conclusion: the original broadly circumscribed Tibouchina consisted of four monophyletic clades. The authors proposed a split into four genera: a more narrowly circumscribed Tibouchina, two re-established genera Pleroma and Chaetogastra, and a new genus, Andesanthus. The part of their maximum likelihood cladogram which includes former Tibouchina species is as follows, using their genus names and with shading added to show the original broadly circumscribed Tibouchina s.l. (The relationship between Chaetogastra and the genus Brachyotum differed between analyses.)

- - - Tibouchina s.s.
    - Pleroma
  - - clade 1 (other genera)
    - clade 2 (other genera)
    - - Andesanthus
      - Chaetogastra / Brachyotum

Andesanthus is shown to be sister to either Chaetogastra or a clade combining Chaetogastra and Brachyotum.

=== Species ===
As of April 2022, Plants of the World Online accepted the following nine species:

- Andesanthus aristeguietae (Wurdack) P.J.F.Guim. & Michelang.
- Andesanthus elegantulus (Todzia & Almeda) P.J.F.Guim. & Michelang.
- Andesanthus gleasonianus (Wurdack) P.J.F.Guim. & Michelang.
- Andesanthus inopinatus (Wurdack) P.J.F.Guim. & Michelang.
- Andesanthus lepidotus (Humb. & Bonpl.) P.J.F.Guim. & Michelang.
- Andesanthus narinoensis (Wurdack) P.J.F.Guim. & Michelang.
- Andesanthus paleaceus (Triana) P.J.F.Guim. & Michelang.
- Andesanthus silvestris (Todzia & Almeda) P.J.F.Guim. & Michelang.
- Andesanthus wurdackii (Almeda & Todzia) P.J.F.Guim. & Michelang.

== Distribution and habitat ==
Andesanthus species are found in Central America (Costa Rica and Panama) and northern South America (Colombia, Ecuador, Peru and Venezuela). Most are found in the Andes. Two species are found in the mountains of Costa Rica and Panama. The largest number of species are found in Colombia. They grow in cool montane forests and along forest margins.

== Cultivation ==
Some species of Andesanthus are cultivated as ornamental shrubs or trees. The cultivar 'Alstonville' of Andesanthus lepidotus (syn. Tibouchina lepidota) was developed in Alstonville, New South Wales in Australia, where this species and its cultivars are popular cultivated plants.
