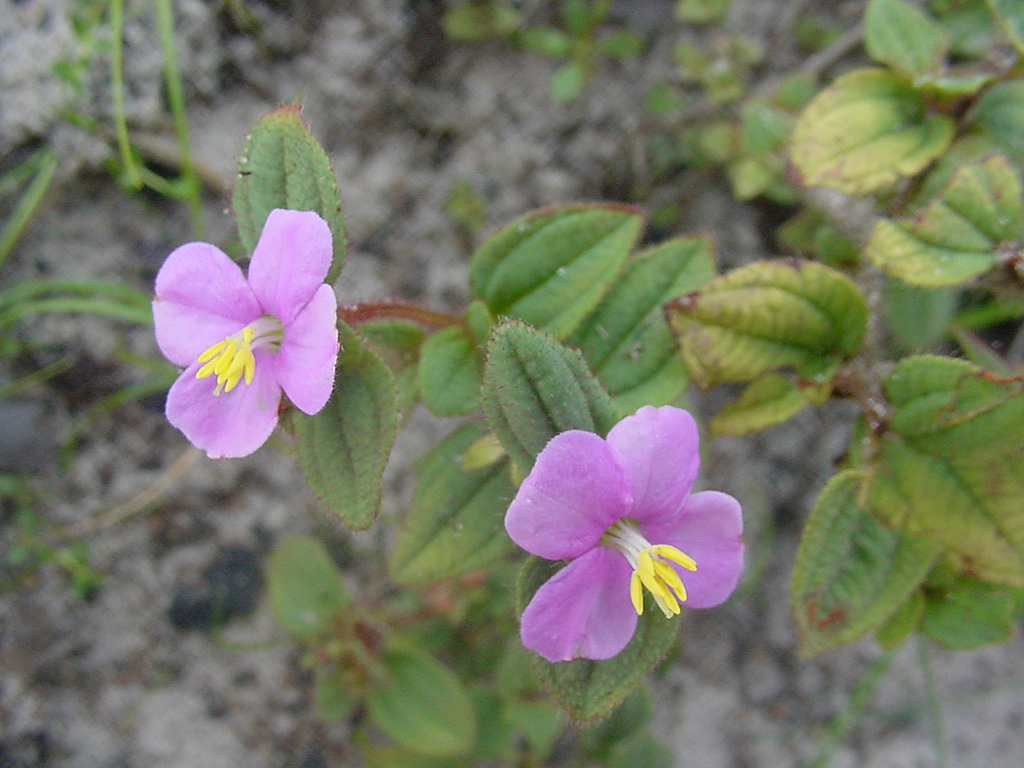

Scientific classification
- Kingdom: Plantae
- Clade: Tracheophytes
- Clade: Angiosperms
- Clade: Eudicots
- Clade: Rosids
- Order: Myrtales
- Family: Melastomataceae
- Genus: Chaetogastra
- Species: C. versicolor

Binomial name
- Chaetogastra versicolor (Lindl.) P.J.F.Guim. & Michelang.

Synonyms
- Arthrostemma versicolor (Lindl.) DC.; Pleroma meiodon (Stapf) Mottet; Pterolepis versicolor (Lindl.) Triana; Rhexia versicolor Lindl.; Tetrameris isanthera Naudin; Tetrameris versicolor (Lindl.) Naudin; Tibouchina meiodon Stapf; Tibouchina versicolor (Lindl.) Cogn.

= Chaetogastra versicolor =

Species of flowering plant

Chaetogastra versicolor is a species of flowering plant in the family Melastomataceae, native to Brazil. It was first described by John Lindley in 1827 as Rhexia versicolor. One of its synonyms is Tibouchina versicolor.

Chaetogastra versicolor has flowers with four petals and eight stamens, rather than five and ten as in many other species of Chaetogastra. The petals are white, turning pink as they age. The leaves are reddish underneath.

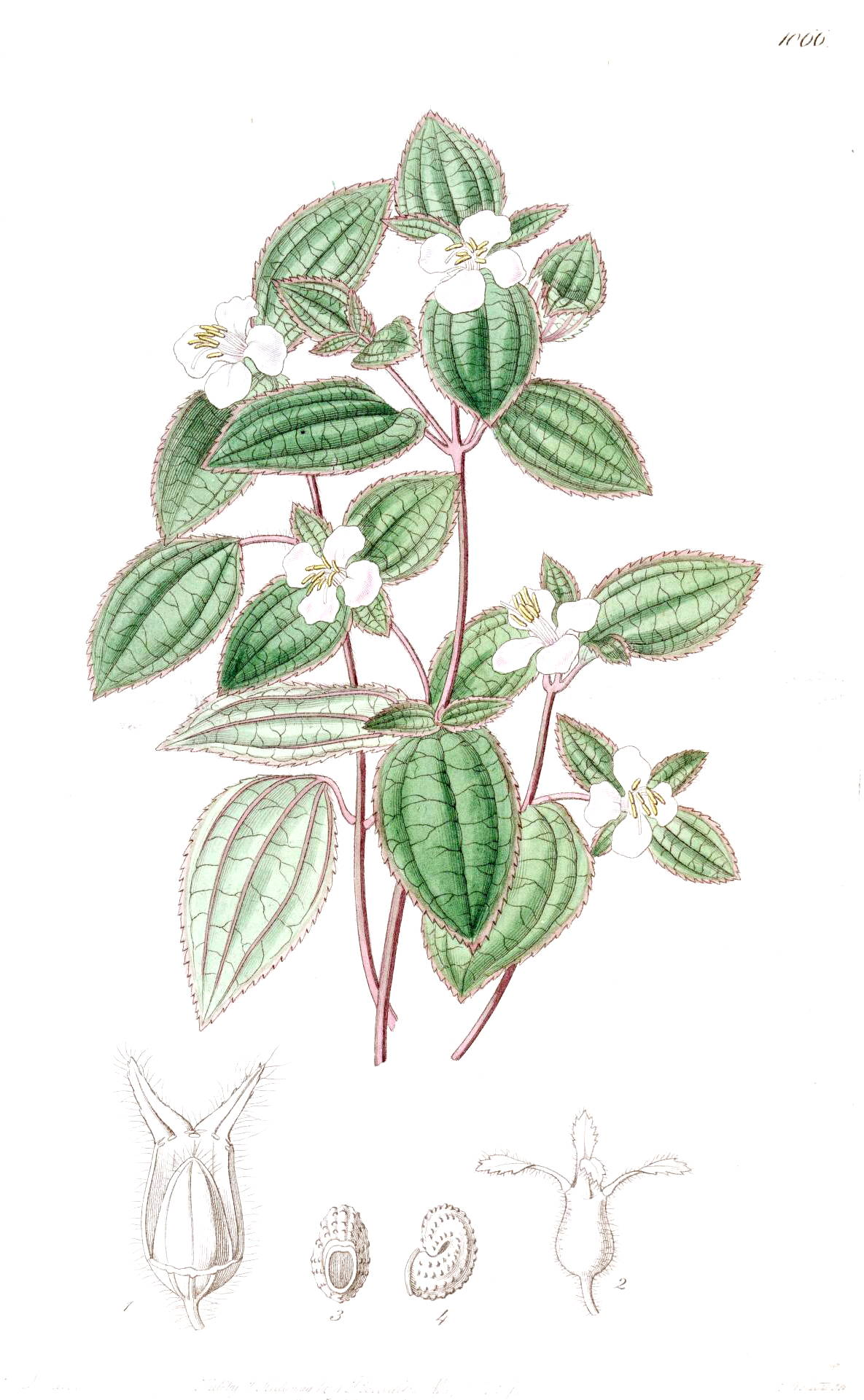
Original botanical illustration of 1827

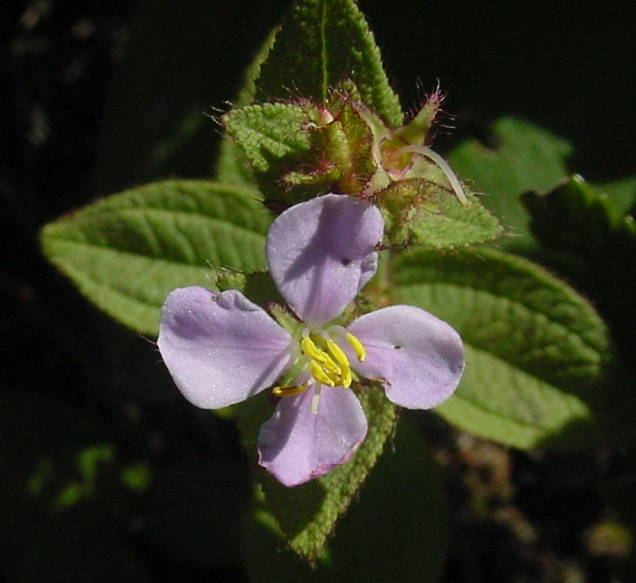
Flower
