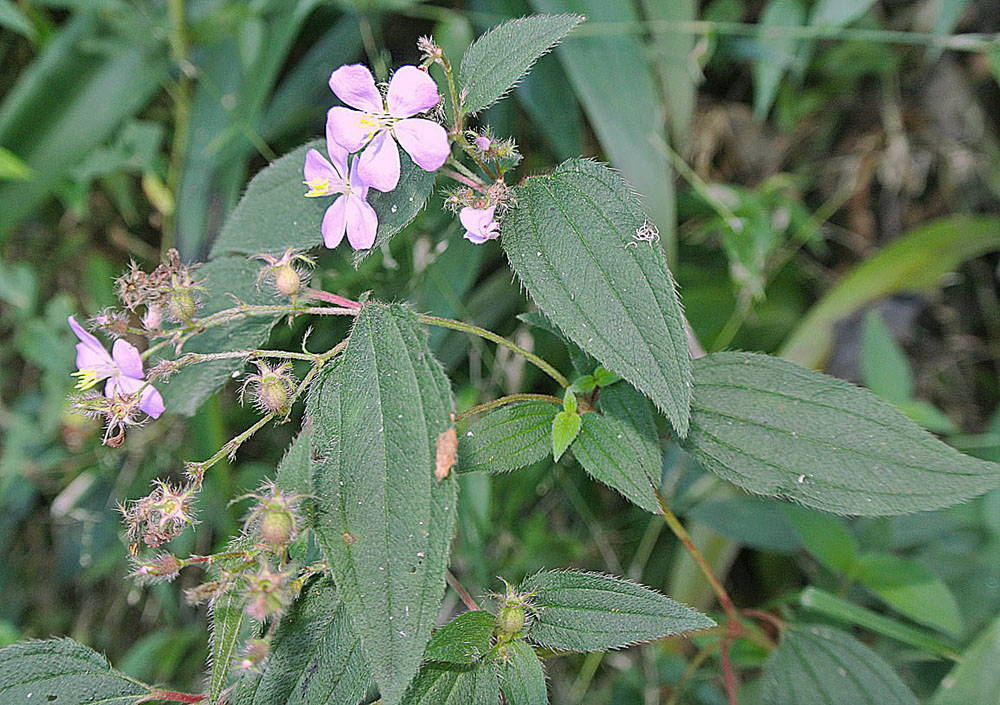
- In the Sierra Maihuatlan, southern Mexico

Scientific classification
- Kingdom: Plantae
- Clade: Tracheophytes
- Clade: Angiosperms
- Clade: Eudicots
- Clade: Rosids
- Order: Myrtales
- Family: Melastomataceae
- Genus: Chaetogastra
- Species: C. rufipilis

Binomial name
- Chaetogastra rufipilis (Schltdl.) Walp.

Synonyms
- Pleroma rufipile (Schltdl.) Triana; Rhexia rufipilis Schltdl.; Rhexia schiedeana var. macrantha Cham. & Schltdl.; Tibouchina rufipilis (Schltdl.) Cogn.

= Chaetogastra rufipilis =

Species of flowering plant

Chaetogastra rufipilis is a species of flowering plant in the family Melastomataceae, native to Mexico. It was first described by Diederich von Schlechtendal in 1839 as Rhexia rufipilis. One of its synonyms is Tibouchina rufipilis.
