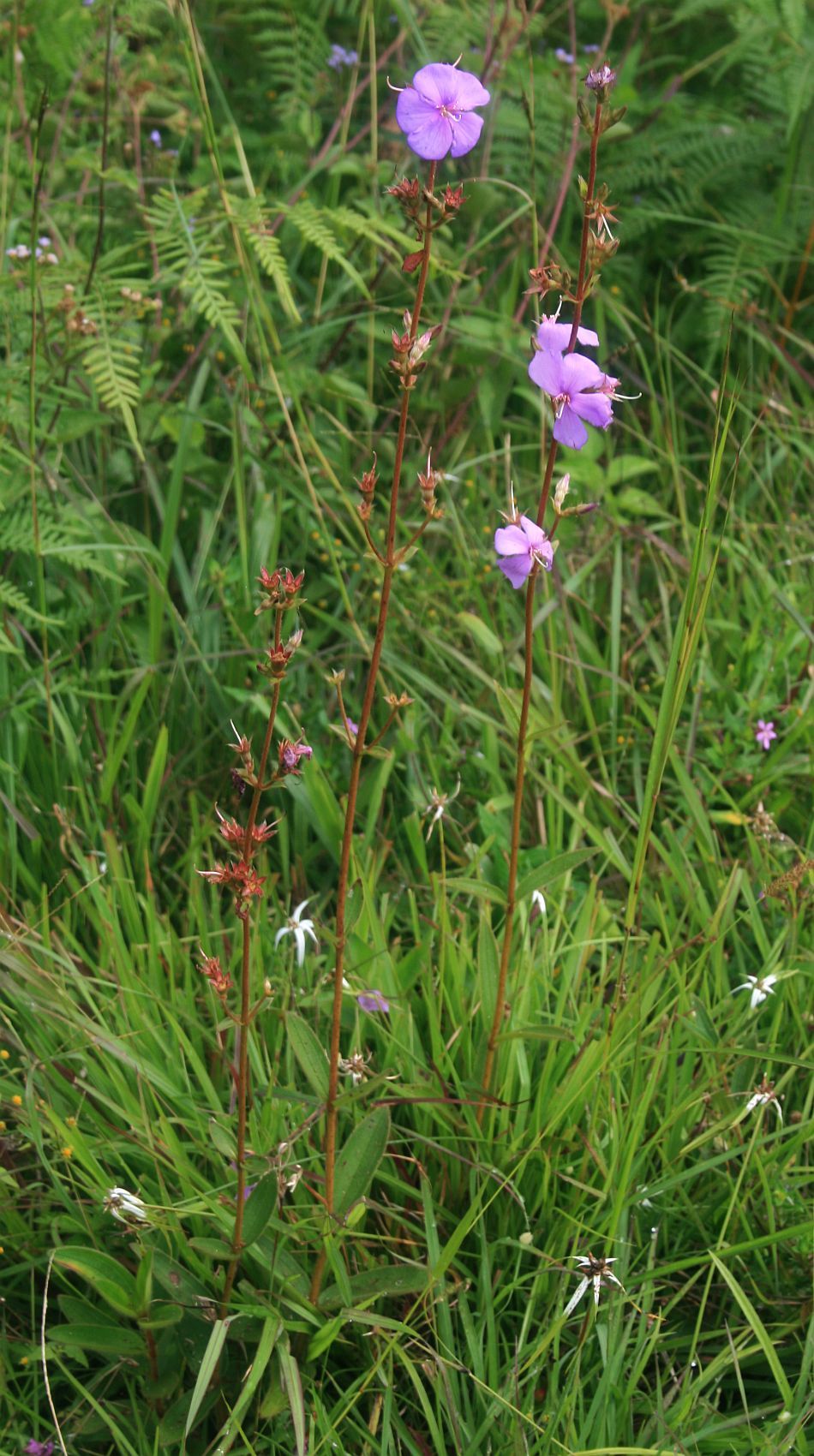
- Growing in Colombia

Scientific classification
- Kingdom: Plantae
- Clade: Tracheophytes
- Clade: Angiosperms
- Clade: Eudicots
- Clade: Rosids
- Order: Myrtales
- Family: Melastomataceae
- Genus: Chaetogastra
- Species: C. gracilis

Binomial name
- Chaetogastra gracilis (Bonpl.) DC.

Synonyms
- Chaetogastra fraterna DC.; Chaetogastra hirsuta DC.; Chaetogastra strigillosa DC.; Lasiandra gracilis (Bonpl.) Naudin; Lasiandra hirsuta Naudin; Pleroma gracile (Bonpl.) A.Gray; Pleroma pulchellum Griseb.; Pleroma pulchrum Cogn.; Rhexia agrostemma Mart. & Schrank ex DC.; Rhexia gracilis Bonpl.; Tibouchina gracilis (Bonpl.) Cogn.

= Chaetogastra gracilis =

Species of flowering plant

Chaetogastra gracilis is a species of flowering plant in the family Melastomataceae. It is native to much of South America, from Venezuela in the north to northeast Argentina in the south. It was first described in 1823 by Aimé Bonpland as Rhexia gracilis. Its synonyms include Tibouchina gracilis.

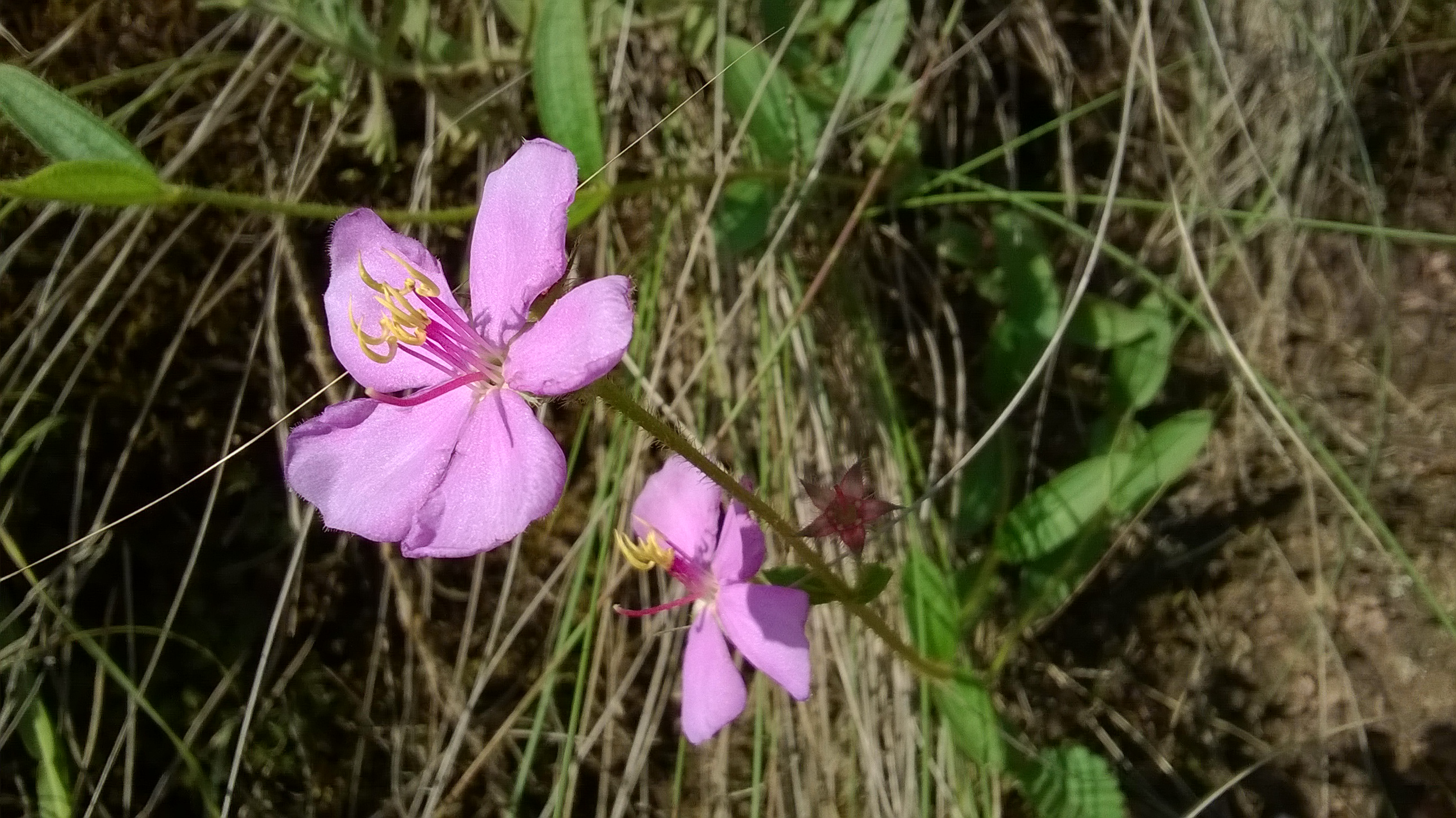
Flower, growing in Brazil
