= Chaetogastra oroensis =

Conservation status
- Vulnerable (IUCN 3.1)

Scientific classification
- Kingdom: Plantae
- Clade: Tracheophytes
- Clade: Angiosperms
- Clade: Eudicots
- Clade: Rosids
- Order: Myrtales
- Family: Melastomataceae
- Genus: Chaetogastra
- Species: C. oroensis

Binomial name
- Chaetogastra oroensis (Gleason) P.J.F.Guim. & Michelang.

Synonyms
- Tibouchina oroensis Gleason

Species of flowering plant

Chaetogastra oroensis, synonym Tibouchina oroensis, is a species of plant in the family Melastomataceae. It is endemic to Ecuador.
