= Andesanthus gleasonianus =

Conservation status
- Vulnerable (IUCN 2.3)

Scientific classification
- Kingdom: Plantae
- Clade: Tracheophytes
- Clade: Angiosperms
- Clade: Eudicots
- Clade: Rosids
- Order: Myrtales
- Family: Melastomataceae
- Genus: Andesanthus
- Species: A. gleasonianus

Binomial name
- Andesanthus gleasonianus (Wurdack) P.J.F.Guim. & Michelang.

Synonyms
- Tibouchina gleasoniana Wurdack

Species of flowering plant

Andesanthus gleasonianus, synonym Tibouchina gleasoniana, is a species of plant in the family Melastomataceae. It is native to Colombia and Ecuador.
