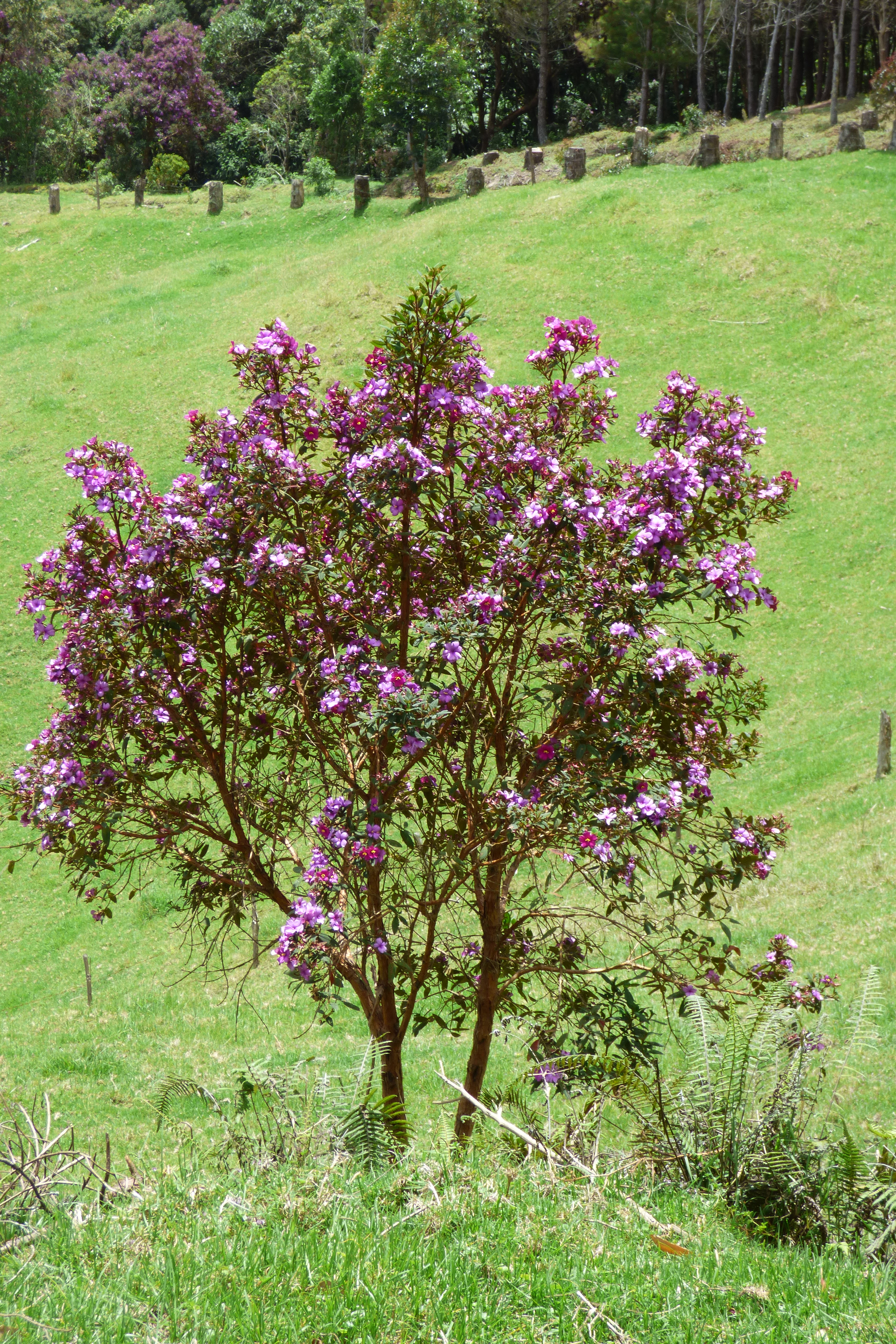

Scientific classification
- Kingdom: Plantae
- Clade: Tracheophytes
- Clade: Angiosperms
- Clade: Eudicots
- Clade: Rosids
- Order: Myrtales
- Family: Melastomataceae
- Genus: Andesanthus
- Species: A. lepidotus

Binomial name
- Andesanthus lepidotus (Humb. & Bonpl.) P.J.F.Guim. & Michelang.

Synonyms
- Chaetogastra lepidota (Humb. & Bonpl.) DC.; Pleroma lepidotum (Humb. & Bonpl.) Triana; Rhexia lepidota Bonpl.; Tibouchina lepidota (Humb. & Bonpl.) Baill.

= Andesanthus lepidotus =

Species of tree

Andesanthus lepidotus, synonym Tibouchina lepidota, also known as alstonville, Andean princess flower, lasiandra, or glory bush, is a medium-sized ornamental tree or a large shrub native to northwestern South America that is cultivated for its masses of purple flowers from autumn right through to winter.

== Description ==
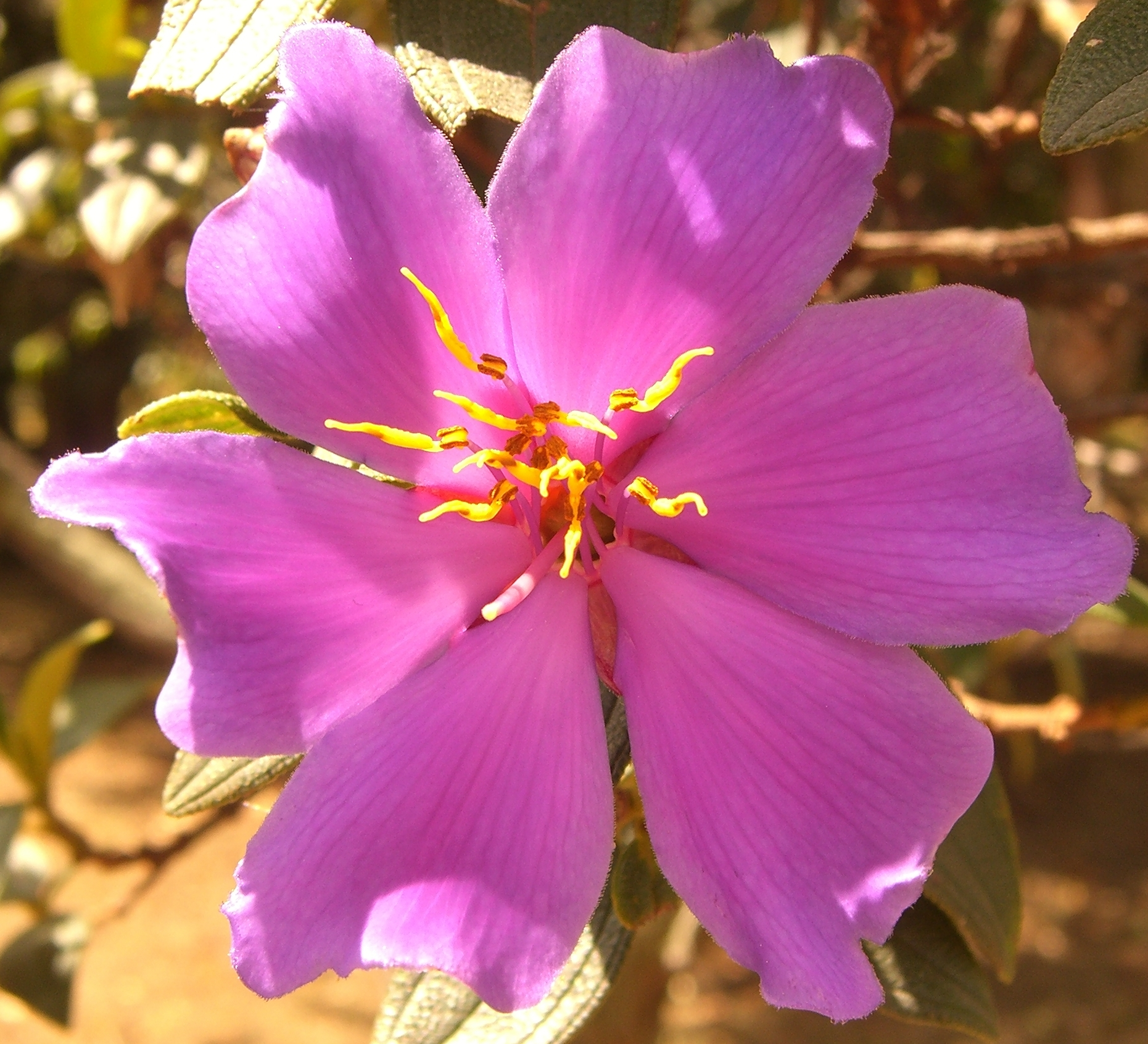
Flower close-up.

The plant is usually between 5 metres (16 ft) to 12 metres (39 ft) tall, but can be as tall as 20 metres (66 ft), creating a vase shape with a spread rounded crown and thick, ligneous, branching stems. The trunk measures up to 80 centimetres (31 in) in diameter at its base, with reddish. flaking bark.

The evergreen leaves are dark green in colour, with lighter undersides and prominent longitudinal veins. They are coarsely hairy, simple, opposite, with a serrated edge, rounded base and a blunt tip. They measure 8 centimetres (3.1 in) long and 4 centimetres (1.6 in) wide. As the leaves age, they turn crimson and are covered by small scales that are brown in colour.

=== Inflorescence ===
The flowers range from violet or mauve to magenta, 6 centimetres (2.4 in) in diameter. The stamens are yellow in color. Flowers are clustered in inflorescences composed of panicles, and have brown, scaly axils. Flowering occurs from late summer to late autumn in the southern hemisphere.

The plant fruits most of the year, primarily between March and December. Ripe seed capsules are light brown in colour, flaky to the touch, cup-shaped, measuring 1.5 centimetres (0.59 in) in diameter. They release numerous small seeds through holes located at the apex, brown in colour, small in size, with a snail-like shape and a hard seed coat.

== Distribution ==
Andesanthus lepidotus is native to the Andes Mountains in Venezuela (Merida and Táchira), Ecuador (Azuay, Carchi, Chimborazo, Imbabura, Loja, Morona-Santiago, Napo, Pichincha, Tungurahua, and Zamora-Chinchipe), and central Peru (Amazonas, Huanuco, San Martin), in the montane humid and cloud forests, between 800 metres (2,600 ft) and 3,200 metres (10,500 ft) above sea level. In Colombia it is distributed in the Andean region, being found wild in the temperate and cool thermal floors. It is also found in Panama.

== Cultivation ==
Andesanthus lepidotus is used as an ornamental plant for its violet coloured flowers. Thriving in full sun to part shade, it is planted in parks, public squares, and gardens. Its wood is used in the manufacture of fencing posts, tool handles, furniture and firewood. It is to be pruned after flowering to encourage dense, bushy growth. It may not withstand severe frost or drought, but may still survive in cooler areas provided that it is sheltered and if it is watered regularly if in dry conditions. It is propagated by means of seeds.

=== Cultivars ===
Andesanthus lepidotus 'Alstonville' is a common cultivar in Australia, which was developed by Ken Dunstan a resident of Alstonville, New South Wales, hence the common name of this plant. There are smaller growing cultivars that are grown in pots or containers in the country, such as 'Jules', which is 60 centimetres high and wide, 'Jazzie', which is a metre in height and features large purple flowers, and 'Groovy Baby’ which is only 45 centimetres high and wide. All these dwarf varieties can be grown in containers, garden beds or as a low hedge. Some may only flower in the warmer months.

In Australia, both this species and Pleroma heteromallum (syn. Tibouchina grandiflora) (including its cultivars) are commonly known as lasiandra. They are in the same family (Melastomataceae) as a native shrub Melastoma affine, which is known as native lasiandra.

== Gallery ==
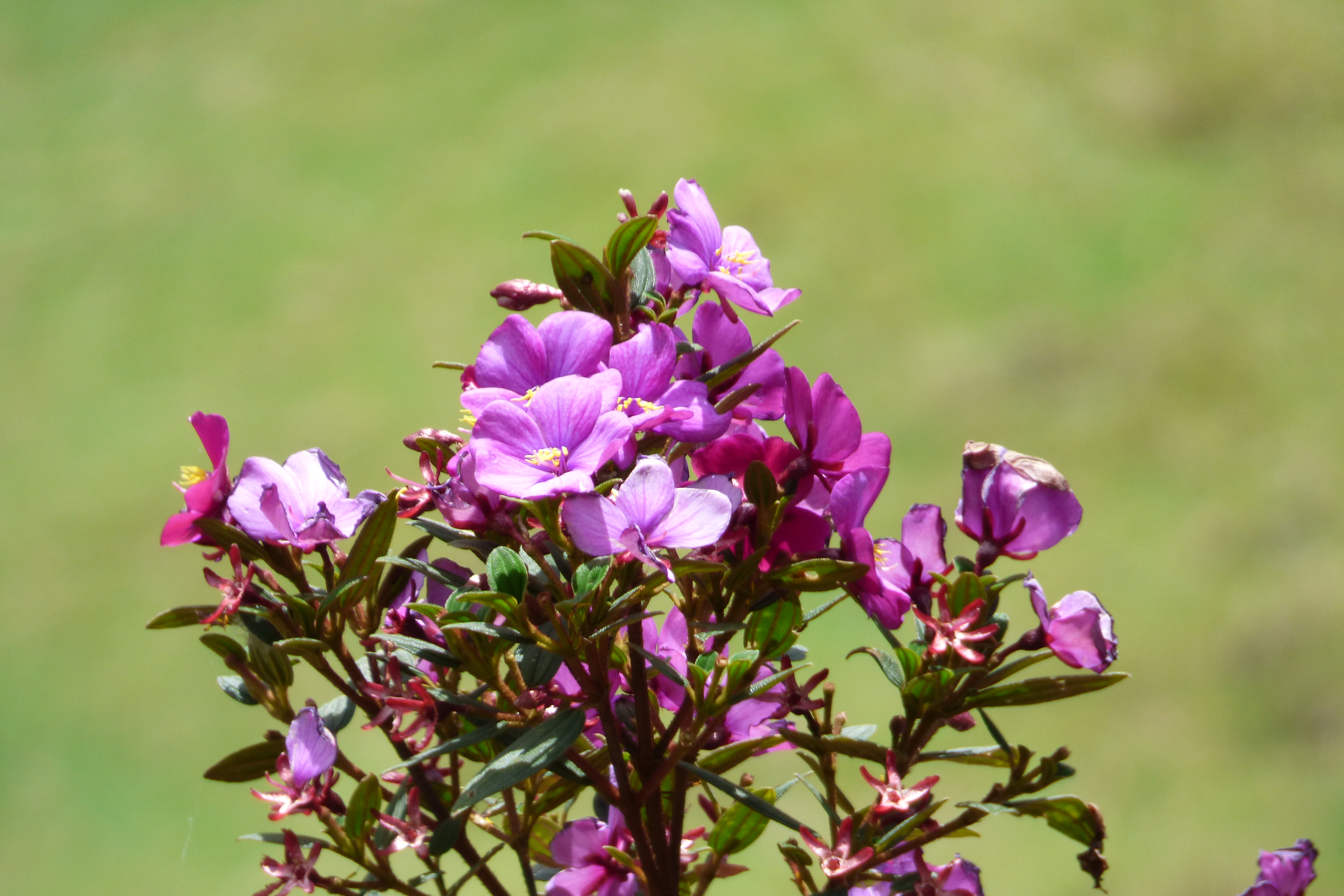
Bunch of flowers

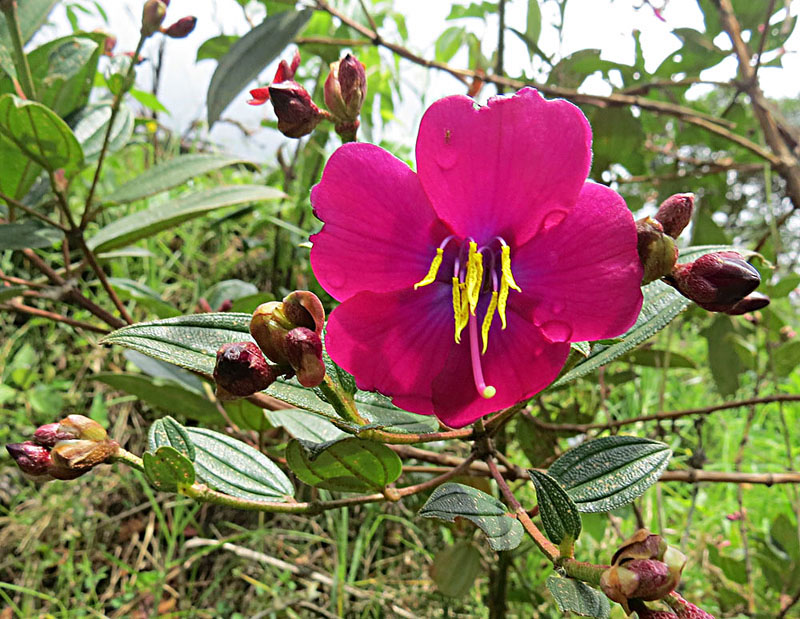
Budding flowers

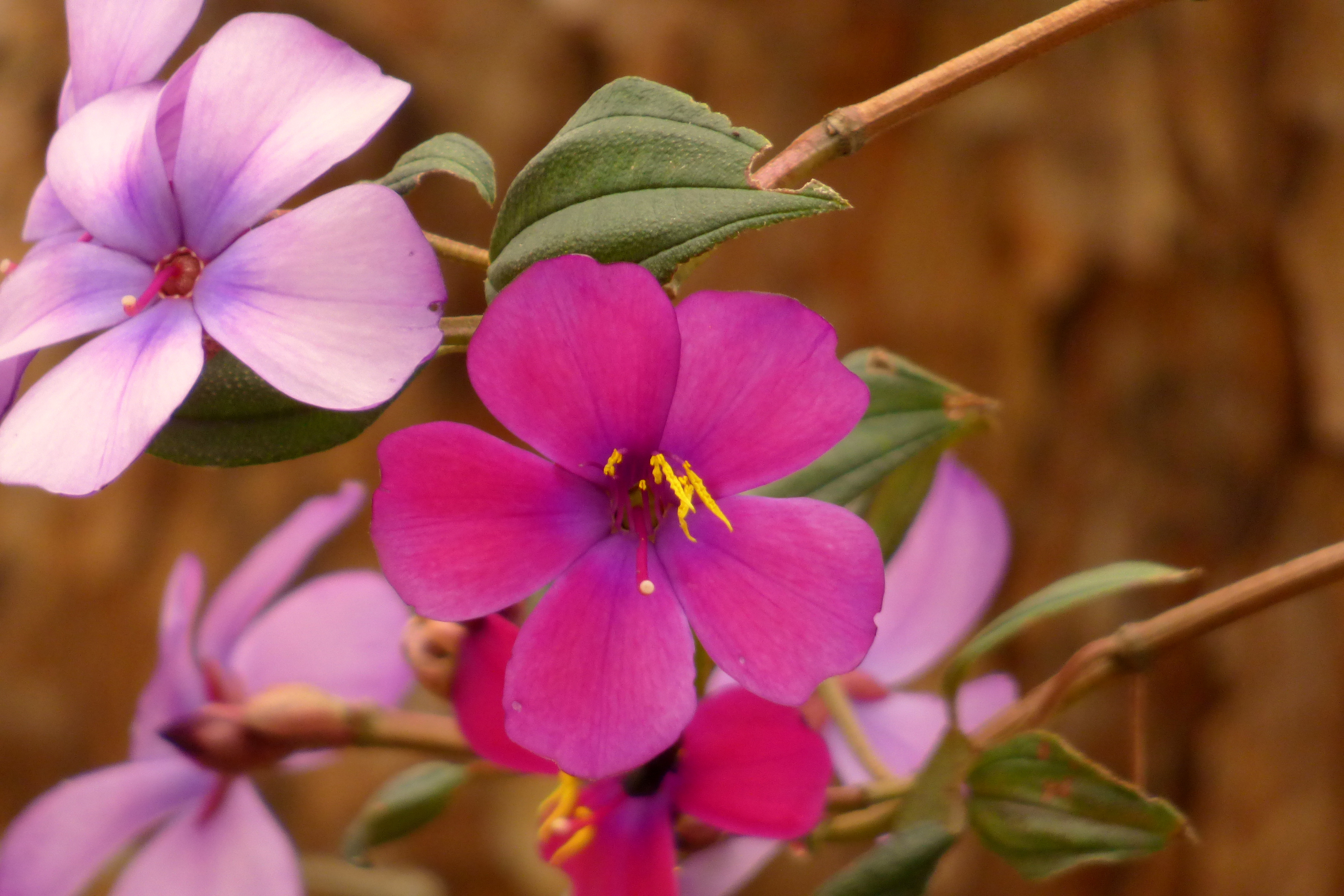
Flowers and leaves

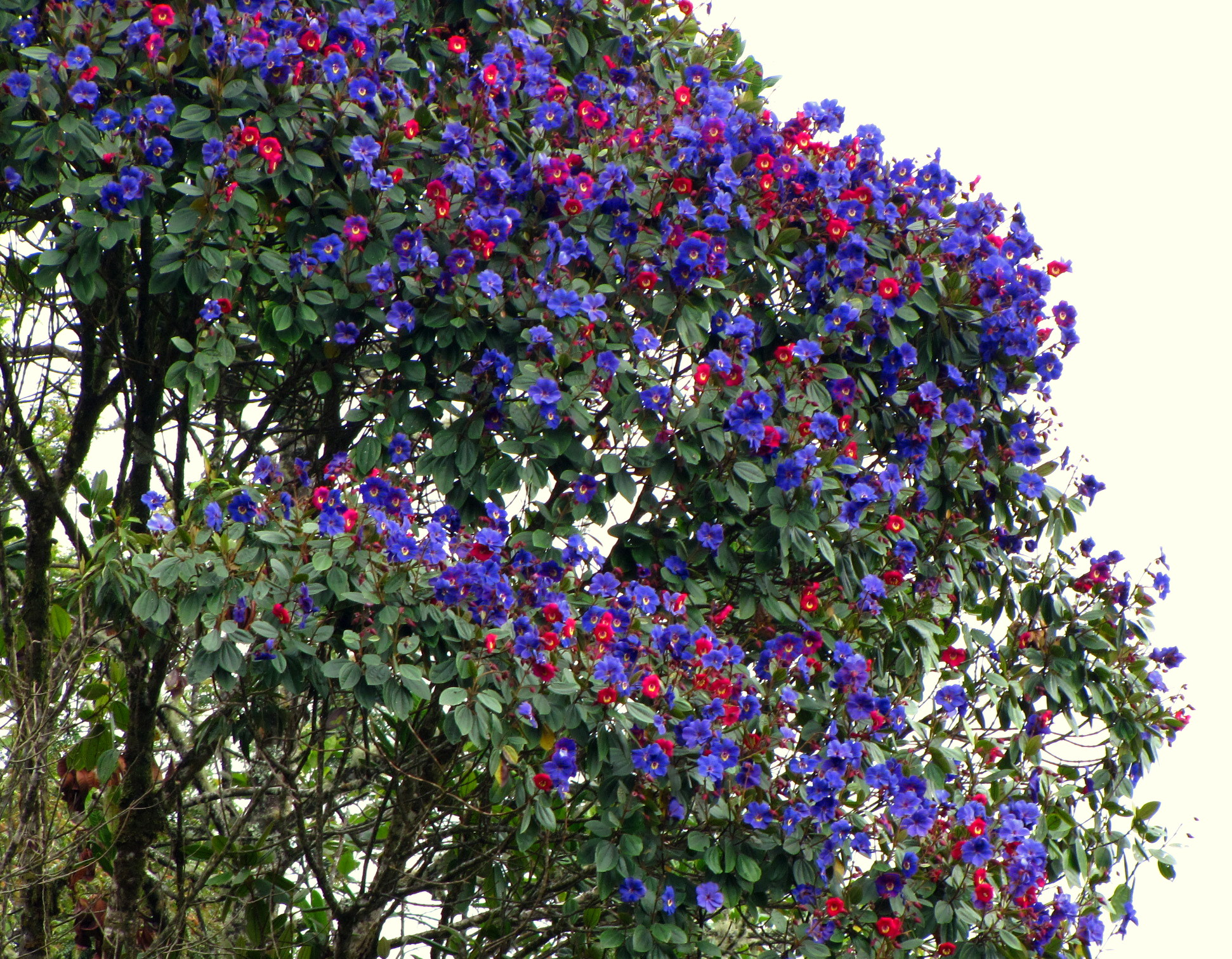
A variety with red and purple flowers

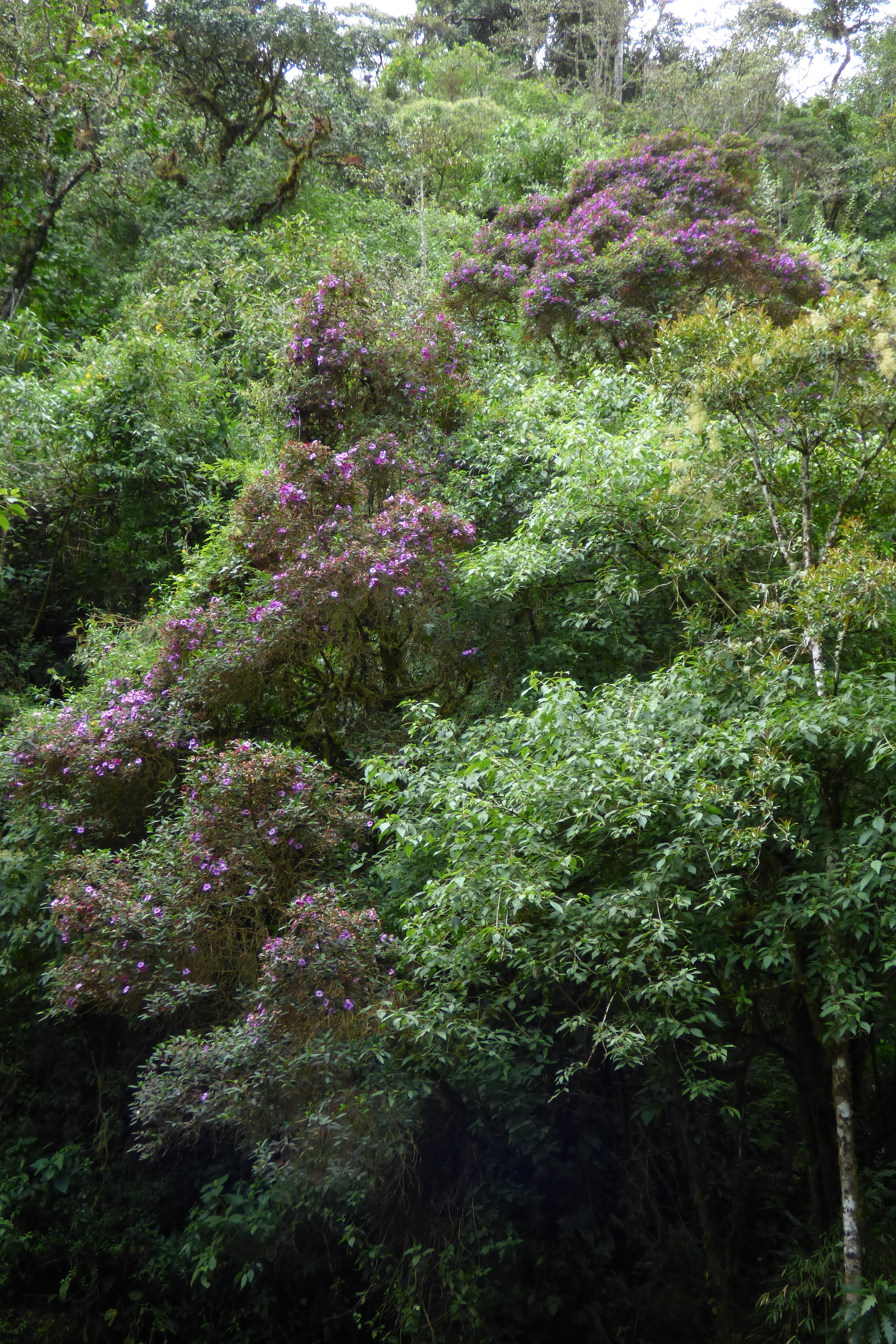
Native habitat

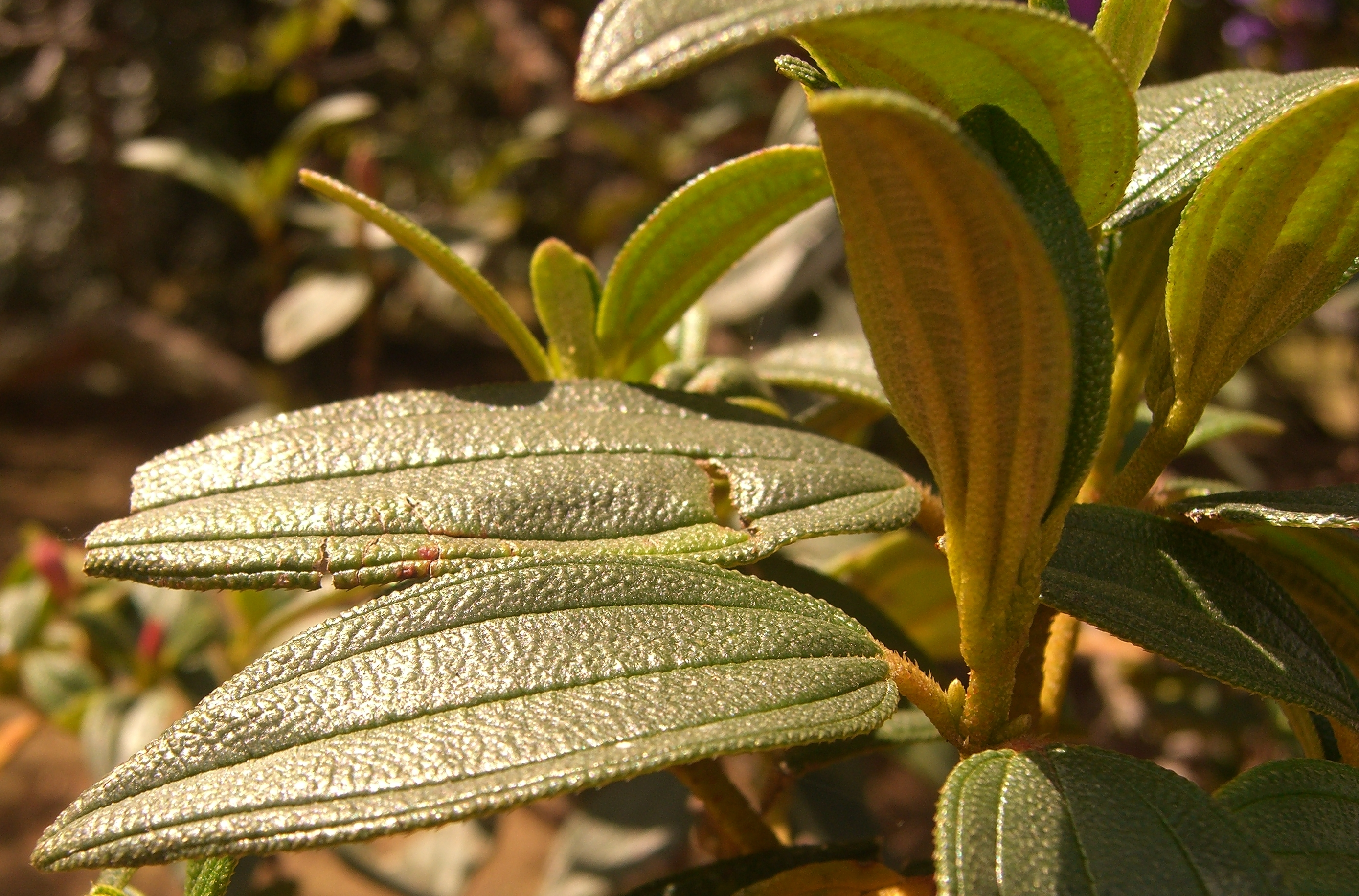
Leaves close up

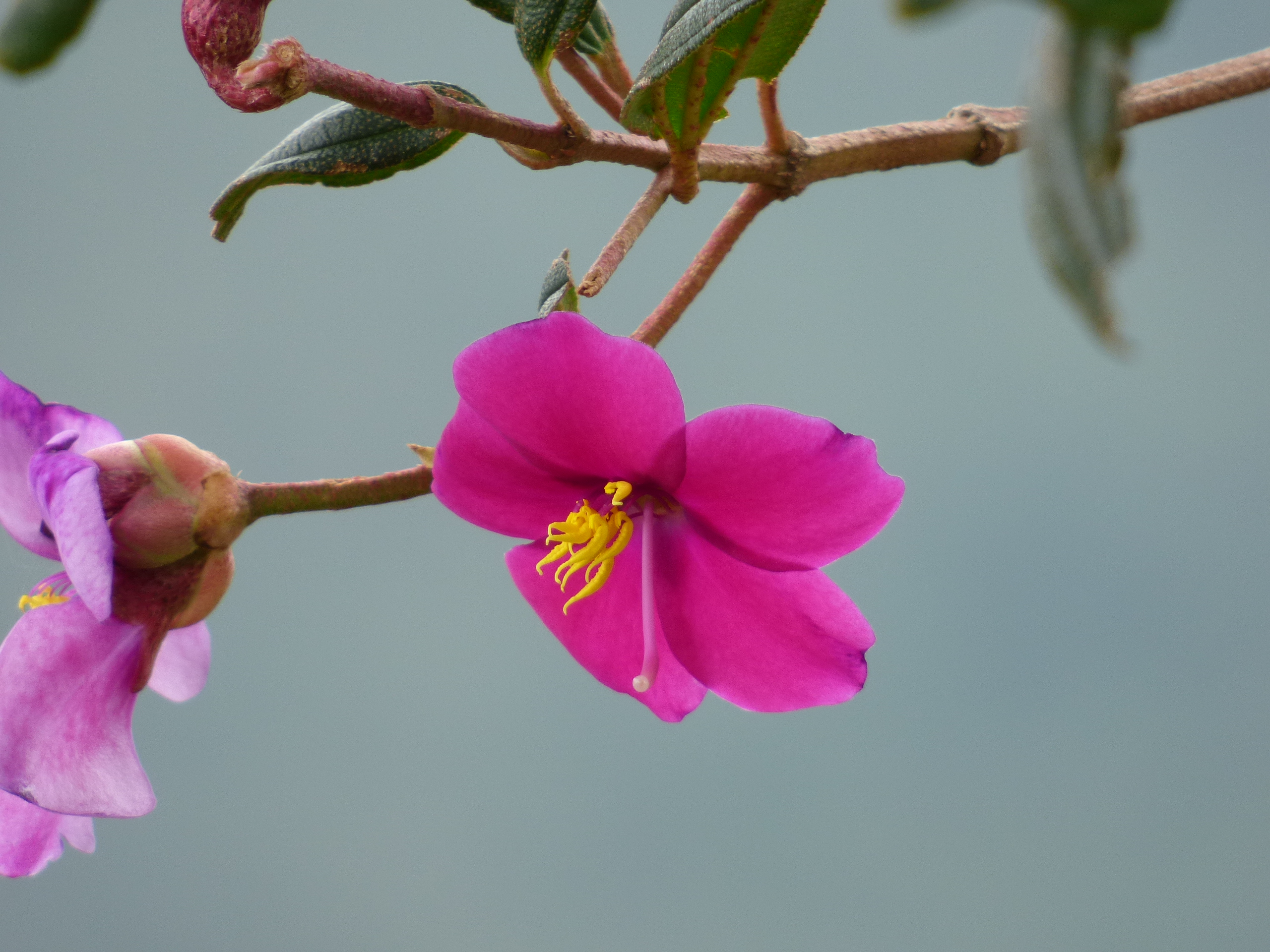
Branch and flowers

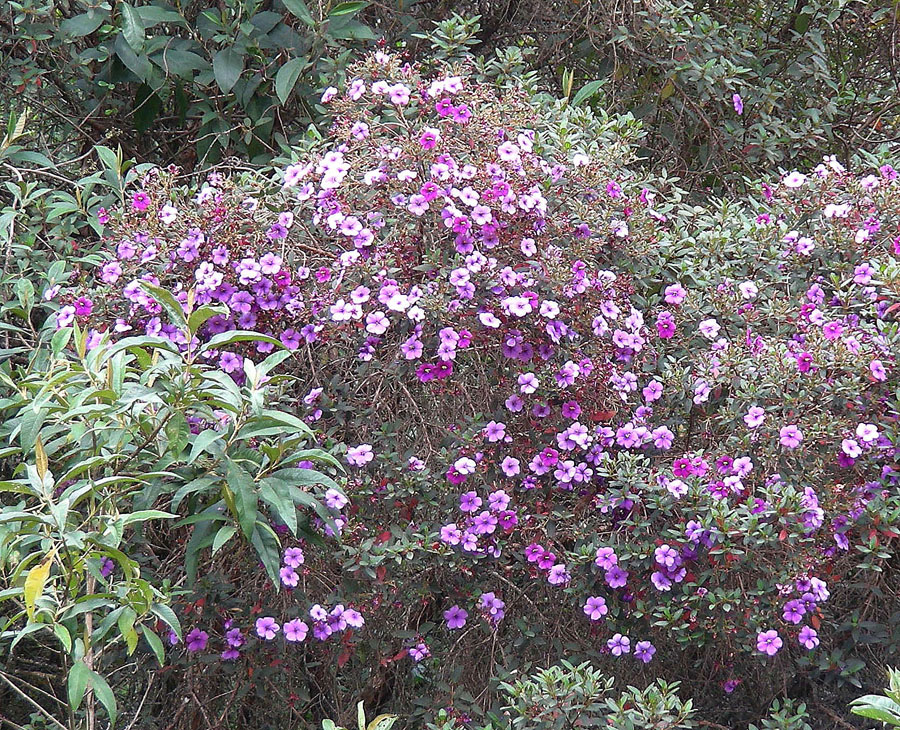
A shrubby specimen
