= Chaetogastra anderssonii =

Conservation status
- Endangered (IUCN 3.1)

Scientific classification
- Kingdom: Plantae
- Clade: Tracheophytes
- Clade: Angiosperms
- Clade: Eudicots
- Clade: Rosids
- Order: Myrtales
- Family: Melastomataceae
- Genus: Chaetogastra
- Species: C. anderssonii

Binomial name
- Chaetogastra anderssonii (Wurdack) P.J.F.Guim. & Michelang.

Synonyms
- Tibouchina anderssonii Wurdack

Species of flowering plant

Chaetogastra anderssonii, synonym Tibouchina anderssonii, is a species of plant in the family Melastomataceae. It is endemic to Ecuador.
