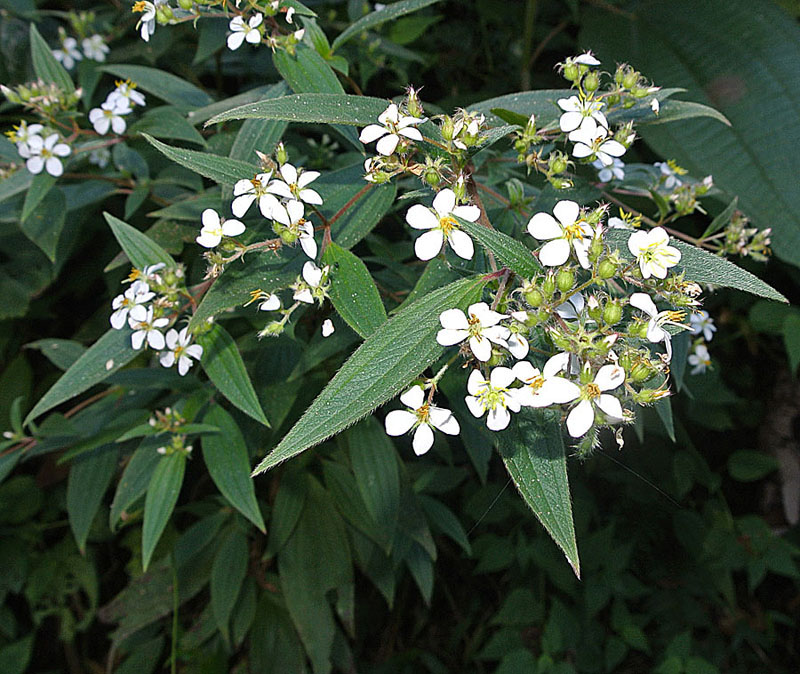

Conservation status
- Least Concern (IUCN 3.1)

- Unranked (NatureServe)

Scientific classification
- Kingdom: Plantae
- Clade: Tracheophytes
- Clade: Angiosperms
- Clade: Eudicots
- Clade: Rosids
- Order: Myrtales
- Family: Melastomataceae
- Genus: Chaetogastra
- Species: C. longifolia

Binomial name
- Chaetogastra longifolia (Vahl) DC.

Synonyms
- Arthrostemma lanceolatum Griseb.; Chaetogastra depauperata Naudin; Chaetogastra dichotoma Ram.Goyena; Chaetogastra ferruginea Hook. & Arn.; Chaetogastra galipensis Klotzsch ex Kuntze; Chaetogastra havanensis DC.; Chaetogastra hispida DC.; Chaetogastra lanceolata DC.; Micranthella hispida Naudin; Micranthella lanceolata Naudin; Micranthella longifolia (Vahl) Naudin; Micranthella rosea Naudin; Pleroma hispidum Triana; Pleroma lanceolatum Griseb.; Pleroma longifolium (Vahl) Triana; Pleroma micranthella C.Wright; Rhexia flexuosa Ruiz & Pav.; Rhexia lanceolata Bonpl.; Rhexia longifolia Vahl; Tibouchina aliena Brandegee; Tibouchina bourgaeana Cogn.; Tibouchina longifolia (Vahl) Baill.

= Chaetogastra longifolia =

Species of flowering plant

Chaetogastra longifolia is a species of flowering plant in the family Melastomataceae, native to Mexico through the Caribbean to northern South America. It has many synonyms, including Tibouchina longifolia. It was first described in 1797 by Martin Vahl as Rhexia longifolia.

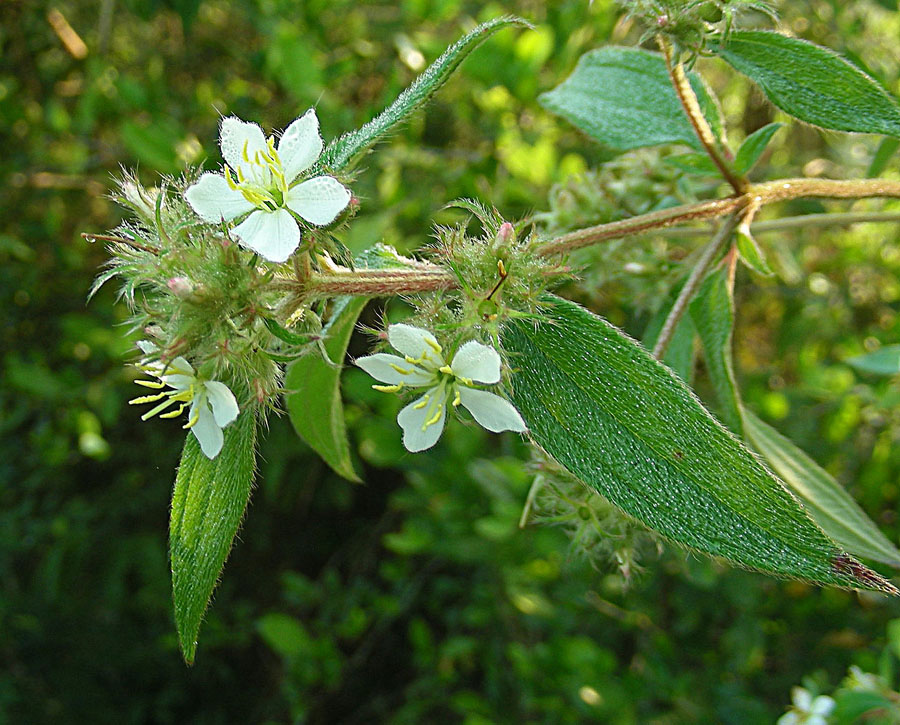
Closeup of flowers and leaves
