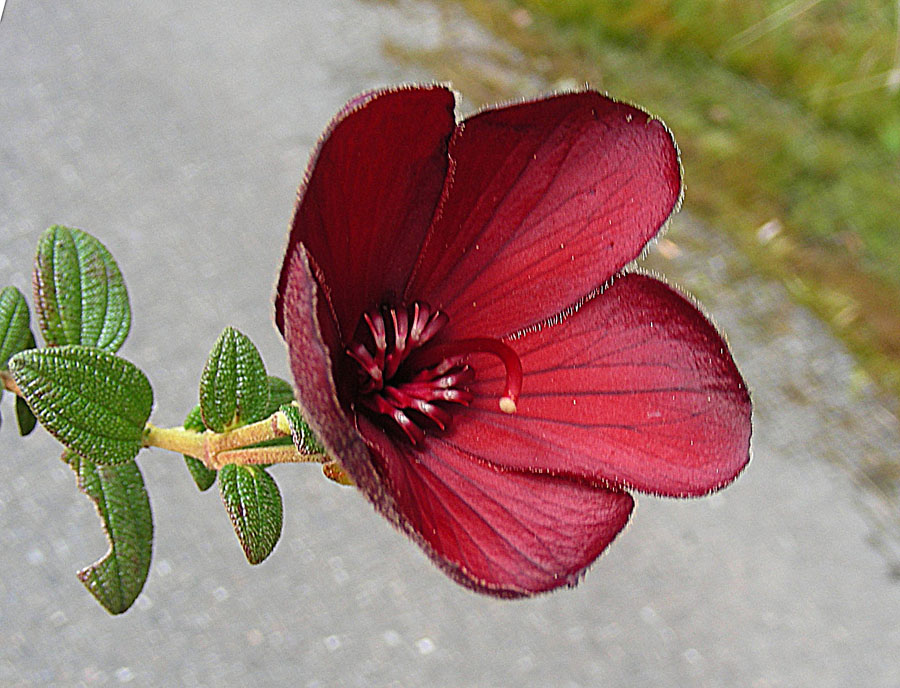

Scientific classification
- Kingdom: Plantae
- Clade: Tracheophytes
- Clade: Angiosperms
- Clade: Eudicots
- Clade: Rosids
- Order: Myrtales
- Family: Melastomataceae
- Genus: Chaetogastra
- Species: C. grossa

Binomial name
- Chaetogastra grossa (L.f.) P.J.F.Guim. & Michelang.

Synonyms
- Chaetogastra lindeniana Planch.; Chaetogastra muricata (Bonpl.) DC.; Chaetogastra reticulata (Bonpl.) DC.; Melastoma grossum L.f.; Purpurella grossa (L.f.) Triana; Purpurella muricata (Bonpl.) Naudin; Purpurella reticulata (Bonpl.) Naudin; Rhexia muricata Bonpl.; Rhexia reticulata Bonpl.; Tibouchina grossa (L.f.) Cogn.; Tibouchina reticulata (Bonpl.) Cogn.

= Chaetogastra grossa =

Species of flowering plant

Chaetogastra grossa, synonym Tibouchina grossa, is a species in the Melastomataceae family that is native to Colombia, Ecuador and Venezuela. It is found between 2400 and 3800 meters in elevation. Also called "red princess flower" or "carmine princess flower" to differentiate it from "princess flower" which has purple blooms.

== Description ==
The plant is a small tree or shrub growing between 6 ft - 16 ft tall. The leaves are dark green and fuzzy with pronounced parallel veining. It blooms year-round and the bright to dark red flowers are about 3 in. It prefers cooler climates, but is not frost tolerant, and full to partial-sun. It is uncommon in cultivation.

The petiole is 5 to 10 mm in length; Leaf blade, thick, elliptical or ovate-elliptical, 5 to 6 cm long by 1 to 3 cm wide; acute at apex, obtuse or rounded at base. Inflorescences paucifloras terminal in branches and twigs. Brown fruit, in capsule, with several tiny seeds.
