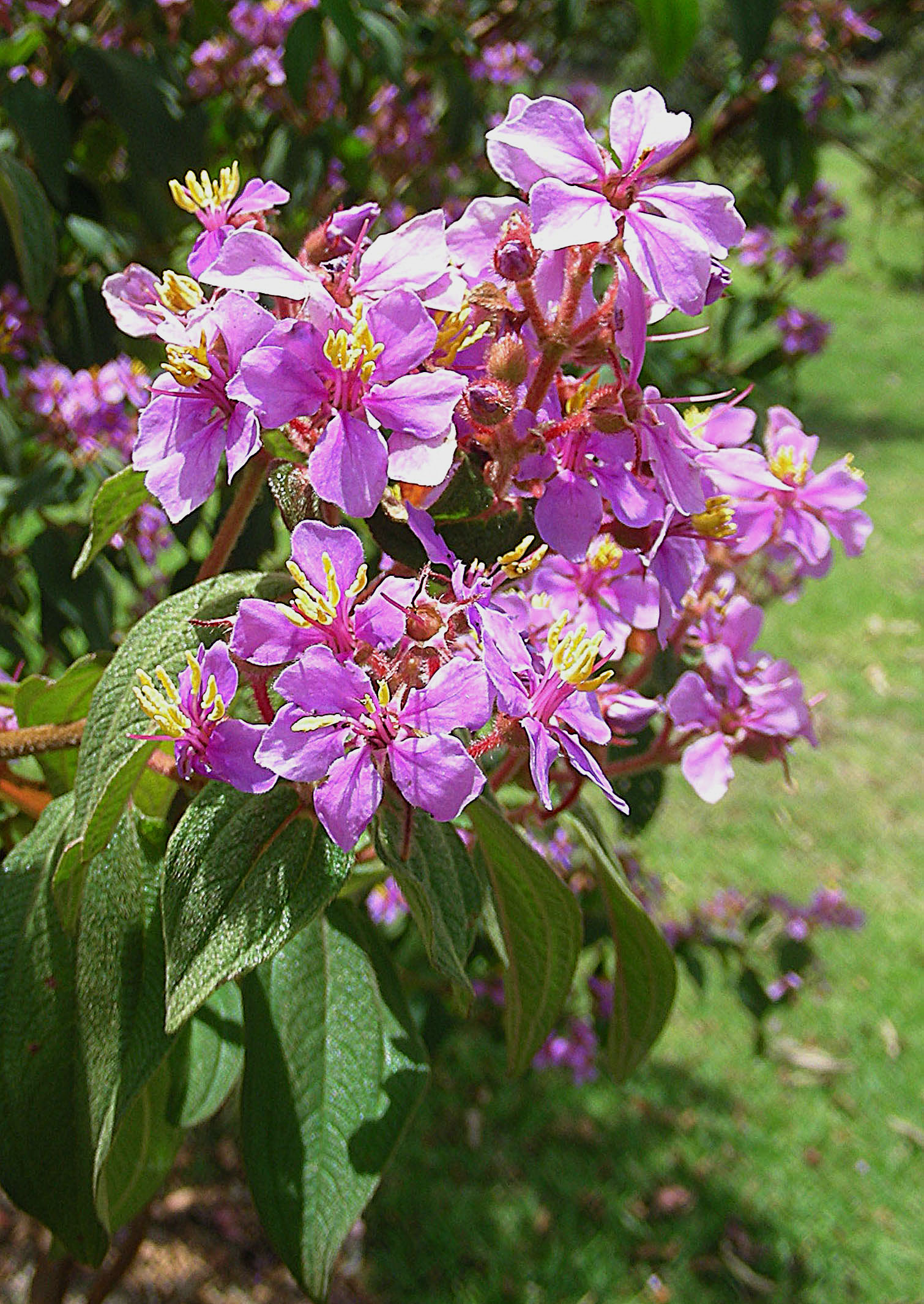

Scientific classification
- Kingdom: Plantae
- Clade: Tracheophytes
- Clade: Angiosperms
- Clade: Eudicots
- Clade: Rosids
- Order: Myrtales
- Family: Melastomataceae
- Genus: Chaetogastra
- Species: C. mollis

Binomial name
- Chaetogastra mollis (Bonpl.) DC.)

Synonyms
- Micranthella candollei Naudin; Pleroma exappendiculatum Triana; Rhexia mollis Bonpl.; Tibouchina inappendiculata Baill.; Tibouchina mollis (Bonpl.) Cogn.

= Chaetogastra mollis =

Species of flowering plant

Chaetogastra mollis is a species of flowering plant in the family Melastomataceae, native to western South America (Colombia, Ecuador and Peru). It was first described by Aimé Bonpland as Rhexia mollis in part of Monographia Melastomacearum, volume 2, published in 1808. Its synonyms include Tibouchina mollis.

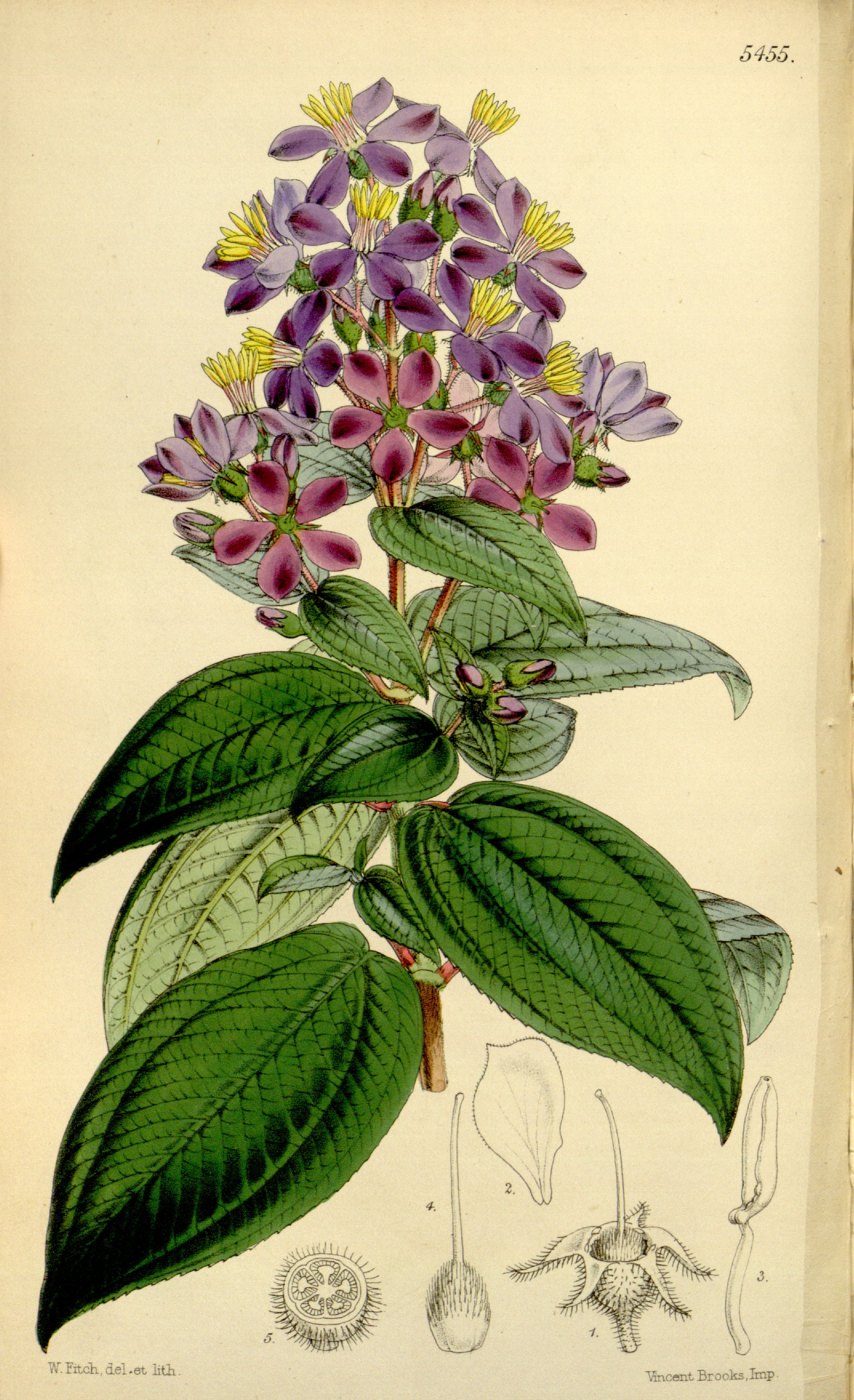
Botanical illustration (as Micranthella candollei)
