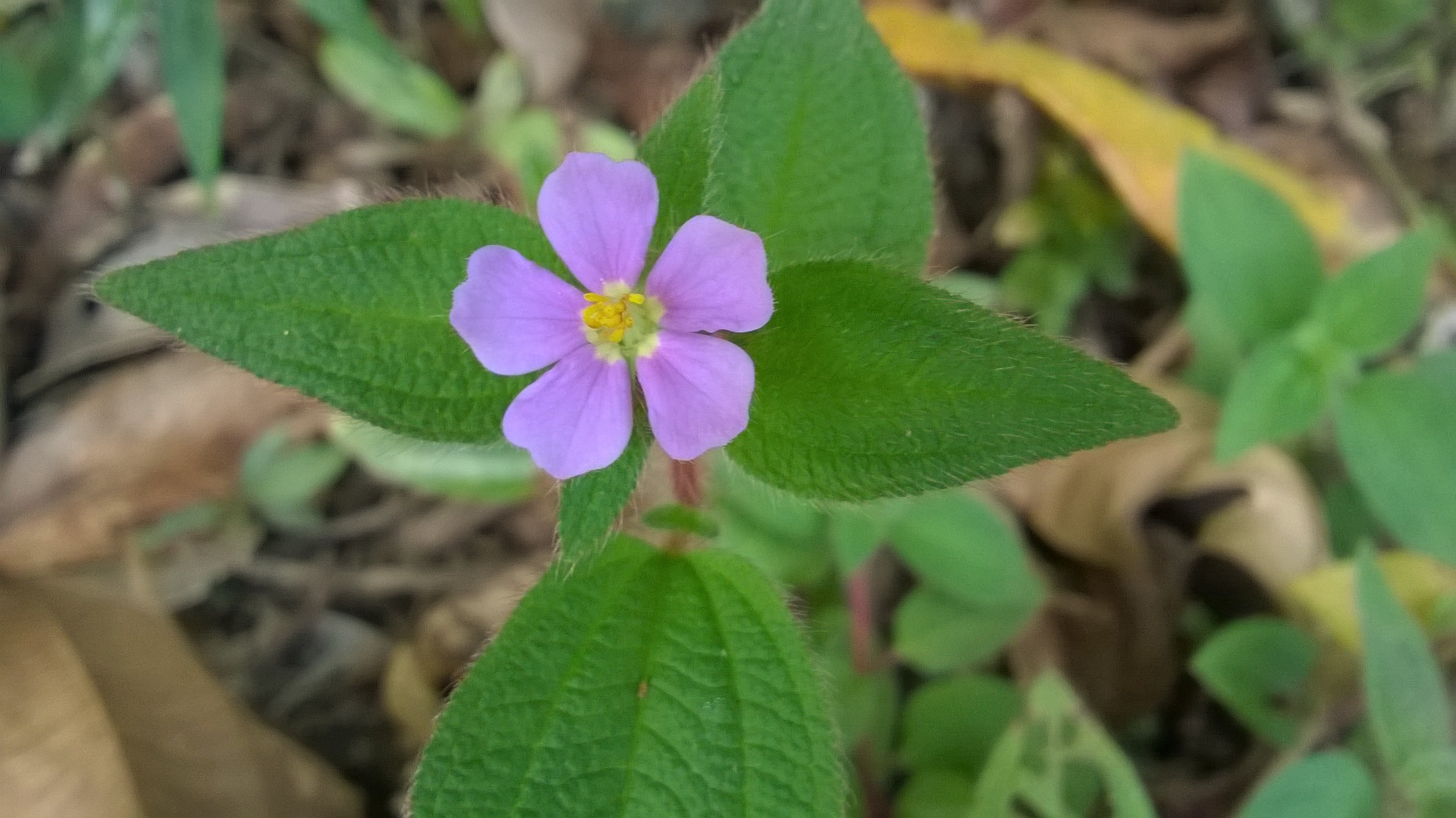
- In pastureland, Santa Catarina state, Brazil

Scientific classification
- Kingdom: Plantae
- Clade: Tracheophytes
- Clade: Angiosperms
- Clade: Eudicots
- Clade: Rosids
- Order: Myrtales
- Family: Melastomataceae
- Genus: Chaetogastra
- Species: C. clinopodifolia

Binomial name
- Chaetogastra clinopodifolia DC.

Synonyms
- Micranthella clinopodifolia (DC.) Naudin; Pleroma clinopodifolium (DC.) Triana; Tibouchina clinopodifolia (DC.) Cogn.

= Chaetogastra clinopodifolia =

Species of flowering plant

Chaetogastra clinopodifolia is a species of flowering plant in the family Melastomataceae, native to south and southeastern Brazil. It was first described by Augustin de Candolle in 1828. One of its synonyms is Tibouchina clinopodifolia.
