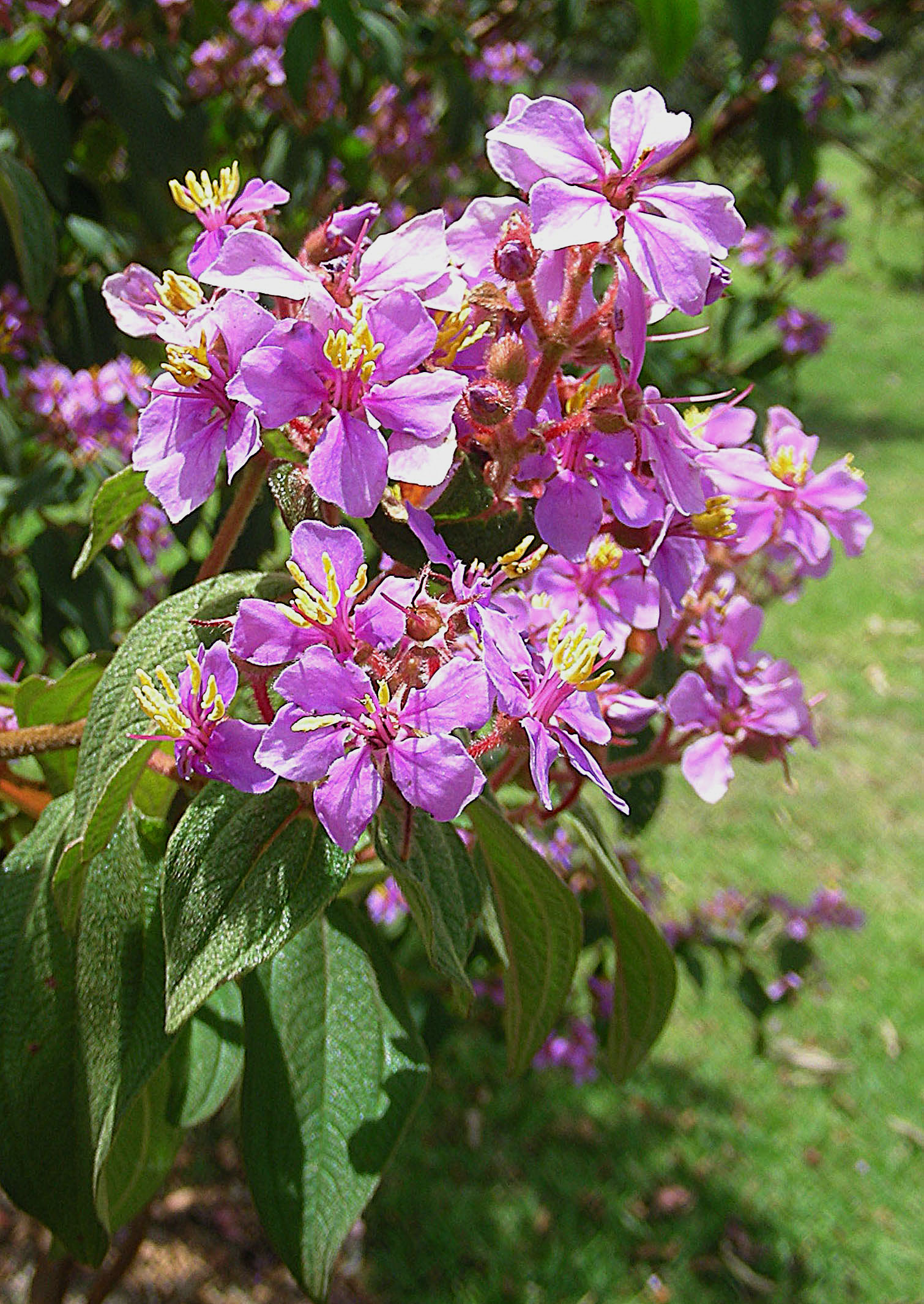
- Chaetogastra mollis (syn. Tibouchina mollis)

Scientific classification
- Kingdom: Plantae
- Clade: Tracheophytes
- Clade: Angiosperms
- Clade: Eudicots
- Clade: Rosids
- Order: Myrtales
- Family: Melastomataceae
- Genus: Chaetogastra; DC.

Species
- See text.

Synonyms
- Hephestionia Naudin; Micranthella Naudin; Oreocosmus Naudin; Purpurella Naudin

= Chaetogastra =

Genus of flowering plants

Chaetogastra is a genus of flowering plants belonging to the family Melastomataceae. Its native range is South America and North America. It contains around 115 species.

== Description ==
Species of Chaetogastra are herbs, subshrubs, shrubs or small trees. Their leaves are opposite and have petioles. The inflorescence is a terminal panicle or some modification of one. The flowers are hypogynous, with a bell-shaped hypanthium (base of the flower), usually very hairy (pubescent) on the outside. There are four or five petals, usually dark lilac to purple, more rarely white, yellow or deep red. There are eight or ten stamens which may be all the same or in two series of different sizes. The connectives at the base of the anthers are prolonged, with two ventral lobes. The numerous seeds are borne in a dry, semiwoody capsule, and are more-or-less spiral (cochleate) in shape.

== Taxonomy ==
The genus Chaetogastra was established by Augustin de Candolle in 1828. In 1885, in his treatment for Flora brasiliensis, Alfred Cogniaux used a broad concept of the genus Tibouchina, transferring into it species at that time placed in many other genera, including Chaetogastra. This broad concept was generally adopted subsequently, and around 470 taxa were at one time or another assigned to Tibouchina, including those placed in Chaetogastra. A phylogenetic analysis in 2013 based on molecular data (2 plastid and 1 nuclear regions) showed that the traditional circumscription of Tibouchina was paraphyletic. Four major clades were resolved within the genus, which were supported by morphological, molecular and geographic evidence. A further molecular phylogenetic study in 2019 used the same molecular markers but included more species. It reached the same conclusion: the original broadly circumscribed Tibouchina consisted of four monophyletic clades. The authors proposed a split into four genera: a more narrowly circumscribed Tibouchina, two re-established genera Pleroma and Chaetogastra, and a new genus, Andesanthus. The part of their maximum likelihood cladogram which includes former Tibouchina species is as follows, using their genus names and with shading added to show the original broadly circumscribed Tibouchina s.l. (The relationship between Chaetogastra and the genus Brachyotum differed between analyses.)

- - - Tibouchina s.s.
    - Pleroma
  - - clade 1 (other genera)
    - clade 2 (other genera)
    - - Andesanthus
      - Chaetogastra / Brachyotum

Chaetogastra is shown either to be sister to Andesanthus or to be part of a clade combining Chaetogastra and Brachyotum. The authors preferred to keep these two genera separate, as they were in their Bayesian inference analysis.

=== Species ===
As of May 2022, Plants of the World Online accepted the following species:

- Chaetogastra adenophora (Cogn.) P.J.F.Guim. & Michelang.
- Chaetogastra alata P.J.F.Guim. & Michelang.
- Chaetogastra almedae (Todzia) P.J.F.Guim. & Michelang.
- Chaetogastra anderssonii (Wurdack) P.J.F.Guim. & Michelang.
- Chaetogastra andreana (Cogn.) P.J.F.Guim. & Michelang.
- Chaetogastra araneicalyx (de Santiago) P.J.F.Guim. & Michelang.
- Chaetogastra arthrostemmoides (Cogn.) P.J.F.Guim. & Michelang.
- Chaetogastra asperifolia (Cogn.) P.J.F.Guim. & Michelang.
- Chaetogastra aurea (Cogn.) P.J.F.Guim. & Michelang.
- Chaetogastra brittoniana (Cogn.) P.J.F.Guim. & Michelang.
- Chaetogastra campii (Wurdack) P.J.F.Guim. & Michelang.
- Chaetogastra capitata (Naudin) P.J.F.Guim. & Michelang.
- Chaetogastra cerastifolia (Naudin) P.J.F.Guim. & Michelang.
- Chaetogastra chamaecistus Griseb.
- Chaetogastra chironioides Griseb.
- Chaetogastra ciliaris (Vent.) DC.
- Chaetogastra cisplatensis (Cogn.) P.J.F.Guim. & Michelang.
- Chaetogastra cistoides Griseb.
- Chaetogastra citrina (Naudin) P.J.F.Guim. & Michelang.
- Chaetogastra clinopodifolia DC.
- Chaetogastra confertiflora (Naudin) P.J.F.Guim. & Michelang.
- Chaetogastra congestiflora (Todzia) P.J.F.Guim. & Michelang.
- Chaetogastra connata (Gleason ex Todzia) P.J.F.Guim. & Michelang.
- Chaetogastra cordeiroi F.S.Mey. & R.Goldenb.
- Chaetogastra cornuta (Gleason) P.J.F.Guim. & Michelang.
- Chaetogastra crassifolia F.S.Mey. & R.Goldenb.
- Chaetogastra cristaensis F.S.Mey. & R.Goldenb.
- Chaetogastra debilis Cham.
- Chaetogastra decora (Gleason) P.J.F.Guim. & Michelang.
- Chaetogastra dimorphylla (Gleason) P.J.F.Guim. & Michelang.
- Chaetogastra durangensis (Standl.) P.J.F.Guim. & Michelang.
- Chaetogastra echinata (Ruiz & Pav.) DC.
- Chaetogastra erioclada (Triana) P.J.F.Guim. & Michelang.
- Chaetogastra excoriata (Cogn.) P.J.F.Guim. & Michelang.
- Chaetogastra ferrariana (Cogn.) P.J.F.Guim. & Michelang.
- Chaetogastra fulvipilis (Cogn.) P.J.F.Guim. & Michelang.
- Chaetogastra galeottiana (Naudin) P.J.F.Guim. & Michelang.
- Chaetogastra gayana (Naudin) P.J.F.Guim. & Michelang.
- Chaetogastra geitneriana Schltdl.
- Chaetogastra gracilis (Bonpl.) DC.
- Chaetogastra grossa (L.f.) P.J.F.Guim. & Michelang.
- Chaetogastra hassleri (Cogn.) P.J.F.Guim. & Michelang.
- Chaetogastra herbacea (DC.) P.J.F.Guim. & Michelang.
- Chaetogastra herincquiana (Cogn.) P.J.F.Guim. & Michelang.
- Chaetogastra herzogii (Cogn.) P.J.F.Guim. & Michelang.
- Chaetogastra hieracioides DC.
- Chaetogastra hintonii (Gleason ex Todzia) P.J.F.Guim. & Michelang.
- Chaetogastra hutchisonii (Wurdack) P.J.F.Guim. & Michelang.
- Chaetogastra incarum (Gleason) P.J.F.Guim. & Michelang.
- Chaetogastra kingii (Wurdack) P.J.F.Guim. & Michelang.
- Chaetogastra kunhardtii (Gleason) P.J.F.Guim. & Michelang.
- Chaetogastra laevis (Cogn.) P.J.F.Guim. & Michelang.
- Chaetogastra lancifolia (Wurdack) P.J.F.Guim. & Michelang.
- Chaetogastra latebracteolata (Paul G.Wilson) P.J.F.Guim. & Michelang.
- Chaetogastra latifolia (Naudin) P.J.F.Guim. & Michelang.
- Chaetogastra laxa (Desr.) P.J.F.Guim. & Michelang.
- Chaetogastra longifolia (Vahl) DC.
- Chaetogastra longipilosa (Cogn.) P.J.F.Guim. & Michelang.
- Chaetogastra longisepala (Cogn.) P.J.F.Guim. & Michelang.
- Chaetogastra longistyla (Cogn.) P.J.F.Guim. & Michelang.
- Chaetogastra macvaughii (Todzia) P.J.F.Guim. & Michelang.
- Chaetogastra mariae (Wurdack) P.J.F.Guim. & Michelang.
- Chaetogastra membranifolia (Cogn.) P.J.F.Guim. & Michelang.
- Chaetogastra minor (Cogn.) P.J.F.Guim. & Michelang.
- Chaetogastra mollis (DC.) DC.
- Chaetogastra monticola (Naudin) P.J.F.Guim. & Michelang.
- Chaetogastra nanifolia (Todzia) P.J.F.Guim. & Michelang.
- Chaetogastra naudiniana Decne.
- Chaetogastra nitida (Graham) P.J.F.Guim. & Michelang.
- Chaetogastra obtusifolia (Cogn.) P.J.F.Guim. & Michelang.
- Chaetogastra oligantha (Gleason) P.J.F.Guim. & Michelang.
- Chaetogastra orbignyana (Naudin) P.J.F.Guim. & Michelang.
- Chaetogastra oroensis (Gleason) P.J.F.Guim. & Michelang.
- Chaetogastra panicularis Naudin
- Chaetogastra paratropica (Griseb.) P.J.F.Guim. & Michelang.
- Chaetogastra parviflora (Cogn.) P.J.F.Guim. & Michelang.
- Chaetogastra patens (Todzia) P.J.F.Guim. & Michelang.
- Chaetogastra pauciflora P.J.F.Guim. & Michelang.
- Chaetogastra pendula (Cogn.) P.J.F.Guim. & Michelang.
- Chaetogastra pentamera (Ule) P.J.F.Guim. & Michelang.
- Chaetogastra pleromoides (Naudin) P.J.F.Guim. & Michelang.
- Chaetogastra pulcherrima (Gleason) P.J.F.Guim. & Michelang.
- Chaetogastra purpurascens (Cogn.) P.J.F.Guim. & Michelang.
- Chaetogastra purpusii (Brandegee) P.J.F.Guim. & Michelang.
- Chaetogastra repens (Wurdack) P.J.F.Guim. & Michelang.
- Chaetogastra rhynchantherifolia (Cogn.) P.J.F.Guim. & Michelang.
- Chaetogastra riograndensis F.S.Mey.
- Chaetogastra rojasii (Cogn.) P.J.F.Guim. & Michelang.
- Chaetogastra roseotincta (Todzia) P.J.F.Guim. & Michelang.
- Chaetogastra rufipilis (Schltdl.) Walp.
- Chaetogastra rupestris (Cogn.) P.J.F.Guim. & Michelang.
- Chaetogastra rusbyi (Cogn.) P.J.F.Guim. & Michelang.
- Chaetogastra sandiensis (Wurdack) P.J.F.Guim. & Michelang.
- Chaetogastra saxicola (F.S.Mey., P.J.F.Guim. & R.Goldenb.) P.J.F.Guim. & Michelang.
- Chaetogastra saxosa (Gleason) P.J.F.Guim. & Michelang.
- Chaetogastra scabriuscula (Schltdl.) P.J.F.Guim. & Michelang.
- Chaetogastra schiedeana (Schltdl. & Cham.) Walp.
- Chaetogastra sebastianopolitana (Raddi) P.J.F.Guim. & Michelang.
- Chaetogastra sericea (de Santiago) P.J.F.Guim. & Michelang.
- Chaetogastra simplicicaulis (Naudin) P.J.F.Guim. & Michelang.
- Chaetogastra sinaloensis (Todzia) P.J.F.Guim. & Michelang.
- Chaetogastra solmsii (Cogn.) P.J.F.Guim. & Michelang.
- Chaetogastra stenopetala (Cogn.) P.J.F.Guim. & Michelang.
- Chaetogastra stenophylla (Cogn.) P.J.F.Guim. & Michelang.
- Chaetogastra tetrapetala (Cogn.) P.J.F.Guim. & Michelang.
- Chaetogastra thulia (Todzia) P.J.F.Guim. & Michelang.
- Chaetogastra tortuosa (Bonpl.) DC.
- Chaetogastra triflora (Gleason) P.J.F.Guim. & Michelang.
- Chaetogastra trinitensis (Cogn.) P.J.F.Guim. & Michelang.
- Chaetogastra urbanii (Cogn.) P.J.F.Guim. & Michelang.
- Chaetogastra venosa (Gleason) P.J.F.Guim. & Michelang.
- Chaetogastra versicolor (Lindl.) P.J.F.Guim. & Michelang.
- Chaetogastra violacea (Cogn.) P.J.F.Guim. & Michelang.
- Chaetogastra wasshausenii (Wurdack) P.J.F.Guim. & Michelang.
- Chaetogastra weberbaueri (Cogn.) P.J.F.Guim. & Michelang.

== Distribution and habitat ==
The species of Chaetogastra are native from Mexico through Central America and the West Indies into the Andes of Venezuela, Colombia, Ecuador, Peru, Bolivia and Argentina. They are also found in eastern Brazil. The Andes are the centre of diversity. Most are found in cloud forests above 1,000 m elevation, although some herbaceous species are found in open areas above 100 m.
