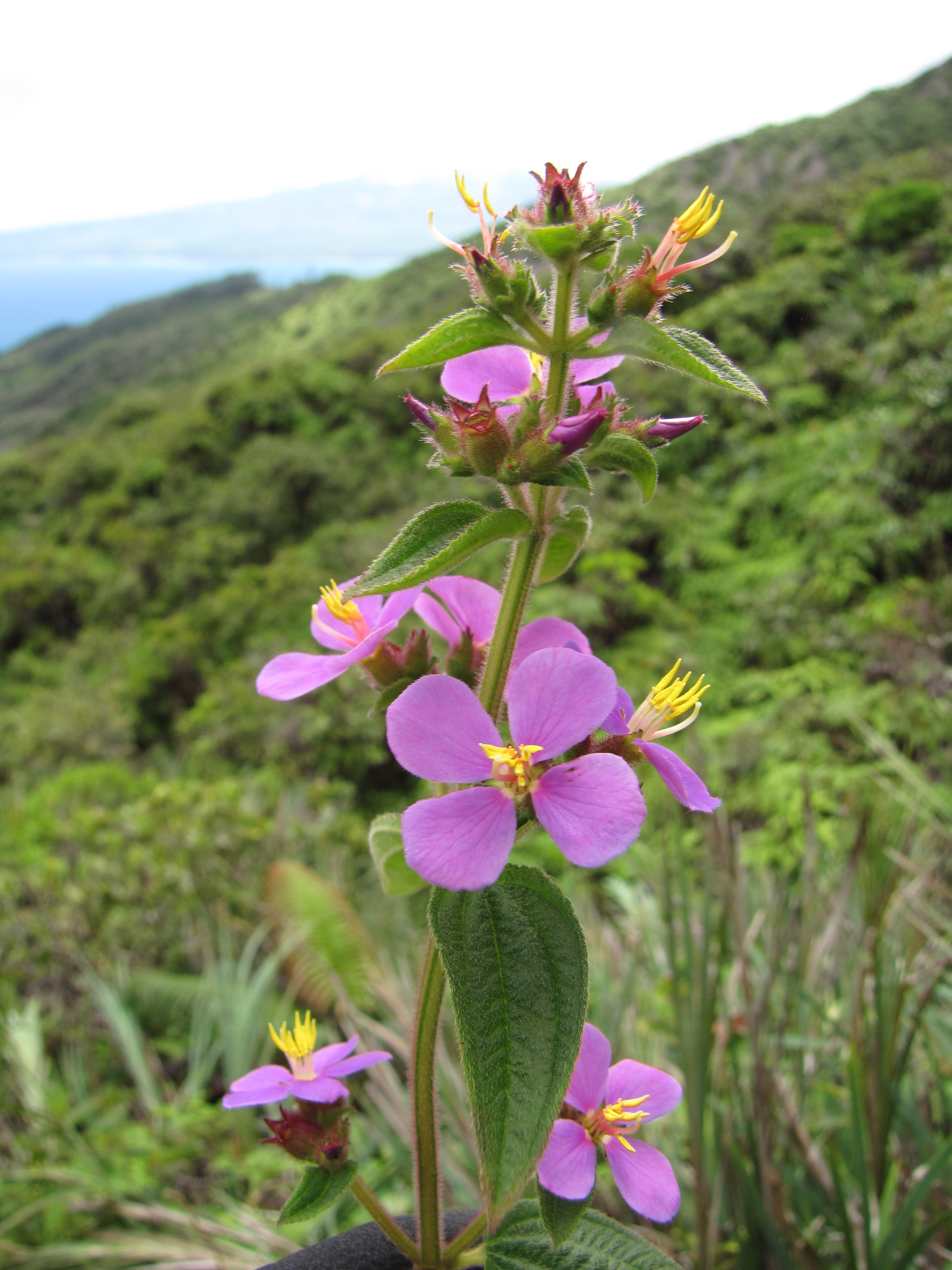
- Naturalized in Hawaii

Scientific classification
- Kingdom: Plantae
- Clade: Tracheophytes
- Clade: Angiosperms
- Clade: Eudicots
- Clade: Rosids
- Order: Myrtales
- Family: Melastomataceae
- Genus: Chaetogastra
- Species: C. herbacea

Binomial name
- Chaetogastra herbacea (DC.) P.J.F.Guim. & Michelang.

Synonyms
- Arthrostemma herbaceum DC.; Arthrostemma hirsutissimum DC.; Pterolepis herbacea (DC.) Triana; Rhexia herbacea Schrank & Mart. ex DC.; Tibouchina herbacea (DC.) Cogn.

= Chaetogastra herbacea =

Species of flowering plant

Chaetogastra herbacea, synonym Tibouchina herbacea, is a species of flowering plant in the family Melastomataceae, native to southern Brazil and north-eastern Argentina. It has been introduced to Hawaii. It was first described, as Arthrostemma herbaceum, by Augustin de Candolle in 1828.

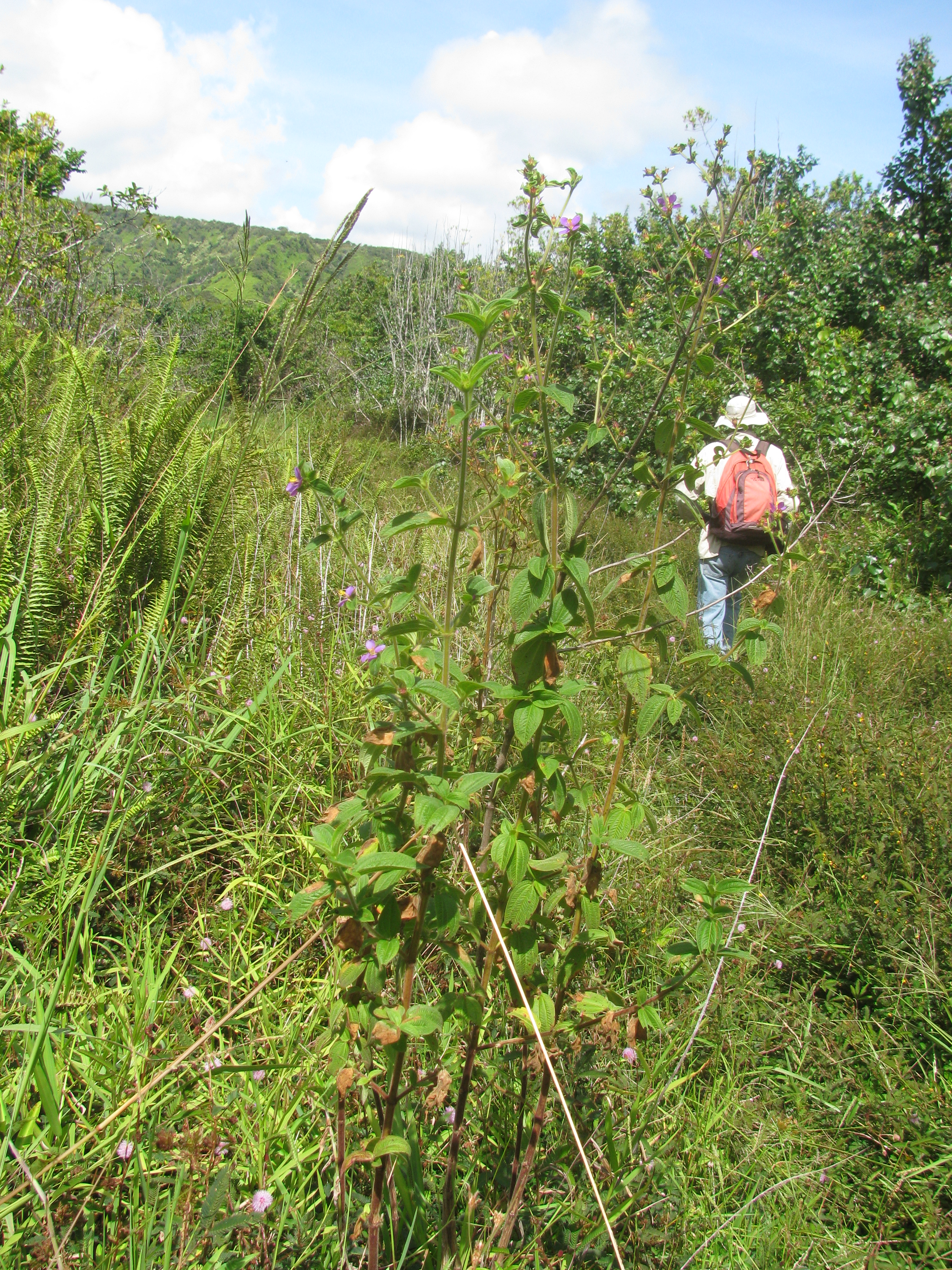
Naturalized in Hawaii

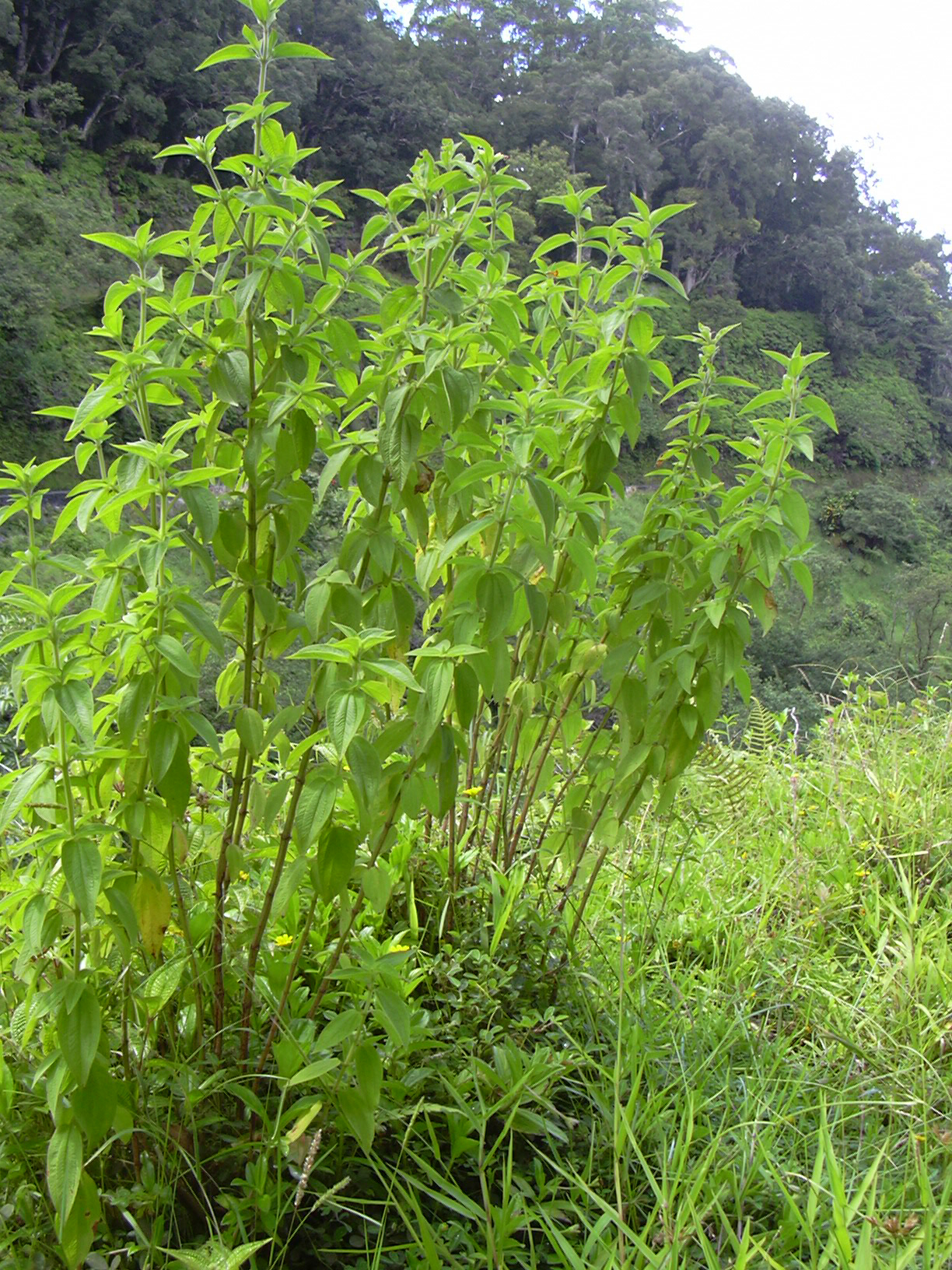
Habit

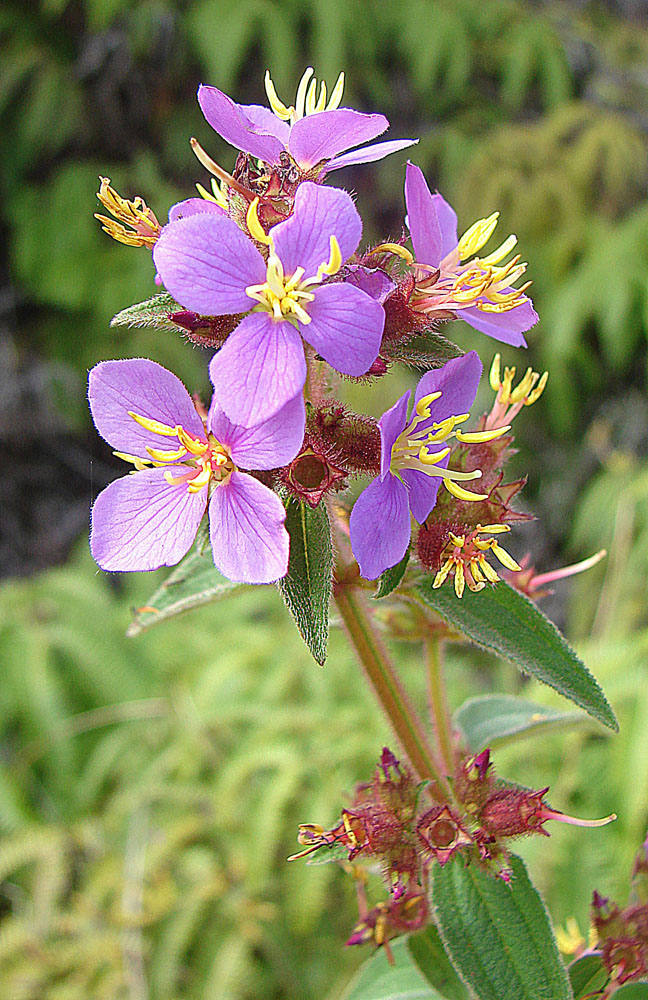
Flowers
