= Chaetogastra campii =

Conservation status
- Vulnerable (IUCN 3.1)

Scientific classification
- Kingdom: Plantae
- Clade: Tracheophytes
- Clade: Angiosperms
- Clade: Eudicots
- Clade: Rosids
- Order: Myrtales
- Family: Melastomataceae
- Genus: Chaetogastra
- Species: C. campii

Binomial name
- Chaetogastra campii (Wurdack) P.J.F.Guim. & Michelang.

Synonyms
- Tibouchina campii Wurdack

Species of flowering plant

Chaetogastra campii, synonym Tibouchina campii, is a species of plant in the family Melastomataceae. It is native to Ecuador.
