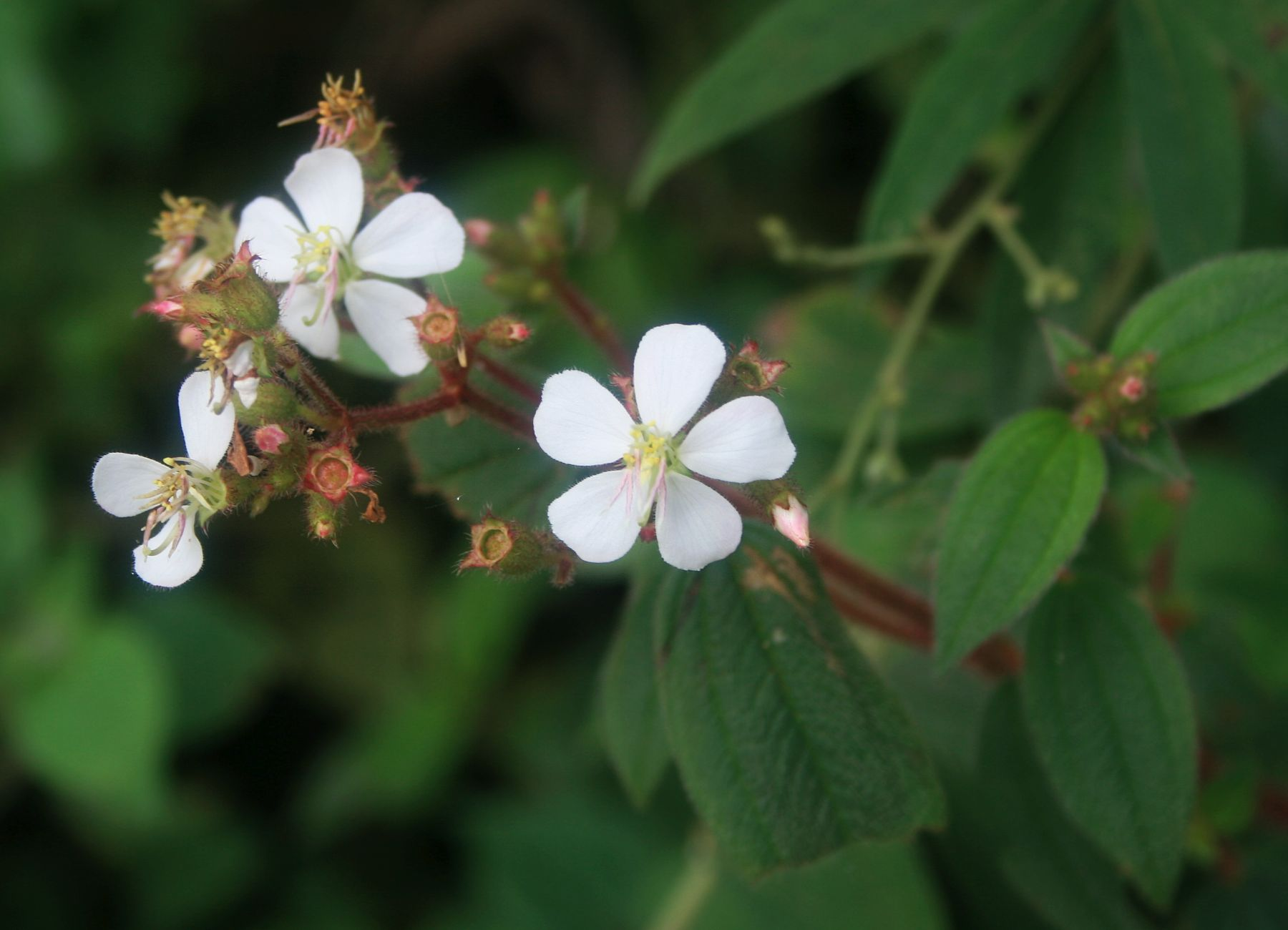
- In Colombia

Scientific classification
- Kingdom: Plantae
- Clade: Tracheophytes
- Clade: Angiosperms
- Clade: Eudicots
- Clade: Rosids
- Order: Myrtales
- Family: Melastomataceae
- Genus: Chaetogastra
- Species: C. ciliaris

Binomial name
- Chaetogastra ciliaris (Vent.) DC.

Synonyms
- Meriania ciliaris Vent.; Micranthella ciliaris (Vent.) Naudin; Pleroma ciliare (Vent.) Triana; Tibouchina ciliaris (Vent.) Cogn.

= Chaetogastra ciliaris =

Species of flowering plant

Chaetogastra ciliaris is a species of flowering plant in the family Melastomataceae, native to Colombia, Costa Rica and Ecuador. It was first described as Meriania ciliaris by Étienne Ventenat in 1807. Its synonyms include Tibouchina ciliaris.
