= Princess flower =

Princess flower is a common name for several plants and may refer to:

- Pleroma granulosum (syn. Tibouchina granulosa)
- Pleroma semidecandrum (syn. Tibouchina semidecandra)
- Pleroma urvilleanum (syn. Tibouchina urvilleana)
