= Pau Brasil National Park =

National park in Bahia, Brazil

- Parque Nacional do Pau Brasil
- IUCN category II (national park)
- Location within Brazil
- Nearest city: Porto Seguro, Bahia
- Coordinates: 16°29′51″S 39°16′52″W
- Designation: National park
- Created: 20 April 1999
- Administrator: ICMBio

Pau Brasil National Park (Portuguese: Parque Nacional do Pau Brasil) is a national park in the state of Bahia, Brazil. It preserves a remnant of the Atlantic Forest biome.

== Location ==
The Pau Brasil National Park is in the Atlantic Forest biome. It covers an area of 19,027 hectares (47,020 acres). It was created by decree on 20 April 1999, with a modified decree on 11 June 2010, and is administered by the Chico Mendes Institute for Biodiversity Conservation. It became part of the Central Atlantic Forest Ecological Corridor, created in 2002. It lies in the municipality of Porto Seguro, Bahia. The park lies between the Frades River (Rio dos Frades) and Buranhém River. The terrain is a relatively flat coastal plain with elevations of 100 to 150 metres (330 to 490 ft) cut by many deep gullies carrying streams that drain the area. Most of the streams originate in the conservation unit.

Average annual rainfall is 1,389 millimetres (54.7 in). Temperatures range from 21 to 26 °C (70 to 79 °F) with an average of 23 °C (73 °F). The park contains a remnant of dense lowland rainforest of the Atlantic Forest biome including Pau-brasil (Caesalpinia echinata) trees, as well as regenerating areas that have been disturbed by human activity. There are 71 endemic plant species, including Protium icicariba, Caryocar edule, Couepia belemii, Arapatiella psilophylla, Byrsonima alvimii, Tibouchina elegans, Eugenia flamingensis, Manilkara multifida.

== Conservation ==
The park is classed as IUCN protected area category II (national park). The park's basic objective is preservation of natural ecosystems of great ecological relevance and scenic beauty and enabling scientific research, environmental education, outdoor recreation and ecological tourism. Protected species in the park include jaguar (Panthera onca), cougar (Puma concolor), harpy eagle (Harpia harpyja), red-billed curassow (Crax blumenbachii), Atlantic black-breasted woodpecker (Celeus tinnunculus), black-headed berryeater (Carpornis melanocephala), ochre-marked parakeet (Pyrrhura cruentata), the fish Mimagoniates sylvicola and Rachoviscus graciliceps and the Hercules beetle (Dynastes hercules).

== Sources ==
- Lamas, Ivana Reis; Crepaldi, Maria Otávia; Mesquita, Carlos Alberto Bernardo (2015), Uma Rede no Corredor (PDF) (in Portuguese), Conservação Internacional (CI-Brasil), ISBN 978-85-98830-28-5
- Parna do Pau Brasil (in Portuguese), Chico Mendes Institute for Biodiversity Conservation, archived from the original on 2016-03-03
- Unidade de Conservação: Parque Nacional Pau Brasil (in Portuguese), MMA: Ministério do Meio Ambiente
