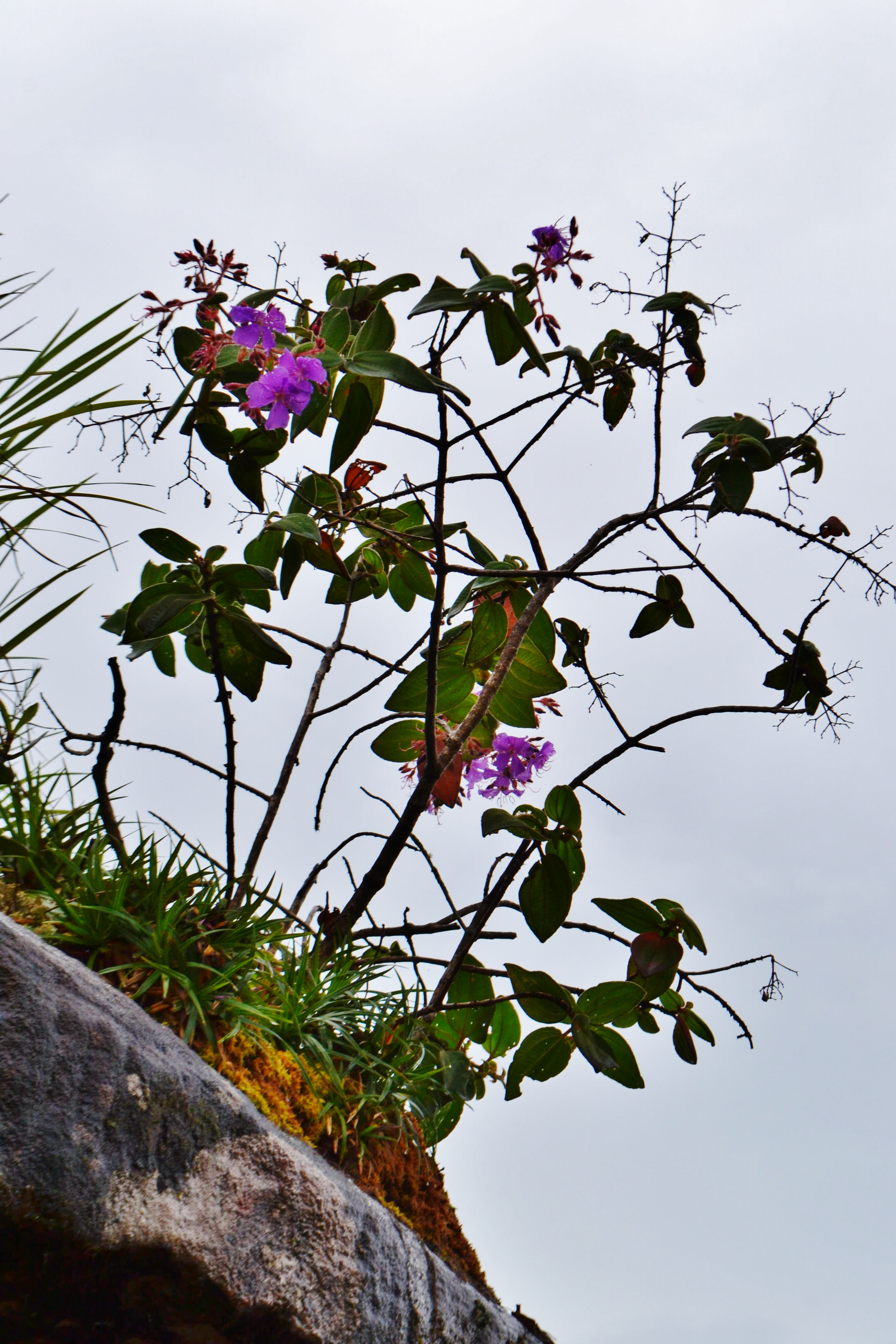

Scientific classification
- Kingdom: Plantae
- Clade: Embryophytes
- Clade: Tracheophytes
- Clade: Spermatophytes
- Clade: Angiosperms
- Clade: Eudicots
- Clade: Rosids
- Order: Myrtales
- Family: Melastomataceae
- Genus: Pleroma
- Species: P. pereirae

Binomial name
- Pleroma pereirae (Brade & Markgr.) P.J.F.Guim. & Michelang.

Synonyms
- Tibouchina pereirae Brade & Markgr.

= Pleroma pereirae =

Species of flowering plant

Pleroma pereirae is a species of flowering plant in the family Melastomataceae, native to Brazil. It was first described in 1961 as Tibouchina pereirae.

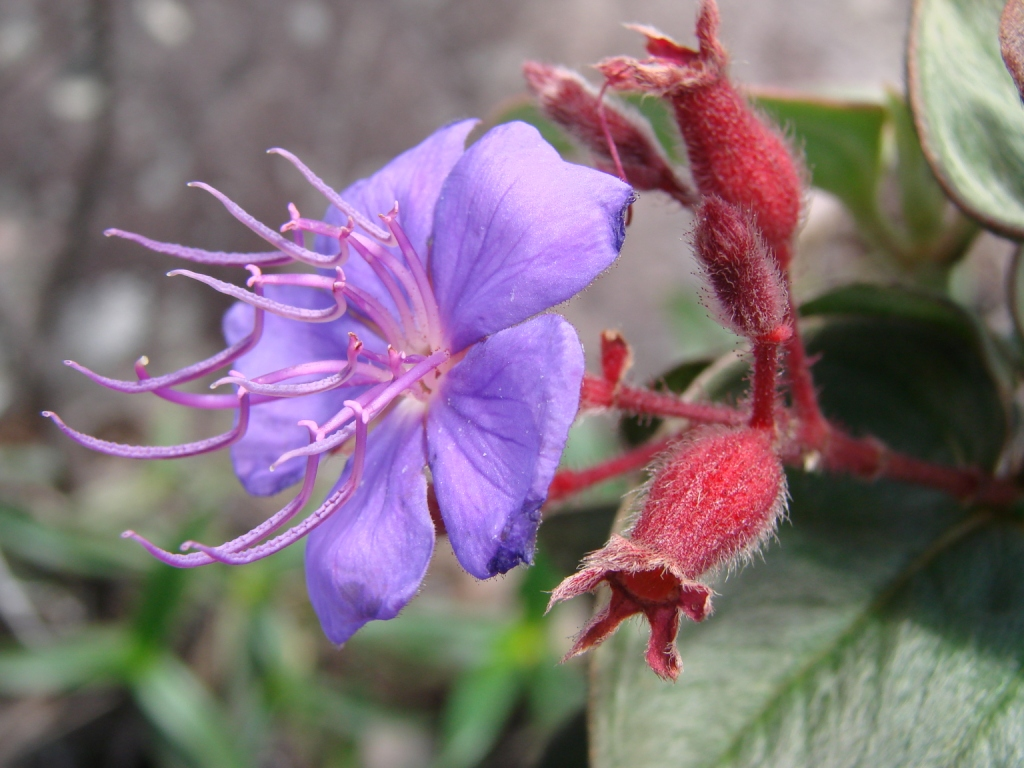
Flower
