= Pleroma ackermannii =

Scientific classification
- Kingdom: Plantae
- Clade: Tracheophytes
- Clade: Angiosperms
- Clade: Eudicots
- Clade: Rosids
- Order: Myrtales
- Family: Melastomataceae
- Genus: Pleroma
- Species: P. ackermannii

Binomial name
- Pleroma ackermannii (Brade & Markgr.) P.J.F.Guim. & Michelang.

Synonyms
- Tibouchina ackermannii Brade & Markgr.

Species of flowering plant

Pleroma ackermannii is a species of flowering plant in the family Melastomataceae, native to Brazil. It was first described in 1885 as Tibouchina ackermannii.
