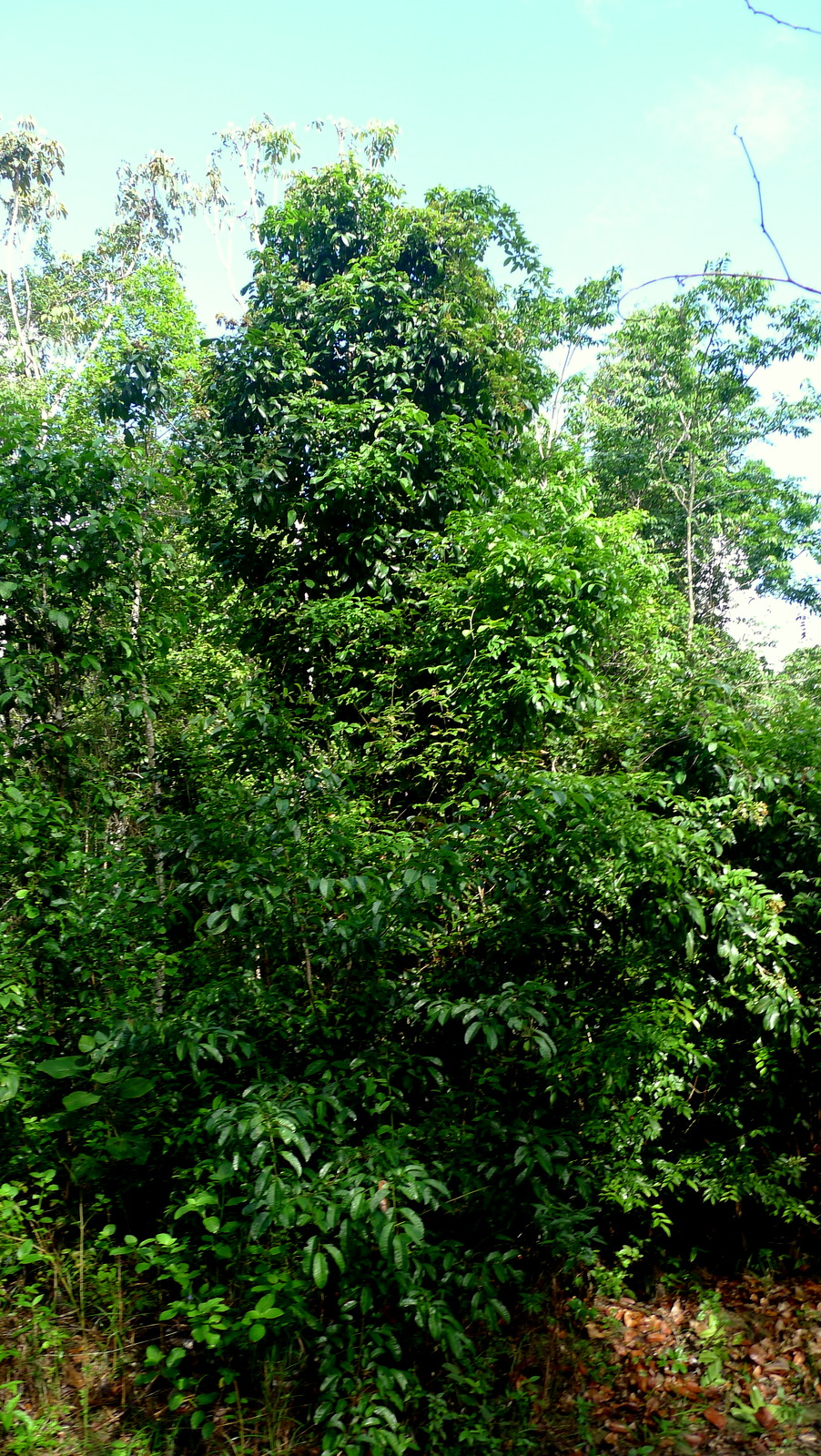
- Arapatiella psilophylla

Scientific classification
- Kingdom: Plantae
- Clade: Tracheophytes
- Clade: Angiosperms
- Clade: Eudicots
- Clade: Rosids
- Order: Fabales
- Family: Fabaceae
- Subfamily: Caesalpinioideae
- Genus: Arapatiella; Rizzini & A.Mattos (1972)

Species
- Arapatiella emarginata R.S.Cowan; Arapatiella psilophylla (Harms) R.S.Cowan

= Arapatiella =

Genus of legumes

Arapatiella is a genus of plants in the family Fabaceae. It includes two species of trees native to northeastern Brazil.

It contains the following species:

- Arapatiella emarginata R.S.Cowan – southeastern Bahia
- Arapatiella psilophylla (Harms) R.S.Cowan – Bahia
