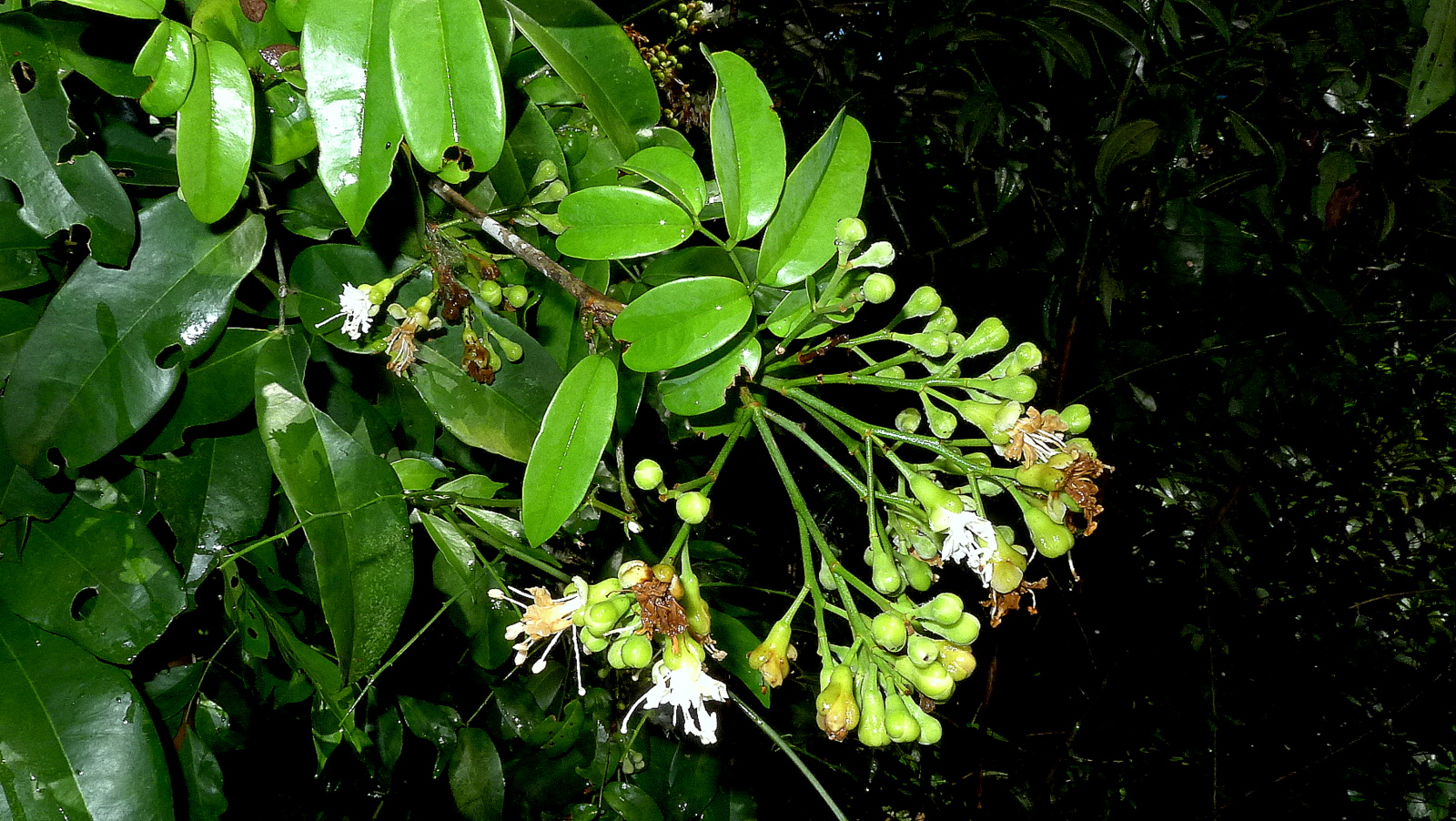

Conservation status
- Vulnerable (IUCN 2.3)

Scientific classification
- Kingdom: Plantae
- Clade: Tracheophytes
- Clade: Angiosperms
- Clade: Eudicots
- Clade: Rosids
- Order: Fabales
- Family: Fabaceae
- Subfamily: Caesalpinioideae
- Genus: Arapatiella
- Species: A. psilophylla

Binomial name
- Arapatiella psilophylla (Harms) Cowan

= Arapatiella psilophylla =

Species of legume

Arapatiella psilophylla is a species of legume in the family Fabaceae.

The plant is endemic to the Atlantic Forest ecoregion in southeastern Brazil.

== See also ==
- List of plants of Atlantic Forest vegetation of Brazil
- Pau Brasil National Park — plant is native to park.
