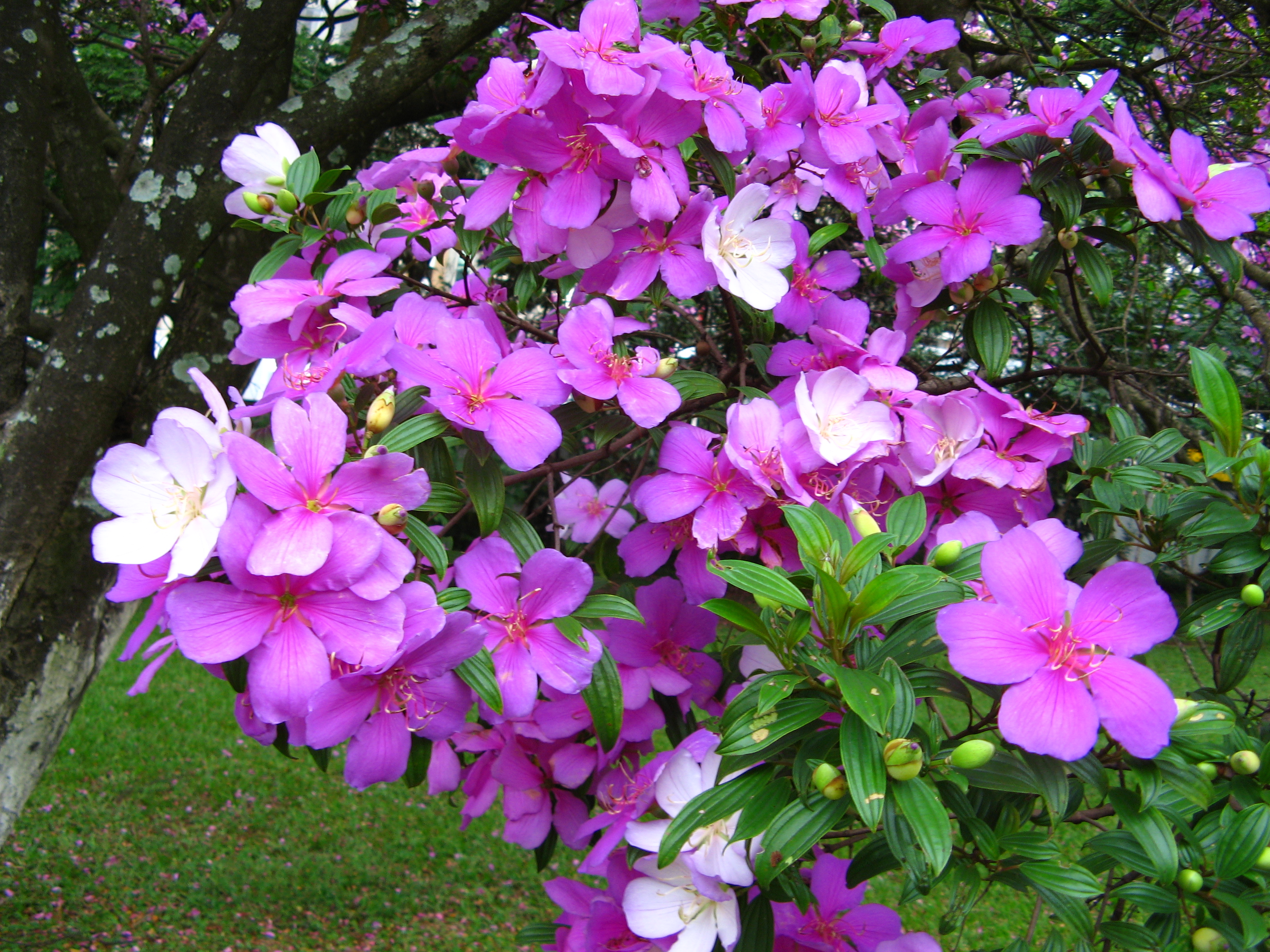
- Pleroma mutabile

Scientific classification
- Kingdom: Plantae
- Clade: Tracheophytes
- Clade: Angiosperms
- Clade: Eudicots
- Clade: Rosids
- Order: Myrtales
- Family: Melastomataceae
- Genus: Pleroma; D.Don

Species
- See text.

Synonyms
- Ancistrodesmus Naudin; Antheryta Raf.; Diplostegium D.Don; Itatiaia Ule; Lasiandra DC.; Microlepis (DC.) Miq.; Svitramia Cham.; Tibouchinopsis Markgr.

= Pleroma (plant) =

Genus of plants

Pleroma is a genus of flowering plant in the family Melastomataceae, native from Puerto Rico and the Leeward Islands to tropical South America (Bolivia, Brazil, Colombia, Ecuador, French Guiana, Peru and Venezuela).

== Description ==
Species of Pleroma are subshrubs, shrubs or trees. Their leaves are almost always opposite and petiolate, rarely sessile. The inflorescence is a terminal panicle or some modification of one. The flowers are perigynous with a bell- or urn-shaped hypanthium (base of the flower), usually externally covered with short, soft hairs (pubescent). There are usually five petals (sometimes four), purple to lilac, rarely white. The flowers have ten stamens (sometimes eight), often of two distinct sizes, with purple or pink anthers. The connective at the base of an anther is modified into a ventral bilobed appendage. The numerous seeds are contained in a dry semiwoody capsule and are spiral in shape, possibly elongated.

== Taxonomy ==
The genus Pleroma was established by David Don in 1822. He derived the name from Ancient Greek πλήρωμα, pleroma, meaning "fullness", referring to the way the seeds filled the capsule. Although Don used the genus name as a feminine noun, giving specific epithets feminine endings, the Greek word is neuter, and subsequent authors have used neuter endings (e.g. Pleroma heteromallum rather than Don's Pleroma heteromalla).

In 1885, in his treatment for Flora brasiliensis, Alfred Cogniaux used a broad concept of the genus Tibouchina, transferring into it species at that time placed in Pleroma and other genera. This broad concept was generally adopted subsequently, and around 470 taxa were at one time or another assigned to Tibouchina. A phylogenetic analysis in 2013 based on molecular data (2 plastid and 1 nuclear regions) determined that the broad circumscription of Tibouchina was paraphyletic. Four major clades were resolved within the genus which were supported by morphological, molecular and geographic evidence. A further molecular phylogenetic study in 2019 used the same molecular markers but included more species. It reached the same conclusion: the original broadly circumscribed Tibouchina consisted of four monophyletic clades. The authors proposed a split into four genera: a more narrowly circumscribed Tibouchina, two re-established genera Pleroma and Chaetogastra, and a new genus, Andesanthus. The part of their maximum likelihood cladogram which includes former Tibouchina species is as follows, using their genus names and with shading added to show the original broadly circumscribed Tibouchina s.l. (The relationship between Chaetogastra and the genus Brachyotum differed between analyses.)

- - - Tibouchina s.s.
    - Pleroma
  - - clade 1 (other genera)
    - clade 2 (other genera)
    - - Andesanthus
      - Chaetogastra / Brachyotum

Pleroma is shown to be sister to Tibouchina.

=== Species ===
As of April 2022, Plants of the World Online accepted the following 181 species:

- Pleroma ackermannii (Cogn.) P.J.F.Guim. & Michelang.
- Pleroma ademarii (P.J.F.Guim., R.Romero & Leoni) P.J.F.Guim. & Michelang.
- Pleroma aemula (Cogn.) P.J.F.Guim., A.L.F.Oliveira & R.Romero
- Pleroma alatum (Cogn.) P.J.F.Guim. & Michelang.
- Pleroma amoenum (Herzog) P.J.F.Guim. & Michelang.
- Pleroma andersregnellii P.J.F.Guim. & Michelang.
- Pleroma angustifolium (Naudin) Triana
- Pleroma apparicioi (Brade) P.J.F.Guim. & Michelang.
- Pleroma arboreum Gardner
- Pleroma arenarium (Cogn.) P.J.F.Guim. & Michelang.
- Pleroma asperius (Cham.) Triana
- Pleroma australe Triana
- Pleroma axillare (Cogn.) P.J.F.Guim. & Michelang.
- Pleroma bahiense (Wurdack) P.J.F.Guim. & Michelang.
- Pleroma bandeirae P.J.F.Guim. & Michelang.
- Pleroma barnebyanum (Wurdack) P.J.F.Guim. & Michelang.
- Pleroma benthamianum Gardner
- Pleroma bergianum (Cogn.) P.J.F.Guim. & Michelang.
- Pleroma blanchetianum (Cogn.) P.J.F.Guim. & Michelang.
- Pleroma boraceiense (Brade) P.J.F.Guim. & Justino
- Pleroma boudetii (P.J.F.Guim. & R.Goldenb.) P.J.F.Guim. & Michelang.
- Pleroma bracteolatum (J.G.Freitas, A.K.A.Santos & R.P.Oliveira) P.J.F.Guim. & Michelang.
- Pleroma brevicomosum F.S.Mey. & R.Goldenb.
- Pleroma caetanoi F.S.Mey. & R.Goldenb.
- Pleroma caissara F.S.Mey.
- Pleroma canastrense R. Romero.
- Pleroma candolleanum (DC.) Triana
- Pleroma canescens (D.Don) P.J.F.Guim. & Michelang.
- Pleroma carajasense K.Rocha, R.Goldenb. & F.S.Mey.
- Pleroma cardinale (Bonpl.) Triana
- Pleroma carvalhoi (Wurdack) P.J.F.Guim. & Michelang.
- Pleroma castellense (Brade) P.J.F.Guim. & Michelang.
- Pleroma cecilianum P.J.F.Guim. & M.F.Oliveira da Silva
- Pleroma cinereum (Cogn.) P.J.F.Guim. & Michelang.
- Pleroma claussenii (Naudin) Triana
- Pleroma clavatum (Pers.) P.J.F.Guim. & Michelang.
- Pleroma cleistoflora (Ule) P.J.F.Guim., M.F.Oliveira da Silva & Michelang.
- Pleroma clidemioides O.Berg ex Triana
- Pleroma collinum (Naudin) Triana
- Pleroma comosum (J.G.Freitas, A.K.A.Santos & R.P.Oliveira) P.J.F.Guim. & Michelang.
- Pleroma cordifolium (Cogn.) P.J.F.Guim. & Michelang.
- Pleroma costatocalyx F.S.Mey., L.Kollmann & R.Goldenb.
- Pleroma crassirame (Cogn.) P.J.F.Guim. & Michelang.
- Pleroma cristatum (Brade) P.J.F.Guim. & Michelang.
- Pleroma cryptadenum (Gleason) P.J.F.Guim. & Michelang.
- Pleroma cucullatum F.S.Mey., Fraga & R.Goldenb.
- Pleroma decemcostatum (Cogn.) P.J.F.Guim. & Michelang.
- Pleroma dendroides (Naudin) Triana
- Pleroma diffusum DC.
- Pleroma discolor (Brade) P.J.F.Guim. & Michelang.
- Pleroma divaricatum (Cogn.) P.J.F.Guim. & Michelang.
- Pleroma dubium (Cham.) P.J.F.Guim. & Michelang.
- Pleroma dusenii (Cogn.) P.J.F.Guim. & Michelang.
- Pleroma echinatum Gardner
- Pleroma edmundoi (Brade & Markgr.) P.J.F.Guim. & Michelang.
- Pleroma eichleri (Cogn.) P.J.F.Guim. & Michelang.
- Pleroma elegans Gardner
- Pleroma estrellense (Raddi) P.J.F.Guim. & Michelang.
- Pleroma ferricola A.L.F.Oliveira, R.Romero & P.J.F.Guim.
- Pleroma fissinervium (DC.) Gardner
- Pleroma floribundum (Cogn.) P.J.F.Guim. & Michelang.
- Pleroma fontanae F.S.Mey., L.Kollmann & R.Goldenb.
- Pleroma formosum (Cogn.) P.J.F.Guim. & Michelang.
- Pleroma fornograndense F.S.Mey., R.Goldenb. & L.Kollmann
- Pleroma fothergillae (DC.) Triana
- Pleroma foveolatum (Naudin) Triana
- Pleroma fragae L.Kollmann & R.Goldenb.
- Pleroma francavillanum (Cogn.) P.J.F.Guim. & Michelang.
- Pleroma gardneri (Naudin) P.J.F.Guim. & Michelang.
- Pleroma gaudichaudianum (DC.) A.Gray
- Pleroma gertii P.J.F.Guim. & Michelang.
- Pleroma glandulosum (Bonpl.) Triana
- Pleroma glutinosum (Markgr.) P.J.F.Guim. & Michelang.
- Pleroma goldenbergii (F.S.Mey., P.J.F.Guim. & Kozera) P.J.F.Guim. & Michelang.
- Pleroma granulosum (Desr.) D.Don
- Pleroma guartelaensis F.S.Mey. & R.Goldenb.
- Pleroma hatschbachii (Wurdack) P.J.F.Guim. & Michelang.
- Pleroma heteromallum (D.Don) D.Don
- Pleroma hirsutissimum (Cogn.) P.J.F.Guim. & Michelang.
- Pleroma hospitum (DC.) Triana
- Pleroma integerrimum (R.Romero & A.B.Martins) P.J.F.Guim. & Michelang.
- Pleroma itatiaiae (Wawra) P.J.F.Guim. & Michelang.
- Pleroma kleinii (Wurdack) P.J.F.Guim. & Michelang.
- Pleroma kollmanniana F.S.Mey. & R.Goldenb.
- Pleroma kuhlmannii (Brade) P.J.F.Guim. & Michelang.
- Pleroma laevicaule (Wurdack) P.J.F.Guim. & Michelang.
- Pleroma langsdorffianum (Bonpl.) Triana
- Pleroma leopoldinense L.Kollmann & R.Goldenb.
- Pleroma lhotskyanum (C.Presl) Triana
- Pleroma lilacinum (Cogn.) P.J.F.Guim. & Michelang.
- Pleroma limae (Brade) P.J.F.Guim. & Michelang.
- Pleroma luetzelburgii (Markgr.) P.J.F.Guim. & Michelang.
- Pleroma lutzii (Brade) P.J.F.Guim. & Michelang.
- Pleroma macrochiton (DC.) Triana
- Pleroma magdalenense (Brade) F.S.Mey. & R.Goldenb.
- Pleroma manicatum (Cogn.) P.J.F.Guim. & Michelang.
- Pleroma marinanum P.J.F.Guim. & Fraga
- Pleroma martiale (Cham.) Triana
- Pleroma martiusianum (DC.) P.J.F.Guim. & Michelang.
- Pleroma marumbiense (Wurdack) P.J.F.Guim. & Michelang.
- Pleroma maximilianum Triana
- Pleroma melanocalyx (R.Romero, P.J.F.Guim. & Leoni) P.J.F.Guim. & Michelang.
- Pleroma mello-barretoi (Brade) P.J.F.Guim. & Michelang.
- Pleroma michelangelii P.J.F.Guim. & J.G.Freitas
- Pleroma miconiifolium F.S.Mey. & R.Goldenb.
- Pleroma microphyllum (Cogn.) P.J.F.Guim. & Michelang.
- Pleroma minus (R.Romero & A.B.Martins) P.J.F.Guim. & Michelang.
- Pleroma minutiflorum (Cogn.) P.J.F.Guim. & Michelang.
- Pleroma mirabile (Brade & Markgr.) P.J.F.Guim. & Michelang.
- Pleroma molle (Cham.) Triana
- Pleroma mosenii (Cogn.) P.J.F.Guim. & Michelang.
- Pleroma mourae (Cogn.) P.J.F.Guim. & Michelang.
- Pleroma mutabile (Vell.) Triana
- Pleroma noblickii (Wurdack) P.J.F.Guim. & Michelang.
- Pleroma nodosum (Wurdack) P.J.F.Guim. & Michelang.
- Pleroma obscurum Triana
- Pleroma ochypetalum (Ruiz & Pav.) D.Don
- Pleroma oleifolium (DC.) R.Romero & Versiane
- Pleroma oreophilum (Wurdack) P.J.F.Guim. & Michelang.
- Pleroma ornatum (Sw.) Triana
- Pleroma pallidum (Cogn.) P.J.F.Guim. & Michelang.
- Pleroma pauloalvinii (Vinha) P.J.F.Guim. & Michelang.
- Pleroma penduliflorum Fraga & P.J.F.Guim.
- Pleroma pereirae (Brade & Markgr.) P.J.F.Guim. & Michelang.
- Pleroma petiolatum (R.Romero & A.B.Martins) P.J.F.Guim. & Michelang.
- Pleroma petrophylax F.S.Mey. & R.Goldenb.
- Pleroma pilosum (Cogn.) P.J.F.Guim. & Michelang.
- Pleroma quartzophilum (Brade) P.J.F.Guim. & Michelang.
- Pleroma raddianum (DC.) Gardner
- Pleroma radula (Markgr.) P.J.F.Guim. & Michelang.
- Pleroma ramboi (Brade) P.J.F.Guim. & Michelang.
- Pleroma redivivum O.Berg ex Triana
- Pleroma regelianum (Cogn.) P.J.F.Guim. & Michelang.
- Pleroma reitzii (Brade) P.J.F.Guim. & Michelang.
- Pleroma riedelianum (Cogn.) P.J.F.Guim. & Michelang.
- Pleroma rigidulum (Naudin) P.J.F.Guim. & Michelang.
- Pleroma riparium (Markgr.) P.J.F.Guim. & Michelang.
- Pleroma robustum (Cogn.) P.J.F.Guim. & Michelang.
- Pleroma rubrobracteatum (R.Romero & P.J.F.Guim.) P.J.F.Guim. & Michelang.
- Pleroma rubrum J.G.Freitas
- Pleroma rupicola (Hoehne) P.J.F.Guim. & Michelang.
- Pleroma salviifolium (Cham.) Triana
- Pleroma scaberrimum Triana
- Pleroma schenckii (Cogn.) P.J.F.Guim. & Michelang.
- Pleroma schwackei (Cogn.) P.J.F.Guim. & Michelang.
- Pleroma sellowianum (Cham.) P.J.F.Guim. & Michelang.
- Pleroma semidecandrum (Schrank & Mart. ex DC.) Triana
- Pleroma setosociliatum (Cogn.) F.S.Mey. & F.B.Matos
- Pleroma stellipile (Wurdack) P.J.F.Guim. & Michelang.
- Pleroma stenocarpum (DC.) Triana
- Pleroma stipulaceum (Vinha) P.J.F.Guim. & Michelang.
- Pleroma subglabrum (Wurdack) P.J.F.Guim. & Michelang.
- Pleroma subsessilis F.S.Mey. & L.Kollmann
- Pleroma taperoense (Wurdack) P.J.F.Guim. & Michelang.
- Pleroma tedescoi (Meirelles, L.Kollmann & R.Goldenb.) P.J.F.Guim. & Michelang.
- Pleroma thereminianum (DC.) Triana
- Pleroma tomentulosum (Wurdack) P.J.F.Guim. & Michelang.
- Pleroma trichopodum DC.
- Pleroma trinervium P.J.F.Guim.
- Pleroma tuberosum Gardner ex Triana
- Pleroma urceolare (DC.) Triana
- Pleroma ursinum (Cham.) Triana
- Pleroma urvilleanum (DC.) P.J.F.Guim. & Michelang.
- Pleroma velutinum (Naudin) Triana
- Pleroma venetiense F.S.Mey., L.Kollmann & R.Goldenb.
- Pleroma villosissimum Triana
- Pleroma vimineum (D.Don) D.Don
- Pleroma virgatum Gardner
- Pleroma viscosa R. Romero

- Pleroma wurdackianum (R.Romero & A.B.Martins) P.J.F.Guim. & Michelang.

== Distribution and habitat ==
Pleroma species are mostly native to eastern Brazil in the Atlantic Forest and Cerrado biomes, more rarely in the Caatinga. A few species reach other parts of South America and the Caribbean (Bolivia, Colombia, Ecuador, French Guiana, the Leeward Islands, Peru, Puerto Rico and Venezuela). They are found in forests and forest margins, river banks, high altitude grasslands, rocky outcrops and restingas, from sea level up to an elevation of 2,650 m.
