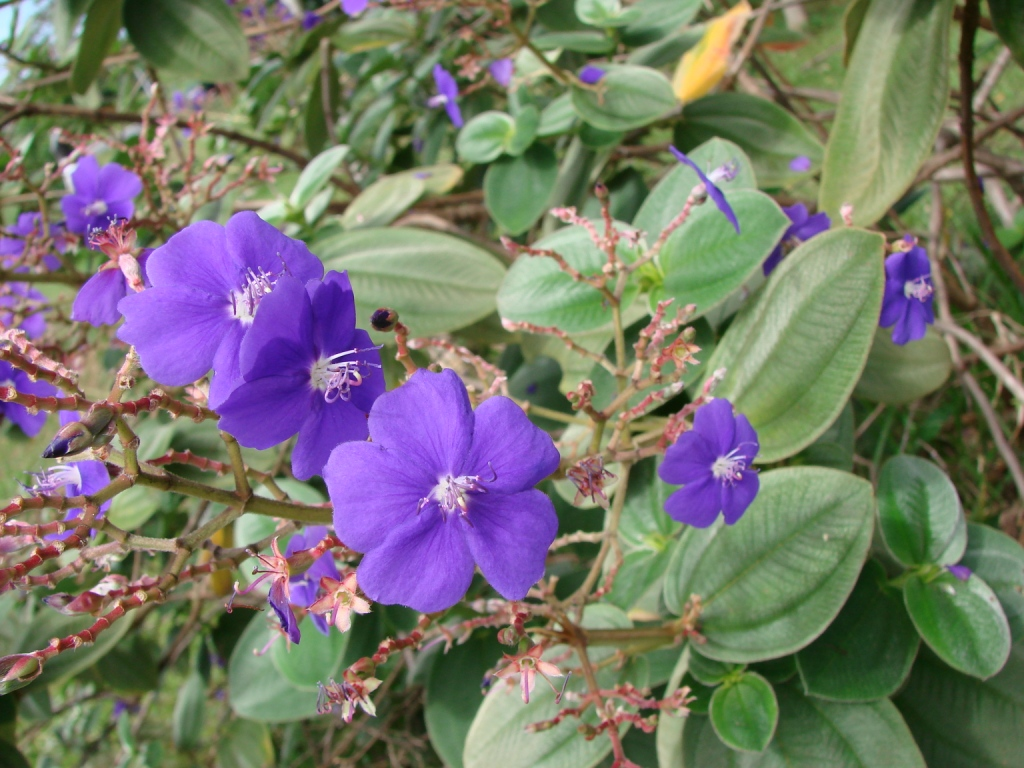
- at Universidade de Brasília, Brazil

Scientific classification
- Kingdom: Plantae
- Clade: Tracheophytes
- Clade: Angiosperms
- Clade: Eudicots
- Clade: Rosids
- Order: Myrtales
- Family: Melastomataceae
- Genus: Pleroma
- Species: P. heteromallum

Binomial name
- Pleroma heteromallum (D.Don) D.Don

Synonyms
- Lasiandra adenostemon DC.; Lasiandra heteramalla (D.Don) Naudin; Lasiandra macrophylla Naudin; Lasiandra multiflora (Gardner) Naudin; Melastoma heteromallum D.Don; Meriania adenostemon Schrank ex DC.; Pleroma adenostemon (DC.) A.Gray; Pleroma multiflora Gardner; Tibouchina adenostemon (DC.) Cogn.; Tibouchina grandifolia Cogn.; Tibouchina heteromalla (D.Don) Cogn.; Tibouchina magdalenensis Brade; Tibouchina multiflora (Gardner) Cogn.

= Pleroma heteromallum =

Species of flowering plant

Pleroma heteromallum, synonyms including Tibouchina grandifolia and Tibouchina heteromalla, known by the common name silverleafed princess flower in English, is a species of evergreen flowering plant in the family Melastomataceae. It is native to French Guiana, Bolivia and Brazil.

== Description ==
Pleroma heteromallum reaches an average height of 4–6 feet (1.2–1.8 m), with a maximum of about 8–10 feet (2.4–3.0 m) in its native habitat. The branching stem is woody and the large, silvery green leaves are simple, ovate, velvety in texture, and oppositely arranged. The inflorescence is a panicle of several purple flowers with five petals. The plant has 4–6 inches (10–15 cm) long leaves, with prominent veins that are puffed up in the middle and old leaves will often turn an orange color just prior to dropping off.

== Cultivation ==
The plant is cultivated as an ornamental for its showy foliage and purple flowers. It is sensitive to cold but can tolerate a light frost.

== Gallery ==
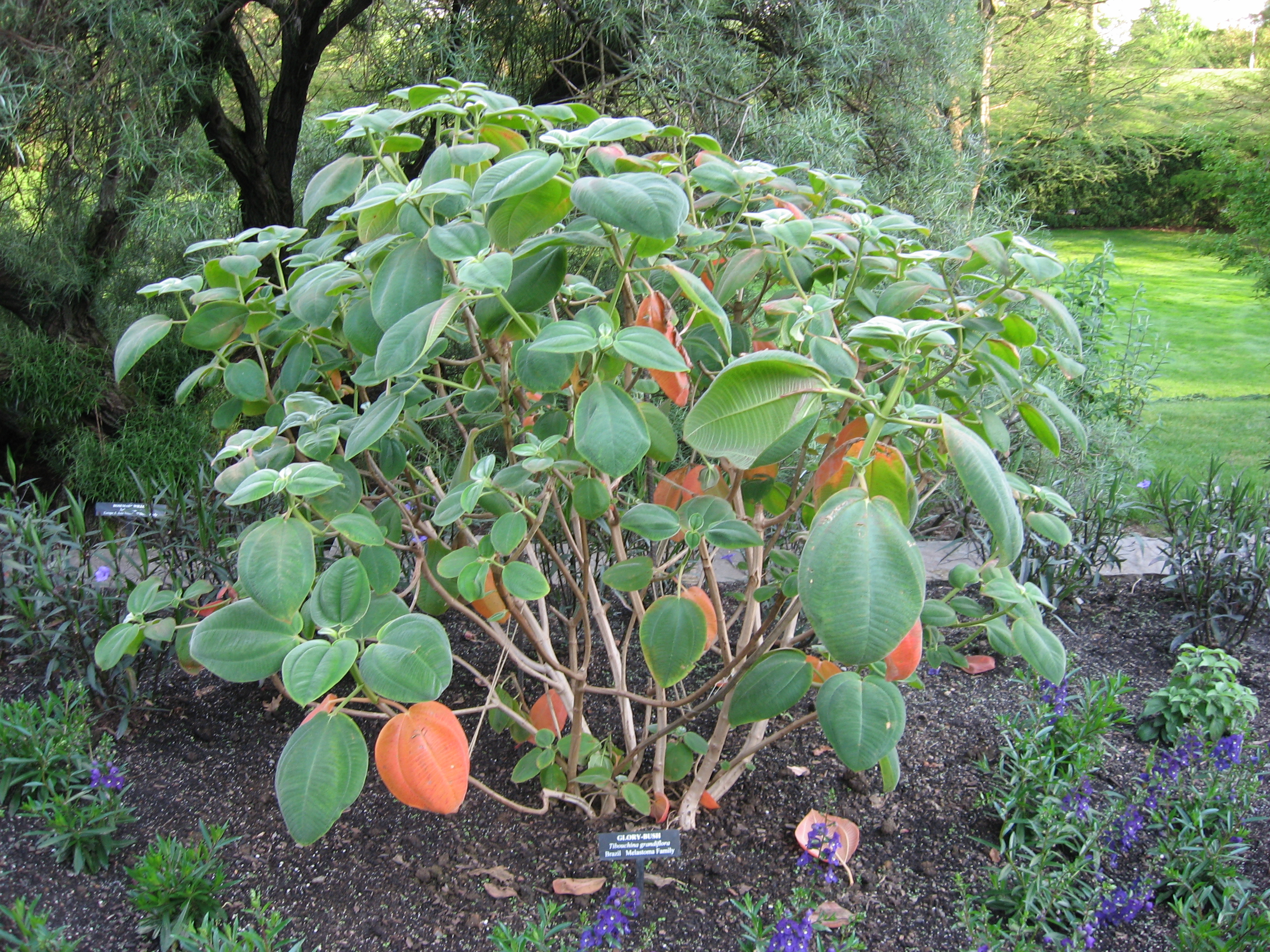
Habit

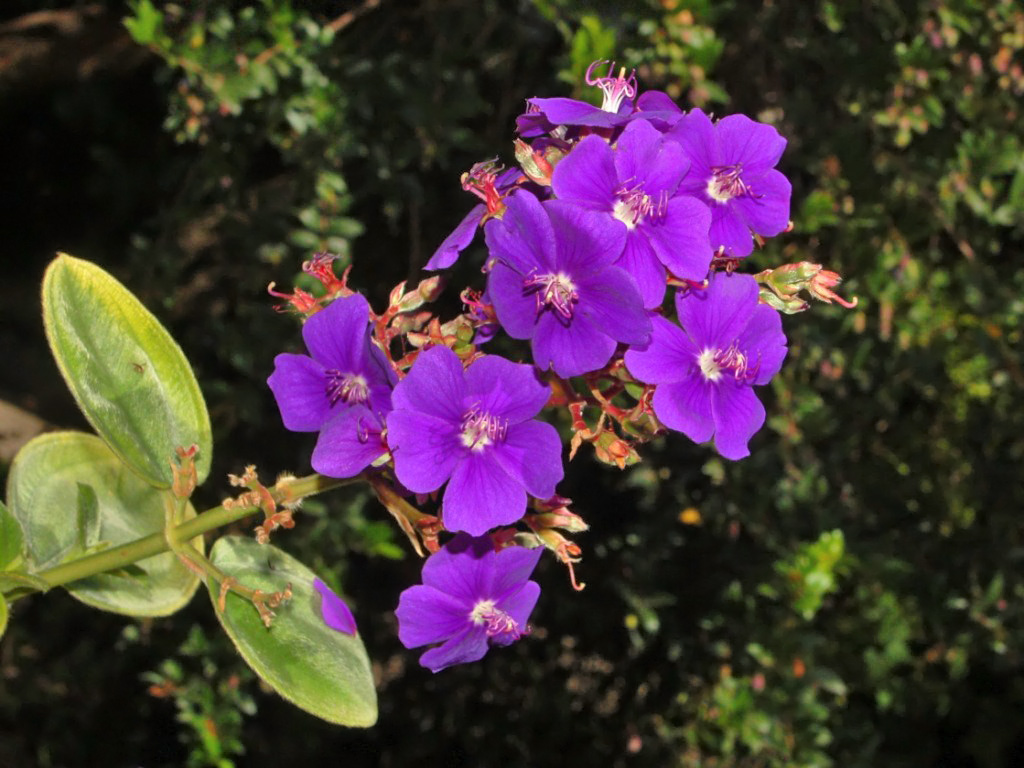
Inflorescence

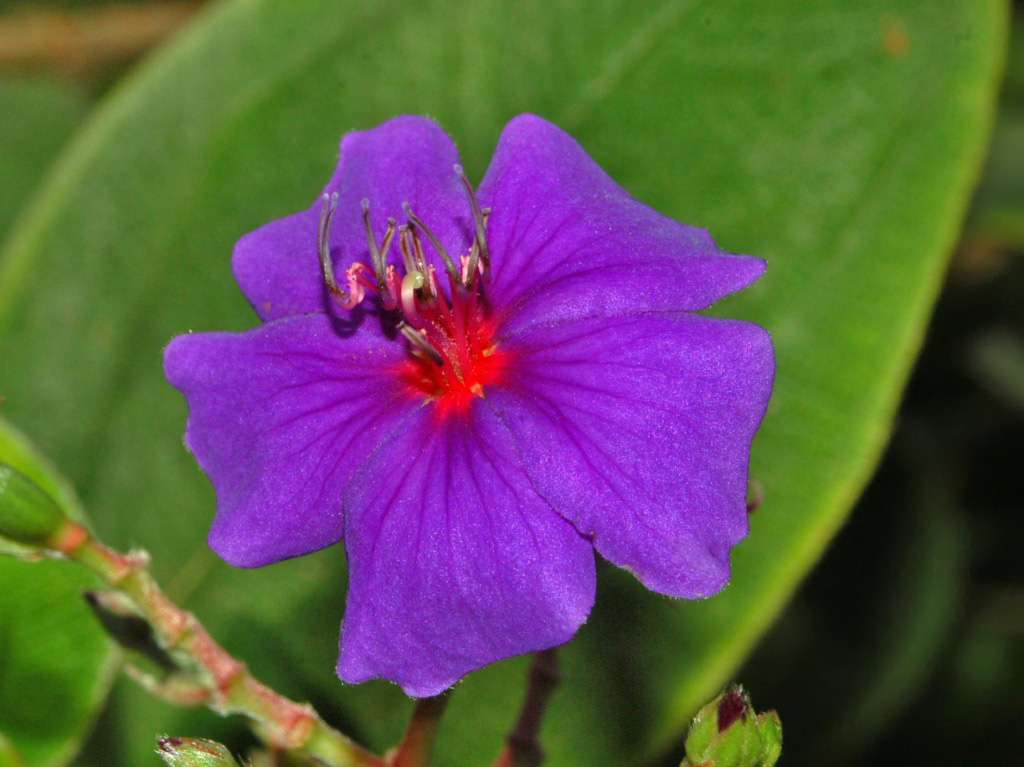
Flower

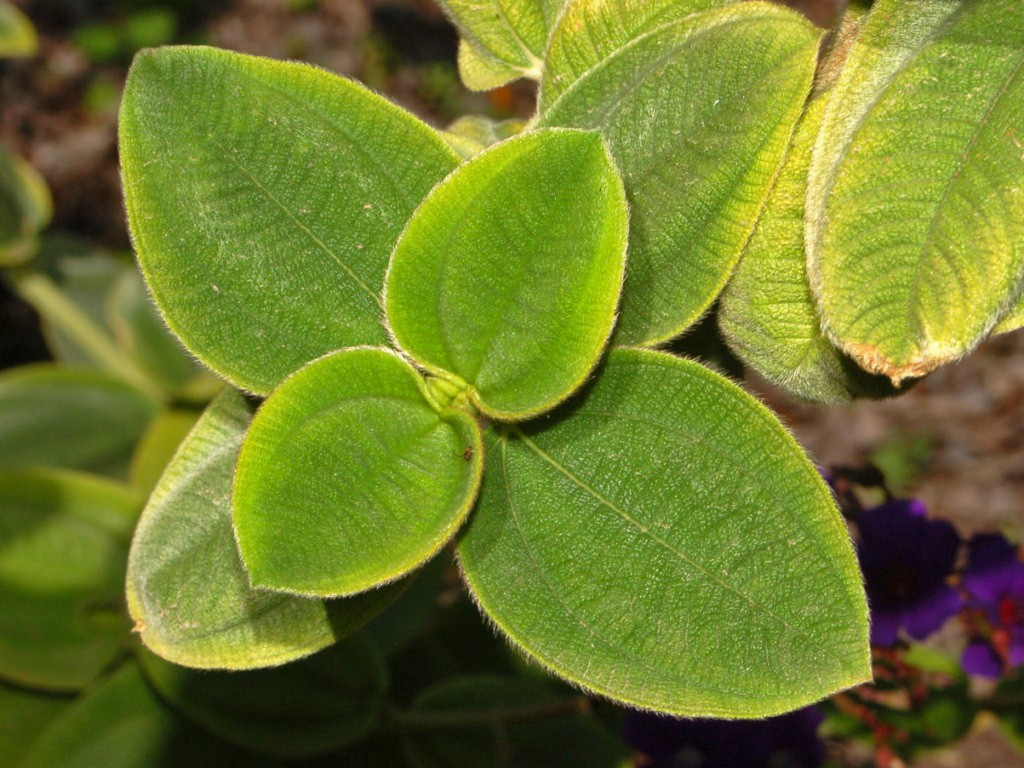
Foliage

== Sources ==
- Porembski, S., et al. (1998). Diversity and ecology of saxicolous vegetation mats on inselbergs in the Brazilian Atlantic Rainforest. Diversity and Distributions 4(3) 107–19.
- Renner, S. S. (1989). A survey of reproductive biology in neotropical Melastomataceae and Memecylaceae. Annals of the Missouri Botanical Garden.
