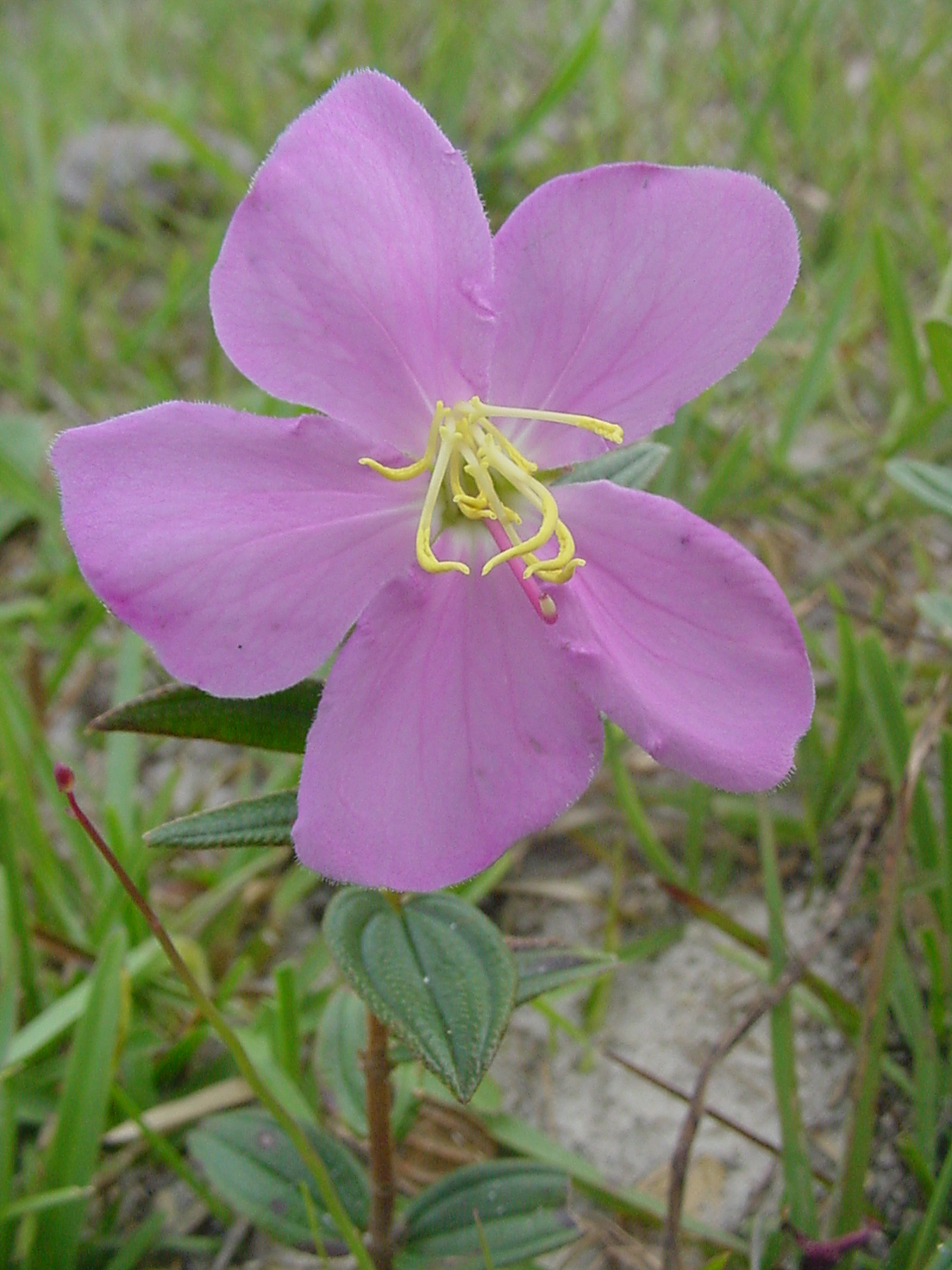
- In Mostardas, Brazil

Scientific classification
- Kingdom: Plantae
- Clade: Tracheophytes
- Clade: Angiosperms
- Clade: Eudicots
- Clade: Rosids
- Order: Myrtales
- Family: Melastomataceae
- Genus: Pleroma
- Species: P. asperius

Binomial name
- Pleroma asperius (Cham.) Triana

Synonyms
- Lasiandra asperior Cham.; Tibouchina asperior (Cham.) Cogn.; Tibouchina intermedia Cogn.

= Pleroma asperius =

Species of flowering plant

Pleroma asperius is a species of flowering plant in the family Melastomataceae, native to Brazil. It was first described by Adelbert von Chamisso in 1834 as Lasiandra asperior. One of its synonyms is Tibouchina asperior.
