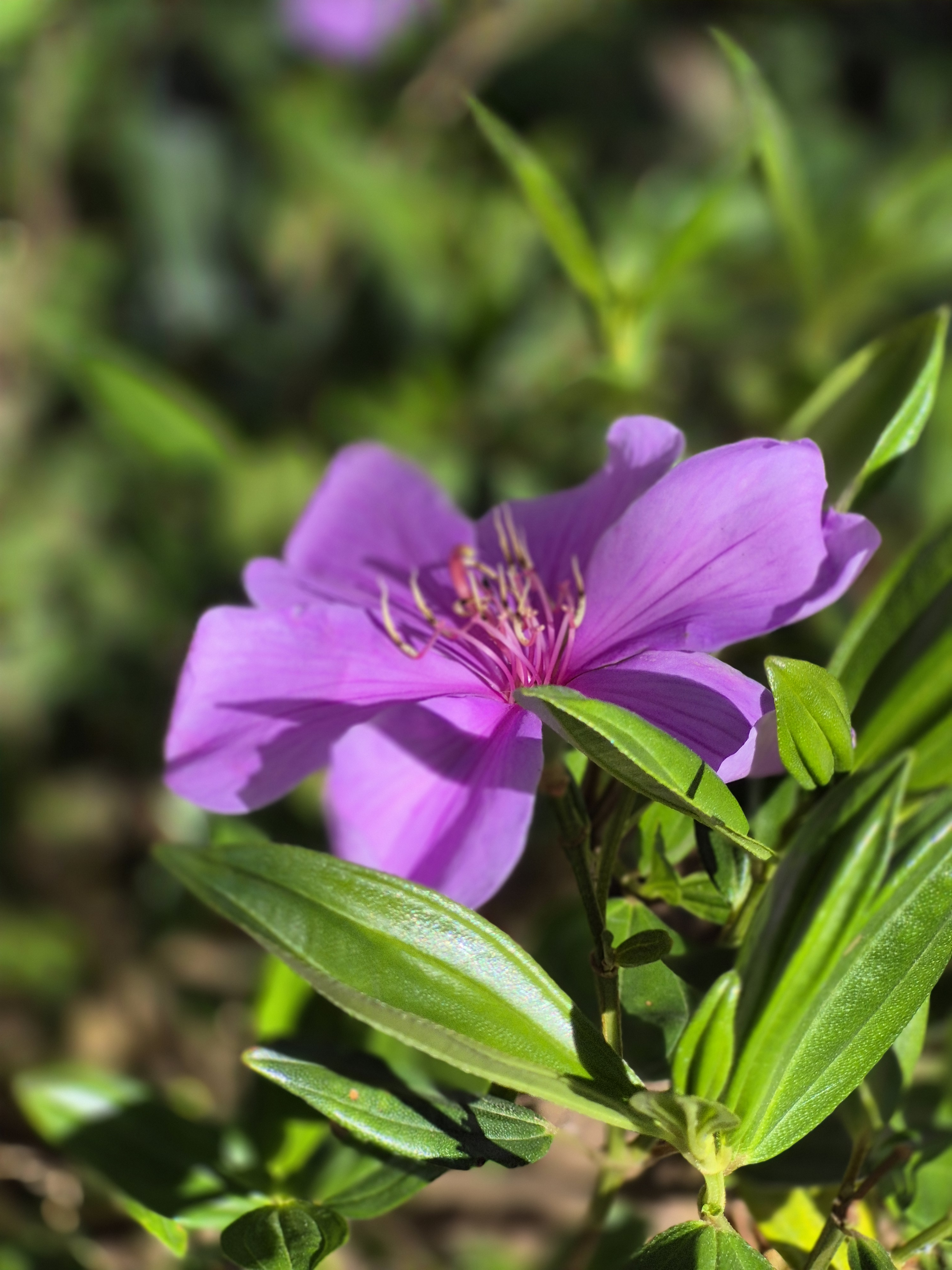
- Close-up of flower and leaves
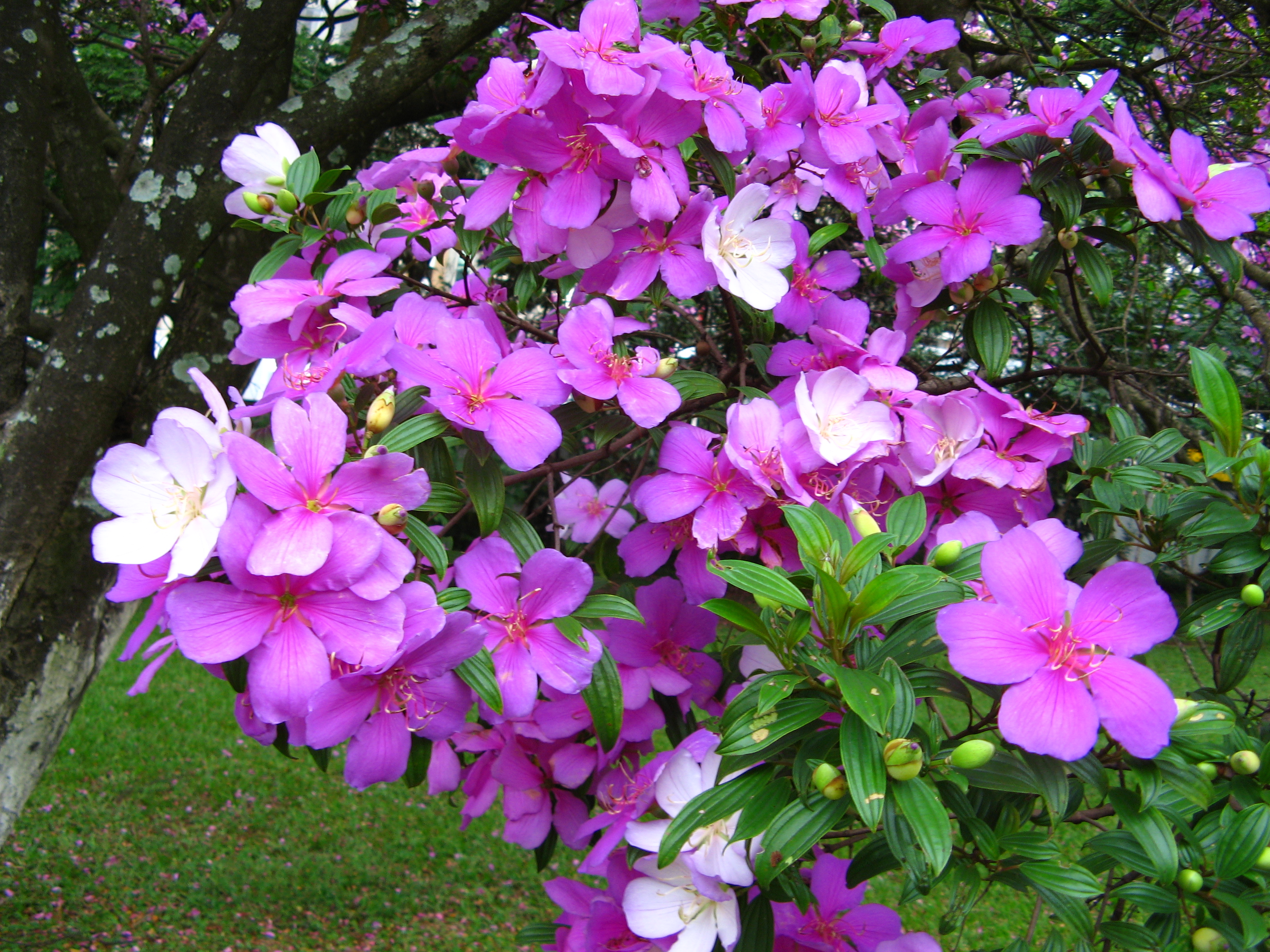
- Flowers in different colours

Scientific classification
- Kingdom: Plantae
- Clade: Tracheophytes
- Clade: Angiosperms
- Clade: Eudicots
- Clade: Rosids
- Order: Myrtales
- Family: Melastomataceae
- Genus: Pleroma
- Species: P. mutabile

Binomial name
- Pleroma mutabile (Vell.) Triana

Synonyms
- Lasiandra mutabilis (Vell.) Riedel ex Naudin; Melastoma mutabile Vell.; Tibouchina mutabilis (Vell.) Cogn.

= Pleroma mutabile =

Brazilian evergreen tree

Pleroma mutabile, synonym Tibouchina mutabilis, is an evergreen pioneer tree with an open crown, native to the Brazilian Atlantic Forest, mainly at the Serra do Mar zone, in the states of São Paulo, Paraná, Rio de Janeiro, and Santa Catarina.

In Brazil, it is named manacá-da-serra. The word "manacá" means "flower" in Tupi-guarani language. "Serra" (ridge, in English) alludes to the Serra do Mar (Sea's Ridge).

In Australia, it is a popular ornamental plant, also known as glory bush.

== Description ==
Pleroma mutabile can grow up to 12 metres in height. The short, slender bole can reach 14 inches in diameter.

The wood is sometimes harvested from the wild for furniture making. It is an ornamental tree with flowers in three colours. It is suitable for use in urban landscaping, since its roots do not affect nearby structures.

It is a very resistant tree and is suitable for container gardening. Although this tree can reach 12 meters in height, if kept in a container the pot limits the available space for its roots, which restricts the tree's growth.

This plant prefers full sun, but will tolerate a small amount of shade. Must be planted in well-drained soils, rich in organic matter.

== Landscaping ==
Initially cultivated as an ornamental plant in the South and Southeast regions of Brazil, where it occurs naturally, it quickly became popular for landscaping all over the country. It is normally a recommended tree for urban areas, because its roots are not aggressive, thus they do not destroy sidewalks and walls. The tree's small or medium size does not affect the urban electrical wiring, either.
