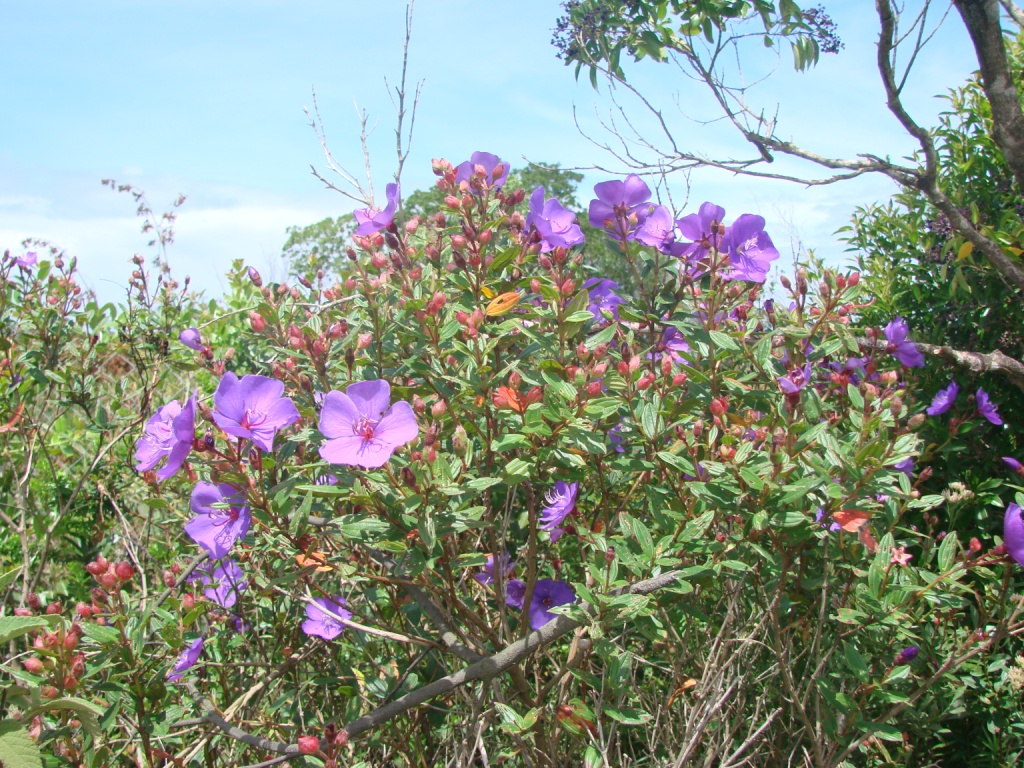

Scientific classification
- Kingdom: Plantae
- Clade: Embryophytes
- Clade: Tracheophytes
- Clade: Angiosperms
- Clade: Eudicots
- Clade: Rosids
- Order: Myrtales
- Family: Melastomataceae
- Genus: Pleroma
- Species: P. trichopodum

Binomial name
- Pleroma trichopodum DC.

Synonyms
- Lasiandra multiceps Naudin; Lasiandra nigrescens Naudin; Lasiandra tibouchinoides DC.; Lasiandra trichopoda (DC.) Naudin; Rhexia tibouchinoides Schrank & Mart. ex DC.; Tibouchina multiceps (Naudin) Cogn.; Tibouchina trichopoda (DC.) Baill.

= Pleroma trichopodum =

Species of flowering plant

Pleroma trichopodum is a species of flowering plant in the family Melastomataceae, native to south and southeastern Brazil. It was first described by Augustin de Candolle in 1828. One of its synonyms is Tibouchina trichopoda.

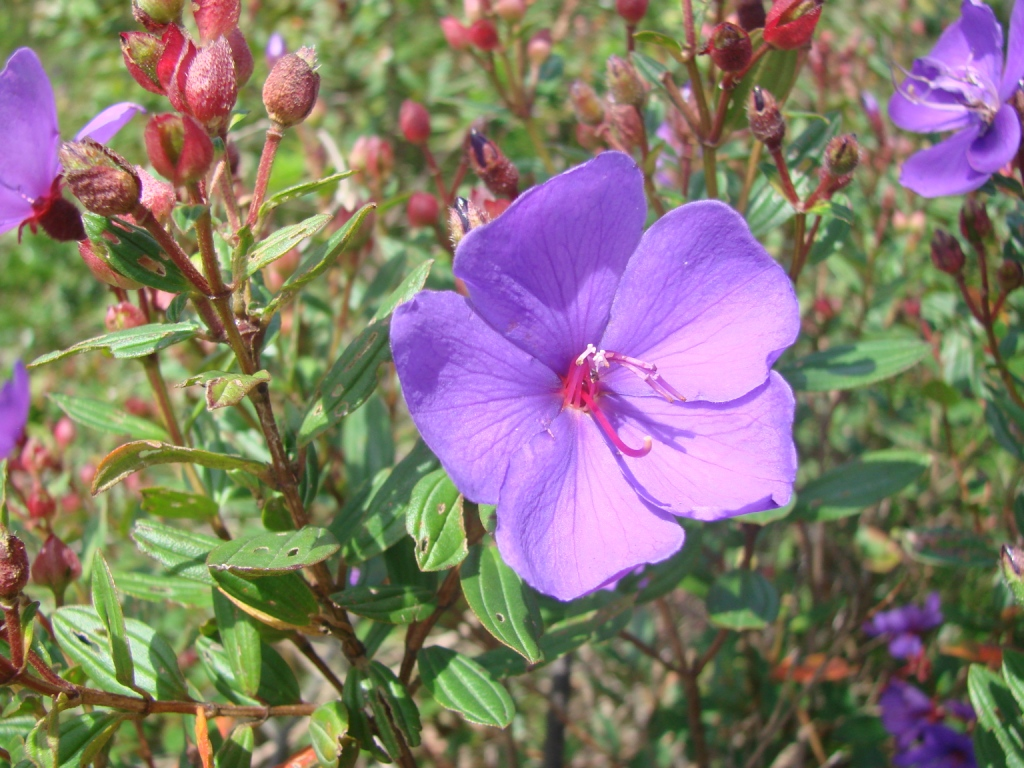
Flower
