= Manilkara multifida =

Conservation status
- Near Threatened (IUCN 3.1)

Scientific classification
- Kingdom: Plantae
- Clade: Tracheophytes
- Clade: Angiosperms
- Clade: Eudicots
- Clade: Asterids
- Order: Ericales
- Family: Sapotaceae
- Genus: Manilkara
- Species: M. multifida

Binomial name
- Manilkara multifida T.D.Penn.

Species of flowering plant

Manilkara multifida is a species of plant in the family Sapotaceae.

The plant is endemic to the Atlantic Forest ecoregion in southeastern Brazil.

By the IUCN, it is near threatened by habitat loss.

== See also ==
- Pau Brasil National Park — plant is native in the park.
