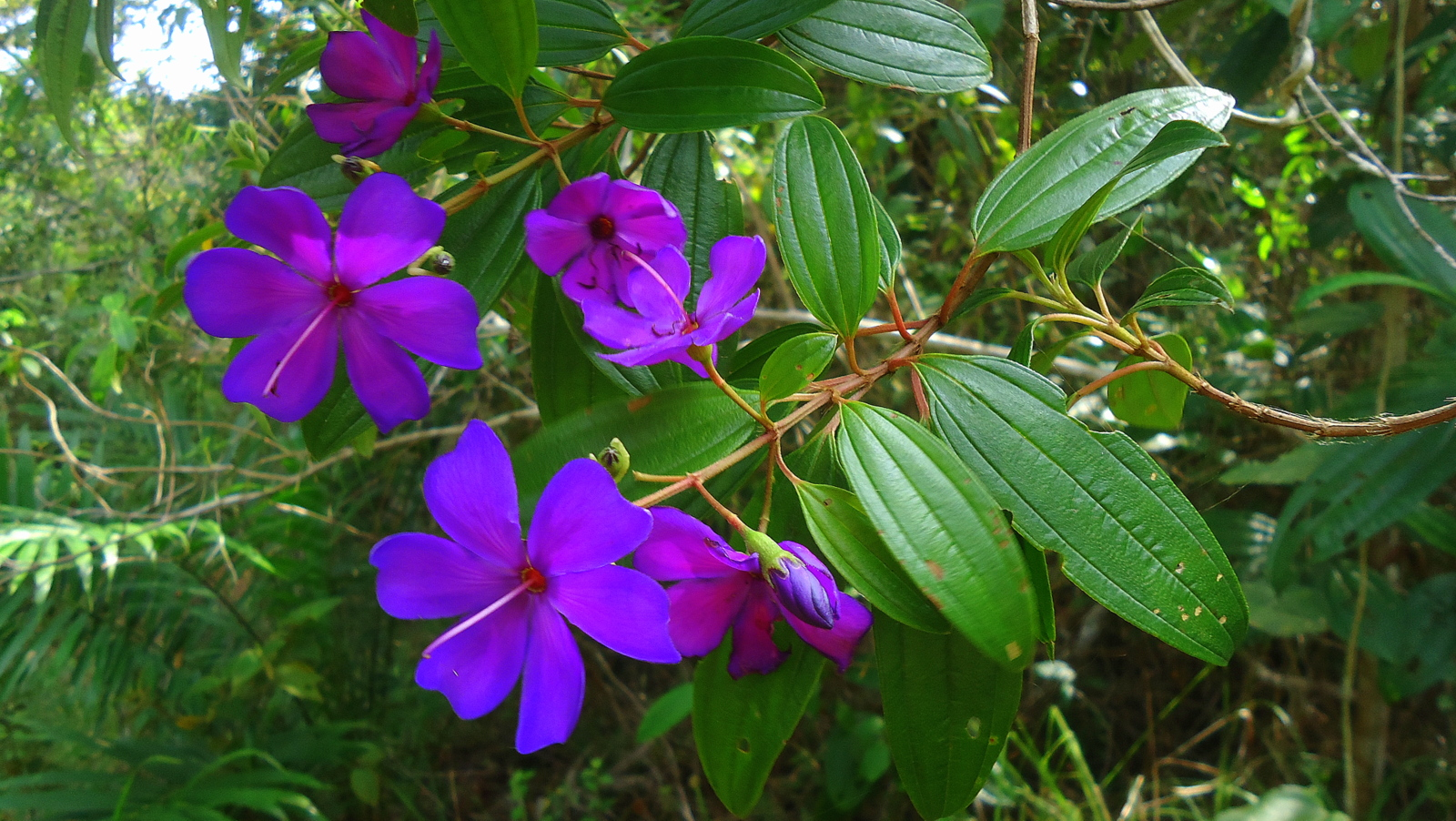

Scientific classification
- Kingdom: Plantae
- Clade: Tracheophytes
- Clade: Angiosperms
- Clade: Eudicots
- Clade: Rosids
- Order: Myrtales
- Family: Melastomataceae
- Genus: Pleroma
- Species: P. francavillanum

Binomial name
- Pleroma francavillanum (Cogn.) P.J.F.Guim. & Michelang.

Synonyms
- Tibouchina francavillana Cogn.

= Pleroma francavillanum =

Species of flowering plant

Pleroma francavillanum is a species of flowering plant in the family Melastomataceae, native to Brazil. It was first described by Alfred Cogniaux in 1885 as Tibouchina francavillana.

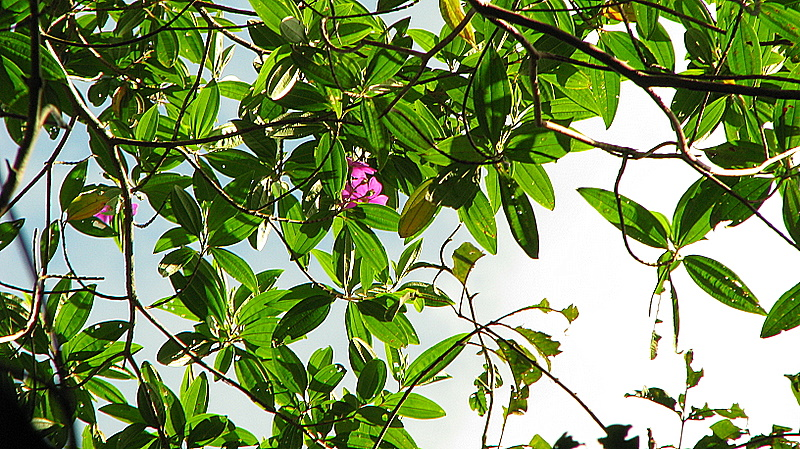

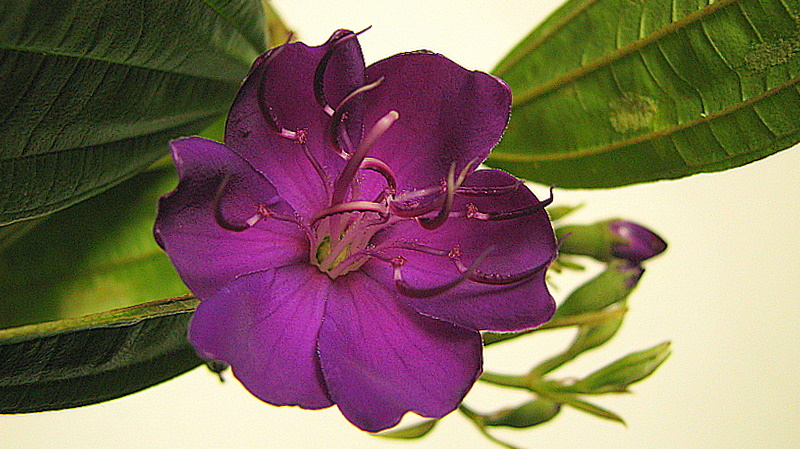
Flower
