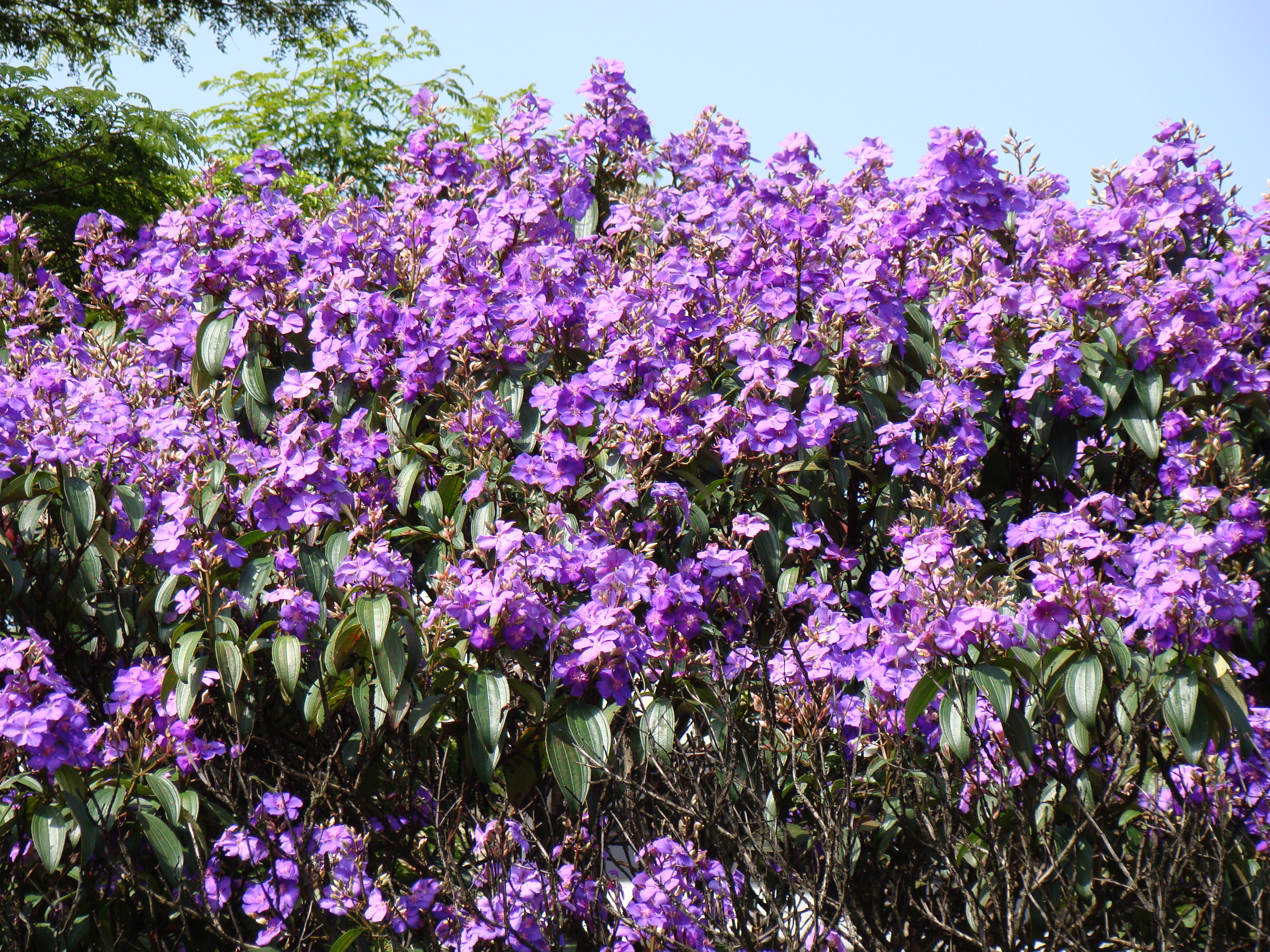
- In cultivation in São Paulo, Brazil

Scientific classification
- Kingdom: Plantae
- Clade: Embryophytes
- Clade: Tracheophytes
- Clade: Angiosperms
- Clade: Eudicots
- Clade: Rosids
- Order: Myrtales
- Family: Melastomataceae
- Genus: Pleroma
- Species: P. granulosum

Binomial name
- Pleroma granulosum (Desr.) D.Don

Synonyms
- Antheryta granulosa (Desr.) Raf.; Lasiandra fontanesiana DC.; Melastoma fontanesii Spreng.; Melastoma granulosum Desr.; Rhexia alata Raddi; Rhexia dasystaminea Schrank ex DC.; Rhexia fontanesii Bonpl.; Rhexia formosissima Raddi; Tibouchina granulosa (Desr.) Cogn.

= Pleroma granulosum =

Brazilian evergreen tree

Pleroma granulosum, synonym Tibouchina granulosa, is a species of tree in the family Melastomataceae. It is also known as purple glory tree or princess flower. It is native to Bolivia and Brazil. Because its purple-flowers bloom for most of the year, this tree is often used for gardening in Brazil, where is known by the name quaresmeira.

== Cultivation ==
Considered as one of the most ornamental species of the tropical flora for the foliage as well as for the abundant flowering, which lasts from spring to late autumn, it is widely cultivable in the tropical and subtropical climate zones.

This tree can grow up to 10 metres in height (32.81 feet) and needs good drainage acidic soil for flowering. The use of an acid fertilizer is recommended. It will grow in full to partial sun, needs average water, and below freezing temperatures should be avoided.

This tree can grow in USDA hardiness zone 10b to 11 or in any areas that do not experience too much cold, such as acidic coastal zones of Florida.

Pleroma granulosum can withstand sub-freezing temperatures for several hours, but if low temperatures extend for a longer period, they might damage the plant's leaves, stems, and sprouts. When this happens, the roots usually survive and produce new upper growth the following spring. Although the plant can perform a quick recovery, it might not bloom, since it puts most of its energy into producing new stems and leaves.

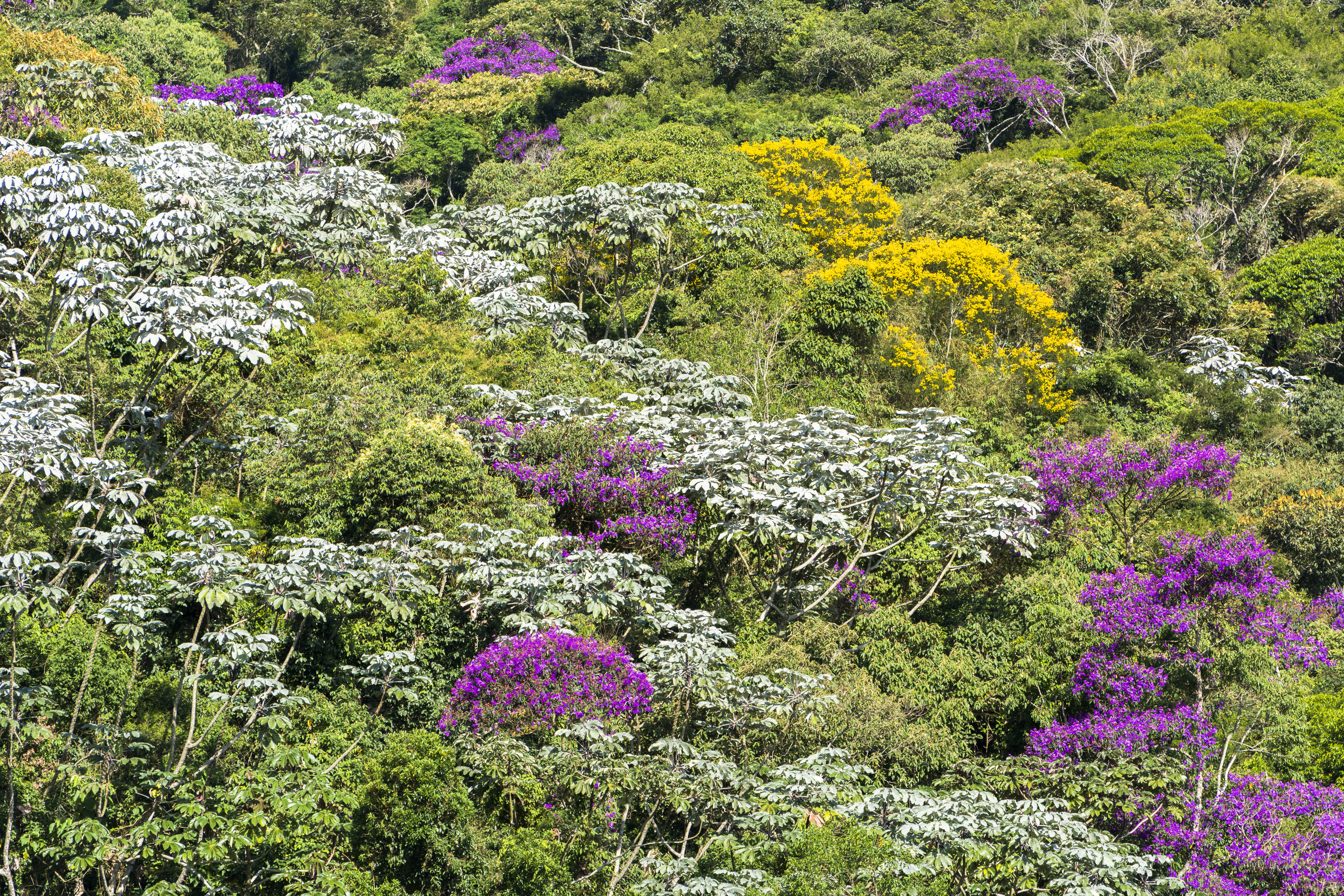
In habitat (plants with purple flowers), near the Parque Nacional do Caparaó, Brazil

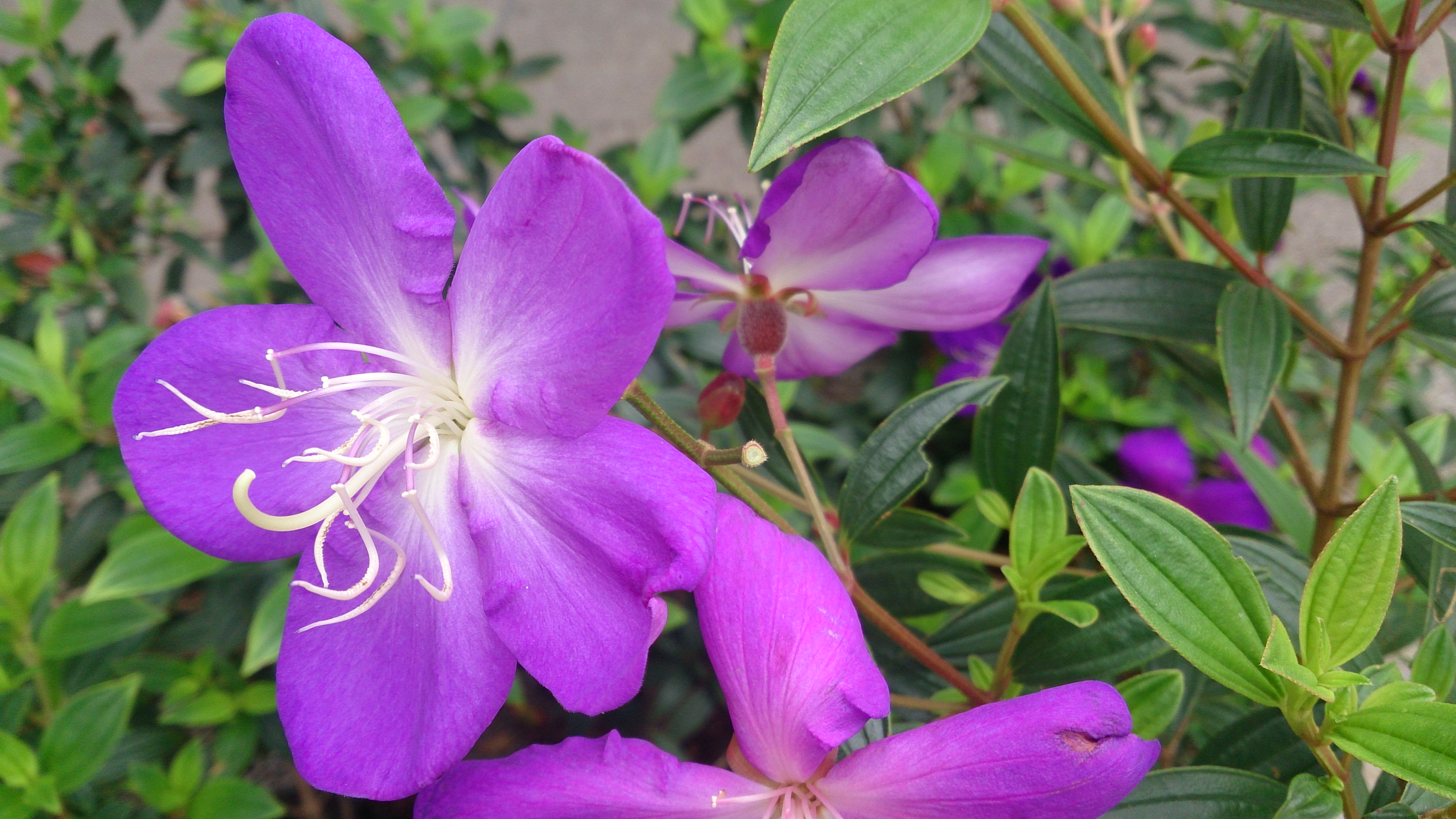
Flowers and leaves - Purple Glory Tree

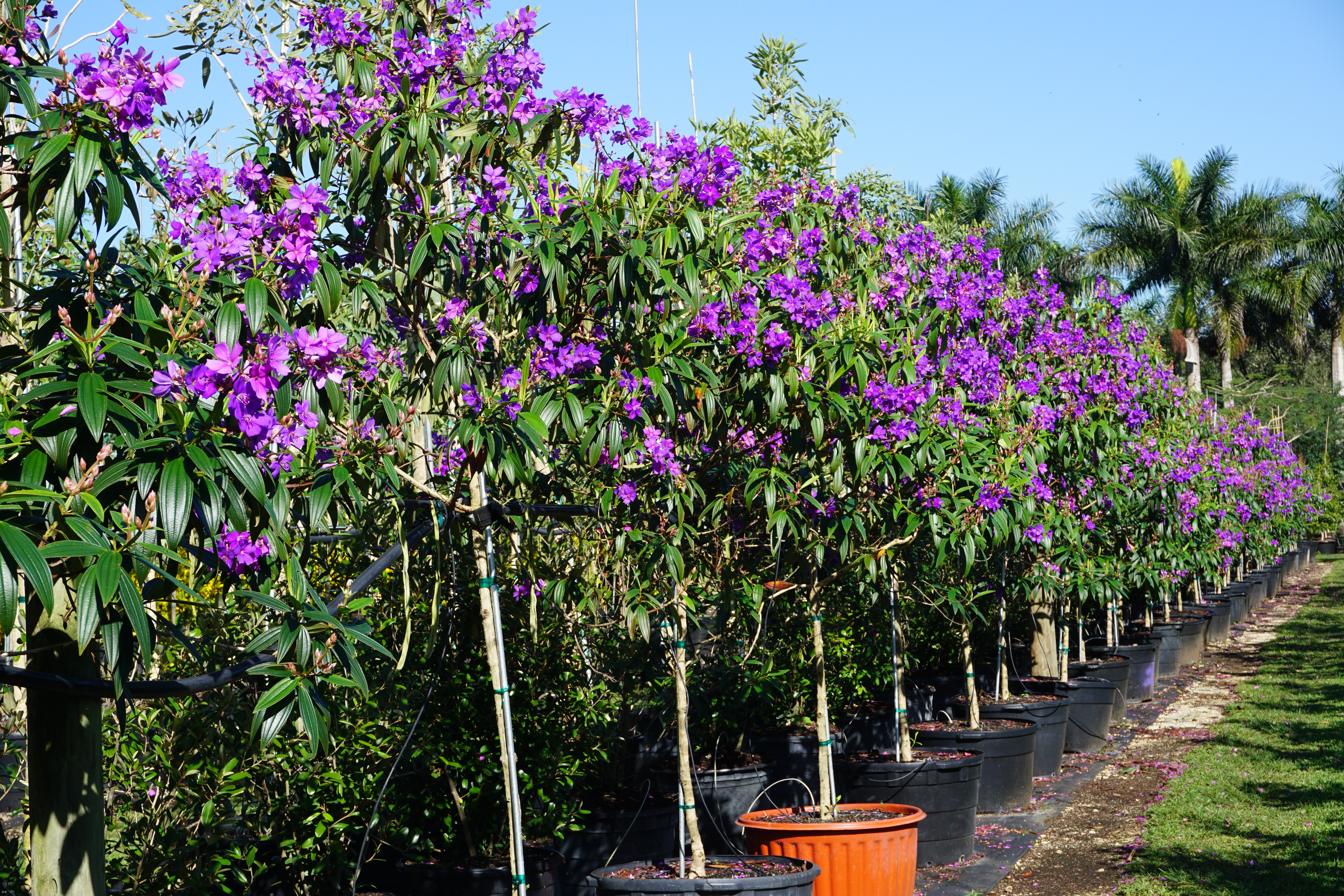
Young trees for sale

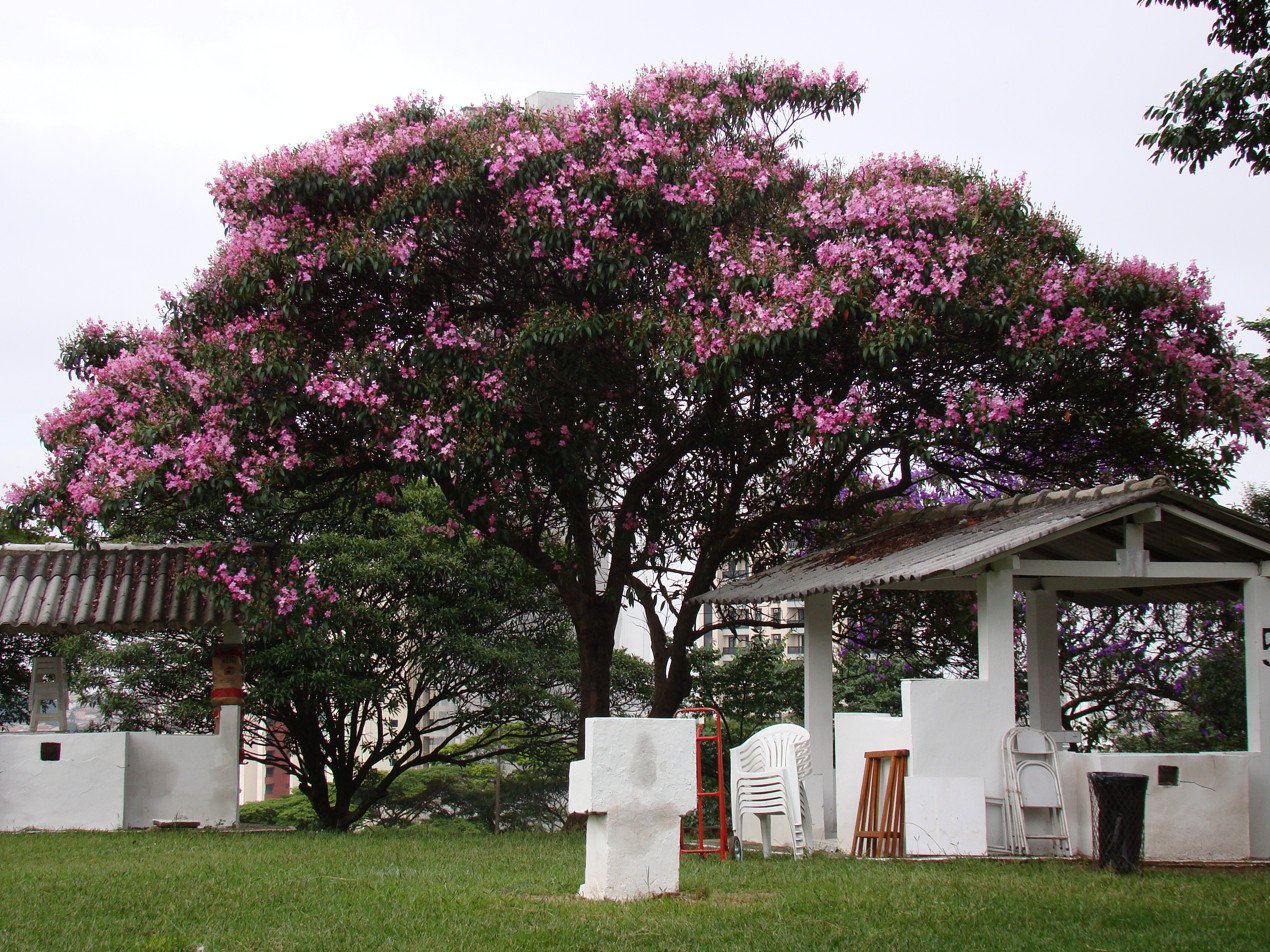
Pink-flowered cultivar ('Kathleen')
