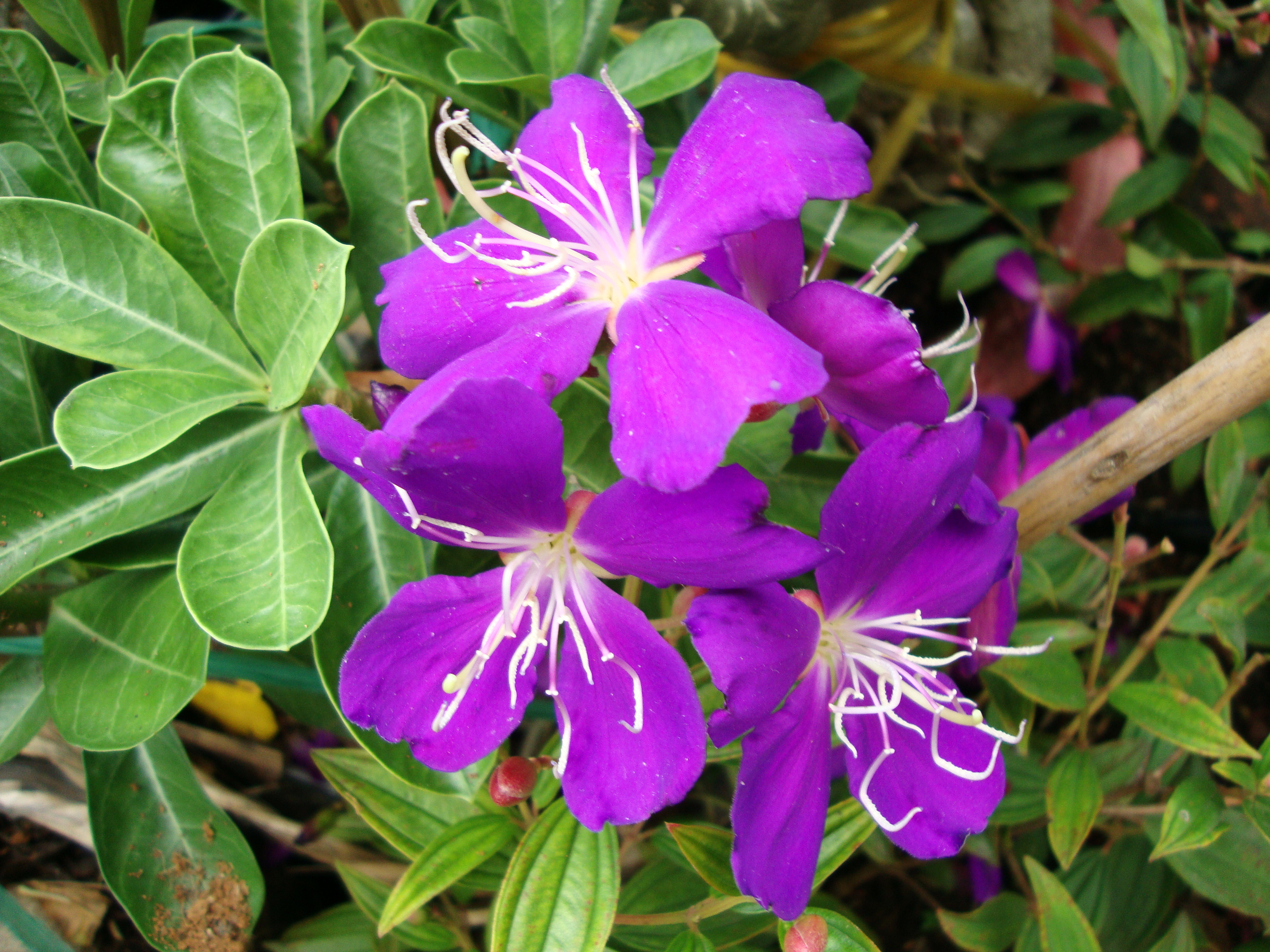

Scientific classification
- Kingdom: Plantae
- Clade: Embryophytes
- Clade: Tracheophytes
- Clade: Spermatophytes
- Clade: Angiosperms
- Clade: Eudicots
- Clade: Rosids
- Order: Myrtales
- Family: Melastomataceae
- Genus: Pleroma
- Species: P. semidecandrum

Binomial name
- Pleroma semidecandrum (Schrank & Mart. ex DC.) Triana

Synonyms
- Lasiandra macrocarpa Naudin; Lasiandra semidecandra Schrank & Mart. ex DC.; Pleroma macranthum Hook.f.; Tibouchina semidecandra (Schrank & Mart. ex DC.) Cogn.

= Pleroma semidecandrum =

Species of flowering plant

Pleroma semidecandrum, commonly known as princess flower, glory bush, or lasiandra, is a flowering plant in the family Melastomataceae, native to southeast Brazil.

== Description ==
It is a sprawling, evergreen shrub or small ornamental tree native to Brazil and ranges from 3.0 to 4.6 m (10 to 15 ft) in height. The dark green, velvety, 100–150 mm (4–6 in) long leaves have several prominent longitudinal veins instead of the usual one, and are often edged in red.

Large, royal purple blossoms, flaring open to 130 mm (5 in), are held on terminal panicles above the foliage, creating a spectacular sight when in full bloom. Some flowers are open throughout the year but they are especially plentiful from May to January.

== Cultivation ==
They can tolerate the shade but will not thrive. Princess-Flower is ideal for the mixed shrubbery border or used in small groupings to compound the impact of bloom-time.

Nematodes can affect Tibouchina and over watering can contribute to mushroom root-rot. It can be trimmed to any size and still put on a vivid, year-long flower display.

== Chemistry ==
Pleroma semidecandrum contains the dimeric ellagitannin nobotanin B.
