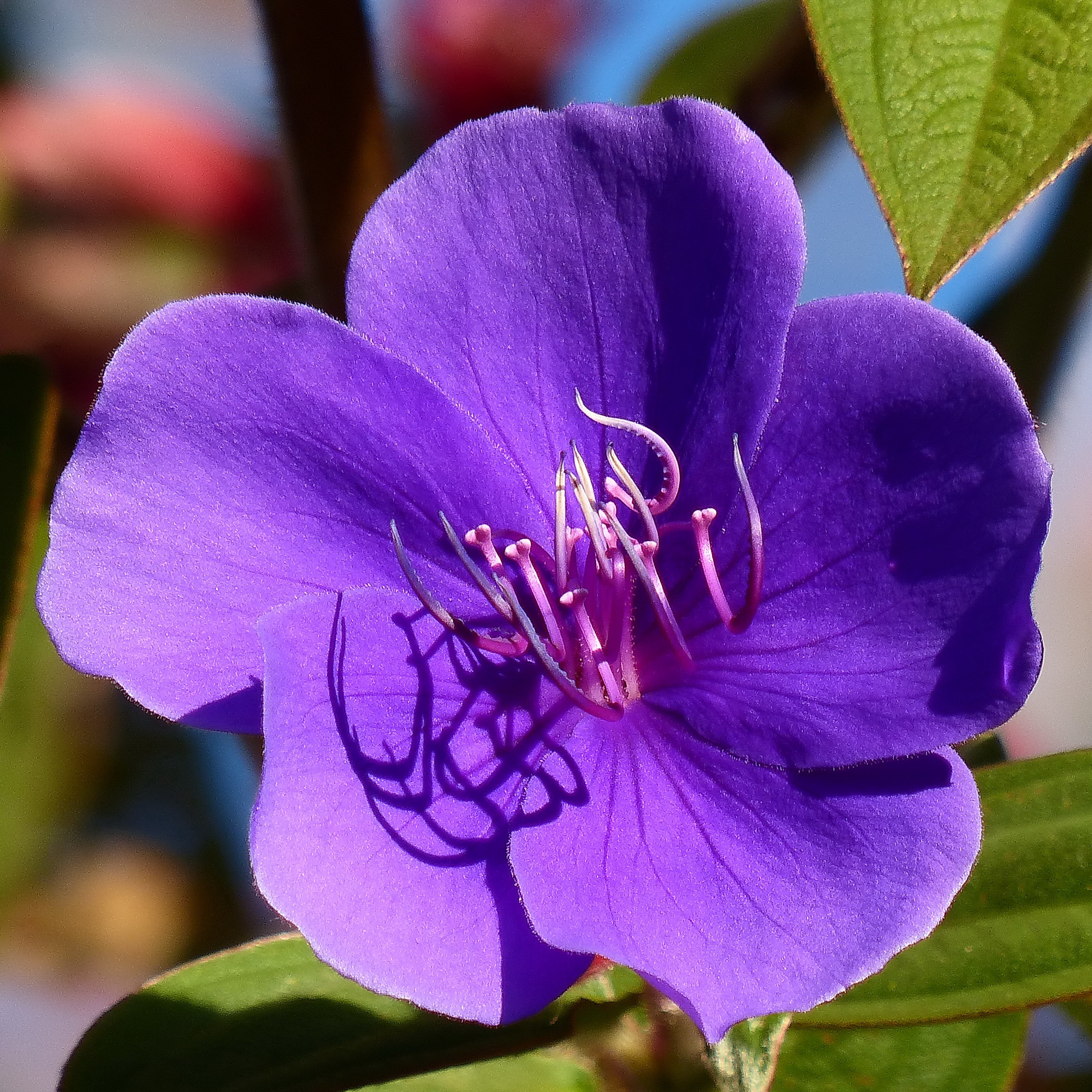

Scientific classification
- Kingdom: Plantae
- Clade: Tracheophytes
- Clade: Angiosperms
- Clade: Eudicots
- Clade: Rosids
- Order: Myrtales
- Family: Melastomataceae
- Genus: Pleroma
- Species: P. urvilleanum

Binomial name
- Pleroma urvilleanum (DC.) P.J.F.Guim. & Michelang.

Synonyms
- Lasiandra macrantha Vuk.; Lasiandra urvilleana DC.; Tibouchina paulistana Hoehne; Tibouchina urceolaris var. papillosa Hoehne; Tibouchina urvilleana (DC.) Cogn.

= Pleroma urvilleanum =

Species of flowering plant

Pleroma urvilleanum, synonym Tibouchina urvilleana, is a species of flowering plant in the family Melastomataceae, native to Brazil.

Common names include:

- glory bush
- lasiandra
- princess flower
- pleroma
- purple glory tree

The specific epithet urvilleanum commemorates the 19th-century French explorer and botanist Jules Dumont d'Urville.

== Description ==
Growing to 3–6 m (10–20 ft) tall by 2–3 m (7–10 ft) wide, it is a sprawling evergreen shrub with longitudinally veined, dark green hairy leaves. Clusters of brilliant purple flowers up to 10 cm (4 in) in diameter, with black stamens, are borne throughout summer and autumn.

== Cultivation ==
Under the synonym Tibouchina urvilleana, Pleroma urvilleanum has gained the Royal Horticultural Society's Award of Garden Merit.

With a minimum temperature of 3 °C (37 °F), it requires some winter protection, and in temperate areas is often grown in a conservatory. However, it can also be grown outside in a sunny, sheltered spot. Plants are best grown in acidic and well-drained soils and spread by suckers. It can be trained as a vine and grown on a trellis.

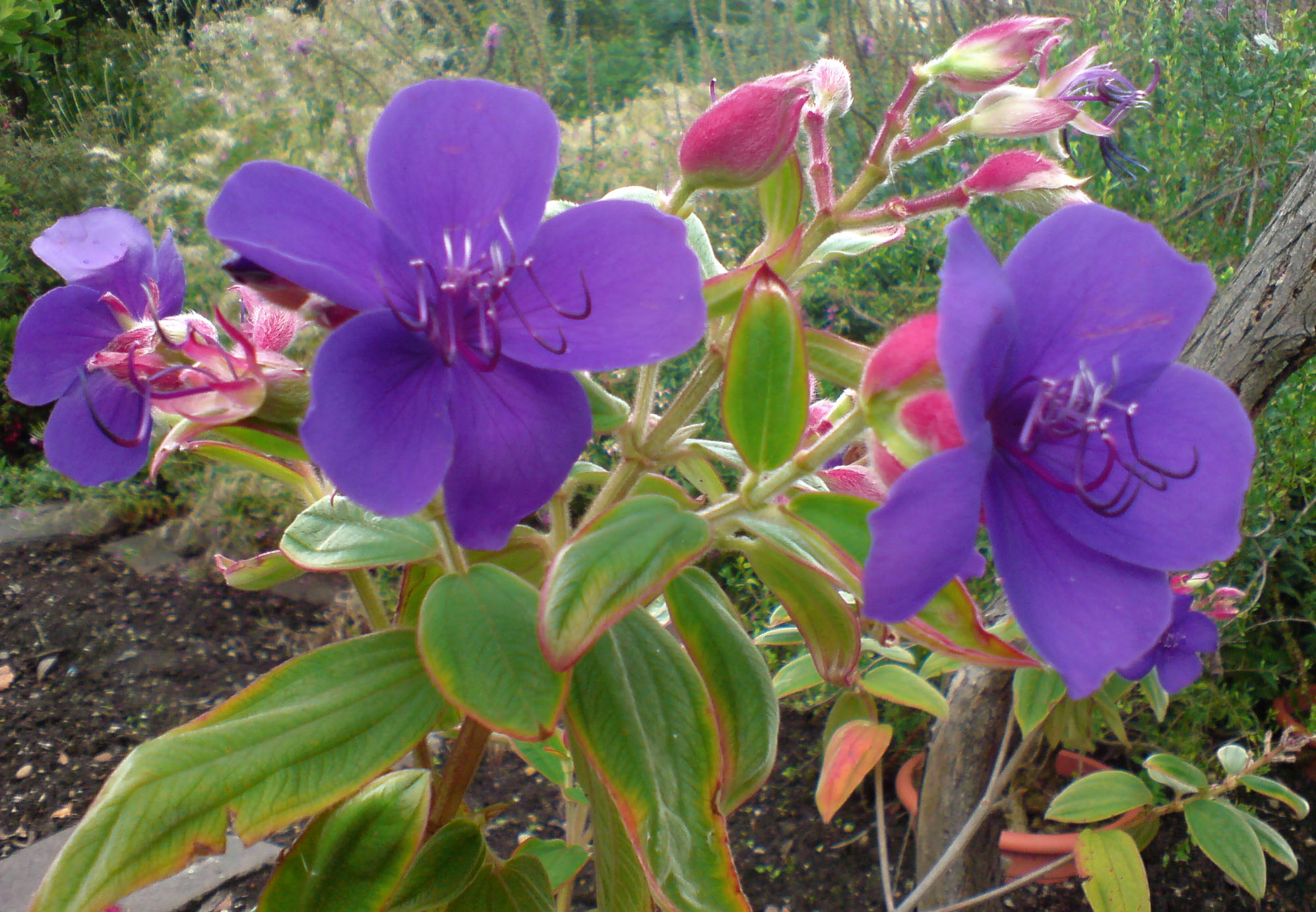

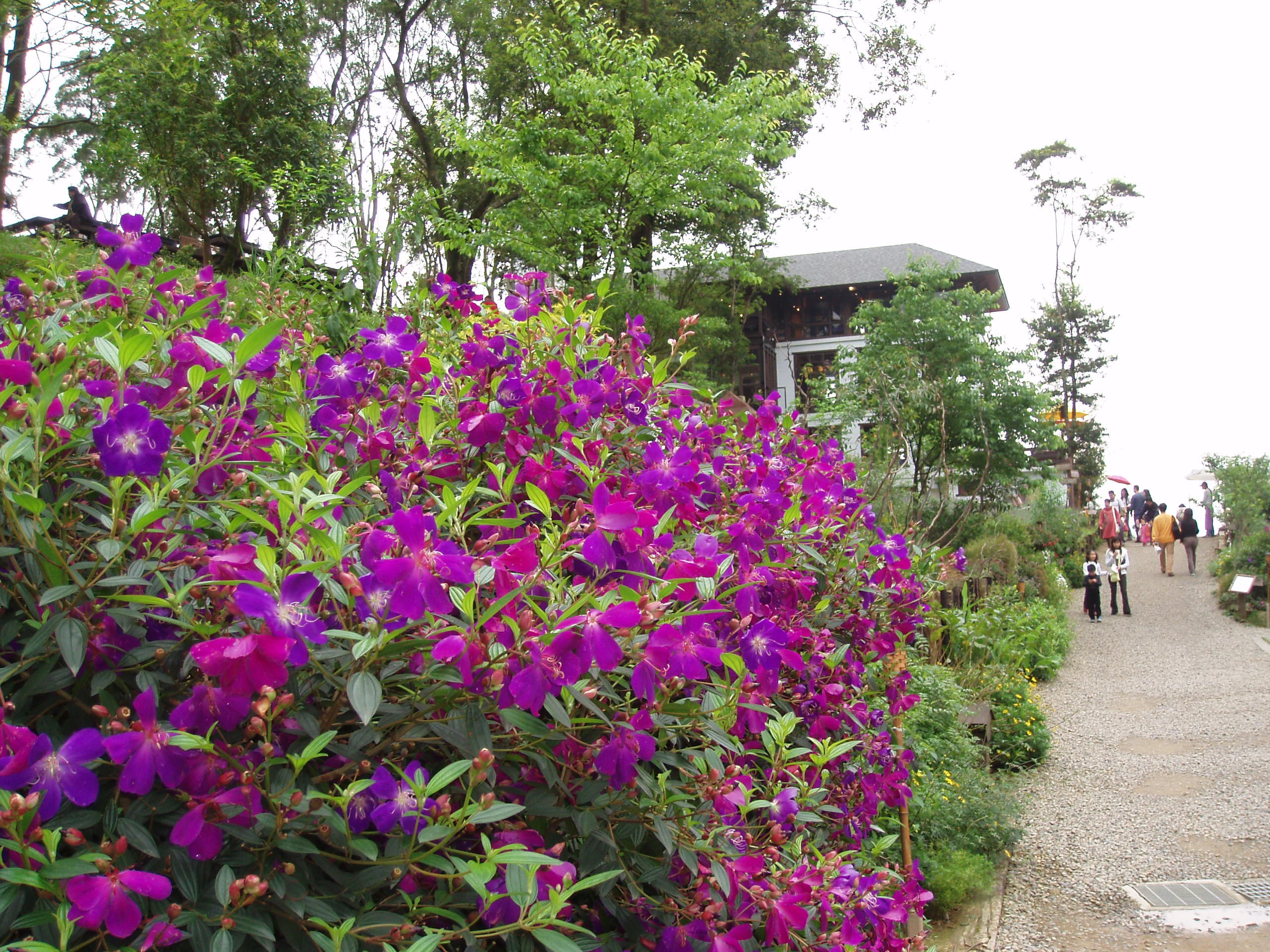
