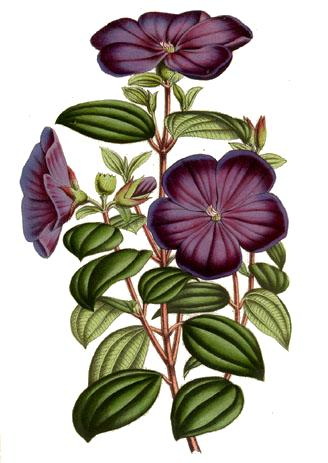

Scientific classification
- Kingdom: Plantae
- Clade: Tracheophytes
- Clade: Angiosperms
- Clade: Eudicots
- Clade: Rosids
- Order: Myrtales
- Family: Melastomataceae
- Genus: Pleroma
- Species: P. elegans

Binomial name
- Pleroma elegans Gardner

Synonyms
- Lasiandra elegans (Gardner) Naudin; Lasiandra imperatoris Wawra; Lasiandra weddellii Naudin; Pleroma weddellii (Naudin) Triana; Tibouchina elegans (Gardner) Cogn.; Tibouchina weddellii (Naudin) Cogn.

= Pleroma elegans =

Species of flowering plant

Pleroma elegans, synonym Tibouchina elegans, is an ornamental plant in the family Melastomataceae.

The plant is endemic to the Atlantic Forest ecoregion in southeastern Brazil.

In addition, this plant is cited in Flora Brasiliensis by Carl Friedrich Philipp von Martius.

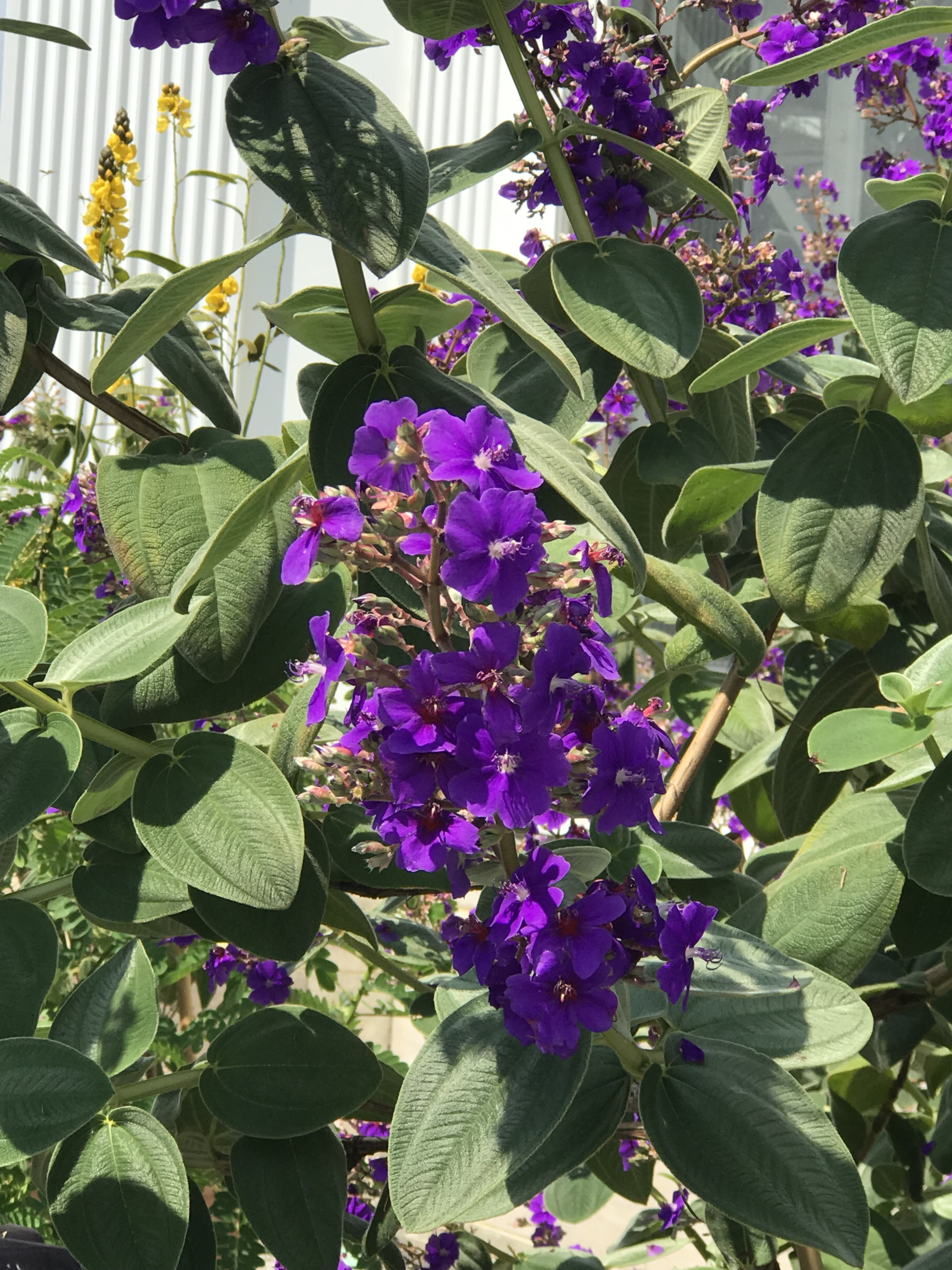
Growing in the New York Botanical Garden
