= Schisandra sphaerandra =

Scientific classification
- Kingdom: Plantae
- Clade: Embryophytes
- Clade: Tracheophytes
- Clade: Spermatophytes
- Clade: Angiosperms
- Order: Austrobaileyales
- Family: Schisandraceae
- Genus: Schisandra
- Species: S. sphaerandra

Binomial name
- Schisandra sphaerandra Stapf

Synonyms
- Schisandra grandiflora var. cathayensis C.K.Schneid.; Schisandra sphaerandra f. pallida A.C.Sm.

Species of flowering plant

Schisandra sphaerandra is a species of flowering plant in the family Schisandraceae. It is a climbing plant with woody vines, papery leaves, and solitary flowers that can be white, yellow, pink, red, or purple. The species is native to central China, and was described in 1928.

The species is used ornamentally, and in Chinese medicine.

== Taxonomy ==
The species was described by Otto Stapf in 1928. It forms a clade with Schisandra rubriflora, Schisandra incarnata, and Schisandra grandiflora.

== Distribution ==
Schisandra sphaerandra is native to the temperate biome of south-central China (southern Sichuan and northern Yunnan). It grows in mixed broadleaf forests, dominated by spruce and fir trees. The species is present at elevations of 2,700–3,600 metres (8,900–11,800 ft).

Schisandra sphaerandra is partially sympatric with Schisandra rubriflora.

== Description ==
Schisandra sphaerandra is a climbing plant with woody vines and elongated leaf-bearing branches. The leaves are papery or rarely subleathery in texture, and obovate-elliptical, elliptical, or ovate-elliptical in shape. The leaves are 3.5–8 centimetres (1.4–3.1 in) long, and 1.5–3 centimetres (0.59–1.18 in) wide. The leaf stem is 0.6–3.3 centimetres (0.24–1.30 in) long.

The flowers are solitary. The stems of male flowers are 0.5–2.4 centimetres (0.20–0.94 in) long, and the stems of female flowers are 0.6–4.4 centimetres (0.24–1.73 in) long. The male flowers have twenty-two to forty-two stamens, and the female flowers have seventy to one-hundred carpels. The flowers have five to nine tepals (normally six to seven in male flowers, and six to eight in female flowers), which can be white, yellowish, pink, crimson, dark red, or purplish. The plant flowers from May to August.

The fruits have 1.5–6.5 centimetres (0.59–2.56 in) long stems. The plant fruits from August to October. The seeds are more or less smooth.

Herbarium specimens have been mistaken for Schisandra grandiflora. Schisandra sphaerandra has smaller leaves, and greater variation in the colour of the perianth. Schisandra sphaerandra could also be mistaken for Schisandra neglecta.

== Uses ==
Schisandra sphaerandra is cultivated as an ornamental plant. The fruits are used in Chinese medicine.

== Nomenclature ==
In Chinese, the species is known as 球蕊五味子 (qiu rui wu wei zi).
