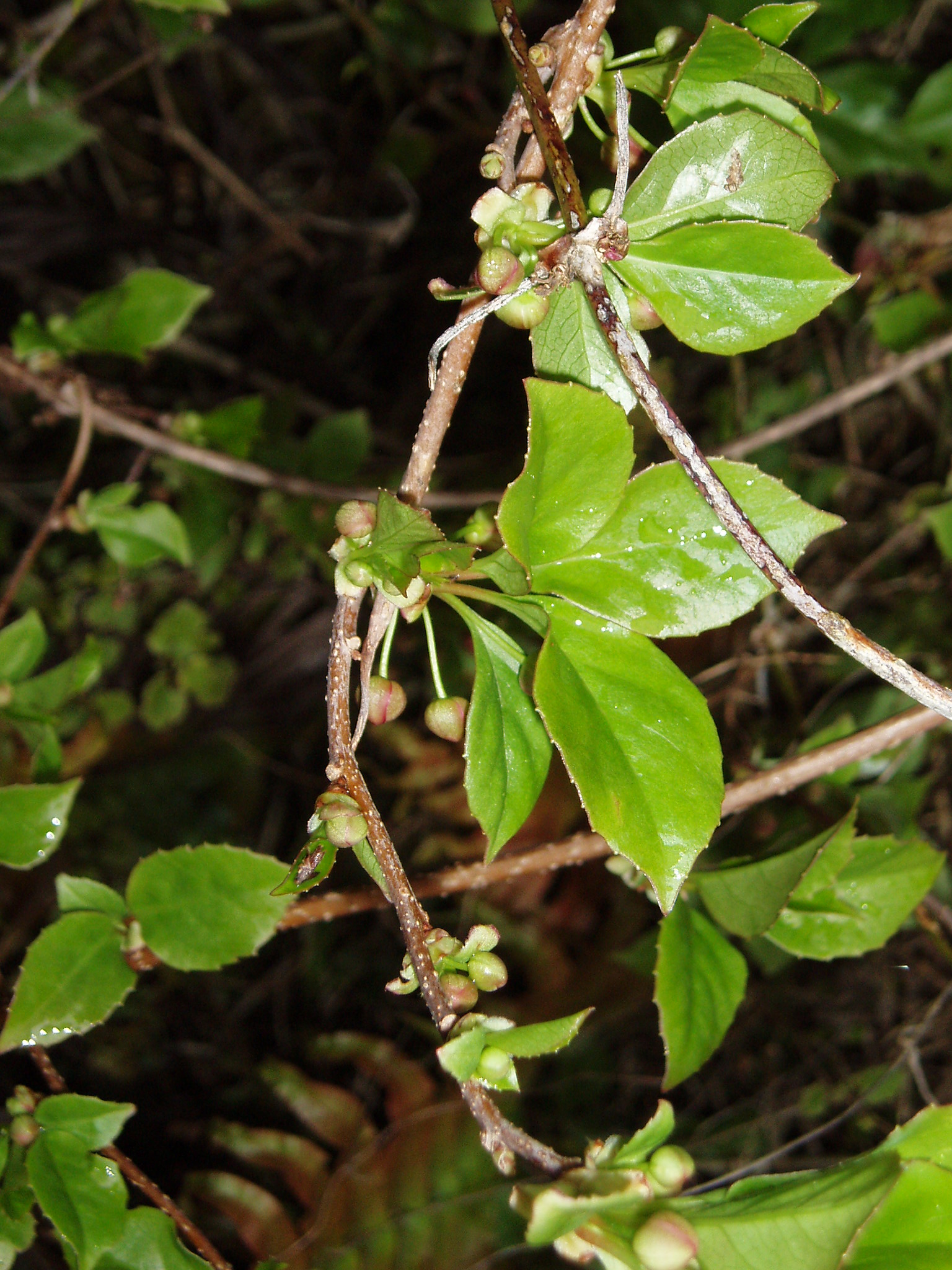

Scientific classification
- Kingdom: Plantae
- Clade: Embryophytes
- Clade: Tracheophytes
- Clade: Angiosperms
- Order: Austrobaileyales
- Family: Schisandraceae
- Genus: Schisandra
- Species: S. sphenanthera

Binomial name
- Schisandra sphenanthera Rehder & E.H.Wilson

Synonyms
- Schisandra chinensis var. rubriflora Franch.; Schisandra flaccidiramosa C.R.Sun; Schisandra grandiflora var. rubriflora (Franch.) C.K.Schneid.

= Schisandra sphenanthera =

Species of flowering plant

Schisandra sphenanthera, commonly known as orange magnolia vine, or lemonwood, is a species of flowering plant in the family Schisandraceae. It is a climbing plant with papery leaves, yellow to red flowers, and edible red berries. The species is native to forests in China.

Schisandra sphenanthera was described in 1913, and is used in horticulture, medicine, and wine-making.

== Taxonomy ==
The species was described by Alfred Rehder and Ernest Henry Wilson in 1913. Rehder and Wilson included elements representing Schisandra arisanensis subsp. viridis, Schisandra pubinervis, and Schisandra lancifolia. In 1934, Elmer Drew Merrill and Woon Young Chun described Schisandra sphenanthera var. longipes, which Richard M.K. Saunders placed as a distinct species in 2000.

Schisandra sphenanthera is closely related to Schisandra neglecta, Schisandra arisanensis, and Schisandra elongata.

== Distribution ==
Schisandra sphenanthera is native to the temperate biome of north-central, south-central, and south-east China. It is present in Anhui, Gansu, Guizhou, Henan, Hubei, Hunan, Jiangsu, Shaanxi, Shanxi, Sichuan, north-east Yunnan, and Zhejiang.

The species grows in forests and thickets, at elevations of 700–2,000 metres (2,300–6,600 ft). It grows in full sun, or partial shade, and in well-drained chalk, clay, loam, or sand.

== Description ==
Schisandra sphenanthera is a deciduous climbing wall shrub, that can reach 7 metres (23 ft) high. It lacks hairs. The leaf bearing branches are elongated.

The leaf stems are 1.5–3.5 centimetres (0.59–1.38 in) long. The leaves are papery in texture, elliptic, ovate, or obovate in shape, 4–11 centimetres (1.6–4.3 in) long, and 2–6 centimetres (0.79–2.36 in) wide. The leaf edges are finely toothed, serrated, or rarely smooth.

Schisandra sphenanthera is dioecious (each plant has only male or only female flowers), and is not self-fertile. The stems of male flowers are 0.8–5.4 centimetres (0.31–2.13 in) long, and the stems of female flowers are 1.8–6.4 centimetres (0.71–2.52 in) long. The flowers are pendulous, and have five to nine tepals, which are yellow, orange, or red. The outer tepals may be greenish-yellow. The largest tepals are 6–11.5 millimetres (0.24–0.45 in) long, and 3.5–8.5 millimetres (0.14–0.33 in) wide. The flowers are around 1.5 centimetres (0.59 in) wide. The male flowers have eleven to twenty-five stamens, and the female flowers have twenty-five to forty-five carpels. The plant flowers from April to July.

The fruits are scarlet-red berries. The fruit stems are 2–10 centimetres (0.79–3.94 in) long. The plant fruits from June to October. The seeds are disc-shaped or shaped like a flattened kidney bean, and have smooth cases. The plant takes five to ten years to reach maturity, and is hardy.

Schisandra sphenanthera may be confused with Schisandra incarnata, though the male flowers differ.

== Uses ==
Schisandra sphenanthera is cultivated as an ornamental plant. It is used in Chinese medicine. The plant produces edible fruit. In China, the fruit is used in the production of wine and vinegar. Oils from the fruits and seeds are used to make soap and lubricants.

== Nomenclature ==
In English, Schisandra sphenanthera is commonly known as "southern magnolia vine", "orange magnolia vine", or "lemonwood".

In Chinese, it is known as 華中五味子 (hua zhong wu wei zi), or 南五味子 (nan wu wei zi).
