= Schisandra cauliflora =

Scientific classification
- Kingdom: Plantae
- Clade: Embryophytes
- Clade: Tracheophytes
- Clade: Spermatophytes
- Clade: Angiosperms
- Order: Austrobaileyales
- Family: Schisandraceae
- Genus: Schisandra
- Species: S. cauliflora

Binomial name
- Schisandra cauliflora N.T.Cuong, D.V.Hai, N.Q.Hung & M.H.Dat

Species of flowering plant

Schisandra cauliflora is a species of flowering plant in the family Schisandraceae. It is native to Vietnam, and was described in 2019.

S. cauliflora is an evergreen liana with simple leaves. The flowers may grow directly from the branches or trunk.

== Taxonomy ==
The first description of the species was published in 2019, in Blumea. The type material was collected in 2004, in Bắc Kạn province, Vietnam. The specimens were collected by a team that included Daniel E. Atha.

Schisandra cauliflora is placed in the subgenus Sphaerostema.

== Distribution ==
It is native to the wet tropical biome of northern Vietnam. It grows on limestone or in soil, in evergreen forests, and is present at elevations of 180–800 metres (590–2,620 ft).

== Description ==
Schisandra cauliflora is a smooth, evergreen liana that grows up to 15 metres (49 ft) long. It may be monoecious or dioecious.

The leaves are simple, and arranged in a spiral. The leaves are 16–22 centimetres (6.3–8.7 in) long, 8–12 centimetres (3.1–4.7 in) wide, ovate to elliptical in shape, and subleathery. The leaves have eight to ten veins on each side, and grow on 6–8 centimetres (2.4–3.1 in) stems.

The flowers may grow directly from the branches or trunks (ramiflory and cauliflory). The flowers are in clusters of nine to seventeen, or are rarely solitary. The flowers have eleven to thirteen tepals, which range from green to yellow in colour. The male flowers have fourteen to seventeen stamens. The female flowers have twenty-two to thirty carpels. The plant flowers in June and July.

The seeds are yellow, flattened ellipsoids with a smooth case. The plant fruits from August to October.

Schisandra cauliflora has similar stamens to Schisandra propinqua, and similar leaves and fruits to S. macrocarpa.
