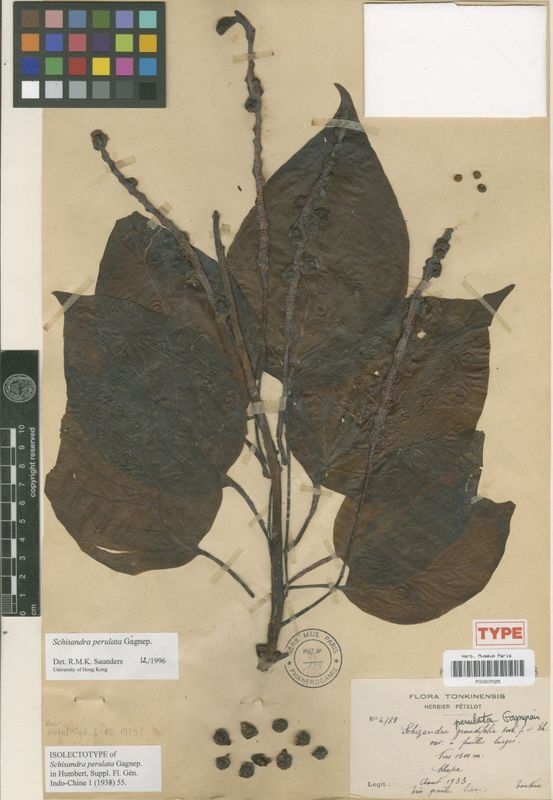

Scientific classification
- Kingdom: Plantae
- Clade: Embryophytes
- Clade: Tracheophytes
- Clade: Spermatophytes
- Clade: Angiosperms
- Order: Austrobaileyales
- Family: Schisandraceae
- Genus: Schisandra
- Species: S. perulata

Binomial name
- Schisandra perulata Gagnep.

= Schisandra perulata =

Species of flowering plant

Schisandra perulata is a species of flowering plant in the family Schisandraceae. It is a climbing plant with thin leaves, and solitary, yellow-red flowers. The species is native to Thailand and Vietnam, and was described in 1939.

== Taxonomy ==
François Gagnepain described the species in 1939.

Schisandra perulata forms a clade with S. henryi and S. longipes. Within Schisandra, it is part of the subgenus Pleiostema.

== Distribution ==
Schisandra perulata is native to northern Thailand and northern Vietnam. It grows in evergreen forests, at elevations of 1,400–1,500 metres (4,600–4,900 ft).

== Description ==
Schisandra perulata is a climbing plant with woody vines.

The leaves are thin, elliptic and ovate, 12–14.5 centimetres (4.7–5.7 in) long, and 6.5–8.5 centimetres (2.6–3.3 in) wide. The edges are finely toothed, finely serrated, or smooth. The leaf stems are 16–40 millimetres (0.63–1.57 in) long.

The flowers are solitary. The male flowers have twenty-two to thirty stamens, and seven or eight yellow to red tepals. The outermost tepals are ovate, and the innermost tepals are obovate. The flower stems are 26–66 millimetres (1.0–2.6 in) long.

The fruits grow on 12–14 centimetres (4.7–5.5 in) stems. The plant is likely in fruit in August.
