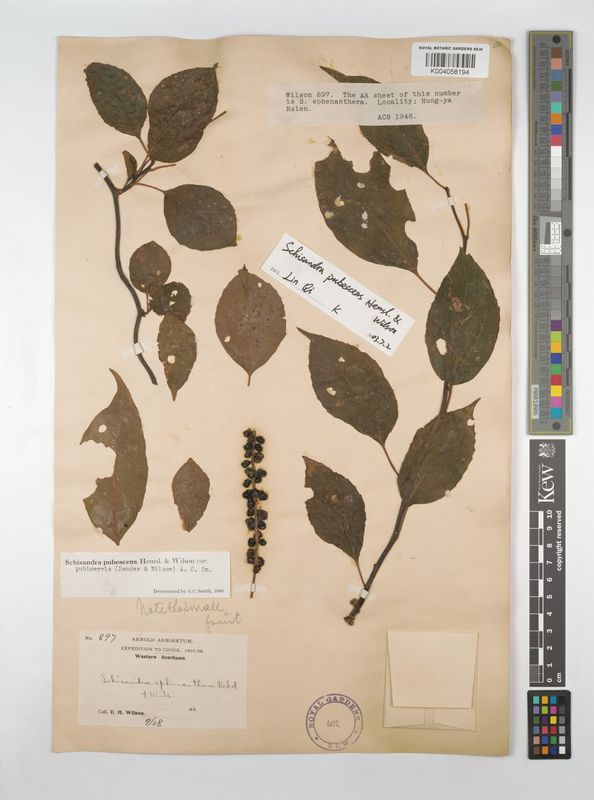

Scientific classification
- Kingdom: Plantae
- Clade: Embryophytes
- Clade: Tracheophytes
- Clade: Spermatophytes
- Clade: Angiosperms
- Order: Austrobaileyales
- Family: Schisandraceae
- Genus: Schisandra
- Species: S. pubinervis

Binomial name
- Schisandra pubinervis (Rehder & E.H.Wilson) R.M.K.Saunders

Synonyms
- Schisandra pubescens var. pubinervis (Rehder & E.H.Wilson) A.C.Sm.; Schisandra sphenanthera var. pubinervis Rehder & E.H.Wilson

= Schisandra pubinervis =

Species of flowering plant

Schisandra pubinervis is a species of flowering plant in the family Schisandraceae. It is a climbing plant with woody vines, papery leaves, and yellow flowers. The species is native to south-central China.

Schisandra pubinervis was described in 1913.

== Taxonomy ==
Schisandra pubinervis was described in 1913, by Alfred Rehder and Ernest Henry Wilson. It was initially placed as a variety of Schisandra sphenanthera. In 1947, Albert Charles Smith described it as a variety of Schisandra pubescens. In 2000, Richard M.K. Saunders placed it as a distinct species.

Schisandra pubinervis forms a clade with Schisandra pubescens and Schisandra tomentella.

== Distribution ==
Schisandra pubinervis is native to the temperate biome of south-central China (Sichuan to Hubei). The species grows in forests and thickets, at elevations of 1,000–2,000 metres (3,300–6,600 ft).

== Description ==
Schisandra pubinervis is a climbing plant with woody vines. The leaf-bearing branches are elongated.

The leaves are papery, elliptical to ovate, 5–11 centimetres (2.0–4.3 in) long, and 3–7 centimetres (1.2–2.8 in) wide. The leaf stems are 1–4 centimetres (0.39–1.57 in) long.

The flowers are solitary. The stems of male inflorescences are 2.8–5.2 centimetres (1.1–2.0 in) long, and the stems of female inflorescences are 5–6 centimetres (2.0–2.4 in) long. The male flowers have seven to eight tepals, and the female flowers have eight to ten tepals. The tepals are yellow. The largest tepals are 6.5–10 millimetres (0.26–0.39 in) long, and 6.5–9 millimetres (0.26–0.35 in) wide. The male flowers have fourteen to nineteen stamens, and the female flowers have thirty-six to fifty carpels. The plant flowers from June to July.

The fruit stems are 4–10 centimetres (1.6–3.9 in) long. The plant fruits from July to August. The seeds are smooth or finely wrinkled.

Schisandra pubinervis resembles Schisandra sphenanthera.

== Nomenclature ==
In Chinese, the species is known as 毛脈五味子 (mao mai wu wei zi).
