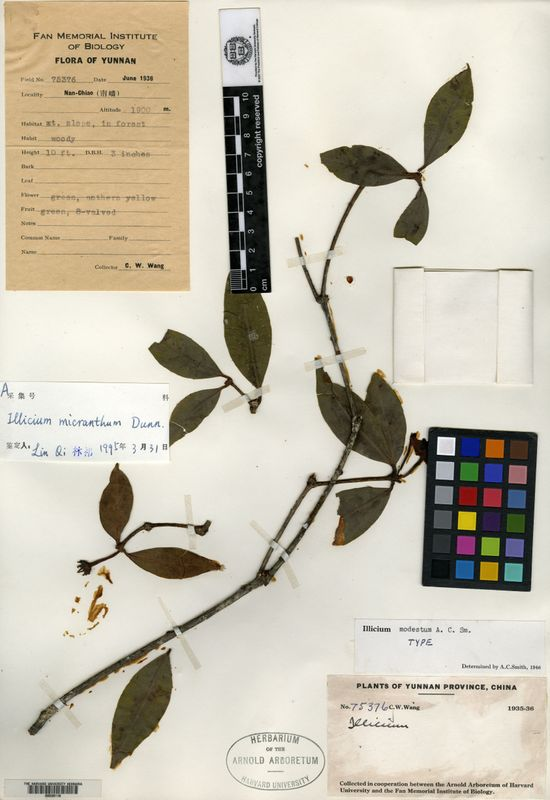

Scientific classification
- Kingdom: Plantae
- Clade: Embryophytes
- Clade: Tracheophytes
- Clade: Spermatophytes
- Clade: Angiosperms
- Order: Austrobaileyales
- Family: Schisandraceae
- Genus: Illicium
- Species: I. modestum

Binomial name
- Illicium modestum A.C.Sm.

= Illicium modestum =

Species of flowering plant

Illicium modestum is a species of flowering plant in the family Schisandraceae. It is a shrub or tree with leathery leaves and grenish-yellow tepals. I. modestum is native to China, and was described in 1947.

== Taxonomy ==
The species was described by Albert Charles Smith in 1947.

== Distribution ==
Illicium modestum is native to the subtropical biome of Yunnan, China. It grows on forest slopes, at elevations of around 1,900 metres (6,200 ft).

== Description ==
Illicium modestum is a shrub or tree up to 3 metres (9.8 ft) high.

The leaves are in clusters of two or three. The leaves are leathery, narrowly oblong-elliptic, 5–7.5 centimetres (2.0–3.0 in) long, and 1.5–2.5 centimetres (0.59–0.98 in) wide. The leaf stems are 3–4 millimetres (0.12–0.16 in) long.

The flower stem is 0.9–1.7 centimetres (0.35–0.67 in) long. The flowers have around nineteen tepals, which are papery and greenish-yellow. The largest tepals are 8–9 millimetres (0.31–0.35 in) long, and 5–6 millimetres (0.20–0.24 in) wide. The flowers have around seventeen stamens, and around twelve carpels. The plant flowers in June.

Illicium modestum appears similar to Illicium brevistylum, though the former has more perianth segments, and smaller leaves. I. modestum has similar foliage and carpels to Illicium micranthum, though I. modestum has larger flowers.

== Nomenclature ==
In Chinese, the species is known as 滇南八角 (dian nan ba jiao).
