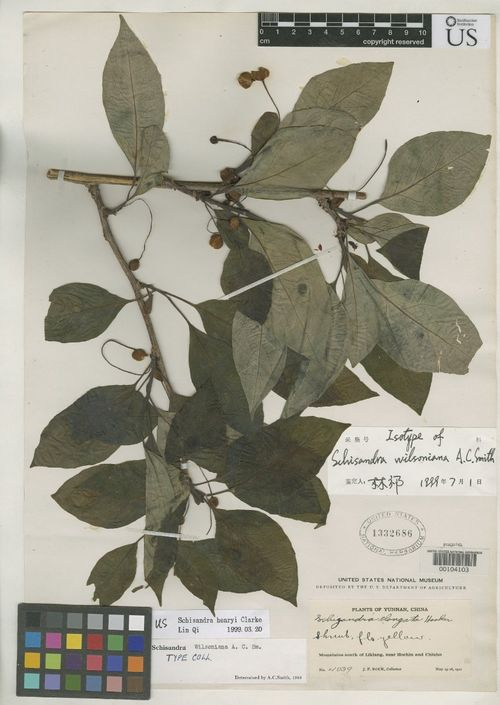

Scientific classification
- Kingdom: Plantae
- Clade: Embryophytes
- Clade: Tracheophytes
- Clade: Spermatophytes
- Clade: Angiosperms
- Order: Austrobaileyales
- Family: Schisandraceae
- Genus: Schisandra
- Species: S. bicolor

Binomial name
- Schisandra bicolor W.C.Cheng

Synonyms
- Schisandra bicolor var. tuberculata (Y.W.Law) Y.W.Law; Schisandra tuberculata Y.W.Law; Schisandra wilsoniana A.C.Sm.

= Schisandra bicolor =

Species of flowering plant

Schisandra bicolor is a species of flowering plant in the family Schisandraceae. The species is native to southern China, and was named in 1932.

Schisandra bicolor is a climbing plant with papery to subleathery leaves. It is used in medicine.

== Distribution ==
Schisandra bicolor is native to the subtropical biome of southern China. The species grows in forests in the provinces of Guangxi, Hunan, Yunnan, and Zhejiang, at elevations of 700–1,300 metres (2,300–4,300 ft).

== Description ==
Schisandra bicolor is a climbing plant. The plant is hairless throughout.

The leaves are papery or subleathery in texture, and elliptical to obovate-elliptical in shape. The leaves are 7–12 centimetres (2.8–4.7 in) long, and 3.5–8 centimetres (1.4–3.1 in) wide. The leaves grow on 1.3–6.7 centimetres (0.51–2.64 in) long stems.

The flowers have six to eleven tepals. The outer tepals are greenish-white to yellow, and the inner tepals are reddish-purple. The male flowers have five stamens. The female flowers have fifty-two to seventy-five carpels. The stems of the male inflorescences are 1.7–4.2 centimetres (0.67–1.65 in), and the stems of the female inflorescences are 5–5.5 centimetres (2.0–2.2 in). The plant flowers from May to July.

The plants fruit from August to November. The fruits grow on 2.5–6.5 centimetres (0.98–2.56 in) stems.

== Uses ==
Schisandra bicolor is used in medicine.

== Nomenclature ==
In Chinese, Schisandra bicolor is known as 二色五味子 (er se wu wei zi).
