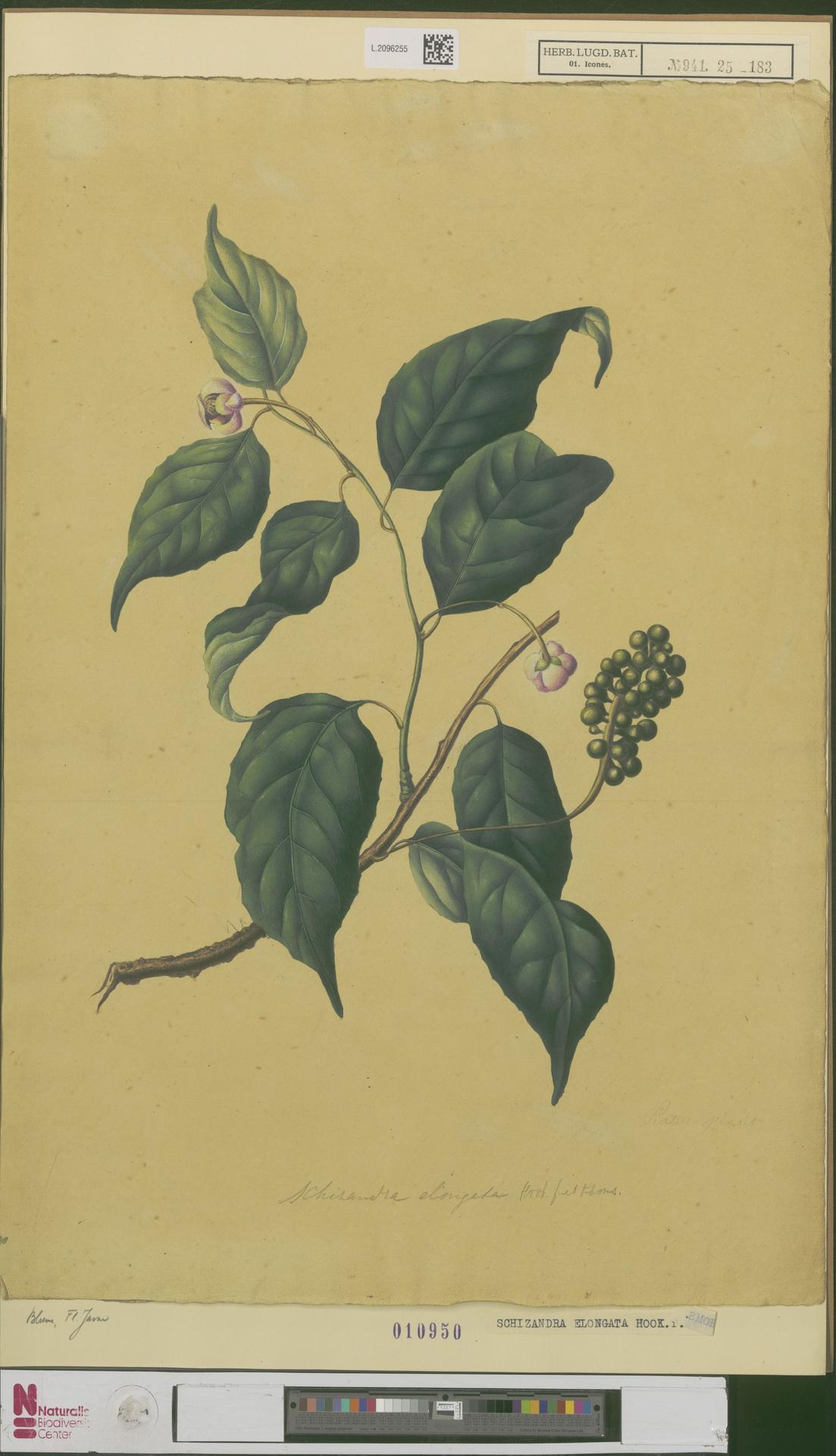
- Illustration

Scientific classification
- Kingdom: Plantae
- Clade: Embryophytes
- Clade: Tracheophytes
- Clade: Spermatophytes
- Clade: Angiosperms
- Order: Austrobaileyales
- Family: Schisandraceae
- Genus: Schisandra
- Species: S. elongata

Binomial name
- Schisandra elongata (Blume) Baill.

Synonyms
- Sphaerostema elongatum Blume; Schisandra elongata var. marmorata Hallier f.

= Schisandra elongata =

Species of flowering plant

Schisandra elongata is a species of flowering plant in the family Schisandraceae. It is a woody climbing plant with yellowish flowers. The species is native to Java, and was described in 1825.

== Distribution ==
Schisandra elongata is native to the wet tropical biome of Java.

== Taxonomy ==
In 1825, Carl Ludwig Blume described Sphaerostema elongatum, a synonym of Schisandra elongata. In 1898, Johannes Gottfried Hallier described the species as Schisandra elongata var. marmorata. In 1868, Henri Ernest Baillon became the first to publish the name Schisandra elongata.

== Description ==
Schisandra elongata is a woody climbing plant with slender branches. The leaves are ovate in shape, and may be minutely toothed. They measure 3–4 inches (7.6–10.2 cm) long, and 1.5–2 inches (3.8–5.1 cm) wide.

The flowers are yellowish, and may be arranged in fascicles, or solitary. They are smaller than those of Schisandra grandiflora. The fruits are 2–3 inches (5.1–7.6 cm) in diameter.
