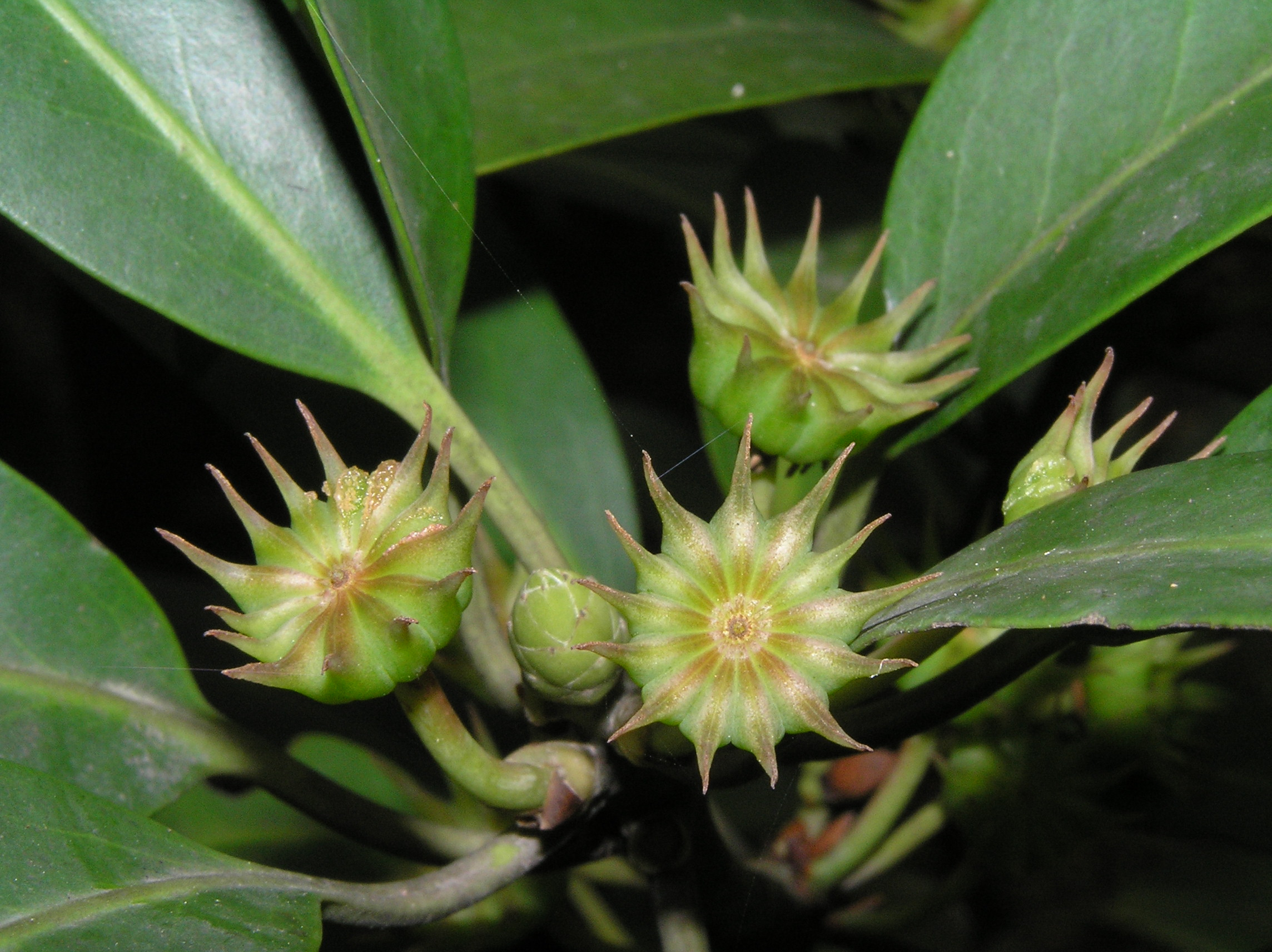

Scientific classification
- Kingdom: Plantae
- Clade: Tracheophytes
- Clade: Angiosperms
- Order: Austrobaileyales
- Family: Schisandraceae
- Genus: Illicium
- Species: I. angustisepalum

Binomial name
- Illicium angustisepalum A.C.Sm.

Synonyms
- Illicium jiadifengpi f. minwanense (B.N.Chang & S.D.Zhang) Q.Lin; Illicium minwanense B.N.Chang & S.D.Zhang; Illicium wuyishanum Q.Lin

= Illicium angustisepalum =

Species of flowering plant

Illicium angustisepalum, commonly known as the Lantau star-anise, is a species of flowering plant in the family Schisandraceae. The species is native to south east China.

Illicium angustisepalum is a tree with white or yellow flowers. It was described in 1947.

== Distribution ==
Illicium angustisepalum is native to the subtropical biome of south-east China, in Anhui, Fujian, and Guangdong. It grows on the sides of ravines, at the margins of forests, at elevations of 1,000–1,900 metres (3,300–6,200 ft).

The type locality is Hong Kong's Lantau island.

== Description ==
Illicium angustisepalum is a tree that grows up to 11 metres (36 ft) high. The leaves are leathery, oblong or elliptical in shape, and 7–12 centimetres (2.8–4.7 in) long, and 2–4 centimetres (0.79–1.57 in) wide. Leaves grow in clusters of three to six, on stalks 1–2.5 centimetres (0.39–0.98 in) long.

The flowers are white to pale-yellow. The flower stalks are 0.5–2 centimetres (0.20–0.79 in) long. The fruits grow on 1–2.3 centimetres (0.39–0.91 in) stalks. The seeds are 5–8.5 millimetres (0.20–0.33 in) long.

Illicium angustisepalum flowers from February to April, and fruits from September to October.
