= Schisandra micrantha =

Scientific classification
- Kingdom: Plantae
- Clade: Tracheophytes
- Clade: Angiosperms
- Order: Austrobaileyales
- Family: Schisandraceae
- Genus: Schisandra
- Species: S. micrantha

Binomial name
- Schisandra micrantha A.C.Sm.

Synonyms
- Schisandra gracilis A. C. Smith; Schisandra elongata var. dentata Finet & Gagnep.

Species of plant

Schisandra micrantha is a species of climbing plant in the family Schisandraceae. It was first published by A.C. Smith in the journal Sargentia in 1947. This species is accepted and is native to the area stretching from Assam in Manipur to China's Yunnan province, primarily growing in the temperate biome. Its natural range includes Assam, China South-Central, and Myanmar.

The plant blooms from May to July, while the fruiting period is from August to September.

Schisandra micrantha is usually found in forests, often near rivers, at altitudes ranging from 1200-2900 m. The plant has medicinal properties and is used for various purposes.
