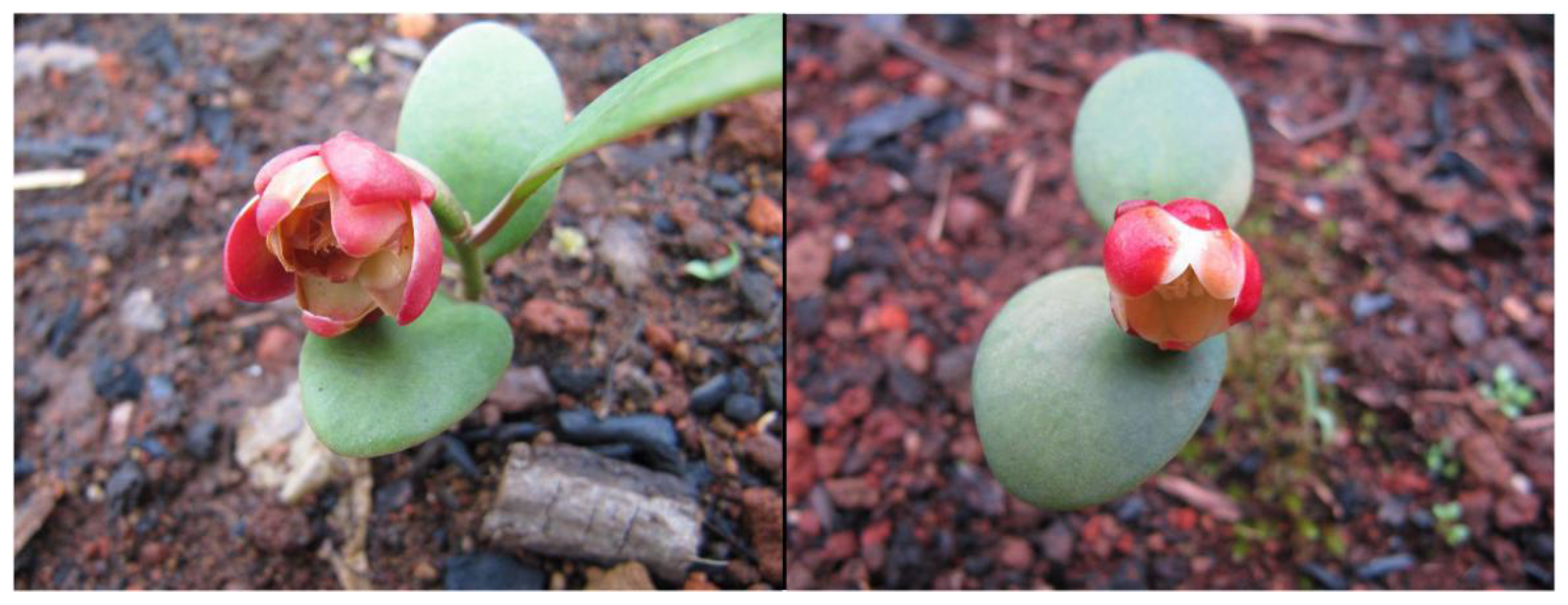

Scientific classification
- Kingdom: Plantae
- Clade: Tracheophytes
- Clade: Angiosperms
- Order: Austrobaileyales
- Family: Schisandraceae
- Genus: Illicium
- Species: I. difengpi

Binomial name
- Illicium difengpi B.N.Chang

= Illicium difengpi =

Species of evergreen shrub

Illicium difengpi is an evergreen shrub, belonging to the family Schisandraceae. It is endemic to the southwestern region of China, mainly in the Guangxi province. The plant is best known for its medicinal properties, but it is also highly valued for its scientific, ecological, and ornamental value. Today, the species is highly protected and researched to conserve its wild populations.

== Distribution ==
Illicium difengpi is mainly found in the karst mountain regions of Guangxi province. The species can be found throughout the region, but its largest distribution is in southwestern area of the province. The plant can also be found in smaller distributions in the Yunnan province, a region located to the west of Guangxi, and in Vietnam.

== Habitat and ecology ==
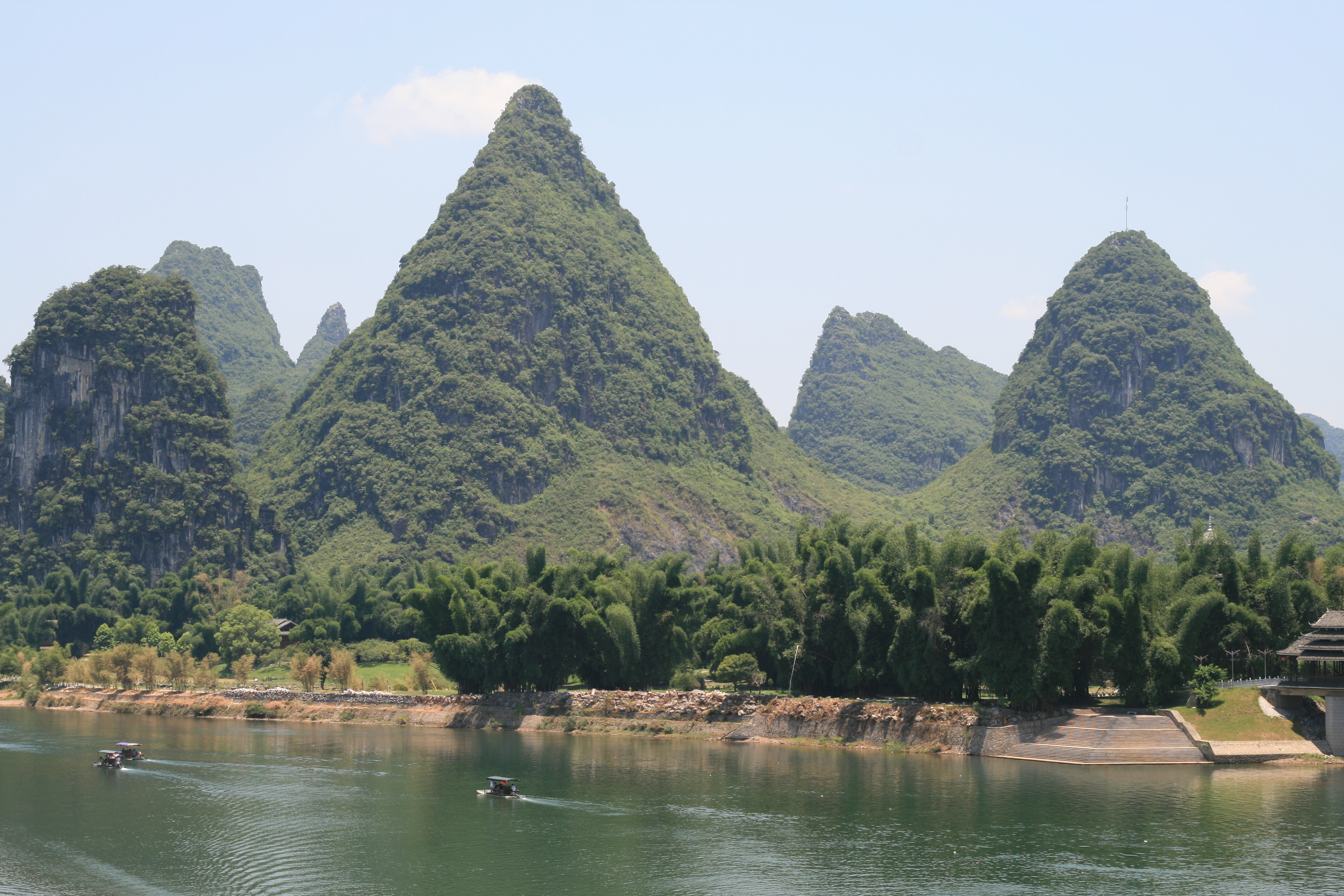
Karst mountains in Guangxi Province, China

Illicium difengpi grows on top of karst hills and in the sparse forests along the slopes of these rocky hills. These hills are composed of highly soluble rock such as limestone, which leads to the creation of depressions and sinkholes within the formation. The plant can be found between altitudes of 450 to 1200 meters, but are most frequently found between the 500 to 800 meters range. In this habitat, the rocky terrain, along with the threat of drought, high temperatures, and high salinity make for a harsh growing environment. Due to the nature of the karst environment, the rock formations are prone to deterioration and erosion over time. More so, the karst mountains in southern China have rocky desertification. The combination of drought and high temperatures aggravates the desertification of the karst environment, which threatens the I. difengpi population in the area.

== Morphology ==
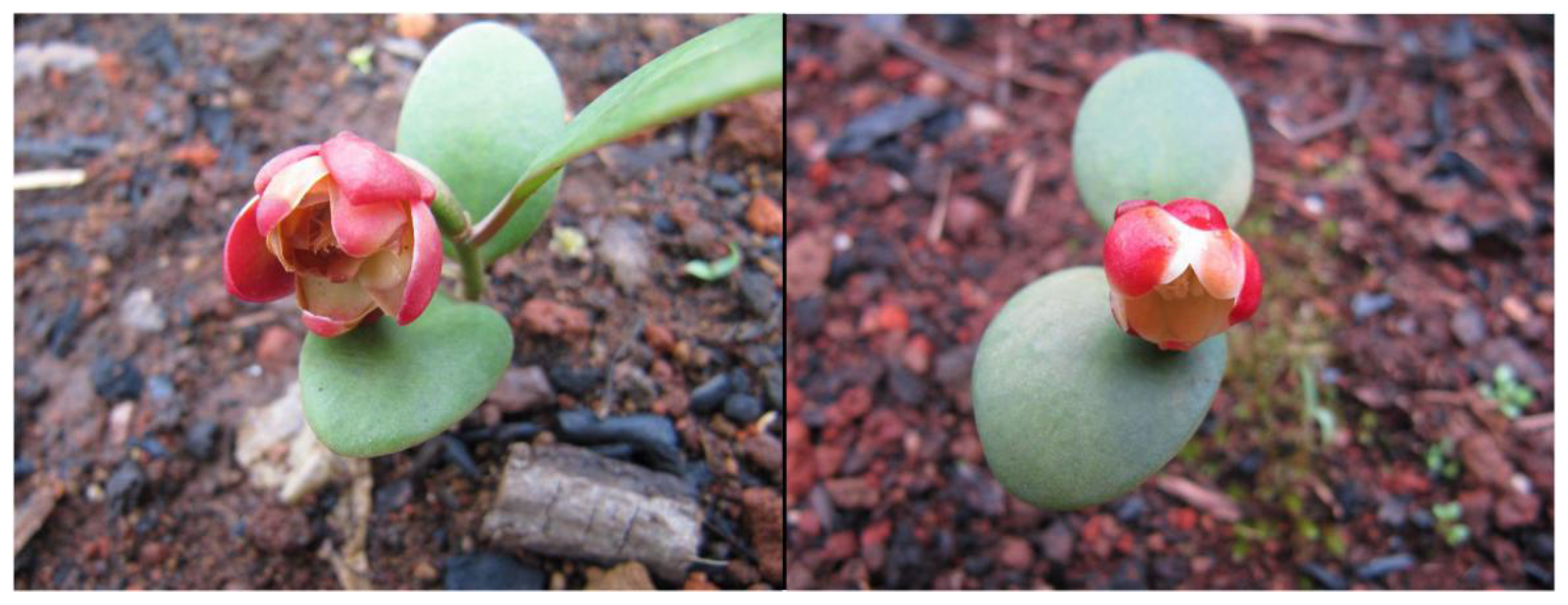
The flowering of I. difengpi in its natural habitat

The plant is an evergreen shrub that commonly grows 2 to 3 meters, but can grow as tall as 7 meters. The bark of the I. difengpi plant is 5 to 15 cm in length, 1 to 4 cm in diameter, and 0.2 to 0.3 cm in thickness. The outer surface of the bark is pale to dark brown, while the inner surface is brown to brownish red with longitudinal wrinkles. The bark is brittle and prone to falling off. The bark, which is often used in medicine, has a slight aromatic smell and bitter taste. In fact, the entire plant has an aromatic fragrance. The roots of the plant are cylindrical and display a dark reddish-brown outer skin and reddish-brown inner skin. The leaves are alternating and grow in clusters of 3 to 5 at the distal nodes or tips of branches. They are thick and leathery, texture-wise.

=== Flowers and fruit ===
Flowers of the I. difengpi plant are red and grow in clusters of 2 to 4. Each flower has 15 to 20 tepals, 21 to 23 stamens, and 13 carpels when flowering. The stigma is diamond-shaped. The style is 2.5 to 3.5 mm long. The fruit of the plant is an aggregate with 9 to 11 mature carpels and measures 2.5 to 3 cm in diameter. Young fruits of the plant are red. Seeds of the I. difengpi are yellow, ovoid, and 6 to 7 cm long.

== Usage ==
=== Medicinal ===
The stem, roots, and bark of the I. difengpi plant contain medicinal ingredients such as balletic glycoside and magnolol, which is used to treat rheumatoid arthritis, lumbar muscle strain, and traumatic injuries. Chemical compounds in the plant, such as triterpenoids, neolignans, and amides exhibit anti-inflammatory and anticonvulsant properties. I. difengpi is listed in Chinese Pharmacopoeia and is used extensively in traditional Chinese medicine for rheumatic ailments. The plant is still being studied to discover further medicinal value.

=== Scientific value ===
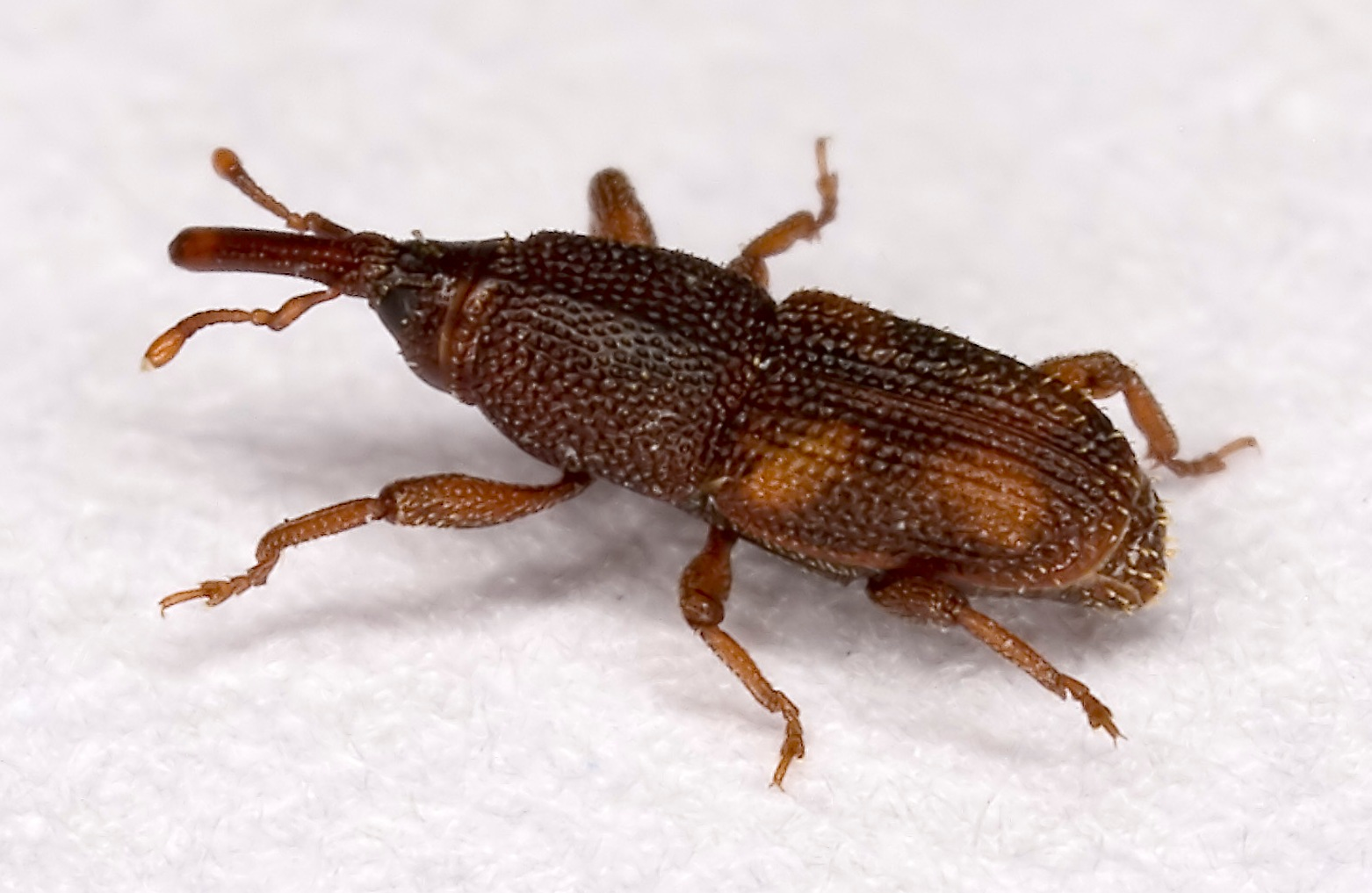
Sitophilus oryzae, rice weevil

The I. difengpi plant is native to the karst mountains of the Guangxi region of China. Within this environment, the plant grows in areas where it is mainly composed of rocky formations. The area is also susceptible to drought and high temperatures. As such, this plant is being researched to understand its ability to survive and grow in such a harsh environment.

The I. difengpi plant also has ecological value due to its unique characteristics. It can be used to restore areas that have been affected by rocky desertification and promote ecological stability. However, the species' population is being threatened due to over-harvesting, increasing global temperatures, and irresponsible land usage. Intensive cultivation and research is being proposed to help conserve and reintroduce the species into the region. The species has been cultivated in various karst mountainous regions in hopes of restoring areas affected by rocky desertification, protecting endemic medicinal plants, and boosting local economic development. In addition, chemical extracts from the plant have shown to have an antagonistic effect on two agricultural pests, Sitophilus oryzae and Tribolium confusum. This aspect of the plant is currently being applied to agroecological practices.

=== Ornamental value ===
The distinctive characteristics of the I. difengpi plant have made it an ornamental plant. The leaves of the plant are red when young and become dark green as they mature. The leaves have an alternating pattern and exhibit various shapes, from oblong to obovate-elliptic, and oblanceolate. The flowers grow in clusters of 2 to 5 on the tops of the branches. When blooming, the flowers display 13 carpels in a circle. These physical characteristics make the plant highly valued for its ornamental potential.
