= Illicium burmanicum =

Conservation status
- Least Concern (IUCN 3.1)

Scientific classification
- Kingdom: Plantae
- Clade: Tracheophytes
- Clade: Angiosperms
- Order: Austrobaileyales
- Family: Schisandraceae
- Genus: Illicium
- Species: I. burmanicum

Binomial name
- Illicium burmanicum E.H.Wilson

Species of flowering plant

Illicium burmanicum is a species of flowering plant in the family Schisandraceae. It is native to wet forests in Myanmar and China.

Illicium burmanicum is a shrub or tree, with papery leaves, and white to purple tepals. The species was described in 1926. The IUCN lists it as of least loncern, though it may be affected by habitat loss.

== Taxonomy ==
The species was described by Ernest Henry Wilson in 1926.

== Distribution ==
Illicium burmanicum is native to the wet tropical biome of Myanmar and to west Yunnan, China. It is found in wet forests, at elevations of 2,300–2,700 metres (7,500–8,900 ft).

Its extent of occurrence is around 104,857 square kilometres (40,486 sq mi).

== Description ==
Illicium burmanicum is a tree or shrub, that grows up to 12 metres (39 ft) tall.

The leaves are in clusters of four to ten. The leaves are papery in texture, and oblong-lanceolate, obovate-oblong, or lanceolate in shape. The leaves are 7–12 centimetres (2.8–4.7 in) long, and 2.5–4 centimetres (0.98–1.57 in) wide.

The flowers have twenty to twenty-seven tepals, which are white to purple in colour. The outer and inner tepals are oblong-elliptic to elliptic. The largest tepals are oblong-obovate and papery. The flowers have twenty to twenty-four stamens, and eight to twelve carpels. The flowers grow on 3–10 millimetres (0.12–0.39 in) stems.

Illicium burmanicum flowers from April to November, and fruits in August.

== Conservation ==
In 2022, the IUCN assessed Illicium burmanicum as a species of least concern, although it is threatened by deforestation and habitat loss. Some subpopulations are threatened by urban development. The species is not known to be present in any protected areas.
