= Illicium griffithii =

Conservation status
- Endangered (IUCN 3.1)

Scientific classification
- Kingdom: Plantae
- Clade: Tracheophytes
- Clade: Angiosperms
- Order: Austrobaileyales
- Family: Schisandraceae
- Genus: Illicium
- Species: I. griffithii

Binomial name
- Illicium griffithii Hook.f. & Thomson

Varieties
- Illicium griffithii var. cambodianum (Hance) Finet & Gagnep.; Illicium griffithii var. griffithii

Synonyms
- Badianifera griffithii (Hook.f. & Thomson) Kuntze

Species of flowering plant

Illicium griffithii is a species of flowering plant in the family Schisandraceae. It is a tree with leathery leaves, and twenty-five or twenty-six tepals on each flower. The species is native to south Asia, and was described in 1855.

Illicium griffithii is used in medicine and construction, and is listed as Endangered by the IUCN.

== Taxonomy ==
The species was described by Joseph Dalton Hooker and Thomas Thomson in 1855.

Two varieties are recognised:

- Illicium griffithii var. cambodianum (Hance) Finet & Gagnep. - native to Cambodia and Vietnam
- Illicium griffithii var. griffithii - native to India (Assam), Cambodia, Malaysia, and Myanmar

== Distribution ==
Illicium griffithii is native to the subtropical biome of India (Assam), Cambodia, Malaysia, Myanmar, and Vietnam. It grows in forests at elevations of 1,200–1,800 metres (3,900–5,900 ft).

Illicium griffithii is found in association with Quercus lamellosa, Gamblea ciliata, Machilus robustus, and Exbucklandia populnea.

== Description ==
Illicium griffithii is an evergreen tree that grows up to 30 feet (360 in) high.

The leaves are leathery, oblong-elliptic to narrowly obovate-elliptic, 7–13 centimetres (2.8–5.1 in) long, and 2–5.5 centimetres (0.79–2.17 in) wide. The leaves grow in clusters of three to five, on 0.7–1.7 centimetres (0.28–0.67 in) stems.

The flowers have twenty-five or twenty-six tepals. The inner tepals are fleshy, oblong-obovate, 4–10 millimetres (0.16–0.39 in) long, and 2.5–10 millimetres (0.098–0.394 in) wide. The outer tepals are papery or thinly leathery. The flowers have around thirty stamens, and twelve or thirteen carpels. The plant flowers from April to May.

The fruit stems are 1.5–4.7 centimetres (0.59–1.85 in) long. The fruits have twelve or thirteen follicles. The seeds are around 7 millimetres (0.28 in) long, 5 millimetres (0.20 in) wide, and 2–2.5 millimetres (0.079–0.098 in) thick. The plant fruits from October to December.

Its generation time is twenty-eight years.

== Uses ==
The fruits are harvested for spice, and are aromatic, bitter and astringent. The fruits are also used medicinally as a carminative and a stimulant. They may be a source of shikimic acid and antibacterial chemicals.

The seeds are sold in local markets in India.

The wood is used for firewood, and is used to construct poles and beams in housing.

== Conservation ==
In 2014, the IUCN assessed Illicium griffithii as Endangered.

== Nomenclature ==
In English, Illicium griffithii is commonly known as "Himalayan star anise". In Chinese, it is known as 西藏八角 (xi cang ba jiao).
