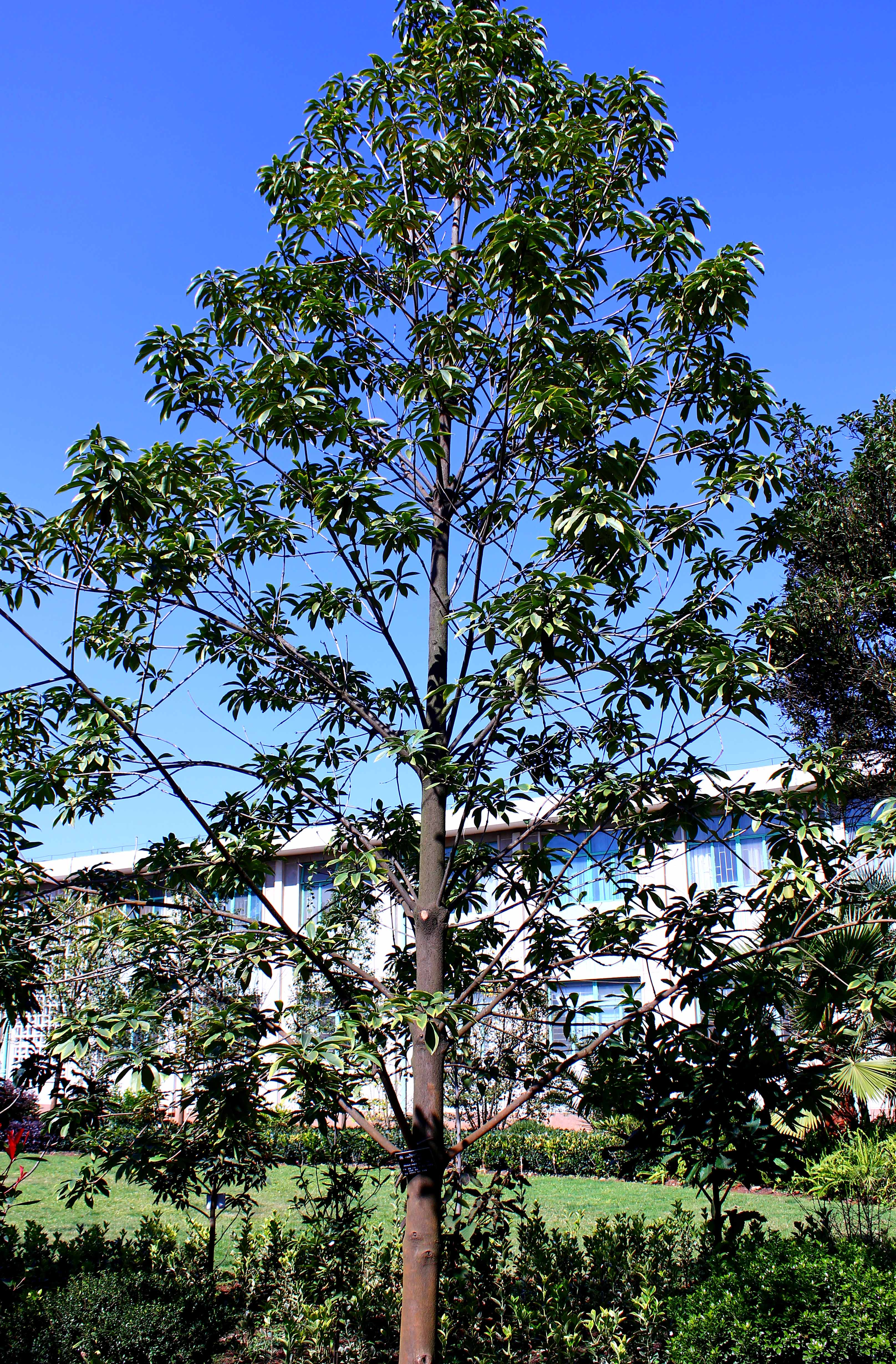

Conservation status
- Least Concern (IUCN 3.1)

Scientific classification
- Kingdom: Plantae
- Clade: Embryophytes
- Clade: Tracheophytes
- Clade: Spermatophytes
- Clade: Angiosperms
- Order: Austrobaileyales
- Family: Schisandraceae
- Genus: Illicium
- Species: I. majus

Binomial name
- Illicium majus Hook.f. & Thomson

Synonyms
- Badianifera major (Hook.f. & Thomson) Kuntze; Glochidion cavaleriei H.Lév.; Illicium cavaleriei (H.Lév.) H.Lév.; Illicium spathulatum Y.C.Wu

= Illicium majus =

Species of flowering plant

Illicium majus is a species of flowering plant in the family Schisandraceae. It is a tree with subleathery leaves and poisonous fruits. The species is native to China, Myanmar, and Vietnam.

Illicium majus was described in 1872, and is listed as of Least Concern by the IUCN.

== Taxonomy ==
Illicium majus was described by Joseph Dalton Hooker and Thomas Thomson in 1872.

== Distribution ==
Illicium majus is native to the subtropical biome of Vietnam, southern Myanmar, and south-east and south-central China (Guangdong, Guangxi, Guizhou, Hunan, and Yunnan). It has an estimated extent of occurrence of 1,325,389.57 square kilometres (511,735.77 sq mi).

The species grows in mixed forests, thickets, on rocky slopes, and along riverbanks, at elevations of 300–2,500 metres (980–8,200 ft).

== Description ==
Illicium majus is a tree up to 20 metres (66 ft) tall. The bark is poisonous. The leaves are in clusters of three to six, subleathery, oblong-lanceolate to oblanceolate, 10–20 centimetres (3.9–7.9 in) long, and 2.5–7 centimetres (0.98–2.76 in) wide. The leaf stems are 1–2.5 centimetres (0.39–0.98 in) long.

The flower stems are 1.8–4.5 centimetres (0.71–1.77 in) long. The flowers have fifteen to twenty-one fleshy tepals. The inner tepals are elliptic to obovate-oblong, 6–15 millimetres (0.24–0.59 in) long, and 3–9 millimetres (0.12–0.35 in) wide. The flowers have twelve to twenty-one stamens, and eleven to fourteen carpels. The plant flowers from April to June.

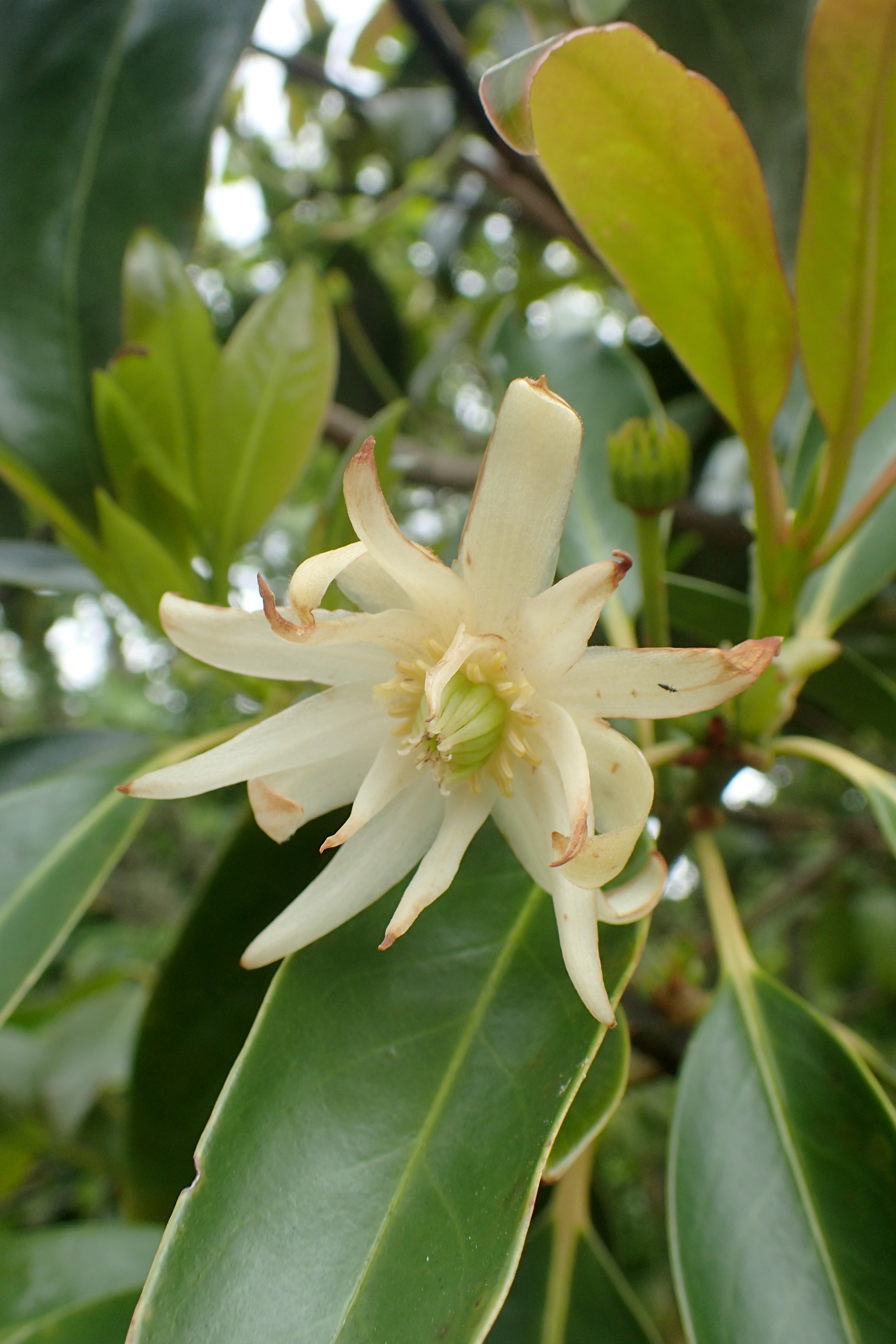
Illicium majus flower

The fruits have 1.8–4.5 centimetres (0.71–1.77 in) stems. The plant fruits from July to October. The fruit is poisonous.

== Conservation ==
In 2018, the IUCN assessed Illicium majus as of Least Concern. The species has a large population, wide distribution, and faces no significant threats.

== Nomenclature ==
In Chinese, the species is known as 大八角 (da ba jiao).
