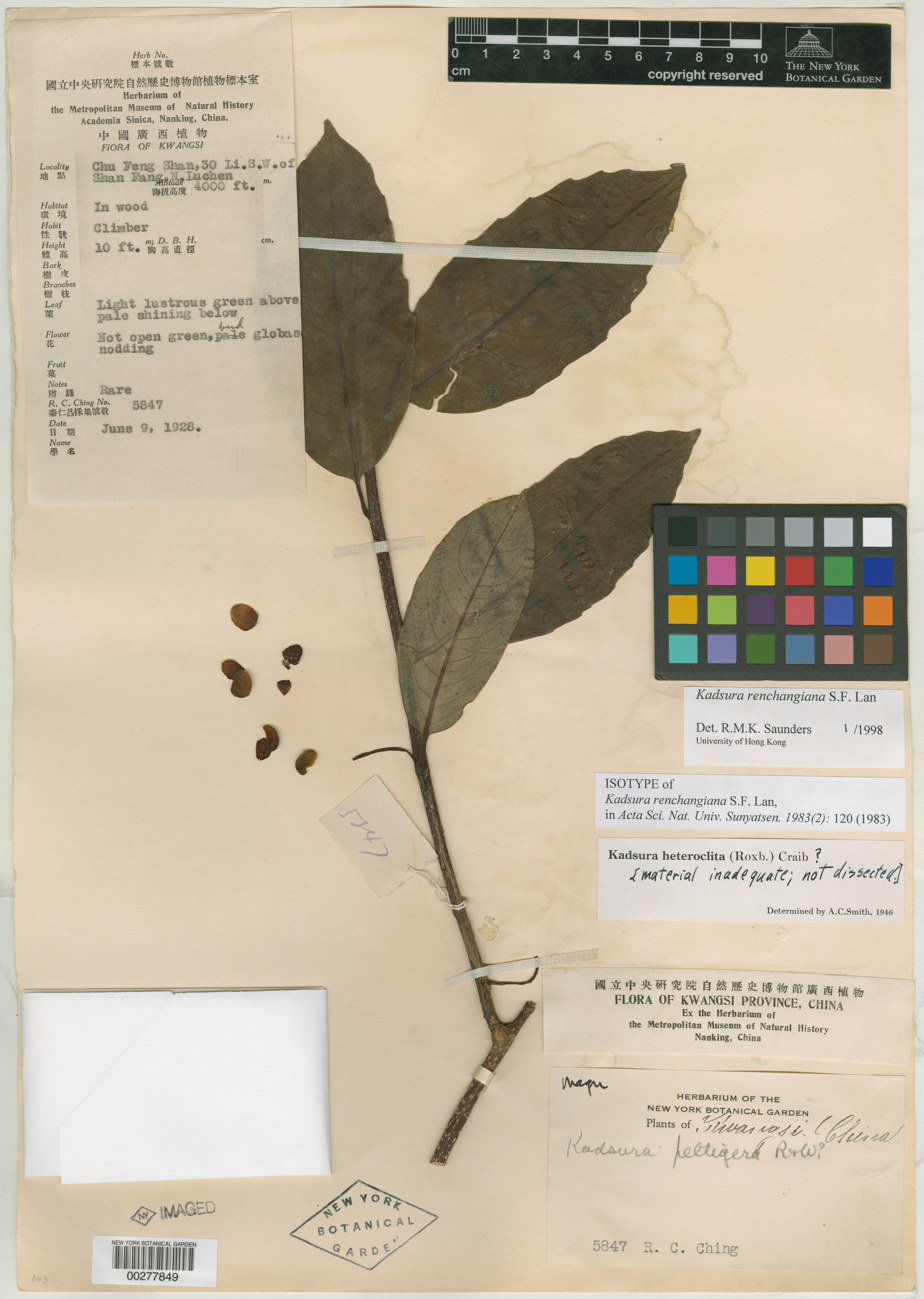

Scientific classification
- Kingdom: Plantae
- Clade: Tracheophytes
- Clade: Angiosperms
- Order: Austrobaileyales
- Family: Schisandraceae
- Genus: Kadsura
- Species: K. renchangiana

Binomial name
- Kadsura renchangiana S.F.Lan

= Kadsura renchangiana =

Species of flowering plant

Kadsura renchangiana is a woody vine endemic to the Chinese provinces of Guangxi and Guizhou. It is similar to K. angustifolia but can be distinguished by its thin, oblong leaf blades with strongly arcuate secondary veins.
