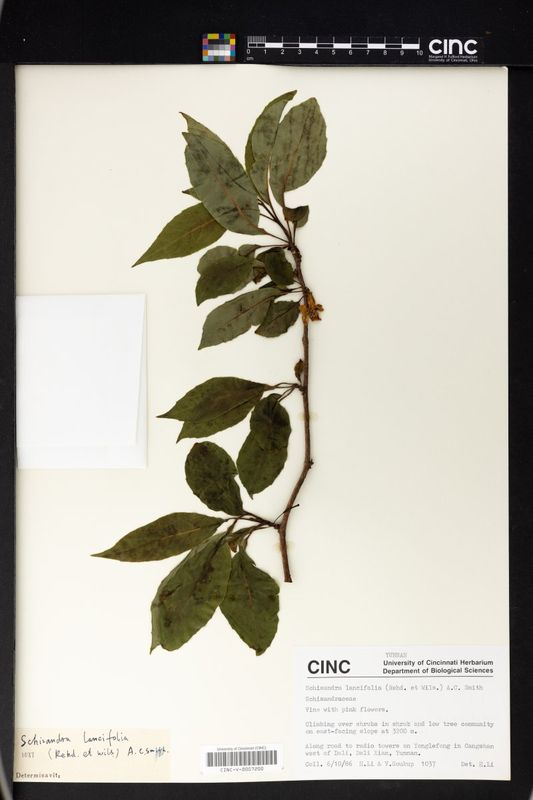

Scientific classification
- Kingdom: Plantae
- Clade: Embryophytes
- Clade: Tracheophytes
- Clade: Spermatophytes
- Clade: Angiosperms
- Order: Austrobaileyales
- Family: Schisandraceae
- Genus: Schisandra
- Species: S. lancifolia

Binomial name
- Schisandra lancifolia (Rehder & E.H.Wilson) A.C.Sm.

Synonyms
- Schisandra sphenanthera var. lancifolia Rehder & E.H.Wilson

= Schisandra lancifolia =

Species of flowering plant

Schisandra lancifolia is a species of flowering plant in the family Schisandraceae. It is a climbing plant with papery leaves, white to red or pink flowers, and edible fruits. The species is native to China, and was described in 1913.

== Taxonomy ==
Alfred Rehder and Ernest Henry Wilson described the species in 1913, placing it as a variety of Schisandra sphenanthera. In 1947, Albert Charles Smith described it as a species.

== Distribution ==
It is native to the temperate biome of Sichuan and Yunnan, China. It grows in forests and thickets, often near rivers. The species grows at elevations of 1,300–2,900 metres (4,300–9,500 ft).

== Description ==
It is a climbing plant. The plants are smooth. The leaf bearing branches are elongated. The leaf stems are 3–15 millimetres (0.12–0.59 in) long.

The leaves are papery, elliptical to ovate, 3.5–7.5 centimetres (1.4–3.0 in) long, and 1.5–4 centimetres (0.59–1.57 in).

The flowers are solitary. The female flowers have fourteen to twenty-four carpels, and grow on 2.4–5.6 centimetres (0.94–2.20 in) stems. The male flowers have eight to nineteen stamens, and grow on 0.9–3.6 centimetres (0.35–1.42 in) stems. The flowers have six to eight tepals, which can be white, yellow, orange, red, or pink. The largest tepals are 3.5–6 millimetres (0.14–0.24 in) long, and 3–5 millimetres (0.12–0.20 in) wide. The plant flowers from April to July.

The fruits grow on 3–5.5 centimetres (1.2–2.2 in) stems. The seeds are smooth or finely wrinkled. The plant fruits in October and November.

== Uses ==
Schisandra lancifolia is used in medicine, and produces edible fruit.

== Names ==
In Chinese, the species is known as 狹葉五味子 (xia ye wu wei zi).
