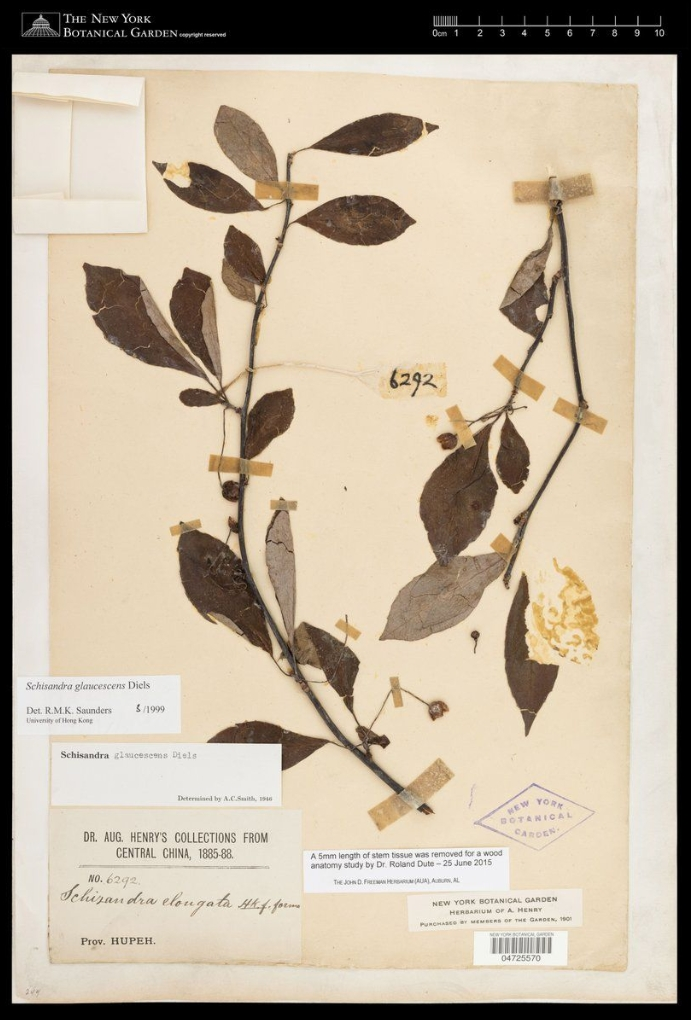

Scientific classification
- Kingdom: Plantae
- Clade: Embryophytes
- Clade: Tracheophytes
- Clade: Spermatophytes
- Clade: Angiosperms
- Order: Austrobaileyales
- Family: Schisandraceae
- Genus: Schisandra
- Species: S. glaucescens

Binomial name
- Schisandra glaucescens Diels

= Schisandra glaucescens =

Species of flowering plant

Schisandra glaucescens is a species of flowering plant in the family Schisandraceae. It is a climbing plant with papery leaves, white to yellow flowers, and edible fruits.

The species is native to China, and was described in 1900. It is used in horticulture and medicine.

== Taxonomy ==
The species was described by Ludwig Diels in 1900.

== Distribution ==
The species is native to the temperate biome of China (east Sichuan and west Hubei). It grows in forests and thickets, at elevations of 1,500–2,600 metres (4,900–8,500 ft).

== Description ==
Schisandra glaucescens is a climbing plant. The plants are entirely smooth.

The leaf-bearing branches are long. The leaves are papery or subleathery, elliptical to obovate in shape, 6–9 centimetres (2.4–3.5 in) long, and 2.5–5 centimetres (0.98–1.97 in) wide. The leaves have 0.9–2.6 centimetres (0.35–1.02 in) stems.

The flowers are solitary, and have six to eight tepals. The tepals are white to yellow. Male flowers have eighteen to twenty-four stamens, and 2.4–3.3 centimetres (0.94–1.30 in) stems. Female flowers have forty-two to fifty carpels, and 3.7–4 centimetres (1.5–1.6 in) stems. Schisandra glaucescens flowers in May and June.

The plant fruits from July to October. The seed coat is more or less smooth.

== Uses ==
Schisandra glaucescens is used in horticulture and medicine. Its fruits are edible.

== Nomenclature ==
In Chinese, Schisandra glaucescens is known as 金山五味子 (jin shan wu wei zi).
