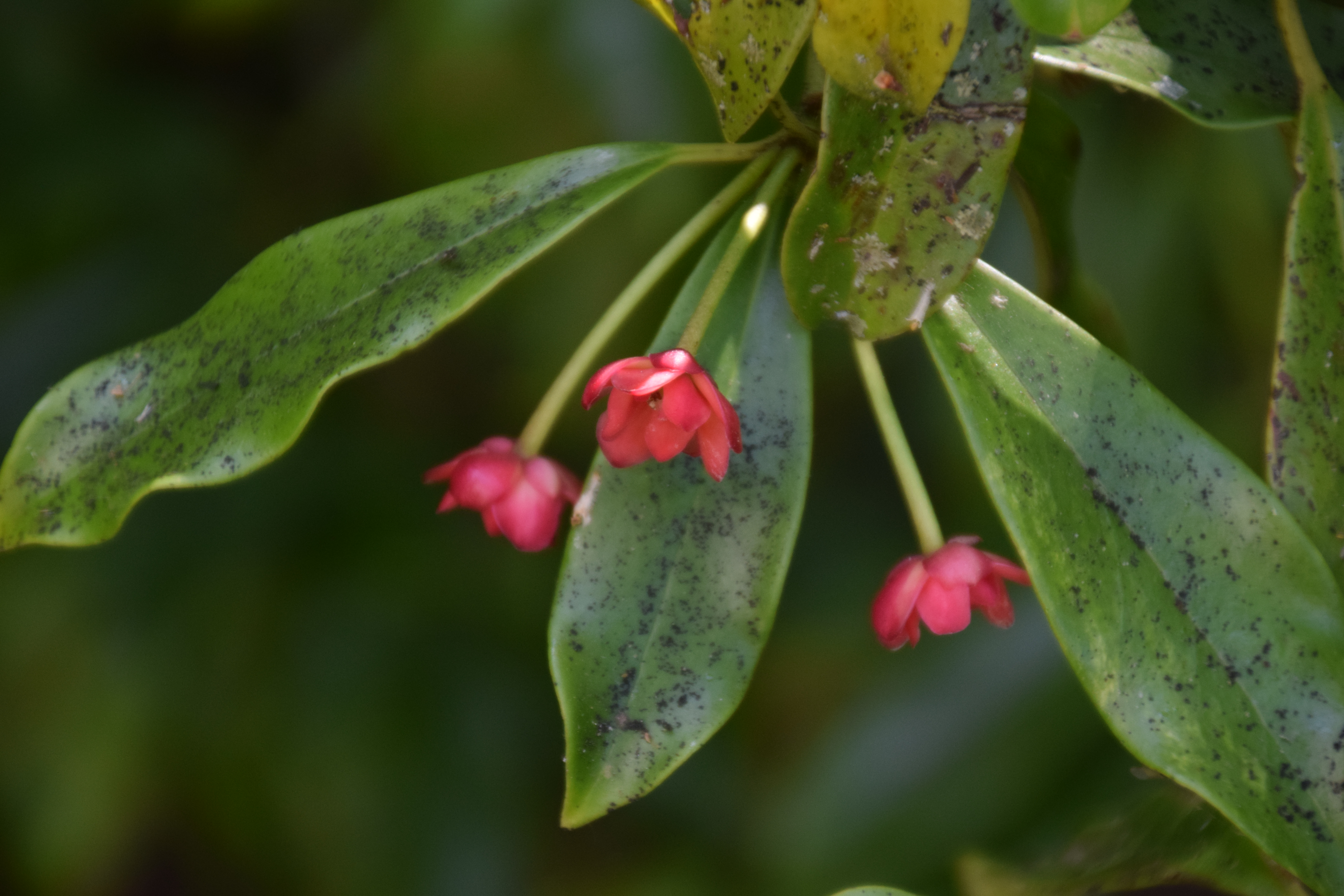

Conservation status
- Least Concern (IUCN 3.1)

Scientific classification
- Kingdom: Plantae
- Clade: Embryophytes
- Clade: Tracheophytes
- Clade: Spermatophytes
- Clade: Angiosperms
- Order: Austrobaileyales
- Family: Schisandraceae
- Genus: Illicium
- Species: I. lanceolatum

Binomial name
- Illicium lanceolatum A.C.Sm.

= Illicium lanceolatum =

Species of flowering plant

Illicium lanceolatum, commonly known as Guandong star anise, is a species of flowering plant in the family Schisandraceae. It is a shrub or tree with leathery leaves and red flowers. The species was described in 1947, and is native to China.

Illicium lanceolatum is used to produce essential oils, and in medicine. It is listed as of Least Concern by the IUCN.

== Taxonomy ==
Illicium lanceolatum was first described by Albert Charles Smith in 1947.

== Distribution ==
Illicium lanceolatum is native to the temperate biome of south-central and south-east China. It is present in the provinces of Anhui, Fujian, Guizhou, Hubei, Hunan, Jiangsu, Jiangxi, and Zhejiang. The species grows in mixed forests and thickets, at elevations of 300–1,500 metres (980–4,920 ft). The species' estimated extent of occurrence is 1,006,730.39 square kilometres (388,700.78 sq mi).

== Description ==
Illicium lanceolatum is a shrub or tree up to 10 metres (33 ft) high. The leaves are arranged in clusters. The leaf stems are 0.7–1.5 centimetres (0.28–0.59 in) long. The leaves are leathery in texture, lanceolate, oblanceolate, or obovate-elliptical in shape, 5–15 centimetres (2.0–5.9 in) long, and 1.5–4.5 centimetres (0.59–1.77 in) wide.

The flower stems are 1.5–5 centimetres (0.59–1.97 in) long. The flowers have ten to fifteen red to dark red tepals. The largest tepals are elliptical to oblong-obovate, fleshy, 8–13 millimetres (0.31–0.51 in) long, and 6–8 millimetres (0.24–0.31 in). The flowers have six to eleven stamens, and ten to fourteen carpels. The plant flowers from April to June.

The fruit stems are 6–8 centimetres (2.4–3.1 in) long. The plant fruits from August to October.

== Uses ==
The fruits and leaves are used to make essential oils. The roots and root bark are used in medicine, although they are toxic.

== Conservation ==
In 2018, the IUCN assessed Illicium lanceolatum as of Least Concern. The population is large, and considered stable. The species faces no major threats.

== Names ==
In Chinese, the species is known as 紅毒茴 (hong du hui).
