= Illicium dunnianum =

Scientific classification
- Kingdom: Plantae
- Clade: Tracheophytes
- Clade: Angiosperms
- Order: Austrobaileyales
- Family: Schisandraceae
- Genus: Illicium
- Species: I. dunnianum

Binomial name
- Illicium dunnianum Tutcher

Synonyms
- Illicium dunnianum var. latifolium Q.Lin

Species of flowering plant

Illicium dunnianum is a species of flowering plant in the family Schisandraceae. It is a shrub with leathery leaves and pink to red tepals. The species is native to south and south-east China.

Illicium dunnianum was described in 1905, and is named after Stephen Troyte Dunn.

== Taxonomy ==
The species was described by William James Tutcher in 1905.

== Distribution ==
Illicium dunnianum is native to the subtropical biome of south-east and south-central China (southern Fujian, Guangdong, Guangxi, southern and south-western Guizhou, and western Hunan). It grows along riverbanks and ravines, and on wet slopes, at elevations of 400–1,000 metres (1,300–3,300 ft).

== Description ==
Illicium dunnianum is a shrub that grows 2–10 metres (6.6–32.8 ft) high. The leaves are narrowly lanceolate or oblanceolate, thinly leathery, 5–12 centimetres (2.0–4.7 in) long, and 0.8–1.2 centimetres (0.31–0.47 in) wide. The leaves are in clusters of three to eight, and grow on 3–12 millimetres (0.12–0.47 in) stems.

The flower stems are 1–3.5 centimetres (0.39–1.38 in) long. The flowers have twelve to twenty tepals, which are pink, red, or purplish red, and papery to slightly fleshy. The largest tepals are 6–11 millimetres (0.24–0.43 in) long, 4–8 millimetres (0.16–0.31 in) wide, and elliptic to suborbicular. The flowers have nineteen to twenty-four stamens, and eight to thirteen carpels. The plant flowers from March to July and October to November.

The fruits grow on 2–5.5 centimetres (0.79–2.17 in) long stems. The seeds are 4–5 millimetres (0.16–0.20 in) long, and 2.5–3.3 millimetres (0.098–0.130 in) wide. The plant fruits from July to October.

== Nomenclature ==
Illicium dunnianum is named after Stephen Troyte Dunn.

In Chinese, the species is known as 鄧氏八角 (deng shi ba jiao) or 紅花八角 (hong hua ba jiao).
