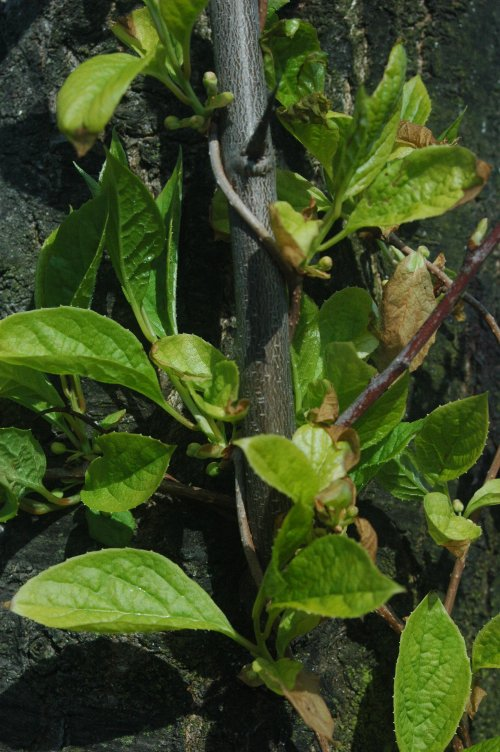
- Schisandra chinensis

Scientific classification
- Kingdom: Plantae
- Clade: Embryophytes
- Clade: Tracheophytes
- Clade: Spermatophytes
- Clade: Angiosperms
- Order: Austrobaileyales
- Family: Schisandraceae
- Genus: Schisandra; Michx.

Synonyms
- Schizandra, common misspelling; Stellandria Brickell; Sphaerostema Blume; Maximowiczia Rupr.

= Schisandra =

Magnolia vine

Family of shrubs

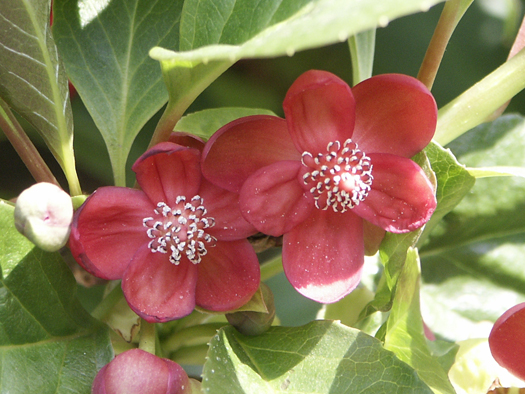
Flowers of Schisandra rubriflora at Royal Botanic Gardens, Kew, UK

Schisandra, the magnolia vines, is a genus of twining shrubs that generally climb on other vegetation. Various authors have included the plants in the Illiciaceae.

Schisandra (also spelled Schizandra) is native to Asia and North America, with a center of diversity in China.

Some species are commonly grown in gardens as ornamentals. It is a hardy deciduous climber which thrives in almost any kind of soil; its preferred position is on a sheltered, shady wall. It may be propagated by cuttings of half-matured shoots in August.

Despite its common name "magnolia vine", Schisandra is not closely related to the true magnolias.

== Uses ==
Its dried fruit is sometimes used medicinally. In China, the berries of S. chinensis are given the name wǔwèizǐ (五味子; 'five flavor fruit') because they possess all five basic flavors in Chinese herbal medicine: salty, sweet, sour, pungent (spicy), and bitter. In traditional Chinese medicine it is used as a remedy for many ailments: to resist infections, improve skin health, combat insomnia, and to reduce coughing and thirst.

== Taxonomy ==
In 2007, Schisandra was divided into the subgenera Schisandra and Sphaerostema. The subgenus Schisandra is divided into four sections: Maximowiczia, Pleiostema, Schisandra, and Sinoschisandra.

=== Species ===
Accepted species:

- Schisandra arisanensis - S China incl Taiwan
- Schisandra bicolor - Guangxi, Hunan, Yunnan, Zhejiang
- Schisandra cauliflora - Vietnam
- Schisandra chinensis - Russian Far East, NE China, Korea, Japan
- Schisandra elongata - Java
- Schisandra glabra - Hidalgo, United States (LA AR MS AL TN KY GA FL SC NC)
- Schisandra glaucescens - Chongqing, Hubei
- Schisandra grandiflora - Tibet, Sikkim, Nepal, Bhutan, Assam, Uttarakhand
- Schisandra henryi - S China
- Schisandra incarnata - Hubei
- Schisandra lancifolia - Sichuan, Yunnan
- Schisandra longipes - Guangdong, Guangxi
- Schisandra macrocarpa - Yunnan
- Schisandra micrantha - Manipur, Yunnan, Myanmar
- Schisandra neglecta - Sikkim, Nepal, Bhutan, Assam, Myanmar, Yunnan
- Schisandra parapropinqua - Guizhou, Yunnan
- Schisandra perulata - Thailand, Vietnam
- Schisandra plena - Arunachal Pradesh, Yunnan
- Schisandra propinqua - China, Assam, Nepal, Myanmar, Thailand, Java, Bali
- Schisandra pubescens - Sichuan, Hubei
- Schisandra pubinervis - Hubei, Sichuan
- Schisandra repanda - Korea, Japan
- Schisandra rubriflora - Arunachal Pradesh, Yunnan, Myanmar, Sichuan
- Schisandra sphaerandra - Sichuan, Yunnan
- Schisandra sphenanthera - China
- Schisandra tomentella - Sichuan

== Chemistry ==
The extract of S. rubriflora, a native of the Yunnan province, was found to contain complex and highly oxygenated nortriterpenoids called rubriflorins A-C.

== See also ==
- Kadsura japonica
