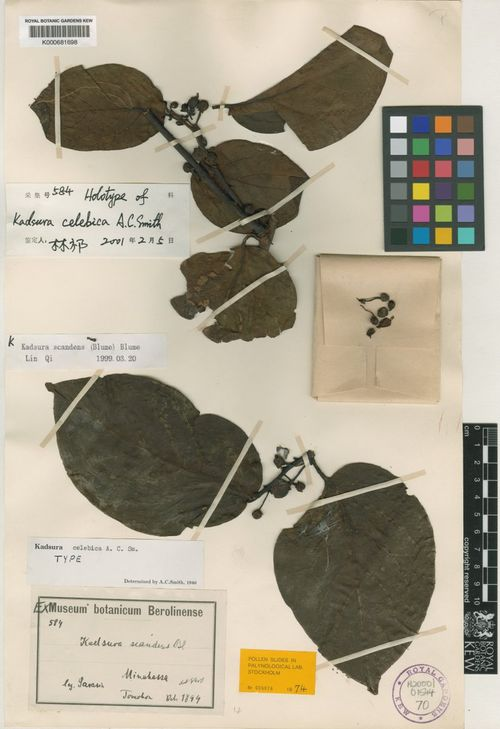

Scientific classification
- Kingdom: Plantae
- Clade: Tracheophytes
- Clade: Angiosperms
- Order: Austrobaileyales
- Family: Schisandraceae
- Genus: Kadsura
- Species: K. celebica

Binomial name
- Kadsura celebica A.C.Sm.

= Kadsura celebica =

Species of flowering plant

Kadsura celebica is a woody liana (climbing vine) in the family Schisandraceae native to northern Sulawesi.

== Description ==
Kadsura celebica thrives in wet biomes. It has subcoriaceous, ovate leaves that have an average size of 13 by 9 cm (5.1 by 3.5 in), with flowers borne solitary (singular) in the axils of leaves, and on occasion a secondary flower will be borne in the axils of prophyll, also possibly seen in the axils of fugaceous bracts. all of which flowers have a peduncle of around 15 mm (0.6 in) long.

== Taxonomy ==
Kadsura celebica was first described in 1947 by the American botanist Albert Charles Smith. The species epithet celebica refers to the island of Sulawesi, which was formerly known as Celebes.
