= Schisandra plena =

Scientific classification
- Kingdom: Plantae
- Clade: Embryophytes
- Clade: Tracheophytes
- Clade: Spermatophytes
- Clade: Angiosperms
- Order: Austrobaileyales
- Family: Schisandraceae
- Genus: Schisandra
- Species: S. plena

Binomial name
- Schisandra plena A.C.Sm.

Species of flowering plant

Schisandra plena is a species of flowering plant in the family Schisandraceae. It is a climbing plant with papery to subleathery leaves, and white to pale yellow flowers.

The species is native to India, China, and Myanmar. It was described in 1947.

== Taxonomy ==
Schisandra plena was described by Albert Charles Smith in 1947.

Within Schisandra, Schisandra plena is placed in the subgenus Schisandra, and the section Sphaerostema. It forms a clade with Schisandra propinqua.

== Distribution ==
Schisandra plena is native to the subtropical biome of India (Arunachal Pradesh), China (Yunnan) and northern Myanmar. It grows in dense forests, at elevations of 600–1,500 metres (2,000–4,900 ft).

== Description ==
Schisandra plena is a climbing plant with woody vines. The leaf bearing branches are elongated.

The leaves are papery to subleathery, ovate to ovate-elliptical, 8–14 centimetres (3.1–5.5 in) long, and 3.5–5 centimetres (1.4–2.0 in) wide. The leaf stems are 1.3–1.9 centimetres (0.51–0.75 in) long.

The flowers are solitary, or in clusters. The male inflorescences have 0.7–1.5 centimetres (0.28–0.59 in) stems, and eight stamens. The male flowers have twelve to seventeen tepals, which are white to pale yellow, and red at the base. The largest tepals are 8.5–10 millimetres (0.33–0.39 in) long, and 4–4.5 millimetres (0.16–0.18 in) wide. The female flowers have around thirteen tepals, and around thirty-one carpels. The plant flowers in April and May.

The fruit stems are 1–1.5 centimetres (0.39–0.59 in) long. The plant fruits in August and September.

The seeds are flattened and elliptical, 5.5–6 millimetres (0.22–0.24 in) long, and 7–7.5 millimetres (0.28–0.30 in) wide. The seed case is more or less smooth.

== Nomenclature ==
In Chinese, Schisandra plena is known as 重瓣五味子 (chong ban wu wei zi).
