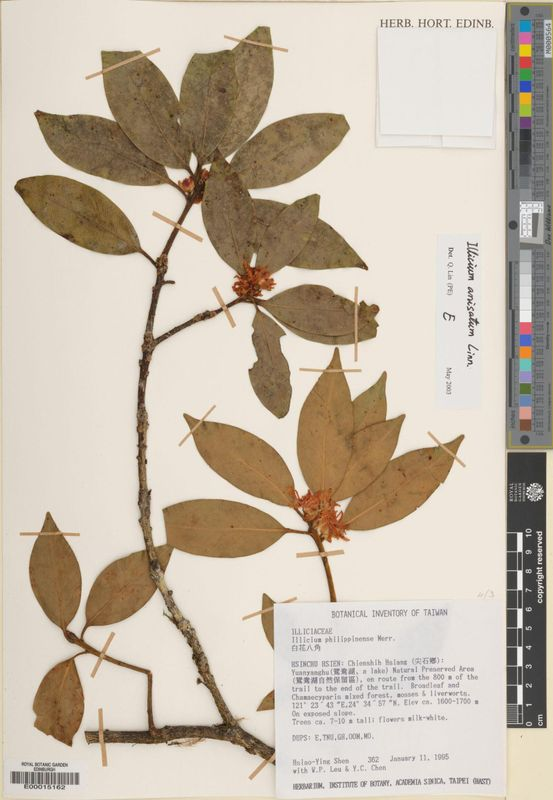

Conservation status
- Near Threatened (IUCN 3.1)

Scientific classification
- Kingdom: Plantae
- Clade: Embryophytes
- Clade: Tracheophytes
- Clade: Spermatophytes
- Clade: Angiosperms
- Order: Austrobaileyales
- Family: Schisandraceae
- Genus: Illicium
- Species: I. philippinense

Binomial name
- Illicium philippinense Merr.

Synonyms
- Illicium daibuense Yamam.; Illicium leucanthum Hayata; Illicium montanum Merr.; Illicium philippinense var. daibuense (Yamam.) S.S.Ying

= Illicium philippinense =

Species of flowering plant

Illicium philippinense is a species of flowering plant in the family Schisandraceae. It is a shrub or tree with leathery leaves, and white flowers. The species is native to Taiwan and the Philippines.

Illicium philippinense was described in 1909, and is listed as Near Threatened by the IUCN.

== Taxonomy ==
The species was described by Elmer Drew Merrill in 1909.

== Distribution ==
Illicium philippinense is native to the wet tropical biome of the Philippines (Mountain Province, Oriental Mindoro, and Zambales) and Taiwan. Its estimated extent of occurrence is 127,266.226 square kilometres (49,137.765 sq mi).

It grows in submontane forests, at elevations of 1,000–2,400 metres (3,300–7,900 ft).

== Description ==
Illicium philippinense is a shrub or tree that grows 4–8 metres (13–26 ft) high. The branches are stout, dark in colour, and wrinkled when dry.

The leaves are in clusters of three or four, and have 0.7–1.5 centimetres (0.28–0.59 in) stems. The leaves are leathery, lanceolate to narrowly oblong-elliptic, 5–10 centimetres (2.0–3.9 in) long, and 2–4 centimetres (0.79–1.57 in) wide.

The flower stem is 5–14 millimetres (0.20–0.55 in) long. The flowers are solitary, fragrant, and around 1 centimetre (0.39 in) long. The flowers have fifteen to twenty-one white tepals. The male flowers have sixteen to twenty-three stamens, and the female flowers have six to eight carpels. The plant flowers from December to March.

The fruit stem is up to 2.5 centimetres (0.98 in) long. The fruits are around 2 centimetres (0.79 in) wide when mature. The plant fruits from May to November. The seeds are pale and shiny.

== Conservation ==
In 2022, the IUCN assessed Illicium philippinense as Near Threatened. The species is threatened by habitat loss, which is caused by logging, changes in agriculture, urbanisation, and mining.

The species is not legally protected, but occurs in protected areas, including Alishan Taiwan Pleione Nature Reserve, the Zambales Mountains, and Mount Halcon.

== Nomenclature ==
In Chinese, the species is known as 白花八角 (bai hua ba jiao).
