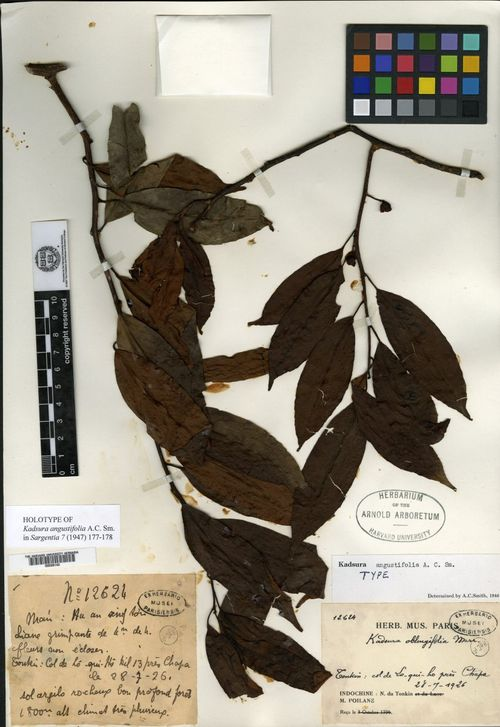

Scientific classification
- Kingdom: Plantae
- Clade: Tracheophytes
- Clade: Angiosperms
- Order: Austrobaileyales
- Family: Schisandraceae
- Genus: Kadsura
- Species: K. angustifolia

Binomial name
- Kadsura angustifolia A.C.Sm

Synonyms
- Kadsura guangxiensis S.F.Lan

= Kadsura angustifolia =

Species of flowering plant

Kadsura angustifolia is a species of flowering plant in the Schisandraceae family.

== Description ==
Specimens of K. angustifolia are entirely smooth. The leaf stalks are 1-2 cm long. The leaves are narrow, elliptical, and measure 9-14 cm, and 2-5cm wide. They are papery in texture. The flower stalks are around 1cm in length, and the stalks on female flowers are longer than those on the male flower. The stalks on the fruits are around 4cm in length. The seeds are disc-shaped.

The carpels and foliage of K. angustifolia differ from those of the other species of its genus, such as Kadsura heteroclita.

== Distribution ==
The species is found in the wet tropical forests of Guangxi and northern Vietnam, at elevations from 900 to 1800m.

== Uses ==
K. angustifolia is used in medicine.
