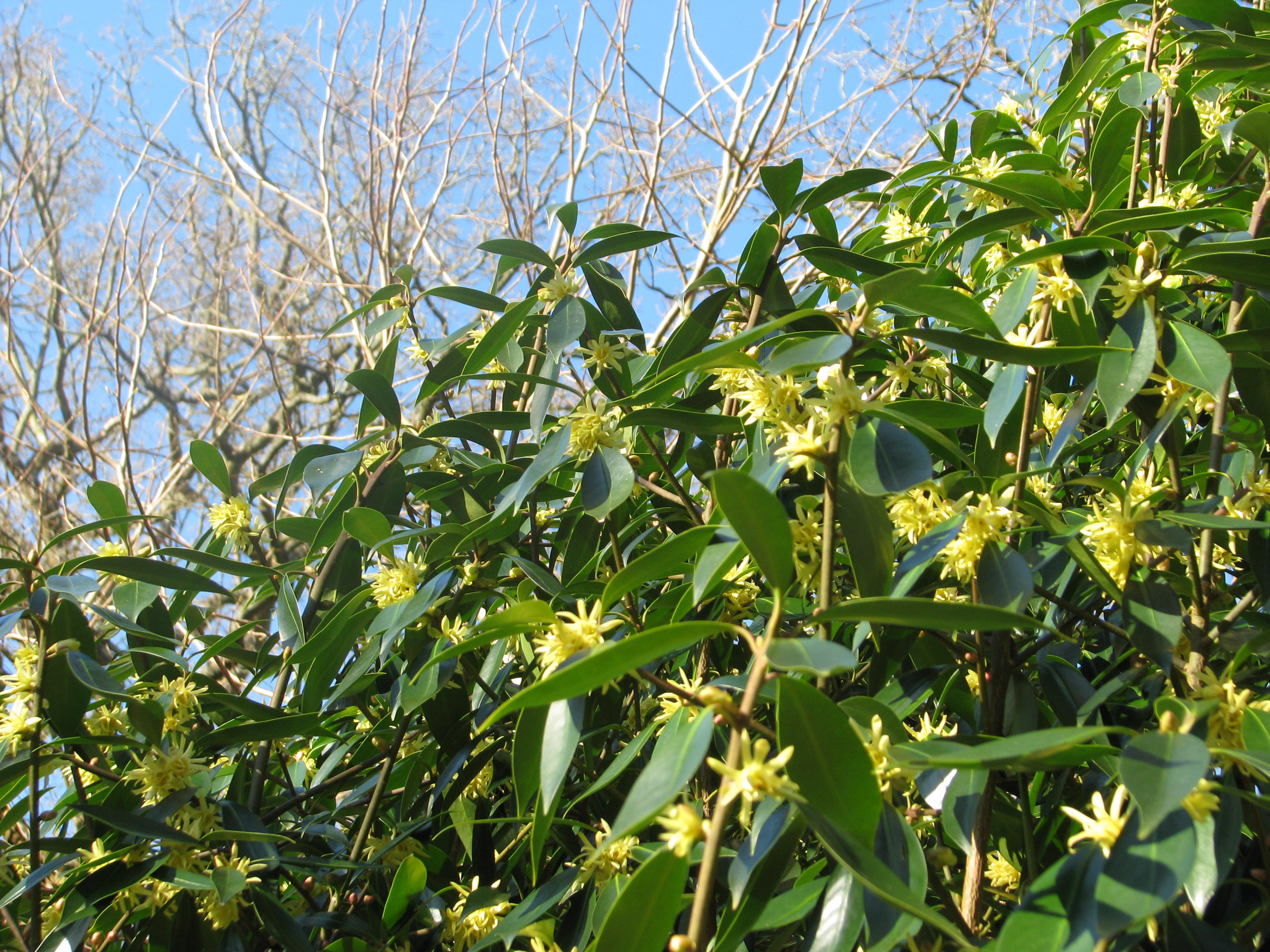

Conservation status
- Least Concern (IUCN 3.1)

Scientific classification
- Kingdom: Plantae
- Clade: Embryophytes
- Clade: Tracheophytes
- Clade: Angiosperms
- Order: Austrobaileyales
- Family: Schisandraceae
- Genus: Illicium
- Species: I. simonsii

Binomial name
- Illicium simonsii Maxim.

Synonyms
- Synonymy: Illicium fargesii Finet & Gagnep.; Illicium fargesii subsp. szechuanense (W.C.Cheng) Q.Lin; Illicium fargesii var. szechuanense (W.C.Cheng) Q.Lin; Illicium griffithii var. yunnanense Franch.; Illicium jiadifengpi var. szechuanense (W.C.Cheng) Y.W.Law & B.N.Chang; Illicium manipurense Watt ex King; Illicium szechuanense W.C.Cheng; Illicium yunnanense (Franch.) Franch. ex Finet & Gagnep.

= Illicium simonsii =

Species of flowering plant

Illicium simonsii, commonly known as Simon's anise tree, is a species of flowering plant in the family Schisandraceae. It is a shrub or tree with leathery leaves, and pale yellow to white tepals. The leaves, flowers and fruit are toxic. The species is native to India, China, and Myanmar.

Illicium simonsii was described in 1888, and is listed as of Least Concern by the IUCN.

== Taxonomy ==
The species was described by Karl Maximovich in 1888.

== Distribution ==
Illicium simonsii is native to the temperate biome of India (Assam), China (Yunnan, western Guizhou, and south-west Sichuan), and Myanmar. Its estimated extent of occurrence is 344,940.92 square kilometres (133,182.43 sq mi).

Illicium simonsii grows on well-drained acidic loam or sand, in thickets, forests, open fields, ravines, and wet places along rivers. It is present at elevations of 1,700–3,200 metres (5,600–10,500 ft). The species grows in full sun or partial shade.

== Description ==
Illicium simonsii is a relatively hardy evergreen shrub or tree. It usually grows up to 9 metres (30 ft) high.

The leaves are in clusters of three to five. The leaves are leathery, lanceolate to elliptical, 5–10 centimetres (2.0–3.9 in) long, and 1.5–3.5 centimetres (0.59–1.38 in) wide. The leaf stem is 0.7–2 centimetres (0.28–0.79 in) long.

The flower stems are 2–8 millimetres (0.079–0.315 in) long. The flowers have eighteen to twenty-three tepals, which are pale yellow, creamy, white, or rarely pink. The outer tepals are elliptical-oblong, and thinly papery. The flowers have sixteen to eighteen stamens, and eight to thirteen carpels. The plant flowers during most of the year, but mostly from February to May.

The fruits grow on 0.5–1.6 centimetres (0.20–0.63 in) stems. The seeds are 6–7 millimetres (0.24–0.28 in) long. The plant fruits from June to October.

The leaves, flowers, and fruit are all highly toxic.

== Conservation ==
In 2018, the IUCN assessed Illicium simonsii as of Least Concern. The population is large, and faces no major threats.

== Nomenclature ==
In English, Illicium simonsii is commonly known as Simon's anise tree.

In Chinese, the species is known as 西蒙氏八角 (xi meng shi ba jiao) or 野八角 (ye ba jiao).
