= Schisandra henryi =

- Schisandra henryi subsp. marginalis

Scientific classification
- Kingdom: Plantae
- Clade: Embryophytes
- Clade: Tracheophytes
- Clade: Spermatophytes
- Clade: Angiosperms
- Order: Austrobaileyales
- Family: Schisandraceae
- Genus: Schisandra
- Species: S. henryi

Binomial name
- Schisandra henryi C.B.Clarke

Subspecies
- Schisandra henryi subsp. henryi; Schisandra henryi subsp. hoatii; Schisandra henryi subsp. marginalis; Schisandra henryi subsp. yunnanensis

Species of flowering plant

Schisandra henryi is a species of flowering plant in the family Schisandraceae. It is a climbing plant with papery to subleathery leaves, red to yellow flowers, and edible fruit.

The species is native to China and Vietnam. It was described in 1905, and has four subspecies. It is used in medicine and horticulture.

== Taxonomy ==
Schisandra henryi was described by Charles Baron Clarke in 1905.

Schisandra henryi has four subspecies:

- Schisandra henryi subsp. henryi (native to South China)
- Schisandra henryi subsp. hoatii N.S.Lý & X.T.Nguyễn (native to Vietnam)
- Schisandra henryi subsp. marginalis (A.C.Sm.) R.M.K.Saunders (native to South East China)
- Schisandra henryi subsp. yunnanensis (A.C.Sm.) R.M.K.Saunders (native to Yunnan, south China).

Schisandra henryi subsp. yunnanensis

== Distribution ==
The species is native to the temperate biome of south-central and south-east China, and to Vietnam. It grows in forests, shrublands, and thickets, at elevations of 500–2,100 metres (1,600–6,900 ft).

== Description ==
Schisandra henryi is a climbing plant. The plants are entirely smooth.

The leaves range in texture from papery to subleathery. They are elliptic to ovate in shape, 7.5–11.5 centimetres (3.0–4.5 in) long, and 3–9 centimetres (1.2–3.5 in) wide. The leaf-bearing branches are long. The leaves have 1.2–4 centimetres (0.47–1.57 in) stalks.

The flowers have six to ten tepals, which range in colour from yellow to red. The male flowers have twelve to forty-six stamens, and 1.7–6.2 centimetres (0.67–2.44 in) long stems. The female flowers have twenty-eight to sixty-five carpels, and 3.2–4.7 centimetres (1.3–1.9 in) long stems. The plant flowers from April to August, though the timing differs by subspecies.

Schisandra henryi subsp. henryi flowers from April to August. Schisandra henryi subsp. marginalis flowers from April to May. Schisandra henryi subsp. yunnanensis flowers from May to June.

The plant fruits from July to October, though the timing varies by subspecies. Schisandra henryi subsp. henryi fruits from August to October. Schisandra henryi subsp. marginalis and Schisandra henryi subsp. yunnanensis fruit from July to October.

The seeds are finely wrinkled, or covered in tubercules.

== Uses ==
Schisandra henryi is used in medicine and horticulture. It produces edible fruit.

== Nomenclature ==
In Chinese, the species is known as 翼梗五味子 (yi geng wu wei zi).
