= Schisandra tomentella =

Scientific classification
- Kingdom: Plantae
- Clade: Embryophytes
- Clade: Tracheophytes
- Clade: Spermatophytes
- Clade: Angiosperms
- Order: Austrobaileyales
- Family: Schisandraceae
- Genus: Schisandra
- Species: S. tomentella

Binomial name
- Schisandra tomentella A.C.Sm.

Species of flowering plant

Schisandra tomentella is a species of flowering plant in the family Schisandraceae. It is a climbing plant with papery leaves and yellow flowers.

The species is native to Sichuan, China, and was described in 1947.

== Distribution ==
Schisandra tomentella is native to the temperate biome of south Sichuan, China. It grows in forests and thickets, at elevations of 1,300–2,200 metres (4,300–7,200 ft).

== Taxonomy ==
Schisandra tomentella was described by Albert Charles Smith in 1947.

== Description ==
Schisandra tomentella is a climbing plant.

The leaves are papery, obovate to elliptical in shape, 6–10.5 centimetres (2.4–4.1 in) long, and 4–6 centimetres (1.6–2.4 in) wide. The leaf margins are finely toothed. The leaf stems are 1–2.7 centimetres (0.39–1.06 in) long. The leaf bearing branches are elongated.

The flowers have five to seven yellow tepals. The largest tepals are 5.5–10 millimetres (0.22–0.39 in) long, and 4.5–6.5 millimetres (0.18–0.26 in) wide. The male flowers have sixteen to twenty-two stamens, and grow on 2.4–4.3 centimetres (0.94–1.69 in) stems. The female flowers have forty-five to seventy carpels, and grow on 2–4.5 centimetres (0.79–1.77 in) stems. The plants flower in May.

The fruits grow on stems, which are around 5.5 centimetres (2.2 in) long. The plant fruits in August.
