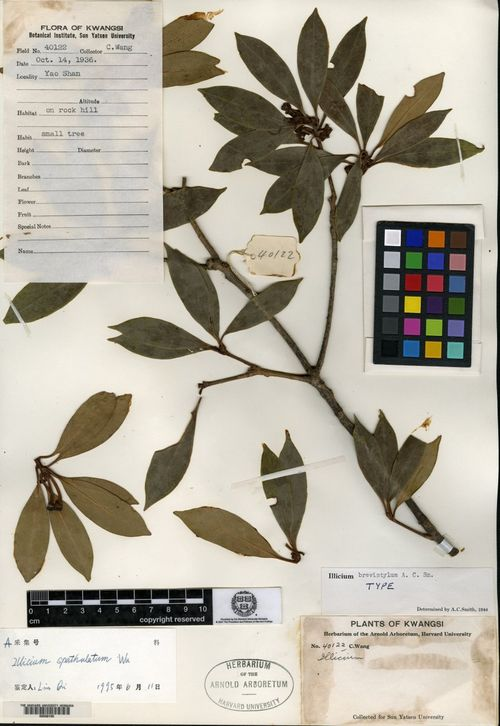

Scientific classification
- Kingdom: Plantae
- Clade: Embryophytes
- Clade: Tracheophytes
- Clade: Spermatophytes
- Clade: Angiosperms
- Order: Austrobaileyales
- Family: Schisandraceae
- Genus: Illicium
- Species: I. brevistylum

Binomial name
- Illicium brevistylum A.C.Sm.

= Illicium brevistylum =

Species of flowering plant

Illicium brevistylum is a species of flowering plant in the family Schisandraceae. It is a shrub or tree, with leathery leaves, and pale red tepals.

The species is native to southern China, and was described in 1947.

== Taxonomy ==
Illicium brevistylum was described by Albert Charles Smith in 1947.

== Distribution ==
Illicium brevistylum is native to the subtropical biome of south-east and south-central China. The species is present in Guangdong, Guangxi, southern Hunan, and Yunnan. It grows on rocks, in forests and thickets, at elevations of 700–1,700 metres (2,300–5,600 ft).

== Description ==
Illicium brevistylum is a tree or shrub, up to 15 metres (49 ft) tall.

The leaves form clusters of three to five, and are narrowly oblong-elliptical to oblanceolate in shape. The leaves are thin, leathery, 5–8 centimetres (2.0–3.1 in) long, and 1.5–4.5 centimetres (0.59–1.77 in) wide.

The flowers grow on 0.4–1.6 centimetres (0.16–0.63 in) stems. The flowers have nine to eleven tepals, which are pale red. The largest tepals are 6–11 millimetres (0.24–0.43 in) in length and width. The outer tepals are papery, and the inner tepals are fleshy. The plant has fourteen to twenty stamens, and twelve to thirteen carpels. The plant flowers in April, May, and October.

The fruits have eleven to thirteen follicles, and 1.6–3.5 centimetres (0.63–1.38 in) stems. The plant fruits from April to May, and October to November. The seeds are 6–7 millimetres (0.24–0.28 in) long.

== Nomenclature ==
In Chinese, the species is known as 短柱八角 (duan zhu ba jiao).
