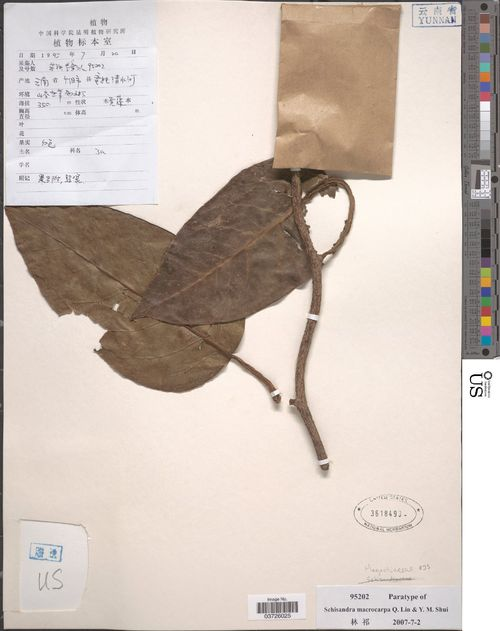

Scientific classification
- Kingdom: Plantae
- Clade: Tracheophytes
- Clade: Angiosperms
- Order: Austrobaileyales
- Family: Schisandraceae
- Genus: Schisandra
- Species: S. macrocarpa

Binomial name
- Schisandra macrocarpa Q.Lin & Y.M.Shui

= Schisandra macrocarpa =

Species of flowering plant

Schisandra macrocarpa is a species of flowering plant in the family Schisandraceae. It is native to Yunnan, China.

Schisandra macrocarpa is a woody vine with simple, suleathery leaves and flowers that typically grow in clusters of three to five. It flowers from April to May and fruits between August and October.

The species was described in 2011.

== Distribution ==
The species is endemic to the subtropical biome of south-east Yunnan, China. It is found at elevations of 300–1,300 metres (980–4,270 ft), in monsoon forests on limestone hills.

== Description ==
Schisandra macrocarpa is a climbing evergreen woody vine, which grows 5–20 metres (16–66 ft) long. The branches are dark purple. Newer branches are 3–6 millimetres (0.12–0.24 in) in diameter, and older stems are 3–4 centimetres (1.2–1.6 in) in diameter.

The leaves are simple, arranged alternately, and subleathery. The leaves are ovate-elliptic to elliptic in shape, 10–22 centimetres (3.9–8.7 in) long, and 7–12 centimetres (2.8–4.7 in) wide.

The flowers are usually arranged in clusters of three to five, or in groups of three to eight on racemes. Rarely, they may be solitary. The flowers have twelve to sixteen tepals, which are greenish to yellow in colour. The outermost tepals are 1.5–2 millimetres (0.059–0.079 in) long, and 1.3–1.5 millimetres (0.051–0.059 in) wide. The largest tepals are 6–8 millimetres (0.24–0.31 in) long, and 4–5 millimetres (0.16–0.20 in) wide.

The male flowers have three to eight stamens, which are fused into a nearly spherical mass. The female flowers have twenty to thirty carpels. The plant flowers from April to May.

The fruits are 2–3.5 millimetres (0.079–0.138 in) wide, and grow on 3–4 centimetres (1.2–1.6 in) stems. The plant fruits from August to October. The seeds are yellow-brown, 0.8–1 centimetre (0.31–0.39 in) long, and 1–1.2 centimetres (0.39–0.47 in) wide.

== Nomenclature ==
In Chinese, the species is known as 大果五味子 (da guo wu wei zi).
