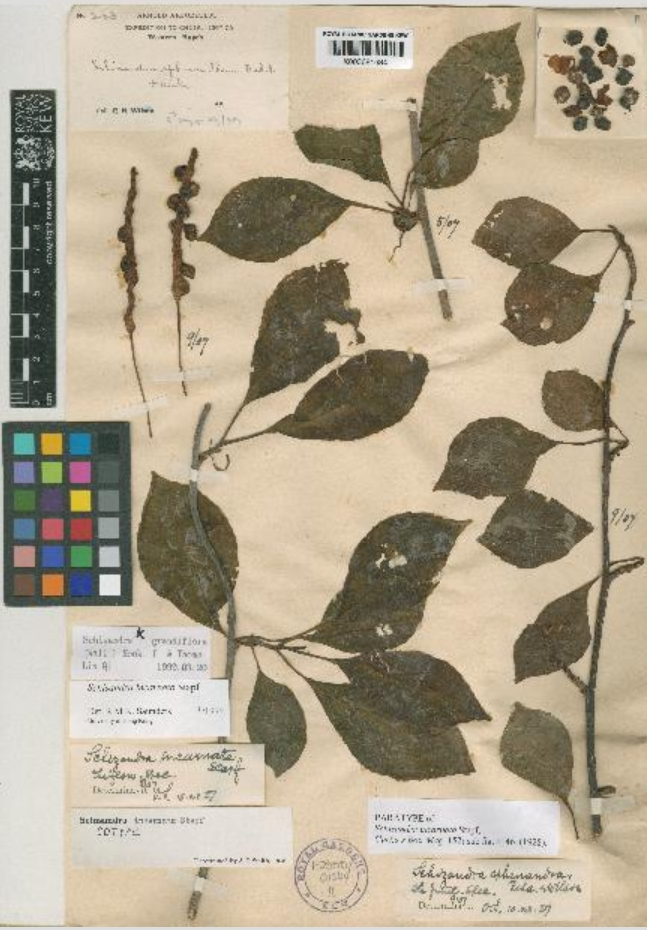

Scientific classification
- Kingdom: Plantae
- Clade: Embryophytes
- Clade: Tracheophytes
- Clade: Spermatophytes
- Clade: Angiosperms
- Order: Austrobaileyales
- Family: Schisandraceae
- Genus: Schisandra
- Species: S. incarnata

Binomial name
- Schisandra incarnata Stapf

= Schisandra incarnata =

Species of flowering plant

Schisandra incarnata is a species of flowering plant in the family Schisandraceae. It is native to China and India.

Schisandra incarnata is a climbing plant. It has papery leaves, pink tepals, and edible fruits.

The species was described in 1928. It is used in medicine.

== Distribution ==
Schisandra incarnata is native to west Hubei, China, and Arunachal Pradesh, India. It grows in thickets and forests, at elevations of 1,600–2,300 metres (5,200–7,500 ft).

== Taxonomy ==
Schisandra incarnata was named by Otto Stapf in 1928.

== Description ==
Schisandra incarnata is a climbing plant. It is smooth throughout.

The leaves are papery in texture, 7–12.5 centimetres (2.8–4.9 in) long, and 3.5–5.5 centimetres (1.4–2.2 in) wide. The leaf-bearing branches are long. The leaf stems are 1.2–3.5 centimetres (0.47–1.38 in) long.

The tepals are pink. The male flowers have twenty-eight stamens, and the female flowers have around seventy carpels. Both male and female flowers have 1.6–3.5 centimetres (0.63–1.38 in) stems. The plant flowers in May and June.

The seed case is smooth. The fruits grow on 3.5–5 centimetres (1.4–2.0 in) stems. The plant fruits in August and September.

== Uses ==
Schisandra incarnata is used in medicine, and produces edible fruit.

== Nomenclature ==
In Chinese, the species is known as 兴山五味子 (xing shan wu wei zi).
