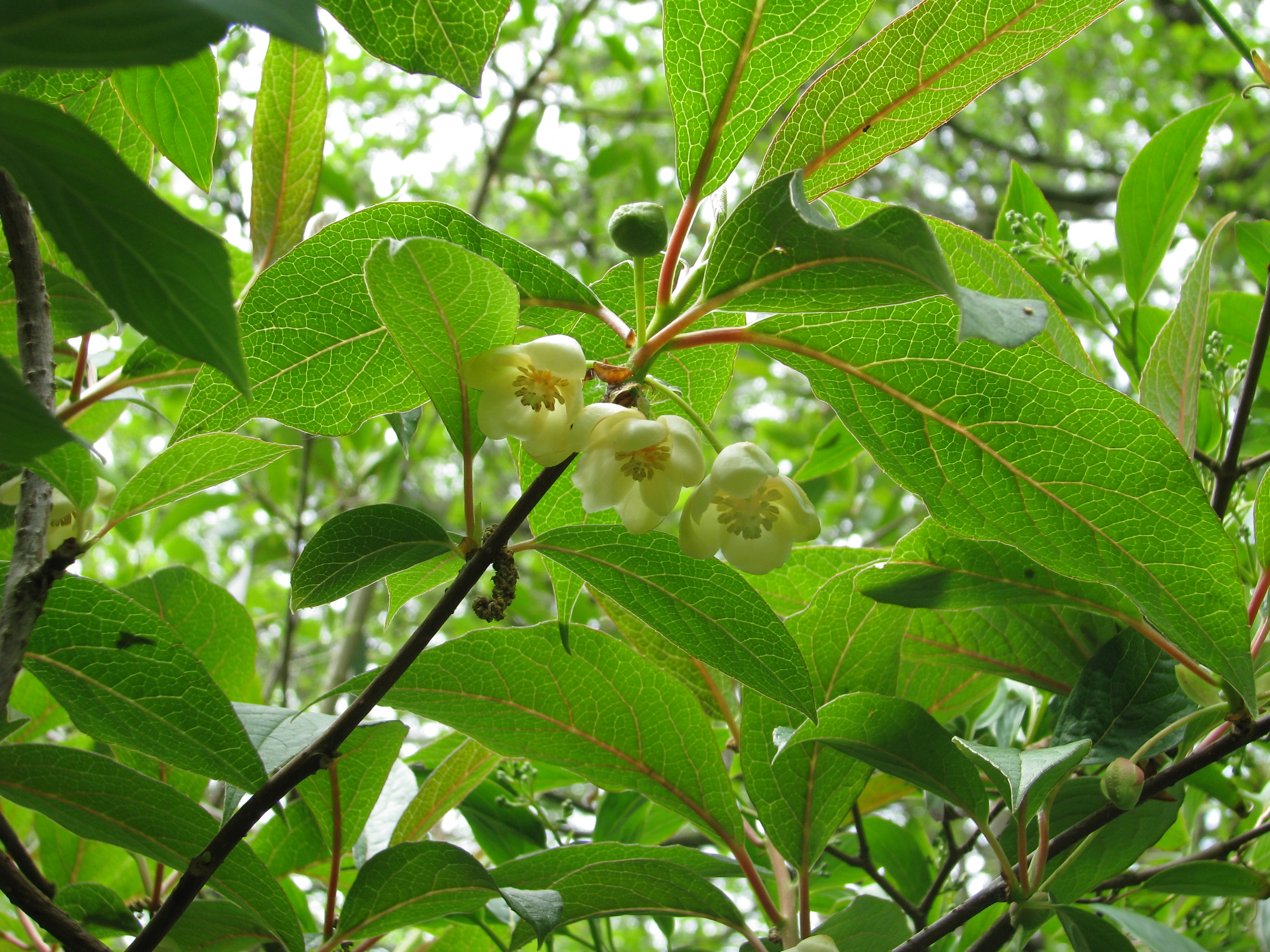
- Schisandra grandiflora has cream-colored, pendant flowers

Scientific classification
- Kingdom: Plantae
- Clade: Embryophytes
- Clade: Tracheophytes
- Clade: Angiosperms
- Order: Austrobaileyales
- Family: Schisandraceae
- Genus: Schisandra
- Species: S. grandiflora

Binomial name
- Schisandra grandiflora (Wall.) Hook.f. & Thomson

Synonyms
- Kadsura grandiflora Wall.; Sphaerostema grandiflorum (Wall.) Blume

= Schisandra grandiflora =

Species of flowering plant

Schisandra grandiflora, called the large-flowered magnolia vine, is a species of flowering plant in the genus Schisandra, native to the Himalayas and Tibet. A deciduous, twining climber, it has gained the Royal Horticultural Society's Award of Garden Merit as an ornamental.
