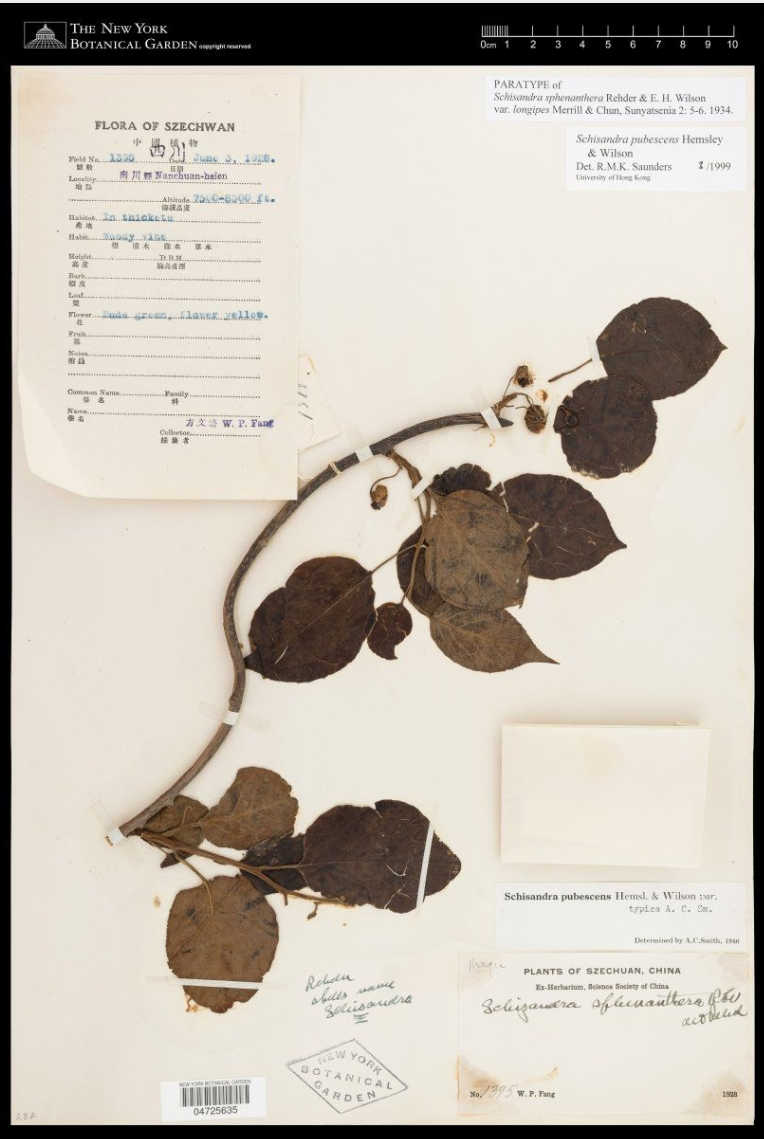

Scientific classification
- Kingdom: Plantae
- Clade: Embryophytes
- Clade: Tracheophytes
- Clade: Spermatophytes
- Clade: Angiosperms
- Order: Austrobaileyales
- Family: Schisandraceae
- Genus: Schisandra
- Species: S. longipes

Binomial name
- Schisandra longipes (Merr. & Chun) R.M.K.Saunders

Synonyms
- Schisandra henryi var. longipes (Merr. & Chun) A.C.Sm.; Schisandra sphenanthera var. longipes Merr. & Chun

= Schisandra longipes =

Species of flowering plant

Schisandra longipes is a species of flowering plant in the family Schisandraceae. It is native to China.

Schisandra longipes is a climbing plant with papery leaves, and pale-yellow tepals. It was described in 1934, and was recognised as a species in 2000.

== Taxonomy ==
Schisandra longipes was described by Elmer Drew Merrill and Woon Young Chun in 1934, as Schisandra sphenanthera var. longipes. In 2000, Richard M.K. Saunders described Schisandra longipes as a species.

== Distribution ==
Schisandra longipes is native to the subtropical biome of China (northern Guangdong and northern Guangxi). It grows in forests, and often near rivers, at elevations of 500–1,400 metres (1,600–4,600 ft).

== Description ==
Schisandra longipes is a climbing plant.

The leaf-bearing branches are elongated. The leaf stems are 1.9–6 centimetres (0.75–2.36 in) long. The leaves are papery to subleathery in texture, and elliptical to ovate in shape. They measure 7.5–13 centimetres (3.0–5.1 in) long, and 3.5–7.5 centimetres (1.4–3.0 in) wide.

The flowers have six to eight pale yellow tepals. The male flowers have 2.3–4.8 centimetres (0.91–1.89 in) stalks, and eighteen to twenty-eight stamens. The female flowers have 5.4–7.1 centimetres (2.1–2.8 in) stalks, and thirty-six to fifty-five carpels. Schisandra longipes flowers in April and May.

The seed case has tubercules. Schisandra longipes fruits in July and August.

== Nomenclature ==
In Chinese, the species is known as 长柄五味子 (chang bing wu wei zi).
