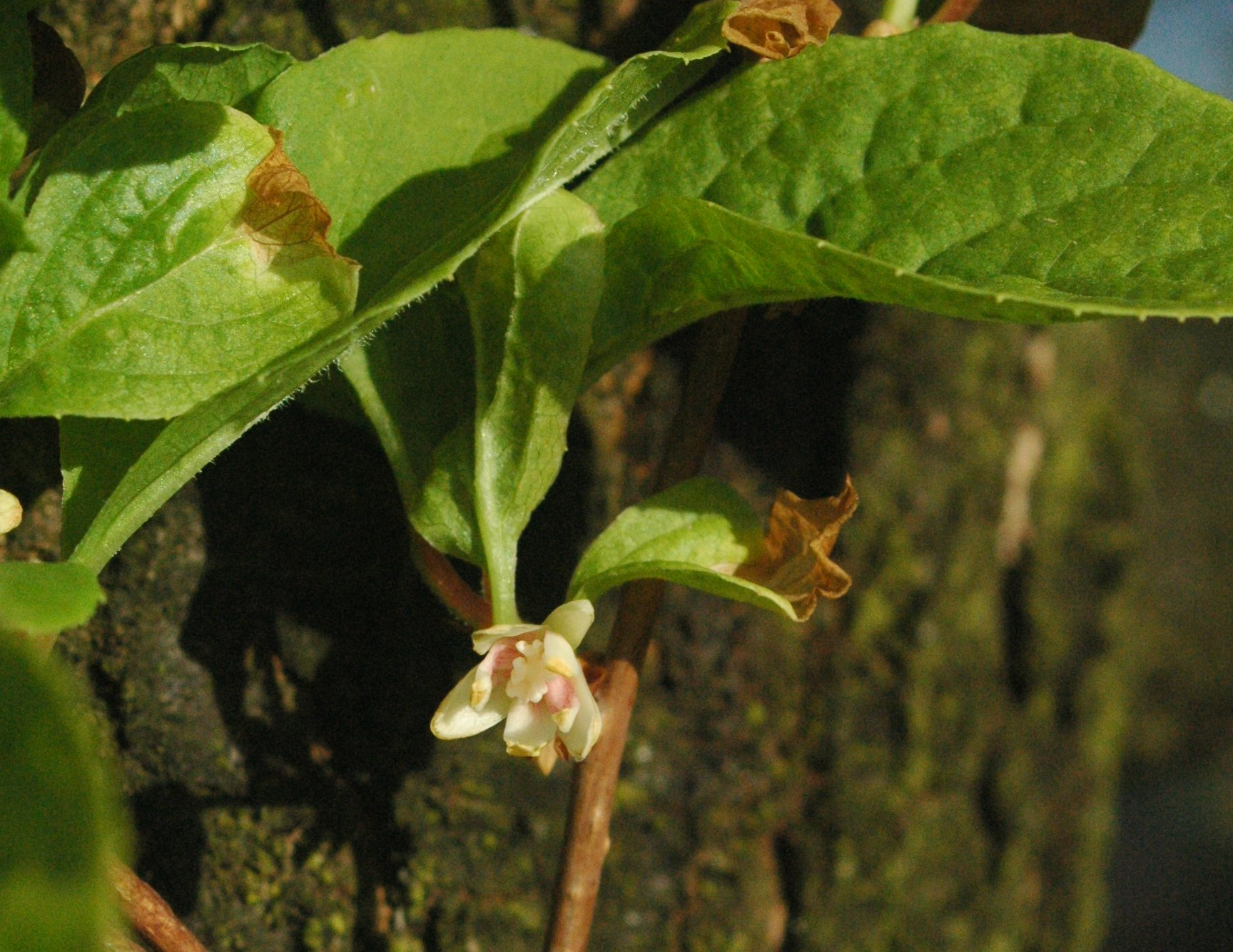

Scientific classification
- Kingdom: Plantae
- Clade: Tracheophytes
- Clade: Angiosperms
- Order: Austrobaileyales
- Family: Schisandraceae; Blume

Genera
- Schisandra; Kadsura; Illicium

= Schisandraceae =

Schisandraceae Temporal range: Late Cretaceous - present Possible Albian record

Family of flowering plants

Schisandraceae is a family of flowering plants with 3 known genera and a total of 92 known species. Such a family has been recognized by most taxonomists, at least for the past several decades. Before that, the plants concerned were assigned to family Magnoliaceae and Illiciaceae.

The APG IV and APG III systems of taxonomy recognize this family and place it on the order Austrobaileyales.

The APG II system, of 2003, also recognizes such a family. It places the family in order Austrobaileyales, which in turn is accepted as being among the most basic lineages in the clade angiosperms. APG II assumes this to be a family of three genera, the Schisandraceae sensu lato. This family consists of woody plants, containing essential oils.

- Schisandraceae
  - - Kadsura
    - Schisandra
  - Illicium

However, APG II does allow the option of segregating the genus Illicium as the family Illiciaceae. This leaves only two genera in the family Schisandraceae sensu stricto, consisting of Schisandra and Kadsura, totalling several dozen species, which are found in tropical to temperate regions of East and Southeast Asia and North America.

The APG system, of 1998, recognized both the families Schisandraceae sensu stricto and Illiciaceae, unplaced as to order. It regarded both families as being among the most basic lineages in the clade angiosperms.

The Cronquist system, of 1981, treated the plants in the family (in its wider sense) as two separate families, which together constituted

the order Illiciales,

in subclass Magnoliidae,

in class Magnoliopsida [=dicotyledons],

of division Magnoliophyta [=angiosperms].

== Genera ==
Image	Genus	Living species
	Kadsura Kaempf. ex Juss., 1810	Kadsura acsmithii - Borneo; Kadsura angustifolia - Guangxi, Vietnam; Kadsura borneensis - Sabah; Kadsura celebica - Sulawesi; Kadsura coccinea - S China, N Indochina; Kadsura heteroclita - China, Indian subcontinent, Indochina, Borneo, Sumatra; Kadsura induta - Yunnan, Guangxi, Vietnam; Kadsura japonica - Japan, Korea, Nansei-shoto, Taiwan; Kadsura lanceolata - Malaysia, Borneo, Sumatra, Sulawesi, Maluku; Kadsura longipedunculata - China; Kadsura marmorata - Borneo, Philippines; Kadsura oblongifolia - Guangxi, Guangdong, Hainan; Kadsura philippinensis - Philippines; Kadsura renchangiana - Guangxi; Kadsura scandens - Pen Malaysia, Sumatra, Java, Bali; Kadsura verrucosa - Laos, Vietnam, Pen Malaysia, Sumatra, Java
	Illicium L., 1759	Illicium angustisepalum - S China; Illicium anisatum – Japan, South Korea, Taiwan; Illicium arborescens - Taiwan; Illicium brevistylum - Guangdong, Guangxi, Hunan, Yunnan; Illicium burmanicum - Yunnan, Myanmar; Illicium cubense - Cuba; Illicium difengpi - Guangxi; Illicium dunnianum - S China; Illicium floridanum- United States (FL GA AL MS LA); Illicium griffithii - Tibet, Bhutan, Arunachal Pradesh; Illicium guajaibonense - Cuba; Illicium henryi - S China; Illicium jiadifengpi - S China; Illicium lanceolatum - S China; Illicium leiophyllum - Hong Kong; Illicium macranthum - Yunnan; Illicium majus - S China, Vietnam, Myanmar; Illicium merrillianum - Yunnan, Myanmar; Illicium mexicanum - Veracruz; Illicium micranthum - Yunnan; Illicium modestum - Yunnan; Illicium pachyphyllum - Guangxi; Illicium parviflorum – yellow anise - United States (FL GA SC); Illicium petelotii - Yunnan, Vietnam; Illicium philippinense - Philippines, Taiwan; Illicium simonsii - S China, Assam, Myanmar; Illicium tashiroi - Taiwan, Nansei-shoto; Illicium tenuifolium - Vietnam; Illicium ternstroemioides - Fujian, Hainan; Illicium tsaii - Yunnan; Illicium verum – star anise, Chinese star-anise, staranise tree - Guangxi; Illicium wardii - Yunnan, Myanmar
	Schisandra Michx., 1803	Schisandra arisanensis - S China incl Taiwan; Schisandra bicolor - Guangxi, Hunan, Yunnan, Zhejiang; Schisandra chinensis - Russian Far East, NE China, Korea, Japan; Schisandra elongata - Java; Schisandra glabra - Hidalgo, United States (LA AR MS AL TN KY GA FL SC NC); Schisandra glaucescens - Chongqing, Hubei; Schisandra grandiflora - Tibet, Sikkim, Nepal, Bhutan, Assam, Uttarakhand; Schisandra henryi - S China; Schisandra incarnata - Hubei; Schisandra lancifolia - Sichuan, Yunnan; Schisandra longipes - Guangdong, Guangxi; Schisandra macrocarpa - Yunnan; Schisandra micrantha - Manipur, Yunnan, Myanmar; Schisandra neglecta - Sikkim, Nepal, Bhutan, Assam, Myanmar, Yunnan; Schisandra parapropinqua - Guizhou, Yunnan; Schisandra perulata - Thailand, Vietnam; Schisandra plena - Arunachal Pradesh, Yunnan; Schisandra propinqua - China, Assam, Nepal, Myanmar, Thailand, Java, Bali; Schisandra pubescens - Sichuan, Hubei; Schisandra pubinervis - Hubei, Sichuan; Schisandra repanda - Korea, Japan; Schisandra rubriflora - Arunachal Pradesh, Yunnan, Myanmar, Sichuan; Schisandra sphaerandra - Sichuan, Yunnan; Schisandra sphenanthera - China; Schisandra tomentella - Sichuan

== Pollination ==
Schisandaceae are pollinated predominantly by nocturnal gall midges that lay their eggs in the male and female flowers (in Schisandraceae species with unisexual flowers) or the male-stage and female-stage flowers (in species with bisexual flowers). The larvae of these midges develop in the floral tissue once it has dropped to the ground, feeding on floral exudates (not ovules or pollen).
