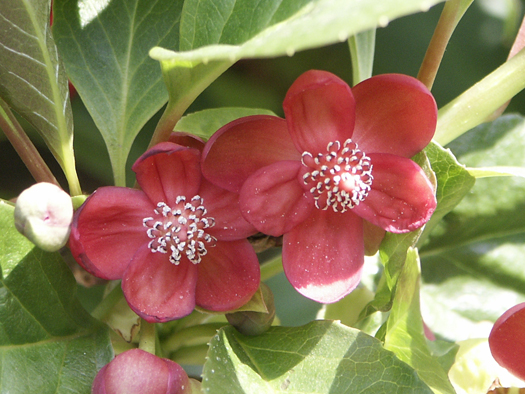

Scientific classification
- Kingdom: Plantae
- Clade: Tracheophytes
- Clade: Angiosperms
- Order: Austrobaileyales
- Family: Schisandraceae
- Genus: Schisandra
- Species: S. rubriflora

Binomial name
- Schisandra rubriflora Rehder & E.H.Wilson

= Schisandra rubriflora =

Species of flowering plant

Schisandra rubriflora (Chinese: 红花五味子; pinyin: hónghuā wǔwèizǐ; lit. 'red flower five flavor fruit'), the Chinese magnolia vine, is a species of flowering plant in the family Schisandraceae that is native to China (West Sichuan and North Yunnan), India and Myanmar. Growing to 8 m (26 ft) tall, it is a deciduous twining climber with leathery leaves. Waxy red, cup-shaped pendulous blooms in summer are followed by red berries.

The Latin specific epithet rubriflora means red-flowered.

This plant is grown as an ornamental garden subject. It is fully hardy down to −15 °C (5 °F). It has gained the Royal Horticultural Society's Award of Garden Merit.
