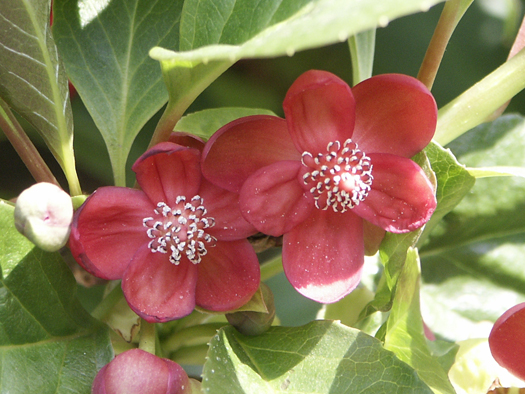
- Schisandra rubriflora

Scientific classification
- Kingdom: Plantae
- Clade: Tracheophytes
- Clade: Angiosperms
- Order: Austrobaileyales; Takht. ex Reveal

Families
- Austrobaileyaceae Croizat; Schisandraceae Blume; Trimeniaceae Gibbs

= Austrobaileyales =

Austrobaileyales Temporal range: Albian - recent Possible Barremian record

Order of flowering plants

Austrobaileyales is an order of flowering plants consisting of about 100 species of woody plants growing as trees, shrubs and lianas. A well known example is Illicium verum, commonly known as star anise. The order belongs to the group of basal angiosperms, the ANA grade (Amborellales, Nymphaeales, and Austrobaileyales), which diverged earlier from the remaining flowering plants. Austrobaileyales is sister to all remaining extant angiosperms outside the ANA grade.

The order includes just three families of flowering plants: the Austrobaileyaceae, a monotypic family containing the sole genus, Austrobaileya scandens, a woody liana; the Schisandraceae, a family of trees, shrubs, or lianas containing essential oils; and the Trimeniaceae, essential oil-bearing trees and lianas.

== In different classifications ==
Until the early 21st century, the order was only rarely recognised by systems of classification (an exception is the Reveal system).

The APG system, of 1998, did not recognize such an order. The APG II system, of 2003, does accept this order and places it among the basal angiosperms, that is: it does not belong to any further clade. APG II uses this circumscription:

- order Austrobaileyales
  - family Austrobaileyaceae, one species of woody vines from Australia
  - family Schisandraceae [+ family Illiciaceae], several dozen species of woody plants, found in tropical to temperate regions of East and Southeast Asia and the Caribbean. The best known of those is Star anise.
  - family Trimeniaceae, half-a-dozen species of woody plants found in subtropical to tropical Southeast Asia, eastern Australia and the Pacific Islands

Note: "+ ..."=optional segregate family, that may be split off from the preceding family. The Cronquist system, of 1981, also placed the plants in families Illiciaceae and Schisandraceae together, but as separate families, united at the rank of order, in the order Illiciales.

- Angiosperms
  - Amborella
  - - Nymphaeales
    - - Austrobaileyales
      - - - - magnoliids
            - Chloranthales
          - - monocots
            - - Ceratophyllum
              - eudicots

The phylogeny of the flowering plants, as of APG III (2009).

- Austrobaileyales
  - Austrobaileyaceae
  - - Schisandraceae
    - Trimeniaceae

Internal relationship of Austrobaileyales.
