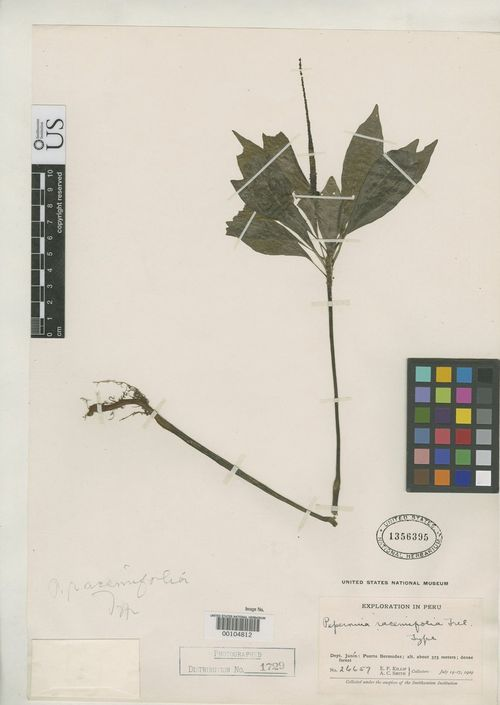

Scientific classification
- Kingdom: Plantae
- Clade: Tracheophytes
- Clade: Angiosperms
- Clade: Magnoliids
- Order: Piperales
- Family: Piperaceae
- Genus: Peperomia
- Species: P. racemifolia

Binomial name
- Peperomia racemifolia Trel.

= Peperomia racemifolia =

Species of flowering plant in the pepper family

Peperomia racemifolia is a species of epiphyte in the genus Peperomia that is endemic in Peru. It grows on wet tropical biomes. Its conservation status is Not Threatened.

== Description ==
The type specimen were collected near Puerto Bermúdez, Peru, at an altitude of 375 meters (1,230 ft).

Peperomia racemifolia is a simple, erect, glabrous herb with a stem 2–3 mm thick, leafless for 20–30 cm (8–12 in) toward the base. The few alternate leaves are crowded in the uppermost 2–3 cm of the stem. They are oblanceolate, bluntly acuminate, with a cuneate base, measuring 6–8 cm long and about 2 cm wide, and are pinnately nerved throughout. The slender petiole is 2 cm long. The terminal spikes are 100 mm (3.9 in) long and 1 mm thick, with somewhat spaced flowers, and are borne on a filiform peduncle 3 cm long. The rachis is obscurely somewhat puberulous.

== Taxonomy and naming ==
It was described in 1936 by William Trelease in Publications of the Field Museum of Natural History, Botanical Series 13, from specimens collected by Ellsworth Paine Killip and Albert Charles Smith. The specific epithet racemifolia is derived from the Latin racemus and folium, referring to its leaf or flower arrangement.

== Distribution and habitat ==
It is endemic in Peru. It grows on a epiphyte environment and is a herb. It grows on wet tropical biomes.

== Conservation ==
This species was assessed as Threatened in a preliminary report.
