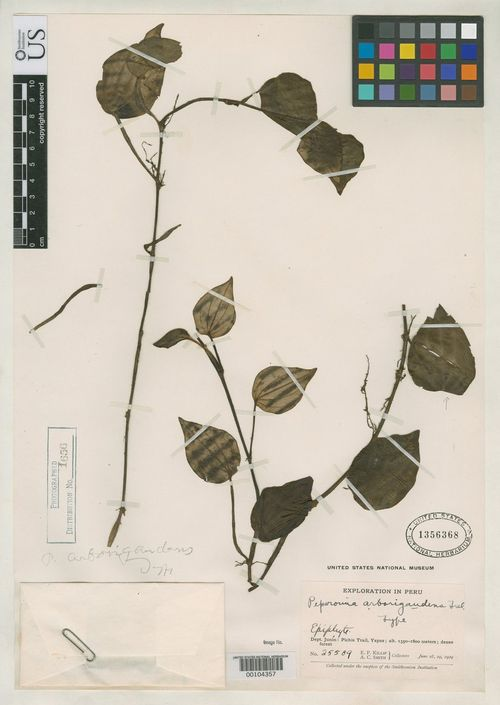

Scientific classification
- Kingdom: Plantae
- Clade: Tracheophytes
- Clade: Angiosperms
- Clade: Magnoliids
- Order: Piperales
- Family: Piperaceae
- Genus: Peperomia
- Species: P. arborigaudens

Binomial name
- Peperomia arborigaudens Trel.

= Peperomia arborigaudens =

Species of flowering plant

Peperomia arborigaudens is a species of epiphyte in the genus Peperomia that is endemic in Peru. It grows on wet tropical biomes. Its conservation status is Threatened.

== Description ==
The type specimen were collected near Yapas, Peru, at an altitude of 1,350–1,600 meters (4,430–5,250 ft).

Peperomia arborigaudens is a creeping, pendent epiphyte with slender, elongated stems covered in short, soft hairs. The leaves are alternate, ovate, and acuminate, with a very short and obscure peltate attachment. The leaf base is rounded to nearly truncate, and each blade measures 4 to 5.5 cm in length and 3 to 4 cm in width, with five to seven nerves. Young leaves are tomentulose on the underside, becoming sparsely pilose and glandular-granulose with age. When dried, the leaves are thin and take on a more or less rosy hue. The petioles are 3 to 5 mm long and loosely villous. The flower spikes are terminal and slender, reaching 90 mm in length, borne on a filiform, somewhat villous peduncle 2 cm long. The floral bracts are minute, rounded, and peltate.

== Taxonomy and naming ==
It was described in 1936 by Truman G. Yuncker in Publications of the Field Museum of Natural History, Botanical Series 13, from specimens collected by Ellsworth Paine Killip & Dorothea Eliza Smith. It got its name from the description of the type specimen.

== Distribution and habitat ==
It is endemic in Peru. It grows on a epiphyte environment and is a herb. It grows on wet tropical biomes.

== Conservation ==
This species is assessed as Threatened, in a preliminary report.
