= Peperomia crassulicaulis =

Scientific classification
- Kingdom: Plantae
- Clade: Tracheophytes
- Clade: Angiosperms
- Clade: Magnoliids
- Order: Piperales
- Family: Piperaceae
- Genus: Peperomia
- Species: P. crassulicaulis

Binomial name
- Peperomia crassulicaulis Trel.

Species of flowering plant

Peperomia crassulicaulis is a species of epiphyte in the genus Peperomia that is endemic in Peru. It grows on wet tropical biomes. Its conservation status is Threatened.

== Description ==
The type specimen were collected near Carpapata, Peru, at an altitude of 2,400 meters (7,900 ft).

Peperomia crassulicaulis is a glabrous, succulent, somewhat shrubby plant. Its erect stems are 3–4 mm thick, sparsely branched above, but arise in large numbers from a thick (up to 2 cm) yellowish base, with short internodes. The leaves are in whorls of 6 at the nodes. They are elliptical, with a slightly notched tip and an acute base, measuring 10 mm long and 4–5 mm wide. When dry, they are hard, somewhat revolute, opaque with obscure venation, and have a minutely granular underside. The petiole is 2 mm long. The terminal spikes are 140 mm long and 4 mm thick, with loosely inserted flowers, and are borne on a 15 mm peduncle. The flowers are immersed in small pits on the rachis. The ovary is ovoid with an oblique stigma.

== Taxonomy and naming ==
It was described in 1936 by William Trelease in Publications of the Field Museum of Natural History, Botanical Series 13, from specimens collected by Ellsworth Paine Killip & Dorothea Eliza Smith. It got its epithet from the resemblance to plants in the family Crassulaceae.

== Distribution and habitat ==
It is endemic in Peru. It grows on a epiphyte environment and is a herb. It grows on wet tropical biomes.

== Conservation ==
This species is assessed as Threatened, in a preliminary report.
