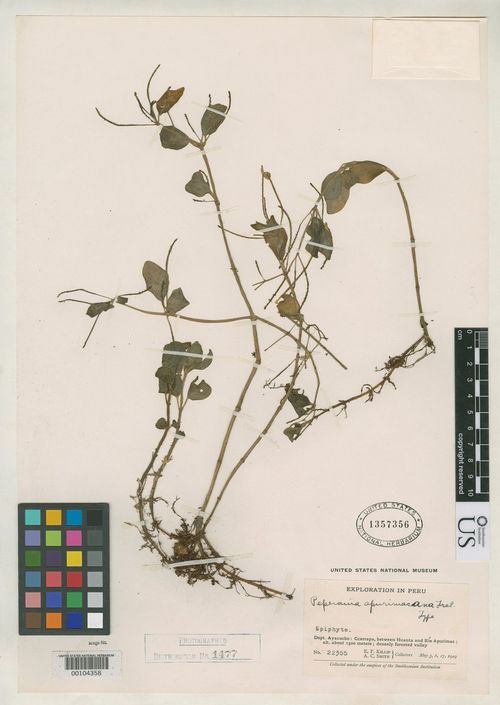

Scientific classification
- Kingdom: Plantae
- Clade: Tracheophytes
- Clade: Angiosperms
- Clade: Magnoliids
- Order: Piperales
- Family: Piperaceae
- Genus: Peperomia
- Species: P. apurimacana

Binomial name
- Peperomia apurimacana Trel.

= Peperomia apurimacana =

Species of flowering plant

Peperomia apurimacana is a species of epiphyte in the genus Peperomia that is endemic in Peru. It grows on wet tropical biomes. Its conservation status is Threatened.

== Description ==
The type specimen were collected near Carrapa, Peru, at an altitude of 1,500 meters (4,900 ft).

Peperomia apurimacana is a tall, succulent epiphyte with a branching growth form. Its stems are 2 to 4 mm thick and covered in a curly, woolly pubescence. The leaves are opposite in arrangement, somewhat rhombic-elliptical in shape, with both ends tapering to a sharp point. The lower leaves are reduced and obovate with a truncate tip. Leaf blades range from 3 cm long and 1 cm wide to as large as 5 cm (2.0 in) long and 3 cm (1.2 in) wide, featuring three prominent nerves. They bear a persistent curly pubescence and appear thin when dried. The petioles are also curly-pubescent and vary from 5 to 10 mm long, occasionally reaching up to 15 mm. The flower spikes are terminal and axillary, thread-like in form, measuring 3–4 cm (1.2–1.6 in) long with somewhat loosely arranged flowers. Each flower is accompanied by short pseudopedicels. The spikes are borne on a translucent, minutely pubescent peduncle 10 to 15 mm long. The floral bracts are rounded and peltate, shield-shaped with the peduncle attached at the center.

== Taxonomy and naming ==
It was described in 1936 by William Trelease in Publications of the Field Museum of Natural History, Botanical Series 13, from specimens collected by Ellsworth Paine Killip & Dorothea Eliza Smith. It got its name from the location where the type specimen was collected.

== Distribution and habitat ==
It is endemic in Peru. It grows on a epiphyte environment and is a herb. It grows on wet tropical biomes.

== Conservation ==
This species is assessed as Threatened, in a preliminary report.
