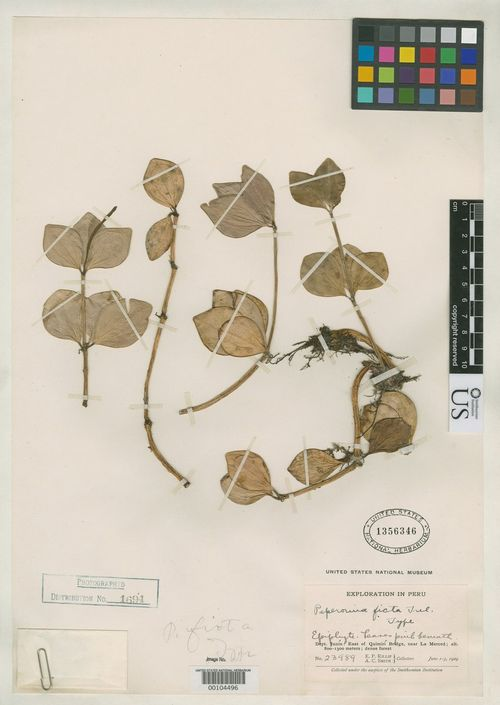

Scientific classification
- Kingdom: Plantae
- Clade: Tracheophytes
- Clade: Angiosperms
- Clade: Magnoliids
- Order: Piperales
- Family: Piperaceae
- Genus: Peperomia
- Species: P. ficta

Binomial name
- Peperomia ficta Trel.

= Peperomia ficta =

Species of flowering plant

Peperomia ficta is a species of epiphyte in the genus Peperomia that is endemic in Peru. It grows on wet tropical biomes. Its conservation status is Threatened.

== Description ==
The type specimen were collected near La Merced, Peru, at an altitude of 800–1,300 meters (2,600–4,300 ft).

Peperomia ficta is a robust, cespitose-creeping, succulent, epiphytic herb. The stem is 2–4 mm thick, glabrous, and sulcate when dry. The leaves are typically in whorls of 3. They are round-elliptic to somewhat ovate or somewhat obovate, bluntly subacuminate, with an acute base, measuring 3–4 cm long and 2–3 cm wide. They are about 5-nerved, glabrous, and when dry are hard, revolute, and opaque. The petiole is 5 mm long and brown-puberulous. The terminal spikes, when young, are 30 mm long and 2 mm thick, borne on a 15 mm peduncle.

== Taxonomy and naming ==
It was described in 1936 by William Trelease in Publications of the Field Museum of Natural History, Botanical Series 13, from specimens collected by Ellsworth Paine Killip and Dorothea Eliza Smith. It got its epithet from the Latin wikt:ficta, referring to the species that resembles or could be mistaken for another.

== Distribution and habitat ==
It is endemic in Peru. It grows on a epiphyte environment and is a herb. It grows on wet tropical biomes.

== Conservation ==
This species is assessed as Threatened, in a preliminary report.
