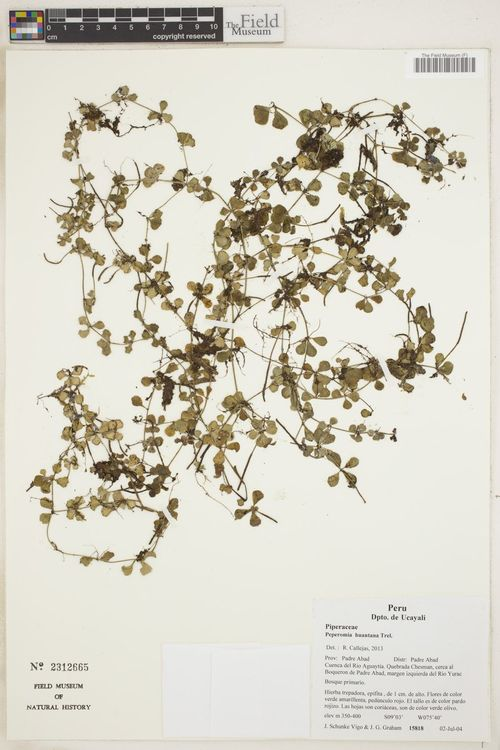

Scientific classification
- Kingdom: Plantae
- Clade: Tracheophytes
- Clade: Angiosperms
- Clade: Magnoliids
- Order: Piperales
- Family: Piperaceae
- Genus: Peperomia
- Species: P. huantana

Binomial name
- Peperomia huantana Trel.

= Peperomia huantana =

Species of flowering plant

Peperomia huantana is a species of epiphytic herb in the genus Peperomia that is native to Peru. It grows on wet tropical biomes. Its conservation status is Threatened.

== Description ==
The type specimen were collected at Huanta, Peru.

Peperomia huantana is a somewhat small, creeping, bark-dwelling herb with a stem about 1 mm thick, sparsely covered in crisp, somewhat villous hairs. The leaves are in whorls of 2–4 at the nodes. They are rhombic-obovate to somewhat elliptic, obtuse, with an acute base, measuring 10–15 mm long and 7–10 mm wide. The underside is sparsely somewhat villous and paler, and the leaves dry to a thin, opaque texture. The petiole is 2–3 mm long. The (apparently terminal) spikes are filiform, 60 mm long, and borne on a 20 mm peduncle. The berries are ovoid, pointed, and bear a pseudocupula, with an apical stigma.

== Taxonomy and naming ==
It was described in 1936 by William Trelease in Publications of the Field Museum of Natural History, Botanical Series 13, from specimens collected by Ellsworth Paine Killip and Albert Charles Smith.

The epithet huantana is derived from the type locality in Huanta, Peru.

== Distribution and habitat ==
It is native to Peru. It grows as an epiphytic herb. It grows on wet tropical biomes.

== Conservation ==
This species is assessed as Threatened, in a preliminary report.
