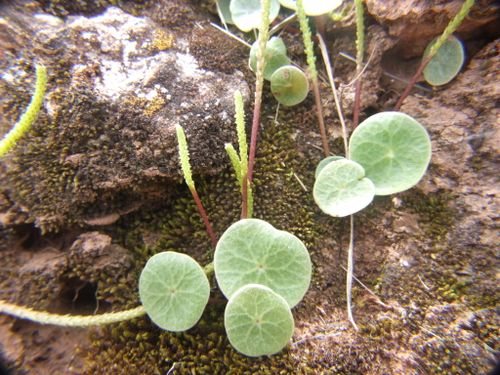

Scientific classification
- Kingdom: Plantae
- Clade: Tracheophytes
- Clade: Angiosperms
- Clade: Magnoliids
- Order: Piperales
- Family: Piperaceae
- Genus: Peperomia
- Species: P. polycephala

Binomial name
- Peperomia polycephala Trel.

= Peperomia polycephala =

Species of plant

Peperomia polycephala is a species of terrestrial or epiphytic herb in the genus Peperomia that is native to Peru. It grows on wet tropical biomes. Its conservation status is Threatened.

== Description ==
The type specimen were collected at Aina, Peru at an altitude of 700–1,000 meters (2,300–3,300 ft) above sea level.

Peperomia polycephala is a small, glabrous, stemless herb. The leaves arise from the apex of a thick, compactly branched rhizome. They are orbicular, peltate toward the center, measuring 2–4 centimetres (0.8–1.6 in) wide, and are thin when dry. The petiole is 5 centimeters (2.0 in) long or more. The spikes are filiform, 90–100 millimeters (3.5–3.9 in) long, with a very slender peduncle nearly equaling the petiole. The berries are ellipsoid-ovoid with a slender basal projection supporting the style, and have an apical stigma.

== Taxonomy and naming ==
It was described in 1936 by William Trelease in Publications of the Field Museum of Natural History, Botanical Series 13, from specimens collected by Ellsworth Paine Killip & Albert Charles Smith.

The epithet is derived from the Greek poly and kephalē, meaning "many-headed," referring to the numerous flower spikes emerging from the compact, many-branched rhizome apex.

== Distribution and habitat ==
It is native to Peru. It grows as a terrestrial or epiphytic herb. It grows on wet tropical biomes.

== Conservation ==
This species is assessed as Threatened, in a preliminary report.
