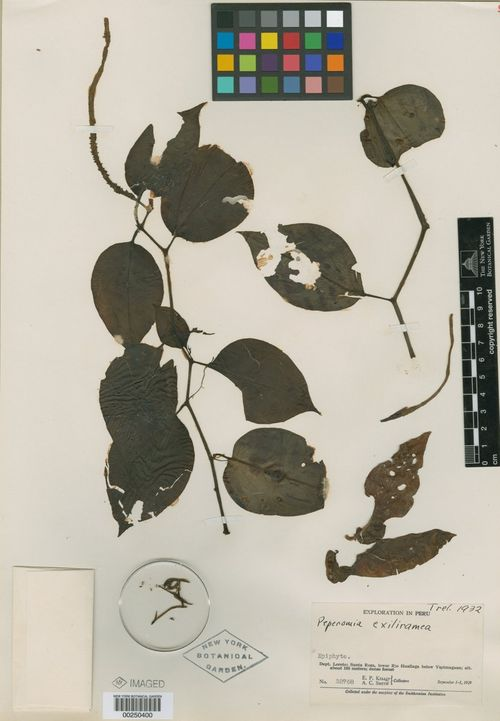

Scientific classification
- Kingdom: Plantae
- Clade: Tracheophytes
- Clade: Angiosperms
- Clade: Magnoliids
- Order: Piperales
- Family: Piperaceae
- Genus: Peperomia
- Species: P. exiliramea

Binomial name
- Peperomia exiliramea Trel.

= Peperomia exiliramea =

Species of flowering plant

Peperomia exiliramea is a species of epiphyte in the genus Peperomia that is endemic in Peru. It grows on wet tropical biomes. Its conservation status is Threatened.

== Description ==
The type specimen were collected near Santa Rosa, Peru, at an altitude of 135 meters (443 ft).

Peperomia exiliramea is a rather large, glabrous, epiphytic herb with a stem about 3 mm thick. The alternate leaves are elliptic, acutely acuminate, with an acute base, measuring 11–12 cm (4.3–4.7 in) long and 5–6 cm (2.0–2.4 in) wide. They are slenderly pinnate-nerved from the lower half and, when dry, are thin in texture. The petiole is 1–2 cm long. The solitary spikes terminate short, leafless sympodial branchlets that are about the same length as the spike and bear two narrow bracts at the base. The spikes are 15 cm (5.9 in) long and 2 mm thick or larger. The ovary is rounded with an acute, somewhat beak-like tip.

== Taxonomy and naming ==
It was described in 1936 by William Trelease in Publications of the Field Museum of Natural History, Botanical Series 13, from specimens collected by Ellsworth Paine Killip & Dorothea Eliza Smith. It got its epithet from the Latin wikt:exilis + wikt:ramus, referring to the slender, leafless branchlets that bear the spikes.

== Distribution and habitat ==
It is endemic in Peru. It grows on a epiphyte environment and is a herb. It grows on wet tropical biomes.

== Conservation ==
This species is assessed as Threatened, in a preliminary report.
