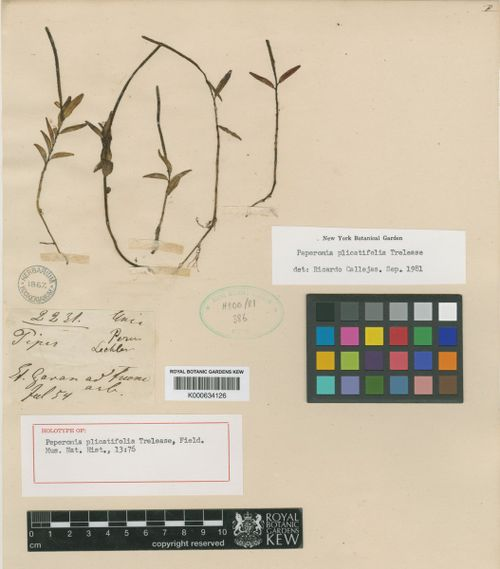

Scientific classification
- Kingdom: Plantae
- Clade: Embryophytes
- Clade: Tracheophytes
- Clade: Angiosperms
- Clade: Magnoliids
- Order: Piperales
- Family: Piperaceae
- Genus: Peperomia
- Species: P. plicatifolia

Binomial name
- Peperomia plicatifolia Trel.

= Peperomia plicatifolia =

Species of herb

Peperomia plicatifolia is a species of terrestrial or epiphytic herb in the genus Peperomia that is native to Peru. It grows on wet tropical biomes. Its conservation status is threatened.

== Description ==
The type specimen were collected at Puerto Bermúdez, Peru at an altitude of 375 meters above sea level.

Peperomia plicatifolia is a somewhat small, glabrous, stoloniferous-ascending herb with a slender stem. The alternate leaves are lanceolate to lanceolate-oblong, somewhat acute at both ends, measuring 15 mm long and 4–5 mm wide. They are pinnately nerved from the lower part, typically plicate, leathery, and yellowish. The petiole is very short. The terminal spikes are 30 mm long and 1 mm thick, with a peduncle 10 mm long. The berries are pear-shaped, curved, and stalked, with a subapical stigma.

== Taxonomy and naming ==
It was described in 1936 by William Trelease in Publications of the Field Museum of Natural History, Botanical Series 13, from specimens collected by Ellsworth Paine Killip & Albert Charles Smith.

The epithet plicatifolia combines the Latin plicatus (folded) and folia (leaves), referring to the characteristic lengthwise folds or pleats in the leaves.

== Distribution and habitat ==
It is native to Peru. It grows as a terrestrial or epiphytic herb. It grows on wet tropical biomes.

== Conservation ==
This species has been assessed as threatened in a preliminary report.
