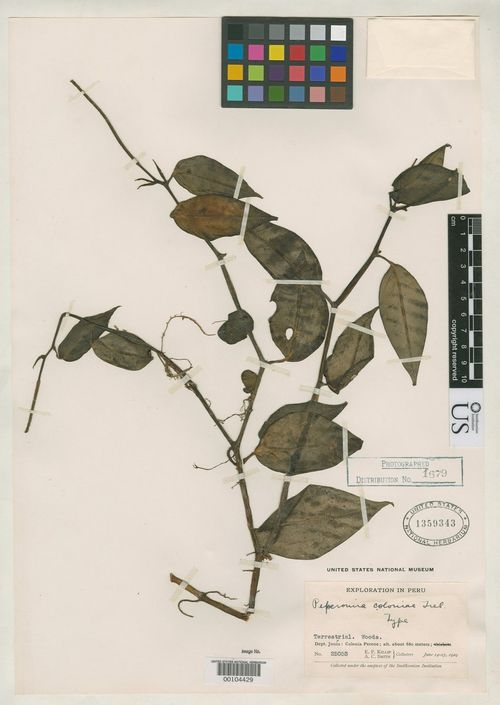

Scientific classification
- Kingdom: Plantae
- Clade: Tracheophytes
- Clade: Angiosperms
- Clade: Magnoliids
- Order: Piperales
- Family: Piperaceae
- Genus: Peperomia
- Species: P. coloniae

Binomial name
- Peperomia coloniae Trel.

= Peperomia coloniae =

Species of flowering plant

Peperomia coloniae is a species of epiphyte in the genus Peperomia that is endemic in Peru. It grows on wet tropical biomes. Its conservation status is Threatened.

== Description ==
The type specimen were collected near Colonia Perené, Peru, at an altitude of 680 meters (2,230 ft).

Peperomia coloniae is a somewhat shrubby, creeping then ascending herb with a sparse, soft pubescence. The alternate leaves are lanceolate, more or less acuminate, with an obtuse base, measuring 5–6 cm long and 2.5–3 cm wide. They are leathery and opaque when dry, with obscure pinnate venation, and have a yellowish underside. The petiole is about 10 mm long. The spikes are terminal, solitary or paired, terminating short, two-bracteate peduncles, and are described simply as being short.

== Taxonomy and naming ==
It was described in 1936 by William Trelease in Publications of the Field Museum of Natural History, Botanical Series 13, from specimens collected by Ellsworth Paine Killip and Dorothea Eliza Smith. It got its name from the location where the type specimen was collected.

== Distribution and habitat ==
It is endemic in Peru. It grows on a epiphyte environment and is a herb. It grows on wet tropical biomes.

== Conservation ==
This species is assessed as Threatened, in a preliminary report.
