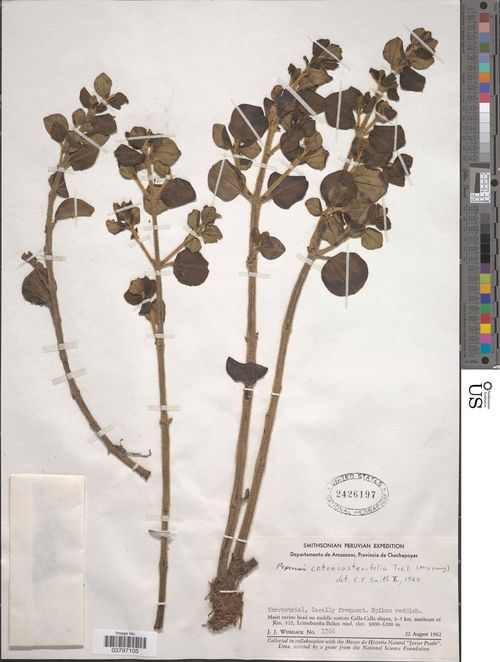

Scientific classification
- Kingdom: Plantae
- Clade: Tracheophytes
- Clade: Angiosperms
- Clade: Magnoliids
- Order: Piperales
- Family: Piperaceae
- Genus: Peperomia
- Species: P. cotoneasterifolia

Binomial name
- Peperomia cotoneasterifolia Trel.

= Peperomia cotoneasterifolia =

Species of flowering plant

Peperomia cotoneasterifolia is a species of epiphyte in the genus Peperomia that is endemic in Peru. It grows on wet tropical biomes. Its conservation status is Threatened.

== Description ==
The type specimen were collected near Carpapata, Peru, at an altitude of 2,700–3,200 meters (8,900–10,500 ft).

Peperomia cotoneasterifolia is a moderately tall, tree-dwelling herb that is more or less branched. The stem is 2–3 mm thick and densely covered with appressed villous hairs when young. The opposite leaves are elliptic-subovate, with an abruptly somewhat acute tip and base, measuring 2–2.5 cm long and 1.5–2 cm wide. They are 3- or obscurely 5-nerved. The upper surface is glabrate, while the pale underside is tomentose. The appressed-pilose petiole is 5 mm long. The axillary spikes are 60 mm (2.4 in) long and 2 mm thick, borne on a 10 mm peduncle. The berries are ovoid, somewhat acute, and have an apical stigma.

== Taxonomy and naming ==
It was described in 1936 by William Trelease in Publications of the Field Museum of Natural History, Botanical Series 13, from specimens collected by Ellsworth Paine Killip and Dorothea Eliza Smith. It got its epithet from the description of the type specimen, which translates to "with leaves like Cotoneaster", referring to the resemblance of folia in the genus Cotoneaster.

== Distribution and habitat ==
It is endemic in Peru. It grows on a epiphyte environment and is a herb. It grows on wet tropical biomes.

== Conservation ==
This species is assessed as Threatened, in a preliminary report.
