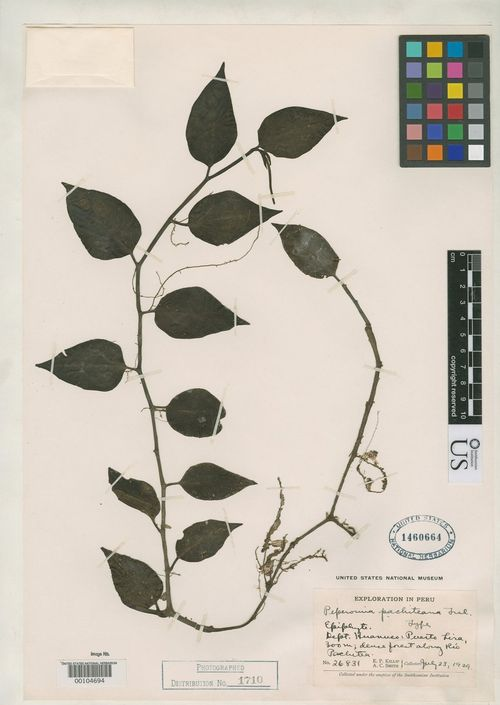

Scientific classification
- Kingdom: Plantae
- Clade: Tracheophytes
- Clade: Angiosperms
- Clade: Magnoliids
- Order: Piperales
- Family: Piperaceae
- Genus: Peperomia
- Species: P. pachiteana

Binomial name
- Peperomia pachiteana Trel.

= Peperomia pachiteana =

Species of plant

Peperomia pachiteana is a species of terrestrial or epiphytic herb in the genus Peperomia that is native to Peru. It grows on wet tropical biomes. Its conservation status is threatened.

== Description ==
The type specimen were collected at Río Pachitea, Peru at an altitude of 300 meters above sea level.

Peperomia pachiteana is a creeping or pendulous, epiphytic herb that is glabrous except for the branches, which bear an evanescent, minute crisp pubescence. The alternate leaves are ovate, acuminate, with a rounded to nearly truncate base, measuring 5–7 cm long and 3–3.5 cm wide. They have obscure pinnate venation and, when dry, are thin, opaque, and dark brown. The petiole is 1 cm long. The spikes are borne in pairs, terminating a short, 2-bracteate branchlet. They are 25 mm long and 1 mm thick, with short peduncles.

== Taxonomy and naming ==
It was described in 1936 by William Trelease in Publications of the Field Museum of Natural History, Botanical Series 13, from specimens collected by Ellsworth Paine Killip & Albert Charles Smith.

The epithet pachiteana is derived from the type locality.

== Distribution and habitat ==
It is native to Peru. It grows as a terrestrial or epiphytic herb. It grows on wet tropical biomes.

== Conservation ==
This species has been assessed as threatened in a preliminary report.
