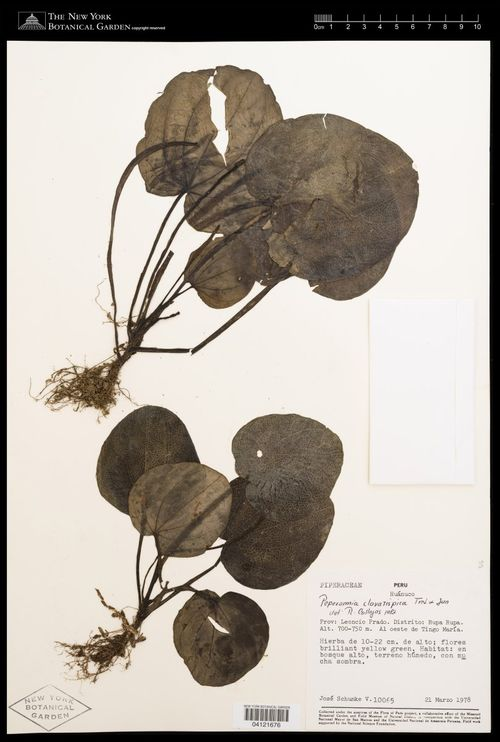

Scientific classification
- Kingdom: Plantae
- Clade: Tracheophytes
- Clade: Angiosperms
- Clade: Magnoliids
- Order: Piperales
- Family: Piperaceae
- Genus: Peperomia
- Species: P. areolata

Binomial name
- Peperomia areolata Trel.

= Peperomia areolata =

Species of flowering plant

Peperomia areolata is a species of epiphyte in the genus Peperomia that is endemic in Peru. It grows on wet tropical biomes. Its conservation status is Threatened.

== Description ==
The type specimen were collected near Balsapuerto, Peru at an altitude of 150–350 meters (490–1,150 ft).

Peperomia areolata is a smooth herb with a rhizomatous root system, producing short, thick stems with few leaves. The leaves are reniform-ovate to rounded-ovate, with a rounded, somewhat acute, or slightly mucronate tip. The base is shortly and openly cordate. Each leaf measures 6 to 8 cm (2.4 to 3.1 in) in length and 7 to 8 cm (2.8 to 3.1 in) in width, with seven prominent nerves. When dried, the leaves display a pale, vein-associated areolate pattern. The petioles are 8 to 12 cm (3.1 to 4.7 in) long. The inflorescence has not been observed.

== Taxonomy and naming ==
It was described in 1936 by William Trelease in Publications of the Field Museum of Natural History, Botanical Series 13, from specimens collected by Ellsworth Paine Killip & Dorothea Eliza Smith. It got its name from the description of the type specimen.

== Distribution and habitat ==
It is endemic in Peru. It grows on a epiphyte environment and is a herb. It grows on wet tropical biomes.

== Conservation ==
This species is assessed as Threatened, in a preliminary report.
