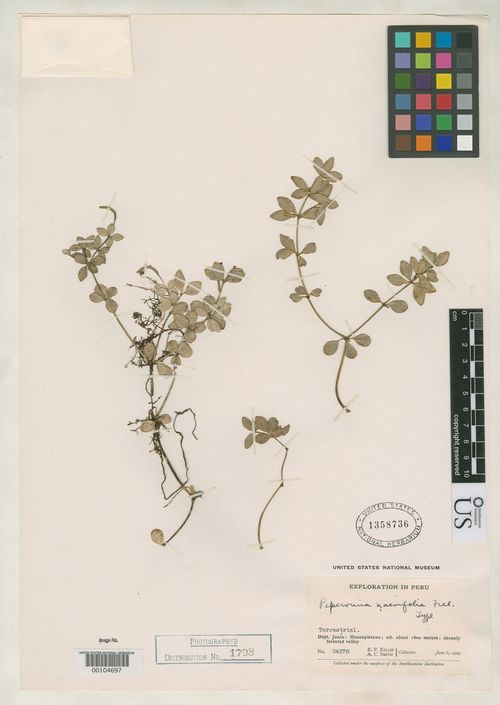

Scientific classification
- Kingdom: Plantae
- Clade: Tracheophytes
- Clade: Angiosperms
- Clade: Magnoliids
- Order: Piperales
- Family: Piperaceae
- Genus: Peperomia
- Species: P. naevifolia

Binomial name
- Peperomia naevifolia Trel.

= Peperomia naevifolia =

Species of plant

Peperomia naevifolia is a species of terrestrial or epiphytic herb in the genus Peperomia that is native to Peru. It grows on wet tropical biomes. Its conservation status is Threatened.

== Description ==
The type specimen were collected at the Huacapistana, Peru at an altitude of 1800 meters above sea level.

Peperomia naevifolia is a somewhat small, stoloniferous, terrestrial herb with more or less branched, erect stems that are angled when dry. The leaves are in whorls of 3–4 at the nodes. They are lanceolate-elliptic to somewhat obovate, obtuse, with an acute base, measuring 10–12 mm long and 5–10 mm wide. The underside is granular and sprinkled with papillae tipped with bristle-like hairs. The leaves are obscurely about 3-nerved. The petiole is 1–2 mm long. The (apparently terminal) spikes are 20 mm long and 1 mm thick, with a peduncle about the same length. The rachis is velvety.

== Taxonomy and naming ==
It was described in 1936 by William Trelease in Publications of the Field Museum of Natural History, Botanical Series 13, from specimens collected by Ellsworth Paine Killip & Albert Charles Smith.

The epithet is derived from the Latin naevus and folia, referring to the spotted or granular appearance of the leaf undersurface with its distinctive papillae.

== Distribution and habitat ==
It is native to Peru. It grows as a terrestrial or epiphytic herb. It grows on wet tropical biomes.

== Conservation ==
This species is assessed as Threatened, in a preliminary report.
