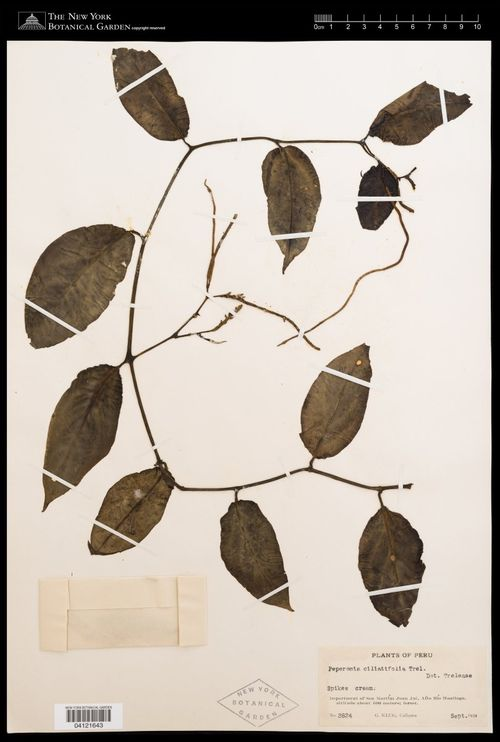

Scientific classification
- Kingdom: Plantae
- Clade: Tracheophytes
- Clade: Angiosperms
- Clade: Magnoliids
- Order: Piperales
- Family: Piperaceae
- Genus: Peperomia
- Species: P. ciliatifolia

Binomial name
- Peperomia ciliatifolia Trel.

= Peperomia ciliatifolia =

Species of flowering plant

Peperomia ciliatifolia is a species of epiphyte in the genus Peperomia that is endemic in Peru. It grows on wet tropical biomes. Its conservation status is Threatened.

== Description ==
The type specimen were collected near Balsapuerto, Peru, at an altitude of 150–350 meters (490–1,150 ft).

Peperomia ciliatifolia is a pendulous, tree-dwelling herb that is mostly glabrous except for its leaves, which are sparsely pilose and have a distinctive, stiff ciliate margin. The slender stem is about 2 mm thick. The alternate leaves are elliptic, with an acutely acuminate tip and a rounded to somewhat acute base. They are large, reaching 11 cm (4.3 in) in length and 5 cm in width, with a few pairs of pinnate nerves below the middle. When dry, the leaves are thin and translucent. The petiole is barely 10 mm long. The spikes are sympodial, borne in pairs, slender, and up to 150 mm (5.9 in) long, with a peduncle scarcely 5 mm long. The berries are oblong to somewhat conical, obliquely truncated by the apical stigma, which is borne on a scutellum.

== Taxonomy and naming ==
It was described in 1936 by William Trelease in Publications of the Field Museum of Natural History, Botanical Series 13, from specimens collected by Ellsworth Paine Killip and Dorothea Eliza Smith. It got its name from the description of the type specimen.

== Subtaxa ==
Following subtaxa are accepted.

- Peperomia ciliatifolia var. eciliatifolia Trel.
- Peperomia ciliatifolia var. iquitosana Trel.
- Peperomia ciliatifolia var. santarosana Trel.

== Distribution and habitat ==
It is endemic in Peru. It grows on a epiphyte environment and is a herb. It grows on wet tropical biomes.

== Conservation ==
This species is assessed as Threatened, in a preliminary report.
