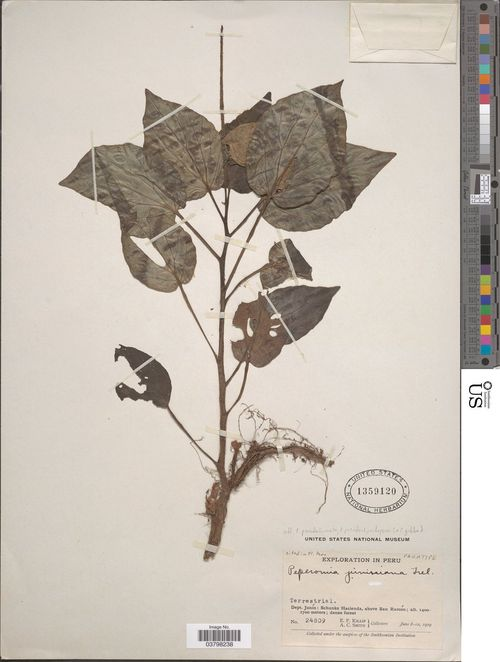

Scientific classification
- Kingdom: Plantae
- Clade: Tracheophytes
- Clade: Angiosperms
- Clade: Magnoliids
- Order: Piperales
- Family: Piperaceae
- Genus: Peperomia
- Species: P. curticaulis

Binomial name
- Peperomia curticaulis Trel.

= Peperomia curticaulis =

Species of flowering plant

Peperomia curticaulis is a species of epiphyte in the genus Peperomia that is endemic in Peru. It grows on wet tropical biomes. Its conservation status is Threatened.

== Description ==
The type specimen were collected near Río Pichis, Peru, at an altitude of 30 meters (98 ft).

Peperomia curticaulis is a glabrous herb with a short, thick stem bearing few leaves. The alternate leaves are broadly ovate, obtuse, with a rounded or shortly cordate base, measuring 7–10 cm (2.8–3.9 in) long and 7–9 cm (2.8–3.5 in) wide. They are 7-nerved, with both the midrib and lateral nerves branching. The petiole is 7 cm long. The terminal spikes are 120 mm (4.7 in) long and 3 mm thick, with somewhat spaced flowers, and are borne on a peduncle 1–2 cm long. The ovary is ovoid, somewhat mucronate, with an oblique stigma.

== Taxonomy and naming ==
It was described in 1936 by William Trelease in Publications of the Field Museum of Natural History, Botanical Series 13, from specimens collected by Ellsworth Paine Killip and Dorothea Eliza Smith.

== Distribution and habitat ==
It is endemic in Peru. It grows on a epiphyte environment and is a herb. It grows on wet tropical biomes. It got its epithet from the Latin curtus + caulis, referring to the plant's characteristic short and thick stem that distinguish this species.

== Conservation ==
This species is assessed as Threatened, in a preliminary report.
