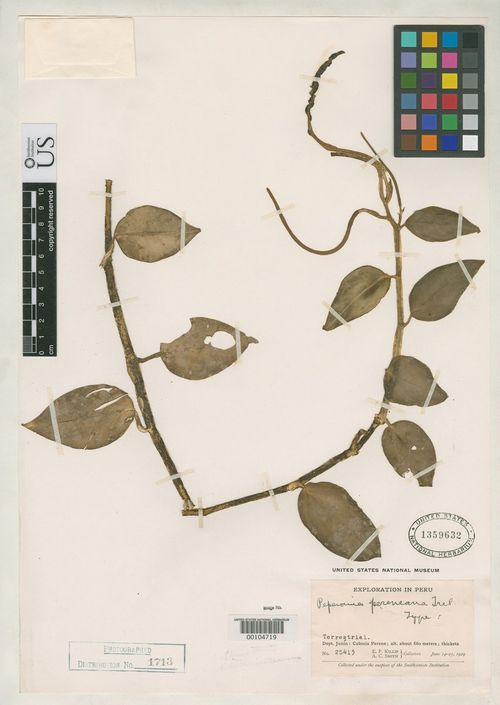

Scientific classification
- Kingdom: Plantae
- Clade: Tracheophytes
- Clade: Angiosperms
- Clade: Magnoliids
- Order: Piperales
- Family: Piperaceae
- Genus: Peperomia
- Species: P. pereneana

Binomial name
- Peperomia pereneana Trel.

= Peperomia pereneana =

Species of plant

Peperomia pereneana is a species of terrestrial or epiphytic herb in the genus Peperomia that is native to Peru. It grows on wet tropical biomes. Its conservation status is Threatened.

== Description ==
The type specimen were collected at Colonia Perené, Peru at an altitude of 680 meters above sea level.

Peperomia pereneana is a very succulent, procumbent, terrestrial herb with a stem 3–5 mm thick, bearing more or less sparse, transient, soft pubescence. The alternate leaves are ovate, acuminate, with a rounded or obscurely cordulate base, measuring 4.5–6 cm long and 2.5–3.5 cm wide. They have obscure pinnate venation and, when dry, are leathery, opaque, and yellowish on the underside. The petiole is 1 cm long. The spikes are terminal and sympodial, solitary or paired, terminating long-bracteate branchlets, and are small when young.

== Taxonomy and naming ==
It was described in 1936 by William Trelease in Publications of the Field Museum of Natural History, Botanical Series 13, from specimens collected by Ellsworth Paine Killip & Albert Charles Smith.

The epithet pereneana is derived from the type locality.

== Distribution and habitat ==
It is native to Peru. It grows as a terrestrial or epiphytic herb. It grows on wet tropical biomes.

== Conservation ==
This species is assessed as Threatened, in a preliminary report.
