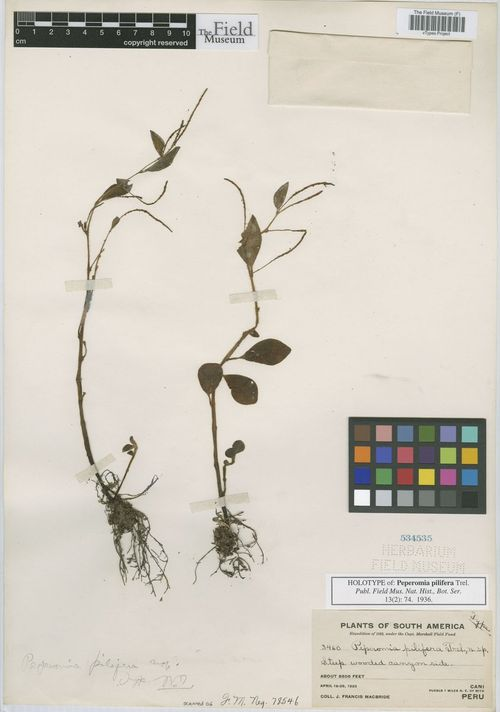

Scientific classification
- Kingdom: Plantae
- Clade: Tracheophytes
- Clade: Angiosperms
- Clade: Magnoliids
- Order: Piperales
- Family: Piperaceae
- Genus: Peperomia
- Species: P. pilifera

Binomial name
- Peperomia pilifera Trel.

= Peperomia pilifera =

Species of plant

Peperomia pilifera is a species of terrestrial or epiphytic herb in the genus Peperomia that is native to Peru. It grows on wet tropical biomes. Its conservation status is Threatened.

== Description ==
The type specimen were collected at Pichis Trail, Peru at an altitude of 1700-1900 meters above sea level.

Peperomia pilifera is a medium-sized, simple, suberect herb with a stem 1–2 mm thick, more or less loosely villous. The alternate leaves are obovate below and sublanceolate above, somewhat acute at both ends, measuring 15–30 mm long and 6–15 mm wide, minutely pubescent, and 3–5-nerved. The loosely pilose petiole is 3–10 mm long. The terminal and axillary spikes are filiform, 20–30 mm long, with a very slender, somewhat villous peduncle about 10 mm long. The berries are rounded-ovoid, mucronate, with a subapical stigma.

== Taxonomy and naming ==
It was described in 1936 by William Trelease in Publications of the Field Museum of Natural History, Botanical Series 13, from specimens collected by Ellsworth Paine Killip & Albert Charles Smith.

The epithet is derived from the Latin pilus and fero, meaning "hair-bearing," referring to the loosely villous indumentum covering the stems, leaves, and peduncles.

== Distribution and habitat ==
It is native to Peru. It grows as a terrestrial or epiphytic herb. It grows on wet tropical biomes.

== Conservation ==
This species is assessed as Threatened, in a preliminary report.
