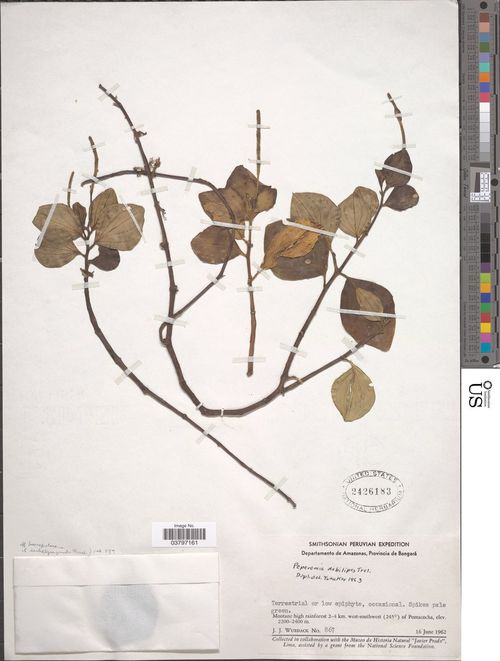

Scientific classification
- Kingdom: Plantae
- Clade: Tracheophytes
- Clade: Angiosperms
- Clade: Magnoliids
- Order: Piperales
- Family: Piperaceae
- Genus: Peperomia
- Species: P. debilipes

Binomial name
- Peperomia debilipes Trel.

= Peperomia debilipes =

Species of flowering plant

Peperomia debilipes is a species of epiphyte in the genus Peperomia that is endemic in Peru. It grows on wet tropical biomes. Its conservation status is Threatened.

== Description ==
The type specimen were collected near Yapas, Peru, at an altitude of 1,350–1,600 meters (4,430–5,250 ft).

Peperomia debilipes is a small, epiphytic, rhizomatous-ascending, glabrous plant with a stem 2–3 mm thick. The alternate leaves are oblanceolate-obovate, obtuse, with a cuneate base, measuring 2–3 cm long and 1–2 cm wide. They are 5-nerved, drying to an opaque olive-green, and are described as having red veins on the underside when living. The very slender petiole is 10–15 mm long. The terminal spikes are 45 mm long and 3 mm thick, with short pseudopedicels, and are borne on a filiform peduncle 2 cm long.

== Taxonomy and naming ==
It was described in 1936 by William Trelease in Publications of the Field Museum of Natural History, Botanical Series 13, from specimens collected by Ellsworth Paine Killip & Dorothea Eliza Smith. It got its epithet from the Latin wikt:debilis + wikt:pes, referring to the very slender, delicate petioles and peduncles.

== Subtaxa ==
Following subtaxa are accepted.

- Peperomia debilipes var. dimorpha Trel.

== Distribution and habitat ==
It is endemic in Peru. It grows on a epiphyte environment and is a herb. It grows on wet tropical biomes.

== Conservation ==
This species is assessed as Threatened, in a preliminary report.
