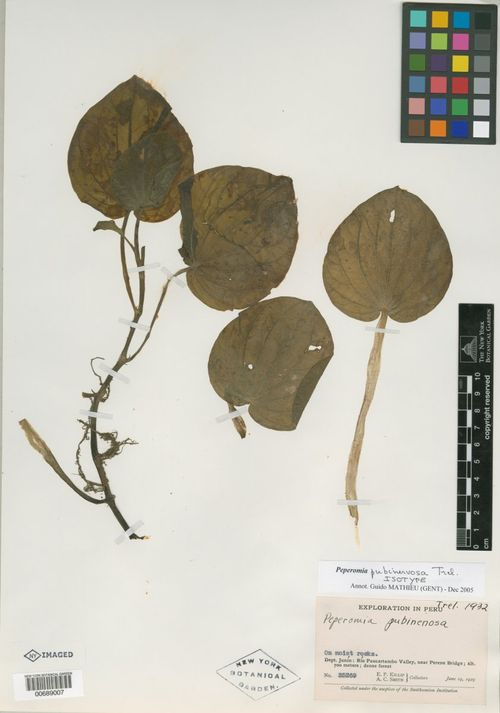

Scientific classification
- Kingdom: Plantae
- Clade: Tracheophytes
- Clade: Angiosperms
- Clade: Magnoliids
- Order: Piperales
- Family: Piperaceae
- Genus: Peperomia
- Species: P. pubinervosa

Binomial name
- Peperomia pubinervosa Trel.

= Peperomia pubinervosa =

Species of plant

Peperomia pubinervosa is a species of terrestrial or epiphytic herb in the genus Peperomia that is native to Peru. It grows on wet tropical biomes. Its conservation status is Threatened.

== Description ==
The type specimen were collected at Río Paucartambo Valley, Peru at an altitude of 700 meters above sea level.

Peperomia pubinervosa is a creeping herb that is velvety throughout. The stem is 3 mm thick with rather short internodes. The leaves are orbicular, abruptly and very shortly acuminate, with a cordate base with a closed sinus, measuring 9 mm long and 8 mm wide. They are palmately 9–11-nerved and, when dry, are thin and green. The petiole is 3–12 cm long. The inflorescence was not seen on the type specimen.

== Taxonomy and naming ==
It was described in 1936 by William Trelease in Publications of the Field Museum of Natural History, Botanical Series 13, from specimens collected by Ellsworth Paine Killip & Albert Charles Smith.

The epithet combines the Latin pubis and nervosa, meaning "with hairy veins," referring to the velvety pubescence covering the leaf nerves.

== Distribution and habitat ==
It is native to Peru. It grows as a terrestrial or epiphytic herb. It grows on wet tropical biomes.

== Conservation ==
This species is assessed as Threatened, in a preliminary report.
