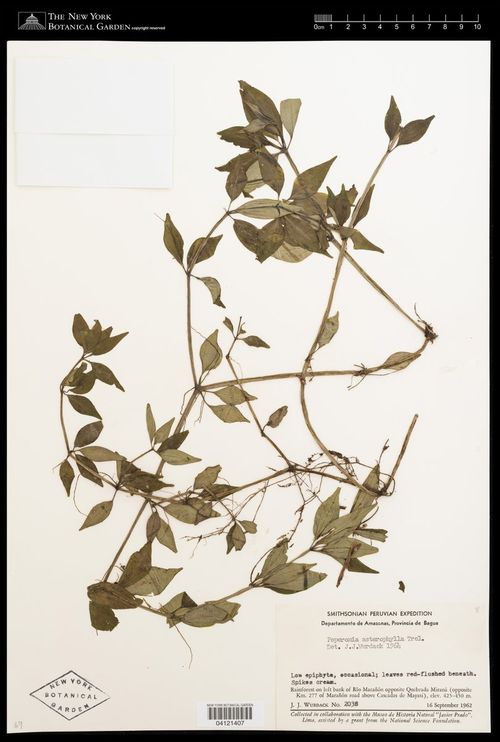

Scientific classification
- Kingdom: Plantae
- Clade: Tracheophytes
- Clade: Angiosperms
- Clade: Magnoliids
- Order: Piperales
- Family: Piperaceae
- Genus: Peperomia
- Species: P. asterophylla

Binomial name
- Peperomia asterophylla Trel.

= Peperomia asterophylla =

Species of flowering plant

Peperomia asterophylla is a species of epiphyte in the genus Peperomia that is endemic in Peru. It grows on wet tropical biomes. Its conservation status is Threatened.

== Description ==
The type specimen were collected near Santa Rosa, Peru at an altitude of 135 meters (443 ft).

Peperomia asterophylla is a medium-sized, stoloniferous herb with a suberect, tufted growth habit. Its stems are 2 to 3 mm thick and velvety at the nodes. The leaves are arranged in whorls of three to five at each node, elliptical in shape with a bluntly pointed tip and an acute base. They measure 2 to 3 cm (0.8 to 1.2 in) in length and 1.5 to 2.5 cm (0.6 to 1.0 in) in width, with three obscure nerves. When dried, the leaves are dull and minutely wrinkled, smooth or nearly so. The petioles are 3 to 4 mm long and brown-velvety. The flower spikes are axillary and terminal, 40 to 80 mm long and 2 mm thick, borne on a nearly smooth peduncle 10 to 15 mm (0.4 to 0.6 in) long. The floral bracts are rounded and peltate.

== Taxonomy and naming ==
It was described in 1936 by William Trelease in Publications of the Field Museum of Natural History, Botanical Series 13, from specimens collected by Ellsworth Paine Killip & Dorothea Eliza Smith. It got its name from the description of the type specimen.

== Distribution and habitat ==
It is endemic in Peru. It grows on a epiphyte environment and is a herb. It grows on wet tropical biomes.

== Conservation ==
This species is assessed as Threatened, in a preliminary report.
