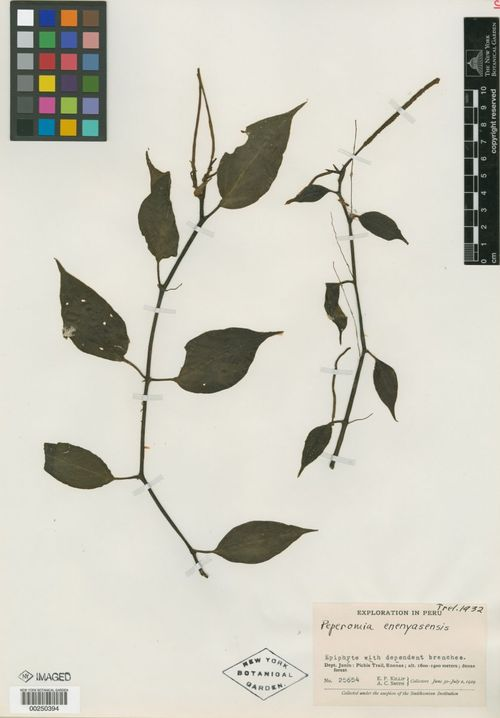

Scientific classification
- Kingdom: Plantae
- Clade: Tracheophytes
- Clade: Angiosperms
- Clade: Magnoliids
- Order: Piperales
- Family: Piperaceae
- Genus: Peperomia
- Species: P. enenyasensis

Binomial name
- Peperomia enenyasensis Trel.

= Peperomia enenyasensis =

Species of flowering plant

Peperomia enenyasensis is a species of epiphyte in the genus Peperomia that is endemic in Peru. It grows on wet tropical biomes. Its conservation status is Threatened.

== Description ==
The type specimen were collected near Eneñas, Peru, at an altitude of 1,600–1,900 meters (5,200–6,200 ft).

Peperomia enenyasensis is a rather large, slender, pendulous, epiphytic herb, minutely crisp-pubescent throughout, though older stems and upper leaf surfaces may become glabrescent. The alternate leaves are somewhat ovate, acutely acuminate, with an acute to somewhat obtuse base, measuring 7–10 cm (2.8–3.9 in) long and 4–5 cm wide. They are pinnately nerved and, when dry, are thin and brown. The petiole is 1.5–4 cm long. The spikes are borne in pairs, terminating a short, slender, bracteate sympodial branch. Mature spikes reach 150 mm (5.9 in) in length and, when in fruit, are 8 mm in diameter. The peduncle is 2 cm long. The pale, narrowly oblong berries are obliquely truncated by an acute shield bearing the central stigma.

== Taxonomy and naming ==
It was described in 1936 by William Trelease in Publications of the Field Museum of Natural History, Botanical Series 13, from specimens collected by Ellsworth Paine Killip and Dorothea Eliza Smith. It got its epithet from the type locality.

== Distribution and habitat ==
It is endemic in Peru. It grows on a epiphyte environment and is a herb. It grows on wet tropical biomes.

== Conservation ==
This species is assessed as Threatened, in a preliminary report.
