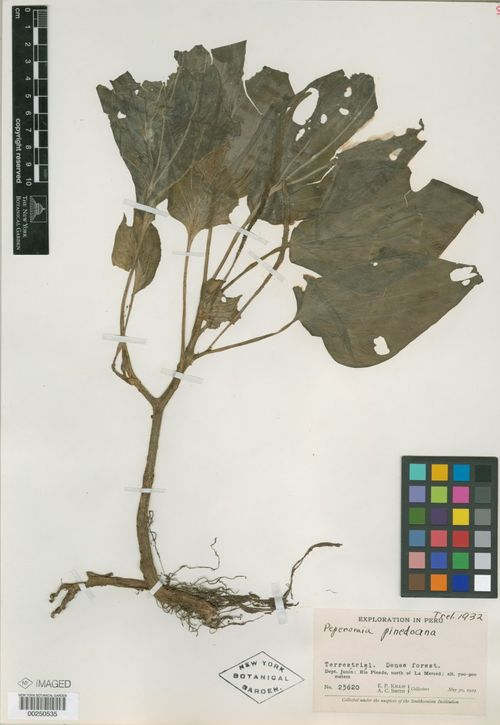

Scientific classification
- Kingdom: Plantae
- Clade: Tracheophytes
- Clade: Angiosperms
- Clade: Magnoliids
- Order: Piperales
- Family: Piperaceae
- Genus: Peperomia
- Species: P. pinedoana

Binomial name
- Peperomia pinedoana Trel.

= Peperomia pinedoana =

Species of plant

Peperomia pinedoana is a species of terrestrial or epiphytic herb in the genus Peperomia that is native to Peru. It grows on wet tropical biomes. Its conservation status is Threatened.

== Description ==
The type specimen were collected at Río Pinedo, Peru at an altitude of 700-900 meters above sea level.

Peperomia pinedoana is a rather large, glabrous herb with a stem 2–5 mm thick. The alternate leaves are broadly ovate, acuminate, with a subtruncate-rounded base that abruptly decurrent onto the petiole. They measure 10–14 cm long and 7–10 cm wide, are palmately 9-nerved (with the lateral nerves branched only), and when dry are thin and green. The petiole is 5–11 cm long. The sympodial spikes are 50 mm long and 3 mm thick, with a slender peduncle 4 cm long. The ovary is rounded with a subapical stigma.

== Taxonomy and naming ==
It was described in 1936 by William Trelease in Publications of the Field Museum of Natural History, Botanical Series 13, from specimens collected by Ellsworth Paine Killip & Albert Charles Smith.

The epithet is derived from the type locality.

== Distribution and habitat ==
It is native to Peru. It grows as a terrestrial or epiphytic herb. It grows on wet tropical biomes.

== Conservation ==
This species has been assessed as threatened in a preliminary report.
