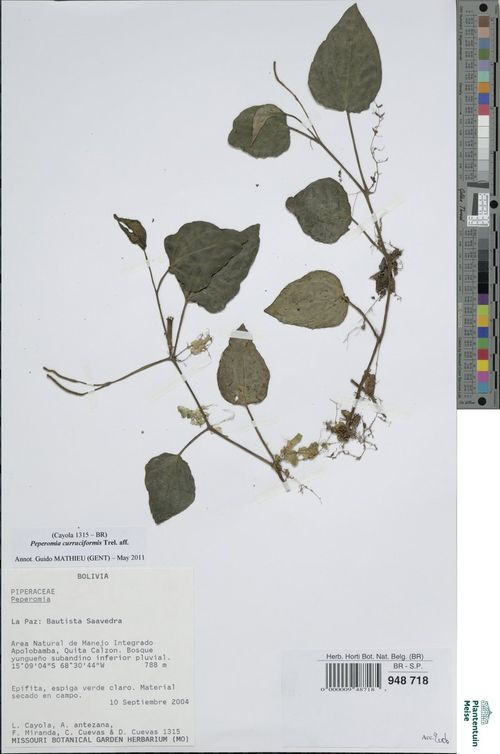

Scientific classification
- Kingdom: Plantae
- Clade: Tracheophytes
- Clade: Angiosperms
- Clade: Magnoliids
- Order: Piperales
- Family: Piperaceae
- Genus: Peperomia
- Species: P. curruciformis

Binomial name
- Peperomia curruciformis Trel.

Synonyms
- Peperomia currucaeformis Trel.

= Peperomia curruciformis =

Species of flowering plant

Peperomia curruciformis is a species of epiphyte in the genus Peperomia that is endemic in Peru. It grows on wet tropical biomes. Its conservation status is Threatened.

== Description ==
The type specimen were collected near La Merced, Peru, at an altitude of 1,400–1,700 meters (4,600–5,600 ft).

Peperomia curruciformis is a terrestrial, creeping, glabrous herb. The leaves are broadly ovate to deltoid-ovate, obtuse, with a truncate-cordate base, measuring 5–6 cm long and 4–6 cm wide. They are 7-nerved, with the inner lateral nerves confluent with the midrib. When dry, they are opaque, olive-green, and granular in texture. The petiole is 2–3 cm long. The spikes are borne in pairs at the apex of a 4 cm long, divergent sympodial stem, curving upward. They are 60–70 mm long and 3 mm thick, with a peduncle 15–20 mm long. The berries are ellipsoid and beaked, with the stigma inserted at the base of the beak.

== Taxonomy and naming ==
It was described in 1936 by William Trelease in Publications of the Field Museum of Natural History, Botanical Series 13, from specimens collected by Ellsworth Paine Killip and Dorothea Eliza Smith.

== Distribution and habitat ==
It is endemic in Peru. It grows on a epiphyte environment and is a herb. It grows on wet tropical biomes.

== Conservation ==
This species is assessed as Threatened, in a preliminary report.
