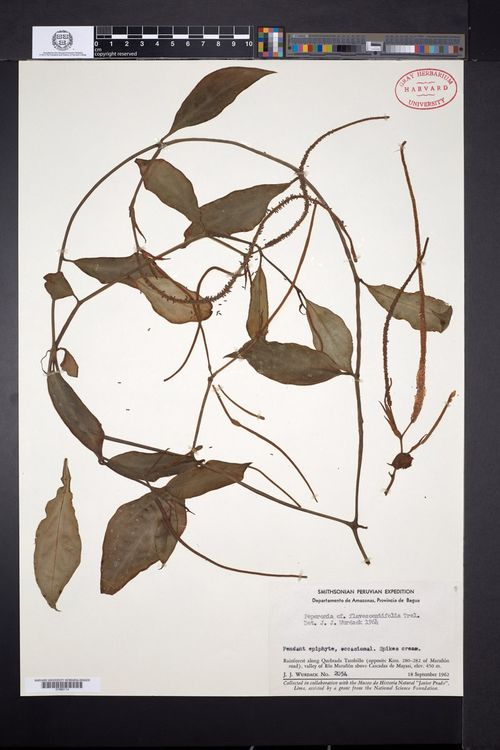

Scientific classification
- Kingdom: Plantae
- Clade: Tracheophytes
- Clade: Angiosperms
- Clade: Magnoliids
- Order: Piperales
- Family: Piperaceae
- Genus: Peperomia
- Species: P. flavescentifolia

Binomial name
- Peperomia flavescentifolia Trel.

= Peperomia flavescentifolia =

Species of flowering plant

Peperomia flavescentifolia is a species of epiphyte in the genus Peperomia that is endemic in Peru. It grows on wet tropical biomes. Its conservation status is Threatened.

== Description ==
The type specimen were collected near Iquitos, Peru, at an altitude of 100 meters (330 ft).

Peperomia flavescentifolia is a slender, pendulous, epiphytic herb that is essentially glabrous. The leaves are elliptic, somewhat acuminate, with a somewhat acute base, measuring 3–5 cm long and 2–3 cm wide. They have obscure pinnate venation, and the underside is yellowish and granular in texture. When dry, the leaves are very leathery. The petiole is scarcely 5 mm long. The spikes are borne in pairs at the apex of a short sympodial branchlet. They are 100–150 mm (3.9–5.9 in) long and slender, with a peduncle 15 mm long. The pale berries are conical-oblong, acutely and obliquely truncated, with the stigma inserted on a small shield.

== Taxonomy and naming ==
It was described in 1936 by William Trelease in Publications of the Field Museum of Natural History, Botanical Series 13, from specimens collected by Ellsworth Paine Killip and Dorothea Eliza Smith. It got its epithet from the Latin flavescens and folia, referring to the yellowish underside of the leaves.

== Distribution and habitat ==
It is endemic in Peru. It grows on a epiphyte environment and is a herb. It grows on wet tropical biomes.

== Conservation ==
This species is assessed as Threatened, in a preliminary report.
