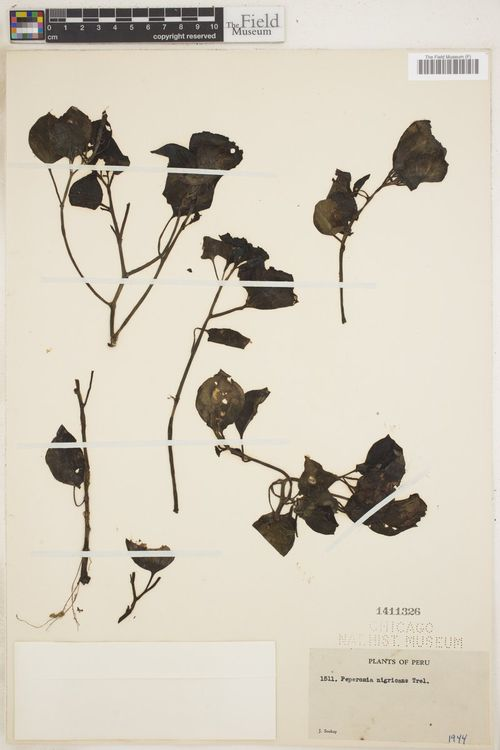

Scientific classification
- Kingdom: Plantae
- Clade: Tracheophytes
- Clade: Angiosperms
- Clade: Magnoliids
- Order: Piperales
- Family: Piperaceae
- Genus: Peperomia
- Species: P. nigricans

Binomial name
- Peperomia nigricans Trel.

= Peperomia nigricans =

Species of plant

Peperomia nigricans is a species of terrestrial or epiphytic herb in the genus Peperomia that is native to Peru. It grows on wet tropical biomes. Its conservation status is threatened.

== Description ==
The type specimen were collected at La Merced, Peru at an altitude of 700 meters above sea level.

Peperomia nigricans is a medium-sized, more or less branched, erect herb with a stem 3–4 mm thick covered in crisp pubescence. The alternate leaves are round-ovate, abruptly somewhat acute at both ends, measuring 3.5–4 cm long and 3–4 cm wide. They are slenderly 5-nerved, with the midrib obscurely branched, and when dry are thin, opaque, and dark brown. The underside is blackish-granular and crisp-pubescent, especially along the nerves. The crisp-pubescent petiole is 1–3 mm long. The inflorescence was not seen on the type specimen.

== Taxonomy and naming ==
It was described in 1936 by William Trelease in Publications of the Field Museum of Natural History, Botanical Series 13, from specimens collected by Ellsworth Paine Killip & Albert Charles Smith.

The epithet nigricans is Latin for "becoming black," referring to the dark brown to blackish coloration of the dried leaves, particularly the granular undersides.

== Distribution and habitat ==
It is native to Peru. It grows as a terrestrial or epiphytic herb. It grows on wet tropical biomes.

== Conservation ==
This species has been assessed as threatened in a preliminary report.
