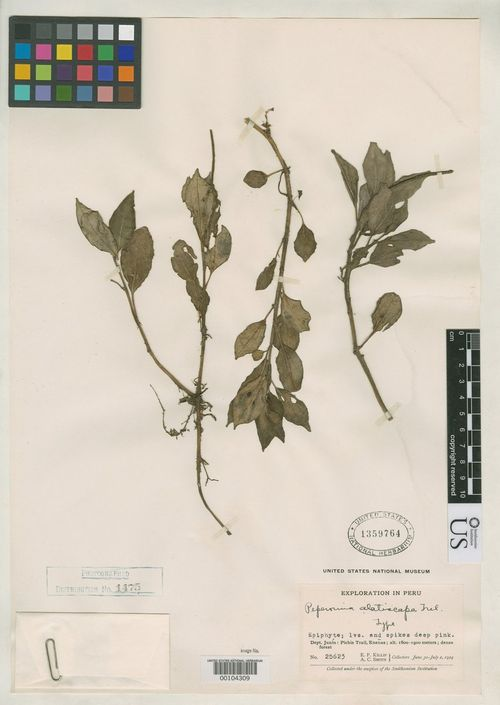

Scientific classification
- Kingdom: Plantae
- Clade: Tracheophytes
- Clade: Angiosperms
- Clade: Magnoliids
- Order: Piperales
- Family: Piperaceae
- Genus: Peperomia
- Species: P. alatiscapa

Binomial name
- Peperomia alatiscapa Trel.

= Peperomia alatiscapa =

Species of flowering plant

Peperomia alatiscapa is a species of epiphyte in the genus Peperomia that is endemic in Peru. It grows on wet tropical biomes. Its conservation status is Threatened.

== Description ==
The type specimen were collected near Eneñas, Peru, at an altitude of 1,600–1,900 meters (5,200–6,200 ft).

Peperomia alatiscapa is a medium-sized, nearly unbranched epiphyte with a smooth, hairless surface. Its leaves are alternate, though the uppermost ones may appear in whorls of three. The leaf blades are elliptic to slightly obovate in shape, with a bluntly pointed tip and a sharp, acute base. Each leaf measures 2.5–4 cm (1.0–1.6 in) in length and 1.5–2.5 cm (0.6–1.0 in) in width, featuring three to five nerves, with the midrib showing faint branching. When dried, the leaves take on a dull, olive-green tone, but in life they are a subtle rose color. The petioles are about 10 mm long and extend downward as ridges along the stem. The flower spikes are terminal, reaching 7 cm (2.8 in) in length and 2 mm in thickness, densely packed with flowers. These spikes are borne on a peduncle 10 mm long. The floral bracts are rounded and peltate, shield-shaped with the stalk attached at the center.

== Taxonomy and naming ==
It was described in 1936 by William Trelease in Publications of the Field Museum of Natural History, Botanical Series 13, from specimens collected by Ellsworth Paine Killip & Dorothea Eliza Smith. It got its name from the description of the type specimen.

== Distribution and habitat ==
It is endemic in Peru. It grows on a epiphyte environment and is a herb. It grows on wet tropical biomes.

== Conservation ==
This species is assessed as Threatened, in a preliminary report.
