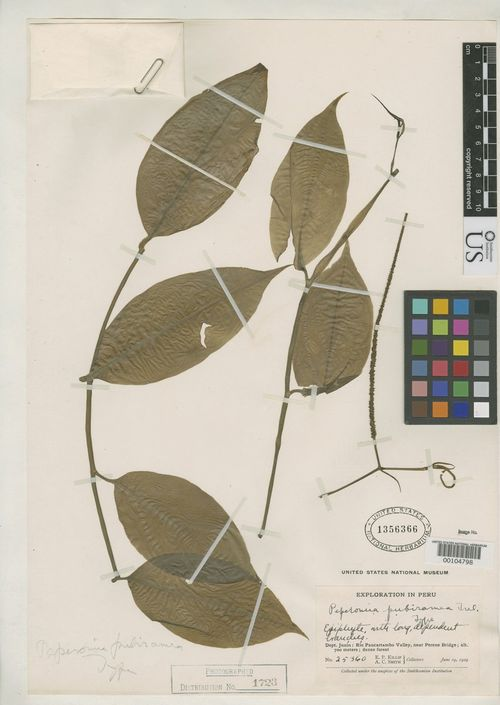

Scientific classification
- Kingdom: Plantae
- Clade: Tracheophytes
- Clade: Angiosperms
- Clade: Magnoliids
- Order: Piperales
- Family: Piperaceae
- Genus: Peperomia
- Species: P. pubiramea

Binomial name
- Peperomia pubiramea Trel.

= Peperomia pubiramea =

Species of plant

Peperomia pubiramea is a species of terrestrial or epiphytic herb in the genus Peperomia that is native to Peru. It grows on wet tropical biomes. Its conservation status is Threatened.

== Description ==
The type specimen were collected at Río Paucartambo Valley, Peru at an altitude of 700 meters above sea level.

Peperomia pubiramea is a rather large, pendulous, epiphytic herb with somewhat slender, long internodes that are microscopically crisp-puberulous. The alternate leaves are elliptic, narrowly acuminate, with a somewhat acute base, measuring 12–15 cm long and 5–6 cm wide. They are pinnately nerved from the lower half, very sparsely minutely pilose beneath, and when dry are thin and pellucid. The petiole is 10–15 mm long. The spikes are borne in pairs, terminating narrowly 2-bracteate sympodial branchlets. They are 150 mm long and 2–3 mm thick, with a 15 mm peduncle. The berries are oblong, acutely and obliquely shielded, with the stigma inserted on the shield.

== Taxonomy and Naming ==
It was described in 1936 by William Trelease in Publications of the Field Museum of Natural History, Botanical Series 13, from specimens collected by Ellsworth Paine Killip & Albert Charles Smith.

The epithet combines The Latin pubis and rameus, meaning "with hairy branches," referring to the minute crisp pubescence on the branchlets and internodes.

== Distribution and Habitat ==
It is native to Peru. It grows as a terrestrial or epiphytic herb. It grows on wet tropical biomes.

== Conservation ==
This species is assessed as Threatened, in a preliminary report.
