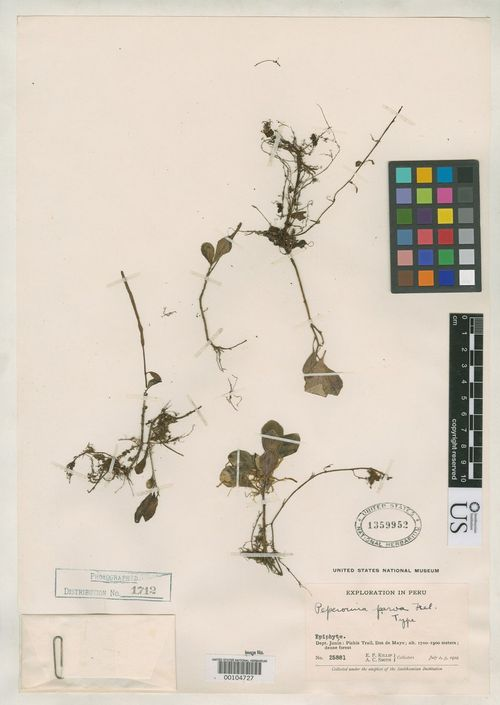

Scientific classification
- Kingdom: Plantae
- Clade: Tracheophytes
- Clade: Angiosperms
- Clade: Magnoliids
- Order: Piperales
- Family: Piperaceae
- Genus: Peperomia
- Species: P. parva

Binomial name
- Peperomia parva Trel.

= Peperomia parva =

Species of plant

Peperomia parva is a species of terrestrial or epiphytic herb in the genus Peperomia that is native to Peru. It grows on wet tropical biomes. Its conservation status has been evaluated as threatened.

== Description ==
The type specimen were collected at Pichis Trail, Peru at an altitude of 1700-1900 meters above sea level.

Peperomia parva is a small, epiphytic, erect, glabrous herb. The alternate leaves are obovate, with a rounded apex and an acute base, measuring 15 mm long and 10–12 mm wide. They are pinnately nerved and, when dry, are leathery and opaque. The petiole is 5 mm long. The terminal spikes are 30 mm long and 2 mm thick, with a peduncle half as long (15 mm).

== Taxonomy and naming ==
It was described in 1936 by William Trelease in Publications of the Field Museum of Natural History, Botanical Series 13, from specimens collected by Ellsworth Paine Killip & Albert Charles Smith.

The epithet is derived from the Latin for "small," directly referring to the diminutive size of this epiphytic species.

== Distribution and habitat ==
It is native to Peru. It grows as a terrestrial or epiphytic herb. It grows on wet tropical biomes.

== Conservation ==
This species has been assessed as threatened in a preliminary report.
