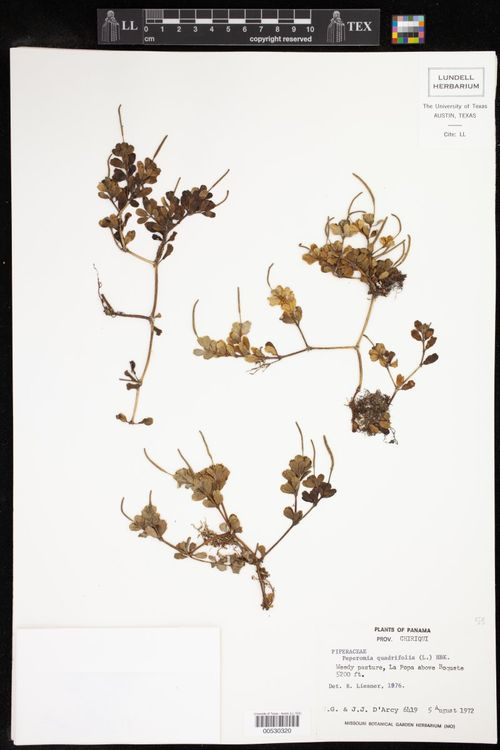

Scientific classification
- Kingdom: Plantae
- Clade: Tracheophytes
- Clade: Angiosperms
- Clade: Magnoliids
- Order: Piperales
- Family: Piperaceae
- Genus: Peperomia
- Species: P. quadratifolia

Binomial name
- Peperomia quadratifolia Trel.

= Peperomia quadratifolia =

Species of plant

Peperomia quadratifolia is a species of terrestrial or epiphytic herb in the genus Peperomia that is native to Peru. It grows on wet tropical biomes. Its conservation status is threatened.

== Description ==
The type specimen were collected at Schunke Hacienda, Peru at an altitude of 1400-1700 meters above sea level

Peperomia quadratifolia is a small, creeping, epiphytic herb that is transiently more or less pilose at the nodes, with a filiform, rooting stem. The leaves are in whorls of about 4 at the nodes. They are rhombic-square, bluntly subacuminate, with an acute base, and are 1-nerved, drying to an opaque green. The terminal spikes are filiform, 40 mm long, with a 20 mm peduncle. The rachis is glabrous with somewhat loosely arranged flowers. The berries are ovoid, pointed, and bear a pseudocupula, with an apical stigma.

== Taxonomy and naming ==
It was described in 1936 by William Trelease in Publications of the Field Museum of Natural History, Botanical Series 13, from specimens collected by Ellsworth Paine Killip & Albert Charles Smith.

The epithet combines the Latin quadratus and folia, referring to the distinctive square or rhombic-quadrate shape of the leaves.

== Distribution and habitat ==
It is native to Peru. It grows as a terrestrial or epiphytic herb. It grows on wet tropical biomes.

== Conservation ==
This species has been assessed as threatened in a preliminary report.
