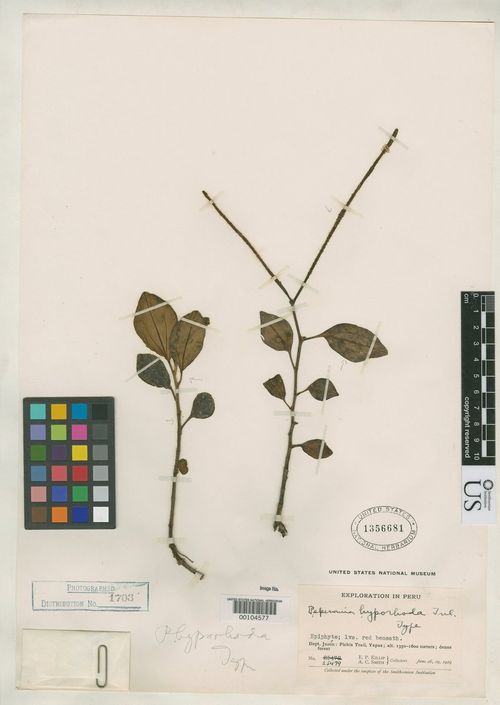

Scientific classification
- Kingdom: Plantae
- Clade: Tracheophytes
- Clade: Angiosperms
- Clade: Magnoliids
- Order: Piperales
- Family: Piperaceae
- Genus: Peperomia
- Species: P. hyporhoda

Binomial name
- Peperomia hyporhoda Trel.

= Peperomia hyporhoda =

Species of epiphyte

Peperomia hyporhoda is a species of epiphyte in the genus Peperomia that is endemic to Peru. It grows on wet tropical biomes. Its conservation status is Threatened.

== Description ==
The type specimen were collected in the Junín region of Peru.

Peperomia hyporhoda is a simple, medium-sized, rhizomatous-ascending herb with a stem 2–3 mm thick, more or less covered in crisp pubescence. The alternate leaves are somewhat elliptic, obtuse or somewhat acuminate, with an acute base, measuring 2.5–4 cm long and 2–3 cm wide. They are 3- or less distinctly 5-nerved, and are granular-punctulate when dry. When live, the underside is red, though it turns brownish upon drying. The crisp-pubescent petiole is about 1 cm long. Two apical spikes are present, each 100 mm long and 3 mm thick, bearing pseudopedicels, and are borne on a peduncle 10–15 mm long.

== Taxonomy and naming ==
It was described in 1936 by William Trelease in Publications of the Field Museum of Natural History, Botanical Series 13, from specimens collected by Ellsworth Paine Killip & Dorothea Eliza Smith. The epithet hyporhoda is derived from the Greek hypo and rhodon, referring to the distinctive red color of the undersides of the living leaves.

== Distribution and habitat ==
It is endemic to Peru. It grows on a terrestrial or epiphyte environment and is a herb. It grows on wet tropical biomes.

== Conservation ==
This species is assessed as Threatened, in a preliminary report.
