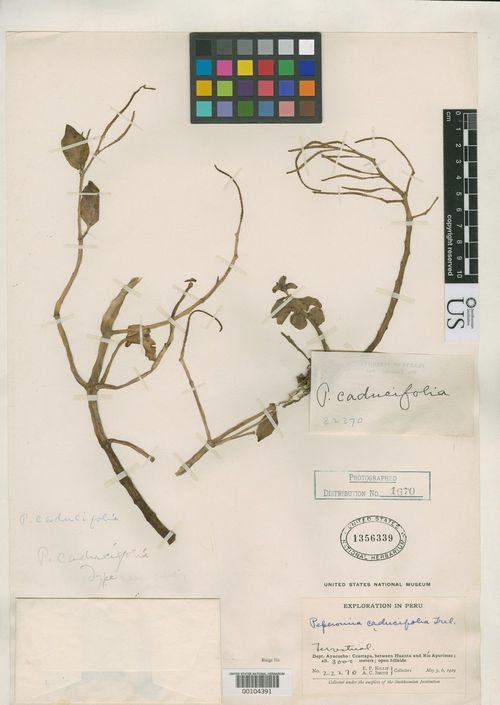

Scientific classification
- Kingdom: Plantae
- Clade: Tracheophytes
- Clade: Angiosperms
- Clade: Magnoliids
- Order: Piperales
- Family: Piperaceae
- Genus: Peperomia
- Species: P. caducifolia

Binomial name
- Peperomia caducifolia Trel.

= Peperomia caducifolia =

Species of flowering plant

Peperomia caducifolia is a species of epiphyte in the genus Peperomia that is endemic in Peru. It grows on wet tropical biomes. Its conservation status is Threatened.

== Description ==
The type specimen were collected near Carrapa, Peru, at an altitude of 3,000 meters (9,800 ft).

Peperomia caducifolia is a tall, creeping then ascending herb with very fleshy, branching stems that are covered in minute, fine hairs. The leaves are alternate and caducous, falling off readily. Leaves on the sterile branches are small and nearly round, while others are elliptic with a bluntly acuminate tip and a somewhat acute base. These larger leaves are about 3 cm long and 1.5–2 cm wide, with the uppermost ones being smaller. The leaves are 3-nerved and minutely puberulous. The petiole is 5–10 mm long and becomes hairless with age. Several spikes arise from terminal and axillary positions. They appear to emerge from bare nodes that form a short, false peduncle. The spikes are about 30 mm long with loosely inserted flowers and are borne on a 5 mm peduncle. The floral bracts are round-peltate.

== Taxonomy and naming ==
It was described in 1936 by William Trelease in Publications of the Field Museum of Natural History, Botanical Series 13, from specimens collected by Ellsworth Paine Killip and Dorothea Eliza Smith. It got its name from the description of the type specimen.

== Distribution and habitat ==
It is endemic in Peru. It grows on a epiphyte environment and is a herb. It grows on wet tropical biomes.

== Conservation ==
This species is assessed as Threatened, in a preliminary report.
