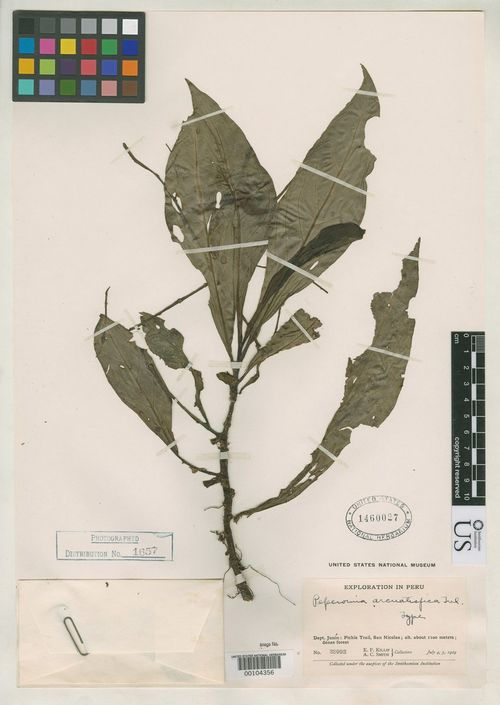

Scientific classification
- Kingdom: Plantae
- Clade: Tracheophytes
- Clade: Angiosperms
- Clade: Magnoliids
- Order: Piperales
- Family: Piperaceae
- Genus: Peperomia
- Species: P. arcuatispica

Binomial name
- Peperomia arcuatispica Trel.

= Peperomia arcuatispica =

Species of flowering plant

Peperomia arctebaccata is a species of epiphyte in the genus Peperomia that is endemic in Peru. It grows on wet tropical biomes. Its conservation status is threatened.

== Description ==
The type specimen were collected near Pichis Trail, Peru at an altitude of 1100 meters.

Peperomia arcuatispica is a rather large, smooth herb that spreads by stolons, with stems up to 5 mm thick. The leaves are alternate, oblanceolate, and acute, with a cuneate base. They measure 16 to 18 cm in length and 6 cm in width, featuring pinnate venation throughout. When dried, the leaves are thin and green. The petioles are 1 cm long and winged by the decurrent leaf blade. The flower spikes are arranged in a panicle that barely exceeds the leaves in length. The panicle bears about three branches, each with one or two curved basal spikes 2 to 4 cm long and several additional spikes at the tip. Individual spikes are 30 mm long and 1 mm thick, borne on nearly nonexistent peduncles. The floral bracts are rounded and peltate.

== Taxonomy and naming ==
It was described in 1936 by William Trelease in Publications of the Field Museum of Natural History, Botanical Series 13, from specimens collected by Ellsworth Paine Killip & Dorothea Eliza Smith. It got its name from the description of the type specimen.

== Distribution and habitat ==
It is endemic in Peru. It grows on a epiphyte environment and is a herb. It grows on wet tropical biomes.

== Conservation ==
This species has been assessed as threatened in a preliminary report.
