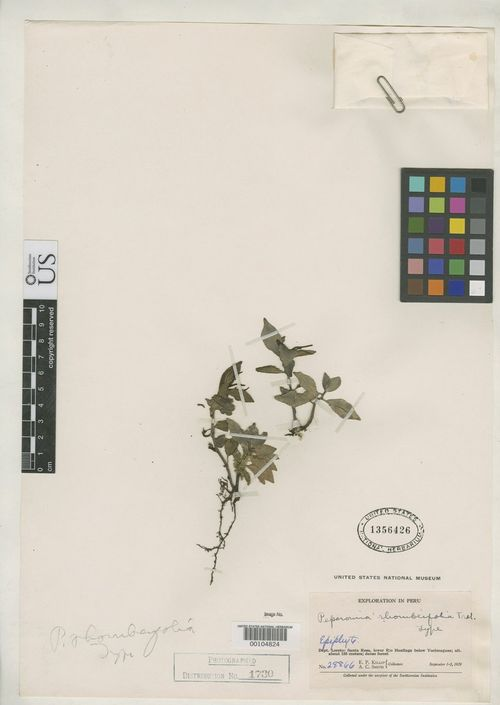

Scientific classification
- Kingdom: Plantae
- Clade: Tracheophytes
- Clade: Angiosperms
- Clade: Magnoliids
- Order: Piperales
- Family: Piperaceae
- Genus: Peperomia
- Species: P. rhombeifolia

Binomial name
- Peperomia rhombeifolia Trel.

= Peperomia rhombeifolia =

Species of epiphyte

Peperomia rhombeifolia is a species of epiphyte in the genus Peperomia that is endemic in Peru. It grows on wet tropical biomes. Its conservation status is Not Threatened.

== Description ==
The type specimen were collected near Santa Rosa, Peru at an altitude of 135 meters.

Peperomia rhombeifolia is a small, rhizomatous, tufted, epiphytic, glabrous herb with minute papillae. The stem is 3 mm thick. The alternate leaves are crowded, rhombic-lanceolate, measuring 2.5 cm long and 1 cm wide, opaque, and obscurely 5-nerved. The petiole is 5 mm long. The axillary spikes turn blackish when dry.

== Taxonomy and naming ==
It was described in 1936 by William Trelease in Publications of the Field Museum of Natural History, Botanical Series 13, from specimens collected by Ellsworth Paine Killip & Albert Charles Smith. The epithet rhombeifolia combines the Latin rhombeus and folia, referring to the distinctive rhombic-lanceolate shape of the leaves.

== Distribution and habitat ==
It is endemic in Peru. It grows on a epiphyte environment and is a herb. It grows on wet tropical biomes.

== Conservation ==
This species is assessed as Not Threatened.
