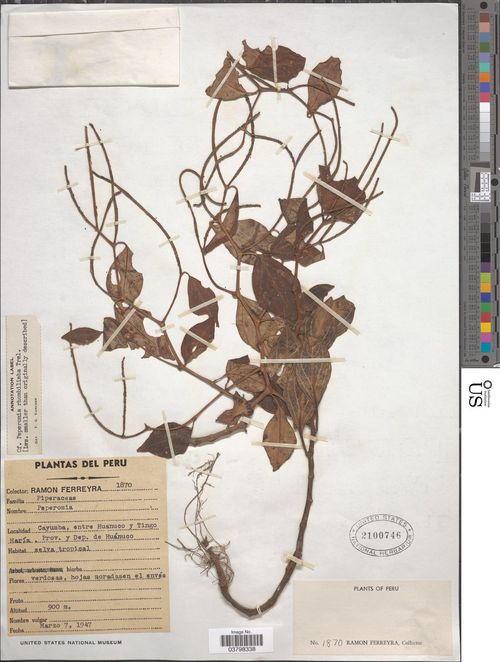

Scientific classification
- Kingdom: Plantae
- Clade: Tracheophytes
- Clade: Angiosperms
- Clade: Magnoliids
- Order: Piperales
- Family: Piperaceae
- Genus: Peperomia
- Species: P. rhombilimba

Binomial name
- Peperomia rhombilimba Trel.

= Peperomia rhombilimba =

Species of flowering plant

Peperomia rhombilimba is a species of epiphyte in the genus Peperomia that is endemic in Peru. It grows on wet tropical biomes. Its conservation status is Threatened.

== Description ==
The type specimen were collected near Aina, Peru at an altitude of 700-1000 meters.

Peperomia rhombilimba is a medium-sized, ascending herb with a stem 2–3 mm thick, sparsely covered in crisp pubescence. The alternate leaves are rhombic (or lower leaves round-obovate), acute at both ends, measuring 5–6 cm long and 3.5 cm wide. They are somewhat pinnately 7-nerved, with crisp pubescence along the midrib. The slender petiole is 5–10 mm long. The terminal spikes are filiform, nearly 150 mm long, with pseudopedicels, and are borne on a peduncle 15–20 mm long. The berries are rounded and mucronate, with the stigma inserted obliquely in the mucro.

== Taxonomy and naming ==
It was described in 1936 by William Trelease in Publications of the Field Museum of Natural History, Botanical Series 13, from specimens collected by Ellsworth Paine Killip & Albert Charles Smith. The epithet rhombilimba combines rhombus (rhombic) and limbus (blade), referring to the rhombic shape of the leaf blade.

== Distribution and habitat ==
It is endemic in Peru. It grows on a epiphyte environment and is a herb. It grows on wet tropical biomes.

== Conservation ==
Its conservation status is Threatened.
