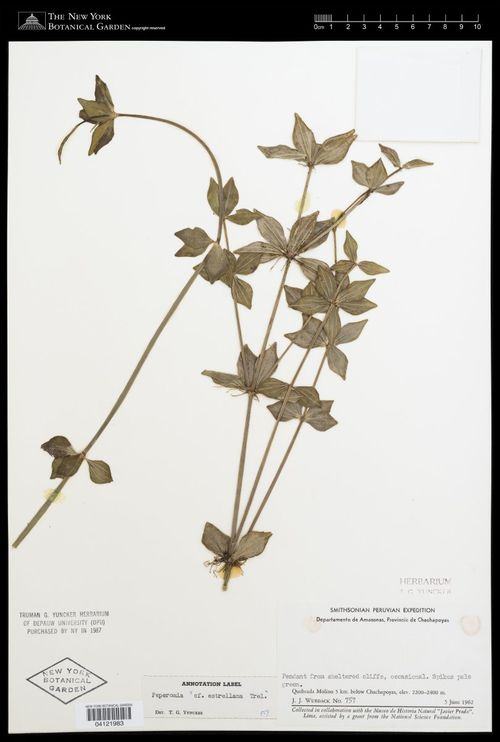

Scientific classification
- Kingdom: Plantae
- Clade: Tracheophytes
- Clade: Angiosperms
- Clade: Magnoliids
- Order: Piperales
- Family: Piperaceae
- Genus: Peperomia
- Species: P. estrellana

Binomial name
- Peperomia estrellana Trel.

= Peperomia estrellana =

Species of flowering plant

Peperomia estrellana is a species of epiphyte in the genus Peperomia that is endemic in Peru. It grows on wet tropical biomes. Its conservation status is Threatened.

== Description ==
The type specimen were collected near Estrella, Peru, at an altitude of 500 meters (1,600 ft).

Peperomia estrellana is a somewhat small, glabrous, rhizomatous, epiphytic herb with erect, leafy branches. The leaves are in whorls of 3–5 at the nodes. Leaves on the stolons are subspathulate, slightly emarginate, with a cuneate base, an opaque ashy-green color, and obscure 3-nerved venation. The petiole is 2 mm long. The terminal spikes are 20 mm long and 2 mm thick, borne on a 15 mm peduncle. The berries are ovoid, pointed, and bear a small cup-like structure, with an apical stigma.

== Taxonomy and naming ==
It was described in 1936 by William Trelease in Publications of the Field Museum of Natural History, Botanical Series 13, from specimens collected by Ellsworth Paine Killip & Dorothea Eliza Smith. It got its epithet from the type locality.

== Distribution and habitat ==
It is endemic in Peru. It grows on a epiphyte environment and is a herb. It grows on wet tropical biomes.

== Conservation ==
This species is assessed as Threatened, in a preliminary report.
