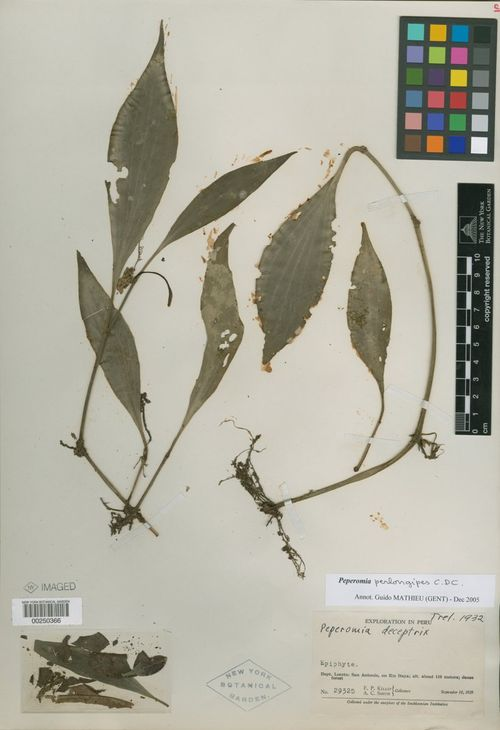

Scientific classification
- Kingdom: Plantae
- Clade: Tracheophytes
- Clade: Angiosperms
- Clade: Magnoliids
- Order: Piperales
- Family: Piperaceae
- Genus: Peperomia
- Species: P. deceptrix

Binomial name
- Peperomia deceptrix Trel.

= Peperomia deceptrix =

Species of flowering plant

Peperomia deceptrix is a species of epiphyte in the genus Peperomia that is endemic in Peru. It grows on wet tropical biomes. Its conservation status is Threatened.

== Description ==
The type specimen were collected near San Antonio, Peru, at an altitude of 110 meters (360 ft).

Peperomia deceptrix is a glabrous, epiphytic plant, apparently creeping and rooting, flowering from nodes with 4 leaves. The leaves are oblanceolate, acute, with a cuneate base, measuring 11–12 cm (4.3–4.7 in) long and 3–3.5 cm (1.2–1.4 in) wide. They are 7–9-nerved and, when dry, are opaque green and somewhat thinly papery in texture. The petiole is 4–9 cm (1.6–3.5 in) long. The spikes appear to be solitary at the apex of a 5–6 cm (2.0–2.4 in) long branchlet. Young spikes are 40 mm (1.6 in) long and 1 mm thick, borne on a filiform peduncle 2 cm (0.8 in) long.

== Taxonomy and naming ==
It was described in 1936 by William Trelease in Publications of the Field Museum of Natural History, Botanical Series 13, from specimens collected by Ellsworth Paine Killip & Dorothea Eliza Smith. It got its epithet from the Latin wikt:decipio, referring to the plant's appearance that can be misleading or easily confused with another species.

== Distribution and habitat ==
It is endemic in Peru. It grows on a epiphyte environment and is a herb. It grows on wet tropical biomes.

== Conservation ==
This species is assessed as Threatened, in a preliminary report.
