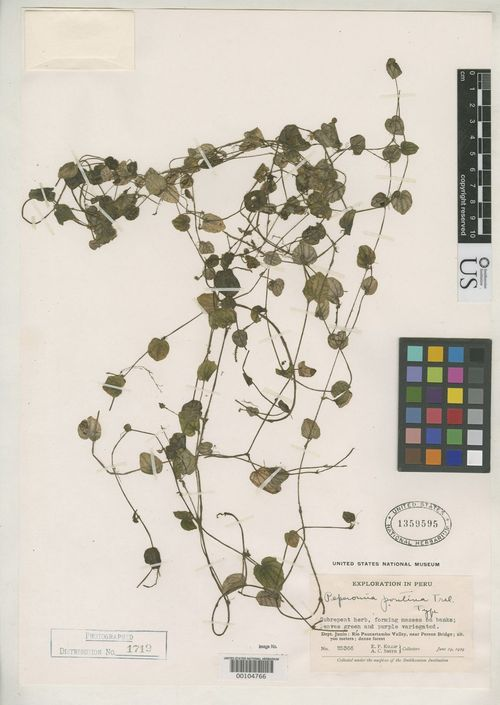

Scientific classification
- Kingdom: Plantae
- Clade: Tracheophytes
- Clade: Angiosperms
- Clade: Magnoliids
- Order: Piperales
- Family: Piperaceae
- Genus: Peperomia
- Species: P. pontina

Binomial name
- Peperomia pontina Trel.

= Peperomia pontina =

Species of plant

Peperomia pontina is a species of terrestrial or epiphytic herb in the genus Peperomia that is native to Peru. It grows on wet tropical biomes. Its conservation status is Threatened.

== Description ==
The type specimen were collected at Perené, Peru at an altitude of 700 meters above sea level.

Peperomia pontina is a creeping, interwoven, epiphytic herb with slender stems. The stems, petioles, and leaf nerves on the underside are more or less covered in crisp villous hairs. The alternate leaves are round-cordate, bluntly subacuminate, measuring 10–25 mm in both length and width. They are 7-nerved, green, and purplish in color. The petiole is 5–10 mm long. The (apparently axillary) spikes are 20 mm long and 1 mm thick, with a filiform peduncle 10–15 mm long.

== Taxonomy and naming ==
It was described in 1936 by William Trelease in Publications of the Field Museum of Natural History, Botanical Series 13, from specimens collected by Ellsworth Paine Killip & Albert Charles Smith.

The epithet is Latin for "of the bridge," referring to the type locality situated near the Perené Bridge in the Paucartambo Valley.

== Distribution and habitat ==
It is native to Peru. It grows as a terrestrial or epiphytic herb. It grows on wet tropical biomes.

== Conservation ==
This species is assessed as Threatened, in a preliminary report.
