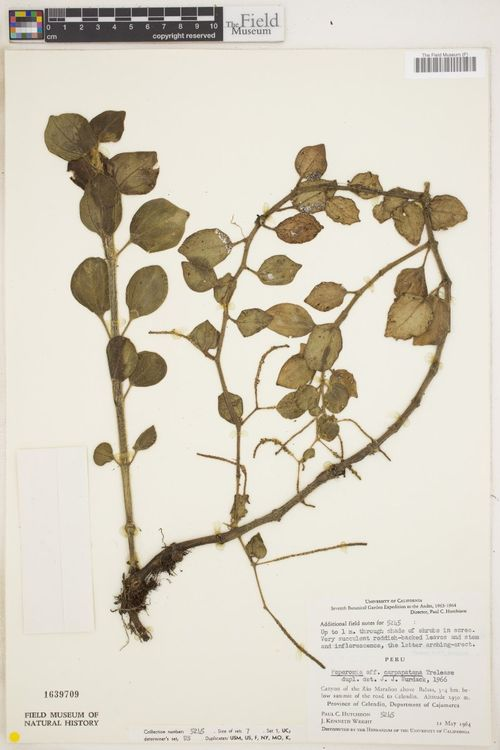

Scientific classification
- Kingdom: Plantae
- Clade: Tracheophytes
- Clade: Angiosperms
- Clade: Magnoliids
- Order: Piperales
- Family: Piperaceae
- Genus: Peperomia
- Species: P. carpapatana

Binomial name
- Peperomia carpapatana Trel.

= Peperomia carpapatana =

Species of flowering plant

Peperomia carpapatana is a species of epiphyte in the genus Peperomia that is endemic in Peru. It grows on wet tropical biomes. Its conservation status is Threatened.

== Description ==
The type specimen were collected near Carpata, Peru, at an altitude of 2,700–3,200 meters (8,900–10,500 ft).

Peperomia carpapatana is a rather large, branching herb. Its stems are 2–5 mm thick and densely covered, especially upward, with a matted indumentum of yellowish, interwoven hairs. The alternate leaves are round-ovate. The apex is rounded with a somewhat abrupt, bluntly acuminate tip, and the base is rounded or abruptly somewhat acute. They measure 2–4 cm long and 2–3.5 cm wide. The leaves are obscurely 3–5-nerved, with appressed hairs on the underside and a concolorous, granular texture. They dry to an opaque finish. The appressed-pilose petiole is 5–10 mm long. The spikes are slender, 50–150 mm (2.0–5.9 in) long, and clustered in the leaf axils with somewhat loosely inserted flowers. The peduncle is 10–15 mm long and more or less appressed-pilose. The small, globose berries are tipped with a small point and have a subapical stigma.

== Taxonomy and naming ==
It was described in 1936 by William Trelease in Publications of the Field Museum of Natural History, Botanical Series 13, from specimens collected by Ellsworth Paine Killip and Dorothea Eliza Smith. It got its name from the location where the type specimen was collected.

== Distribution and habitat ==
It is endemic in Peru. It grows on a epiphyte environment and is a herb. It grows on wet tropical biomes.

== Conservation ==
This species is assessed as Threatened, in a preliminary report.
