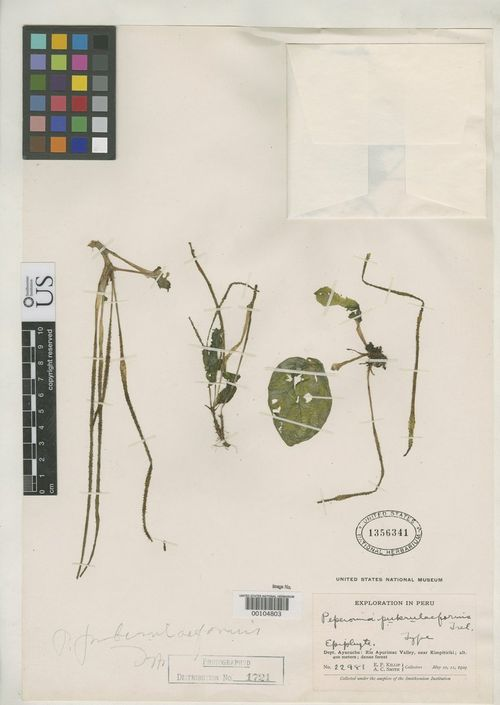

Scientific classification
- Kingdom: Plantae
- Clade: Tracheophytes
- Clade: Angiosperms
- Clade: Magnoliids
- Order: Piperales
- Family: Piperaceae
- Genus: Peperomia
- Species: P. puberuliformis

Binomial name
- Peperomia puberuliformis Trel.

= Peperomia puberuliformis =

Species of plant

Peperomia puberuliformis or Peperomia puberulaeformis is a species of terrestrial or epiphytic herb in the genus Peperomia that is native to Peru. It grows on wet tropical biomes. Its conservation status is threatened.

== Description ==
The type specimen were collected at Kimpitiriki, Peru at an altitude of 400 meters above sea level.

Peperomia puberuliformis is a medium-sized, glabrous, epiphytic, tree-dwelling herb with a short stem arising from a thick rhizome and erect. The few leaves are elliptic, obtuse, apparently rounded at the base and peltate, measuring 6 cm long and 4 cm wide. When dry, they are green, very thin, translucent, and about 7-nerved. The petiole is 3 cm long. The spikes are 150 mm long and 2 mm thick, succulent, with a peduncle 2–4 cm long. The ovary is ovoid, narrowed below a subcapitate stigma.

== Taxonomy and naming ==
It was described in 1936 by William Trelease in Publications of the Field Museum of Natural History, Botanical Series 13, from specimens collected by Ellsworth Paine Killip & Albert Charles Smith.

The epithet combines puberulus (minutely pubescent) and -formis (shaped), referring to the resemblance of this species to others in the puberula group, despite being largely glabrous.

== Distribution and habitat ==
It is native to Peru. It grows as a terrestrial or epiphytic herb. It grows on wet tropical biomes.

== Conservation ==
This species has been assessed as threatened in a preliminary report.
