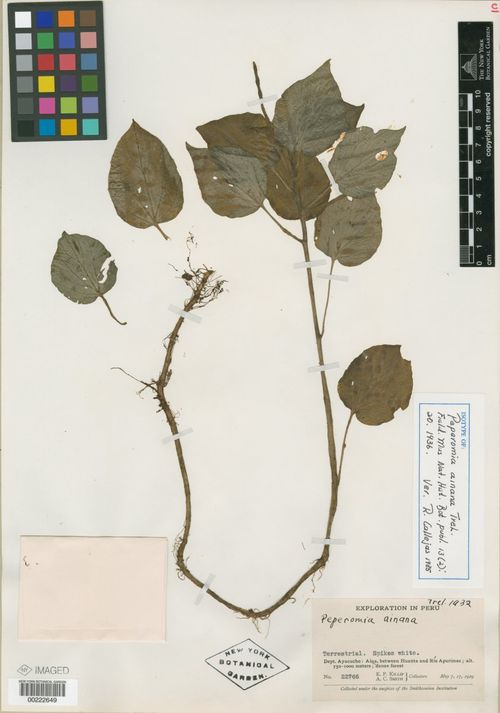

Scientific classification
- Kingdom: Plantae
- Clade: Tracheophytes
- Clade: Angiosperms
- Clade: Magnoliids
- Order: Piperales
- Family: Piperaceae
- Genus: Peperomia
- Species: P. ainana

Binomial name
- Peperomia ainana Trel.

= Peperomia ainana =

Species of flowering plant

Peperomia ainana is a species of epiphyte in the genus Peperomia that is endemic in Peru. It grows on wet tropical biomes. Its conservation status is Threatened.

== Description ==
The type specimen were collected near Río Apurímac, Peru at an altitude of 750–1,000 meters (2,460–3,280 ft).

Peperomia ainana is a moderately tall, unbranched, and smooth-textured herb. Its stems are 2 to 4 mm thick. The leaves are arranged alternately and are ovate in shape with a pointed tip. The leaf base is rounded or nearly cut straight across, tapering abruptly at the petiole. Each leaf blade measures 8 to 10 cm (3.1 to 3.9 in) in length and 5 to 7 cm (2.0 to 2.8 in) in width. The leaves feature multiple nerves, with two to three primary veins on each side of the midrib; the larger of these veins branch once or twice like the central rib. When dried, the leaves are thin and green. The slender petioles range from 3 to 8 cm (1.2 to 3.1 in) long. The flower spikes develop from a series of lateral branches, and are 40 mm (1.6 in) long and 2 mm thick. These spikes are borne on a peduncle of equal length. The floral bracts are rounded and peltate, shield-shaped with the stalk attached to the center. The ovary is globose and tipped with a small point, featuring an oblique stigma.

== Taxonomy and naming ==
It was described in 1936 by William Trelease in Publications of the Field Museum of Natural History, Botanical Series 13, from specimens collected by Ellsworth Paine Killip & Dorothea Eliza Smith. It got its name from the location where the type specimen was collected.

== Distribution and habitat ==
It is endemic in Peru. It grows on a epiphyte environment and is a herb. It grows on wet tropical biomes.

== Conservation ==
This species is assessed as Threatened, in a preliminary report.
