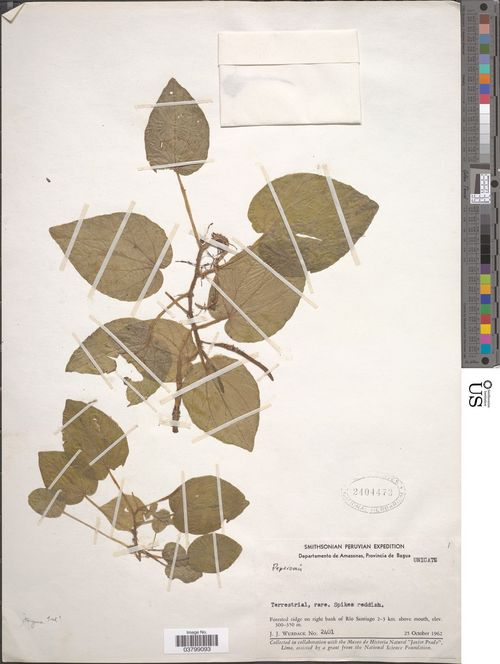

Scientific classification
- Kingdom: Plantae
- Clade: Tracheophytes
- Clade: Angiosperms
- Clade: Magnoliids
- Order: Piperales
- Family: Piperaceae
- Genus: Peperomia
- Species: P. itayana

Binomial name
- Peperomia itayana Trel.

= Peperomia itayana =

Species of plant

Peperomia itayana is a species of terrestrial or epiphytic herb in the genus Peperomia that is native to Peru. It grows on wet tropical biomes. Its conservation status is Threatened.

== Description ==
The type specimen were collected at Río Itaya, Peru at an altitude of 110 meters above sea level.

Peperomia itayana is a somewhat small, short-stemmed, glabrous herb. The few leaves are round-ovate, very obtuse, with a shortly cordate base, measuring 7–9 cm long and 6–8 cm wide. They are 7-nerved, with the midrib and lateral nerves having 4 branches, and when dry are thin and green. The petiole is 8–10 mm long (or possibly longer). The inflorescence was not seen on the type specimen.

== Taxonomy and naming ==
It was described in 1936 by William Trelease in Publications of the Field Museum of Natural History, Botanical Series 13, from specimens collected by Ellsworth Paine Killip & Albert Charles Smith.

The epithet is derived from the type locality, Río Itaya, where this species was first collected.

== Distribution and habitat ==
It is native to Peru. It grows as a terrestrial or epiphytic herb. It grows on wet tropical biomes.

== Conservation ==
This species is assessed as Threatened, in a preliminary report.
