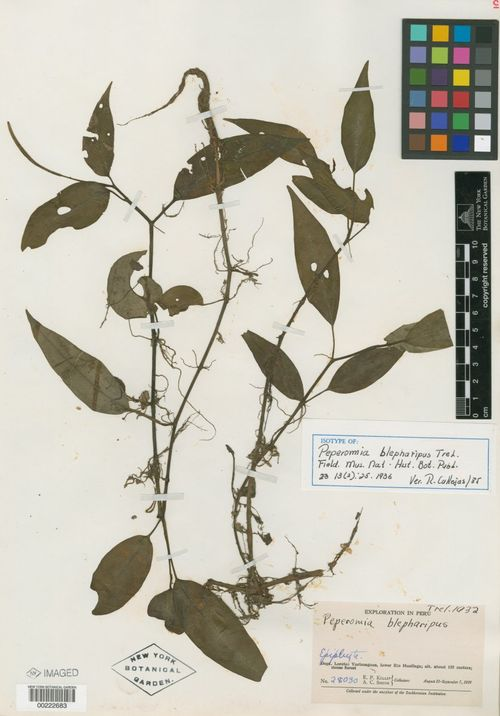

Scientific classification
- Kingdom: Plantae
- Clade: Tracheophytes
- Clade: Angiosperms
- Clade: Magnoliids
- Order: Piperales
- Family: Piperaceae
- Genus: Peperomia
- Species: P. blepharipus

Binomial name
- Peperomia blepharipus Trel.

= Peperomia blepharipus =

Species of flowering plant

Peperomia blepharipus is a species of epiphyte in the genus Peperomia that is endemic in Peru. It grows on wet tropical biomes. Its conservation status is Threatened.

== Description ==
The type specimen were collected near Yurimaguas, Peru, at an altitude of 135 meters (443 ft).

Peperomia blepharipus is a moderately tall, erect, epiphytic herb with a mostly unbranched stem, 2–3 mm thick. It is largely hairless except for the distinctive crisp-ciliate hairs on its petioles and their decurrent (extending down the stem) lines. The alternate leaves are lanceolate and pointed at both ends, measuring 8–10 cm (3.1–3.9 in) long and 2–3.5 cm (0.8–1.4 in) wide. They are 3–5-nerved from near the base, with the midrib obscurely branched above. When dry, the leaves are thin and opaque. The petioles are clasping and decurrent, varying in length from 5–10 mm on most leaves to as long as 30 mm (1.2 in) on others. The spikes are terminal or sympodial, reaching 6 cm (2.4 in) in length and 2 mm in thickness, and are borne on a peduncle about 2 cm (0.8 in) long. The floral bracts are round-peltate.

== Taxonomy and naming ==
It was described in 1936 by William Trelease in Publications of the Field Museum of Natural History, Botanical Series 13, from specimens collected by Ellsworth Paine Killip & Dorothea Eliza Smith. It got its name from the description of the type specimen.

== Subtaxa ==
Following subtaxa are accepted.

- Peperomia blepharipus var. binispica Trel.
- Peperomia blepharipus var. iquitosensis Trel.

== Distribution and habitat ==
It is endemic in Peru. It grows on a epiphyte environment and is a herb. It grows on wet tropical biomes.

== Conservation ==
This species is assessed as Threatened, in a preliminary report.
