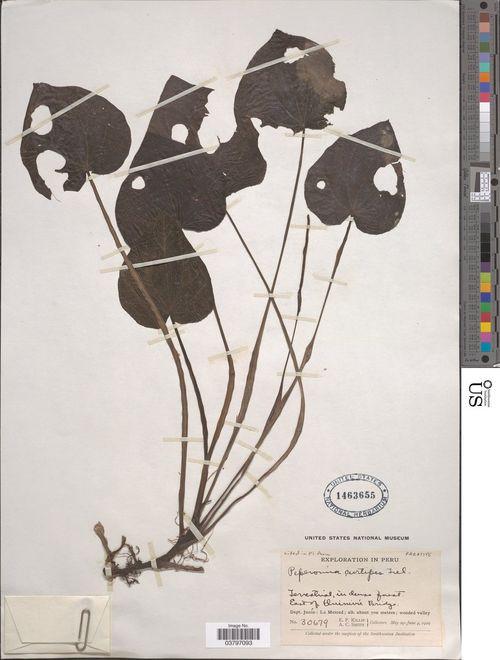

Scientific classification
- Kingdom: Plantae
- Clade: Tracheophytes
- Clade: Angiosperms
- Clade: Magnoliids
- Order: Piperales
- Family: Piperaceae
- Genus: Peperomia
- Species: P. curtipes

Binomial name
- Peperomia curtipes Trel.

= Peperomia curtipes =

Species of flowering plant

Peperomia curtipes is a species of epiphyte in the genus Peperomia that is endemic in Bolivia and Peru. It grows on wet tropical biomes. Its conservation status is Threatened.

== Description ==
The type specimen were collected near San Nicolás, Peru, at an altitude of 1,100 meters (3,600 ft).

Peperomia curtipes is an almost stemless, glabrous herb. The alternate leaves are rounded, somewhat acuminate, with a cordate base where the sinus is nearly closed. They measure 8–13 cm (3.1–5.1 in) long and 8–12 cm (3.1–4.7 in) wide, and are palmately 9-nerved (or the midrib may be obscurely branched above). When dry, the leaves turn a dark brown. The petiole is very long, 15–20 cm (5.9–7.9 in). The spikes are 50 mm (2.0 in) long and 2 mm thick or larger, with what appears to be an elongated peduncle. The ovary is globose with a subapical stigma.

== Taxonomy and naming ==
It was described in 1936 by William Trelease in Publications of the Field Museum of Natural History, Botanical Series 13, from specimens collected by Ellsworth Paine Killip and Dorothea Eliza Smith. It got its epithet from the Latin curtus + pes, meaning "short-footed", referring to the stemless habit of this species.

== Subtaxa ==
Following subtaxa are accepted.

- Peperomia curtipes var. contracta Trel.

== Distribution and habitat ==
It is endemic in Bolivia and Peru. It grows on a epiphyte environment and is a herb. It grows on wet tropical biomes.

== Conservation ==
This species is assessed as Threatened, in a preliminary report.
