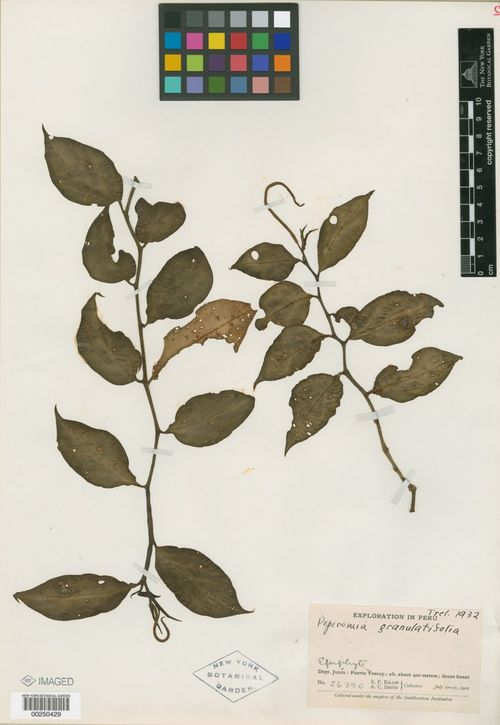

Scientific classification
- Kingdom: Plantae
- Clade: Tracheophytes
- Clade: Angiosperms
- Clade: Magnoliids
- Order: Piperales
- Family: Piperaceae
- Genus: Peperomia
- Species: P. granulatifolia

Binomial name
- Peperomia granulatifolia Trel.

= Peperomia granulatifolia =

Species of epiphyte

Peperomia granulatifolia is a species of epiphyte in the genus Peperomia that is native to Peru. It grows on wet tropical biomes. Its conservation status is Threatened.

== Description ==
The type specimen were collected at Puerto Yessup, Peru.

Peperomia granulatifolia is a rather large, pendulous, epiphytic, glabrous herb with very slender stems. The alternate leaves are elliptic, acuminate, with an acute base, measuring 4–7 cm long and 2–3.5 cm wide. When dry, they are leathery with obscure pinnate venation. The petiole is 5 mm long. The spikes are terminal and sympodial, either solitary or paired at the apex of a short, 2-bracteate branchlet. They reach 100 mm in length or more, and are 1 mm thick, borne on a peduncle 5–10 mm long.

== Taxonomy and naming ==
It was described in 1936 by William Trelease in Publications of the Field Museum of Natural History, Botanical Series 13 from specimens collected by Ellsworth Paine Killip & Dorothea Eliza Smith . The epithet granulatifolia combines the Latin granulatus and folia, referring to the granular texture of the leaves, particularly noticeable when dry.

== Distribution and habitat ==
It is native to Peru. It grows as a epiphyte and is a herb. It grows on wet tropical biomes.

== Conservation ==
This species is assessed as Threatened, in a preliminary report.
