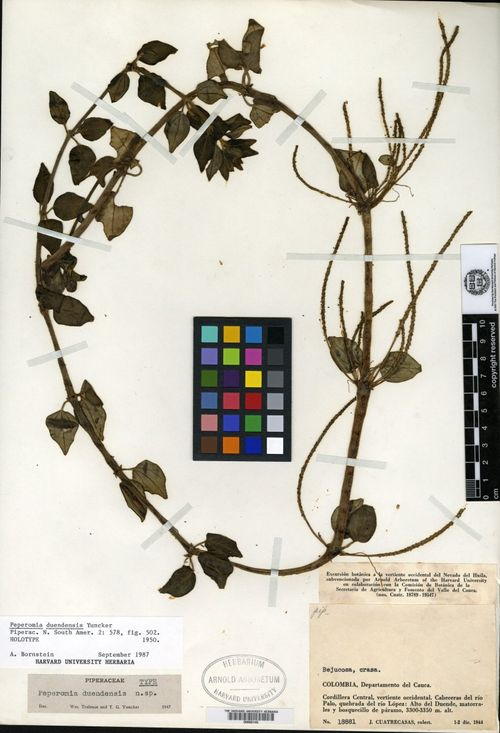

Scientific classification
- Kingdom: Plantae
- Clade: Tracheophytes
- Clade: Angiosperms
- Clade: Magnoliids
- Order: Piperales
- Family: Piperaceae
- Genus: Peperomia
- Species: P. duendensis

Binomial name
- Peperomia duendensis Yunck.

= Peperomia duendensis =

Species of plant endemic to Colombia

Peperomia duendensis is a species of epiphyte in the genus Peperomia that is endemic in Colombia. It grows on wet tropical biomes. Its conservation status is Threatened.

== Description ==
The first specimens where collected in Cauca, Colombia.

Peperomia duendensis is a rather large, fleshy, scrambling herb with a stem 3–4 mm thick and 1 m or more long. The internodes range from 1–2 cm long above to 10 cm (3.9 in) below, densely covered with soft hairs up to 1.5 mm long on the upper portions, becoming more sparse downward. The leaves are arranged three per node, ovate or elliptic-ovate on the upper parts, measuring 1.5–2.5 cm wide by 2–3 cm long, with narrowed apex that is acute or bluntish, and base that is obtuse or somewhat acute, or subcordate on lower leaves. Both surfaces are loosely covered with appressed soft hairs, with long ciliate hairs above the middle, and display five main veins radiating palmately. The leaves dry firm and somewhat opaque, dark above and paler and granulate beneath. The petiole is 5–10 mm long and loosely hairy. The spikes appear in whorls of 4–8 from the lower nodes, 2 mm thick and up to 10 cm long, loosely flowered, on peduncles 1–3 cm long that are loosely hairy to nearly hairless. The bracts are round-peltate, about 1 mm in diameter. The fruit is about 1 mm long, globose-ovoid with oblique apex and base, and subapical stigma.

The combination of its large, fleshy, scrambling habit with long villous stems bearing soft hairs up to 1.5 mm long, the distinctive whorled arrangement of three leaves per node, and the numerous rather long spikes emerging from intermediate or lower nodes rather than upper nodes are characteristic. The ovate leaves with long-ciliate margins above the middle, drying firm and subopaque with granulate undersides, together with the whorled spikes of 4–8 from lower nodes on peduncles 1–3 cm long, distinguish it from P. pampalcana, which has mostly opposite leaves, shorter peduncles, and mostly solitary spikes in the leaf axils.

== Taxonomy and naming ==
It was described in 1950 by Truman G. Yuncker in The Piperaceae of northern South America 2, from specimens collected by José Cuatrecasas. It got its name from location where the specimens were first collected, which was in Alto del Duende.

== Distribution and habitat ==
It is endemic in Colombia. It grows on a epiphyte environment and is a herb. In Colombia, its elevation range is 3,300–3,350 meters (10,830–10,990 ft). It grows on wet tropical biomes.

== Conservation ==
This species is assessed as Threatened, in a preliminary report.
