= Schisandra neglecta =

Scientific classification
- Kingdom: Plantae
- Clade: Embryophytes
- Clade: Tracheophytes
- Clade: Spermatophytes
- Clade: Angiosperms
- Order: Austrobaileyales
- Family: Schisandraceae
- Genus: Schisandra
- Species: S. neglecta

Binomial name
- Schisandra neglecta A.C.Sm.

Synonyms
- Schisandra lancifolia var. polycarpa Z.Ho

Species of flowering plant

Schisandra neglecta is a species of flowering plant in the family Schisandraceae. It was described in 1947, and is native to south Asia.

Schisandra neglecta is a climbing plant with white, orange, yellow, or red flowers. It is used in medicine.

== Taxonomy ==
Schisandra neglecta was described by Albert Charles Smith in 1947.

== Distribution ==
The species is native to the temperate biome of India (Assam), Bangladesh, south central China (south Sichuan and possibly Yunnan), Myanmar, and Nepal. The species grows in forests and thickets, and often near rivers. It is present at elevations of 1,700–2,900 metres (5,600–9,500 ft).

== Description ==
Schisandra neglecta is a climbing plant. The plants are smooth throughout. The leaf-bearing branches are elongated.

The leaf stems are 0.7–3 centimetres (0.28–1.18 in) long. The leaves are elliptical to ovate in shape, papery to subleathery, 5–11 centimetres (2.0–4.3 in) long, and 2–4.5 centimetres (0.79–1.77 in) wide.

The flowers are solitary. The male flowers have 1.3–4.9 centimetres (0.51–1.93 in) stems, and have twelve to forty stamens. The female flowers have 2.1–6.5 centimetres (0.83–2.56 in) stems, and twenty to forty-five carpels. The flowers have six to ten tepals, which can be white, yellow, orange, or pink. The largest tepals are 5–9 millimetres (0.20–0.35 in) long, and 4.5–7.5 millimetres (0.18–0.30 in) wide. The plant flowers in May and July.

The fruit stems are 3.5–7.5 centimetres (1.4–3.0 in) long. The seed cases are smooth, finely wrinkled, or rarely covered in tubercules. The plant fruits in July and November.

Albert Charles Smith described Schisandra neglecta as most similar to Schisandra sphenanthera and Schisandra rubriflora.

== Uses ==
Schisandra neglecta is used in medicine.

== Names ==
In Chinese, the species is known as 滇藏五味子 (dian zang wu wei zi).
