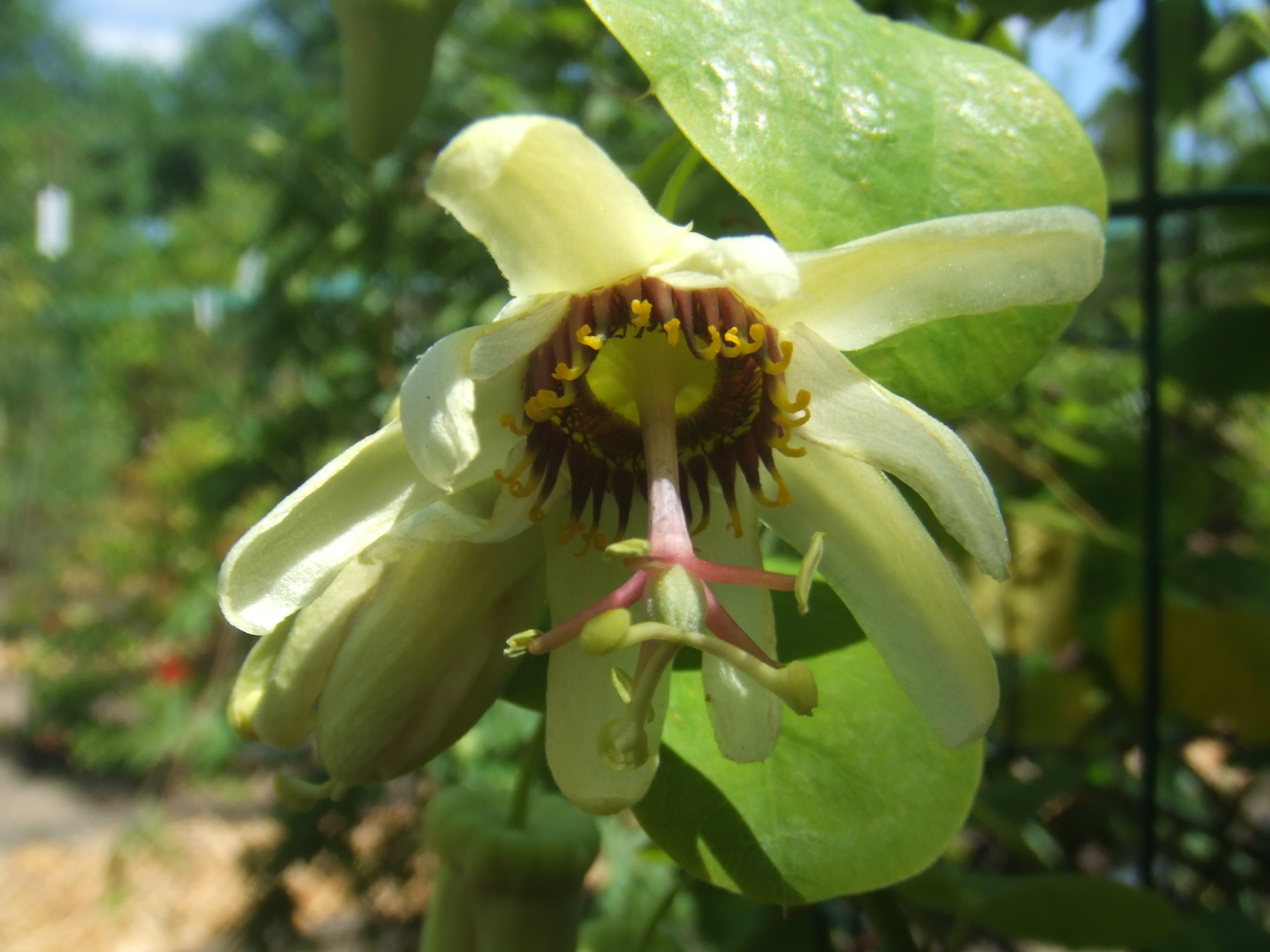

Scientific classification
- Kingdom: Plantae
- Clade: Tracheophytes
- Clade: Angiosperms
- Clade: Eudicots
- Clade: Rosids
- Order: Malpighiales
- Family: Passifloraceae
- Genus: Passiflora
- Species: P. yucatanensis

Binomial name
- Passiflora yucatanensis Killip

= Passiflora yucatanensis =

Species of vine

Passiflora yucatanensis is a rare species of passionflower, known only from the Mexican island of Cozumel, which has recently been introduced to horticulture.
