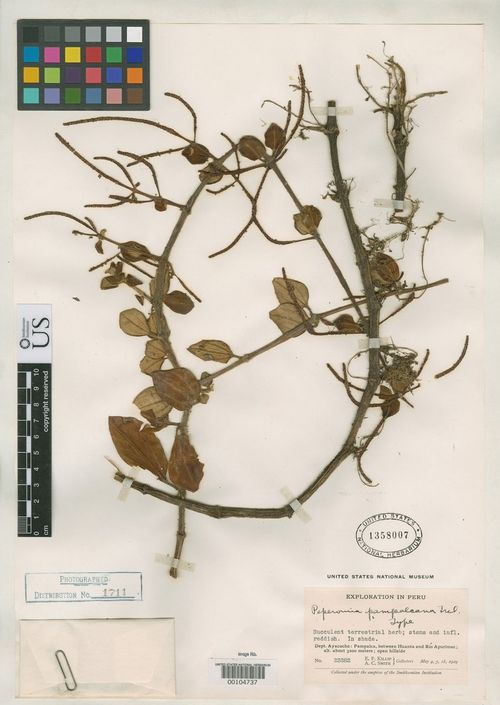

Scientific classification
- Kingdom: Plantae
- Clade: Tracheophytes
- Clade: Angiosperms
- Clade: Magnoliids
- Order: Piperales
- Family: Piperaceae
- Genus: Peperomia
- Species: P. pampalcana

Binomial name
- Peperomia pampalcana Trel.

= Peperomia pampalcana =

Species of plant

Peperomia pampalcana is a species of terrestrial or epiphytic herb in the genus Peperomia that is native to Peru. It grows on wet tropical biomes. Its conservation status has been evaluated as threatened.

== Description ==
The type specimen were collected at Pampalca, Peru at an altitude of 3200 meters above sea level.

Peperomia pampalcana is a tall, forked or divaricately branched, succulent herb with a stem 3–5 mm thick, sparsely covered in stiff villous hairs. The leaves are opposite or rarely in whorls of 3. They are elliptic to round-ovate, bluntly short-acuminate, with a rounded to somewhat acute base, measuring about 4 cm long and 3.5 cm wide. Upper leaves are smaller (1.5 cm long, 1 cm wide), and on the ultimate flowering branchlets, they are reduced to 8 mm long and 5 mm wide. The leaves are 3-nerved (or 5-nerved on longer ones), firm when dry, brown above, yellowish beneath, and loosely villous. The petiole is about 1 cm long, much shorter on reduced leaves. The spikes are solitary in the axils of reduced leaves and also terminal on short branchlets, appearing somewhat paniculate. They are 40–60 mm long and 3 mm thick, with a sparsely pilose peduncle 10–15 mm long. The berries are ovoid, pointed, and bear a pseudocupula, with an apical stigma.

== Taxonomy and naming ==
It was described in 1936 by William Trelease in Publications of the Field Museum of Natural History, Botanical Series 13, from specimens collected by Ellsworth Paine Killip & Albert Charles Smith.

The epithet pampalcana is derived from the type locality.

== Distribution and habitat ==
It is native to Peru. It grows as a terrestrial or epiphytic herb. It grows on wet tropical biomes.

== Conservation ==
This species has been assessed as threatened in a preliminary report.
