= Killipia =

Scientific classification
- Kingdom: Plantae
- Clade: Tracheophytes
- Clade: Angiosperms
- Clade: Eudicots
- Clade: Rosids
- Order: Myrtales
- Family: Melastomataceae
- Genus: Killipia; Gleason

Genus of plants

Killipia is a genus of flowering plants belonging to the family Melastomataceae. It is now a synonym of Miconia Ruiz & Pav..

It is native range was Colombia and Ecuador.

The former genus name of Killipia was in honour of Ellsworth Paine Killip (1890–1968), an English painter and illustrator. It was first published in Bull. Torrey Bot. Club 52: 456 in 1925.
