= Anne Kingsbury Wollstonecraft =

American botanist, scientific illustrator, writer and advocate for women's rights

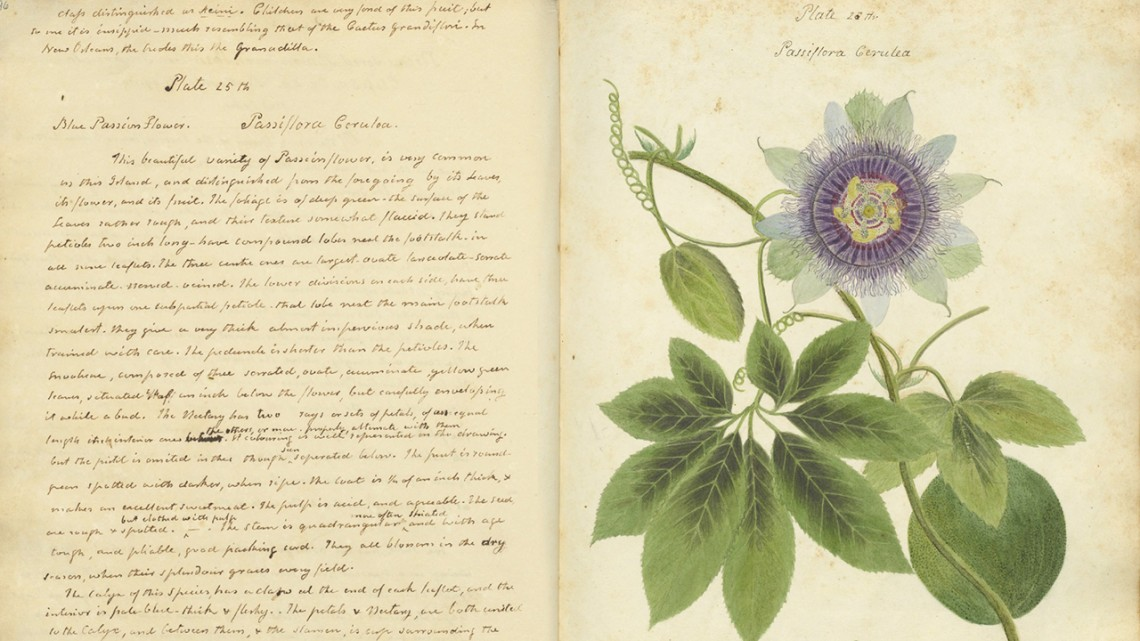
- Anne Kingsbury Wollstonecraft. Blue Passion Flower. Passiflora Cerulea, ca. 1826. Vol. I, Pl. 25.
- Born: October 29, 1791; Rindge, New Hampshire, US
- Died: May 16, 1828 (aged 36); Matanzas, Cuba

Anne Kingsbury Wollstonecraft (29 October 1791 – 16 May 1828) was an American botanist, naturalist, botanical illustrator, and women's rights advocate, active in colonial Cuba in the early nineteenth century.

== Family ==
Anne Kingsbury was born 29 October 1791, in Rindge, New Hampshire. Her parents were Benjamin Kingsbury and Abigail Sawin (1748–1793). She married Charles Wollstonecraft, whose sister Mary Wollstonecraft achieved fame in Britain as a philosopher, author, and advocate for the rights of women. One of her nephews by marriage was Edward Wollstonecraft, a successful businessman in early colonial Australia.

== Career ==
Following the death of her husband in 1817, Anne Wollstonecraft moved to Matanzas, Cuba. While there, she studied the flora of the island, and in the mid-1820s, created an extensive illustrated manuscript, Specimens of the Plants and Fruits of the Island of Cuba, an important resource for the study of natural history in colonial Cuba. She was able to publish several of her botanical discoveries during her life, many under the pseudonym D'Anville. One letter was published in the Boston Monthly Magazine. However, although she sent the almost completed manuscript to a publisher months before her death, Specimens of the Plants and Fruits of the Island of Cuba was never published. As well as drawings and descriptions of plants, the manuscript also included records of their indigenous uses.

While Wollstonecraft devoted most of her writing to botany and ecology, she also wrote in support of women's rights, including The Natural Rights of Women, also published in the Boston Monthly Magazine. Wollstonecraft died May 16, 1828.

== Legacy ==
Wollstonecraft's three-volume manuscript, Specimens of the Plants and Fruits of the Island of Cuba, was thought by scholars to be a lost work. There were references to it, but no-one had seen it. It had been donated to Cornell University in 1923 by a faculty member who was descended from her family, but because early references to the work misidentified the author's name, its significance was not recognized. It was located and its significance appreciated in March 2018 through the process of digitization. It has now been made available to view or download online via the HathiTrust Digital Library, courtesy of the Cornell University Library.
