= Albert Charles Smith =

American botanist (1906-1999)

- Born: April 5, 1906; Springfield, Massachusetts, United States
- Died: May 23, 1999 (aged 93)
- Education: Columbia University (BA, PhD)
- Scientific career
- Fields: Botany
- Institutions: National Museum of Natural History; American Society of Plant Taxonomists; United States National Academy of Sciences

Albert Charles Smith (April 5, 1906 – May 23, 1999) was an American botanist who served as director of the National Museum of Natural History and Arnold Arboretum and was the former president of the American Society of Plant Taxonomists.

== Life ==
Smith was born on April 5, 1906, in Springfield, Massachusetts. He received his bachelor's degree from Columbia University in 1926 and his PhD in 1933.

In 1928, he became a staff member of the New York Botanical Garden and made his first tropical trips to Colombia, Peru, and Brazil from 1926 to 1929.

He later left New York City to be director of the Arnold Arboretum at Harvard and worked there until 1948 when he joined the Smithsonian Institution.

At the Smithsonian, he was first director of the Department of Botany and then a director of the National Museum of Natural History, and chaired several important scientific societies, such as the American Society of Plant Taxonomists.

From 1962 to 1963, he was the Assistant Secretary of the Smithsonian Institution and a program director of the National Science Foundation.

Smith was elected to membership in the United States National Academy of Sciences in 1963, and was a distinguished botanist who specialized in Pteridophytes and Spermatophytes at the University of Hawaiʻi until 1970. He moved to the University of Massachusetts until 1976 before returning to Hawaii to work at the National Tropical Botanical Garden. He formerly worked in the United States and Fiji.
