= Dorothea Eliza Smith =

Welsh scientific illustrator and botanical artist

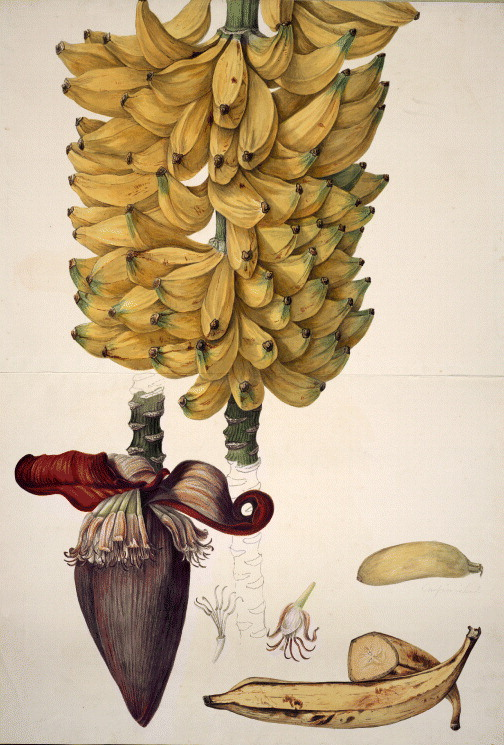
- Folding watercolour of the forms of a banana published in Smith's Fruits of the Lima Market
- Born: Dorothea Eliza Peers; 29 January 1804; Llanfwrog, Ruthin, North Wales
- Died: 6 November 1864 (aged 60); Edinburgh, Scotland
- Known for: botanical paintings
- Spouse(s): (1) William Kerr (m. 1828, his death c. 1840); (2) Archibald Smith (m. 1840)
- Children: 4

Dorothea Eliza Smith (1804–1864) was a botanical artist noted for painting South American fruit. A relatively obscure figure, her works were considered valuable by European botanists who lacked access to South American flora.

== Personal life ==
Smith was born in Llanfwrog near Ruthin, North Wales, on 29 January 1804, the third child of at least seven children of Colonel Joseph and Dorothy Peers. In 1828 she married William Kerr, a merchant trading from Caracas, Venezuela, but by 1840 he had died. She married again in 1840 in Birkenhead to Archibald Smith, a Scottish medical doctor who had worked in Peru. The couple initially lived in Argyll, Scotland and soon had four children. However, in 1848 the eldest, Dorothy, and her father were in a shipwreck on the Peruvian coast and the child was drowned. Smith and the remaining children soon joined her husband in Peru, taking the sailing route around Cape Horn. By 1855 the entire family had probably returned to the UK. Smith died in Edinburgh on 6 November 1864.

== Botanical illustrations ==
Smith is primarily known for a bound volume of 30 watercolours, Fruits of the Lima Market. The works comprising the volume were produced between 1850 and 1853 during the short time that Smith was in Peru with her second husband (who was employed by a mining company). The illustrations, as well as being aesthetically pleasing compositions, included botanical details of the fruits through cross-sections and mature seed pods as well as written information such as local and scientific names and the time of year when the fruit was available. It included illustrations of species (such as Campomanesia lineatifolia) that were little known to European scientists at the time.

Following her death, the volume was kept and circulated to interested scientists. It was acquired by the Crewe Hall library and then by Paul and Rachel Mellon in 1957 and is now held among the rare books and manuscripts at the Oak Spring Garden Foundation in Virginia, US.

== See also ==
- Maria Sibylla Merian
- Anne Kingsbury Wollstonecraft
