= Ellsworth Paine Killip =

American botanist (1890–1968)

- Born: September 2, 1890
- Died: November 21, 1968 (aged 78)
- Education: University of Rochester
- Scientific career
- Fields: Botany
- Workplaces: Smithsonian (United States National Museum)
- Author abbrev. (botany): Killip

Ellsworth Paine Killip (September 2, 1890 – November 21, 1968) was a U.S. botanist. His name is linked to over 600 species names. Around 150 species are named for him, including Linanthus killipii. Killip specialized in the taxonomy of South American plants.

Killip joined the staff of the United States National Museum (USNM; now known as the Smithsonian Institution) in 1919 as an Aide in the Division of Plants. He was promoted to Assistant Curator in 1927, Associate Curator in 1928, and Curator in 1946. In 1947, Killip was appointed Head Curator of the newly established Department of Botany, USNM, a position he retained until his retirement in 1950.

In 1925, Killipia was a genus of flowering plants from Colombia and Ecuador, belonging to the family Melastomataceae, named after him. It is now been downgraded to a synonym of Miconia.
