= Buddleja × alata =

Scientific classification
- Kingdom: Plantae
- Clade: Embryophytes
- Clade: Tracheophytes
- Clade: Spermatophytes
- Clade: Angiosperms
- Clade: Eudicots
- Clade: Asterids
- Order: Lamiales
- Family: Scrophulariaceae
- Genus: Buddleja
- Species: B. × alata

Binomial name
- Buddleja × alata Rehder & E.H.Wilson

Species of plant

Buddleja × alata Rehder & E.H.Wilson is endemic to western Sichuan, China, growing at elevations of 1,300–3,000 m; it was first described and named by Rehder and Wilson in 1913. Leeuwenberg found the plant to be such a perfect intermediate of Buddleja albiflora and Buddleja nivea as to consider it a hybrid of the two species.

== Description ==
Buddleja × alata grows to between heights of 1–3 m in the wild. The stems are tetragonous and winged. The leaves are lanceolate, acuminate at the apex, 14–28 cm long, glabrous above, tomentose beneath. The inflorescences, which appear in August, are narrow terminal and axillary panicles, 10–20 cm long, and comprise white flowers with yellow eyes.

== Cultivation ==
The species is uncommon in cultivation.
