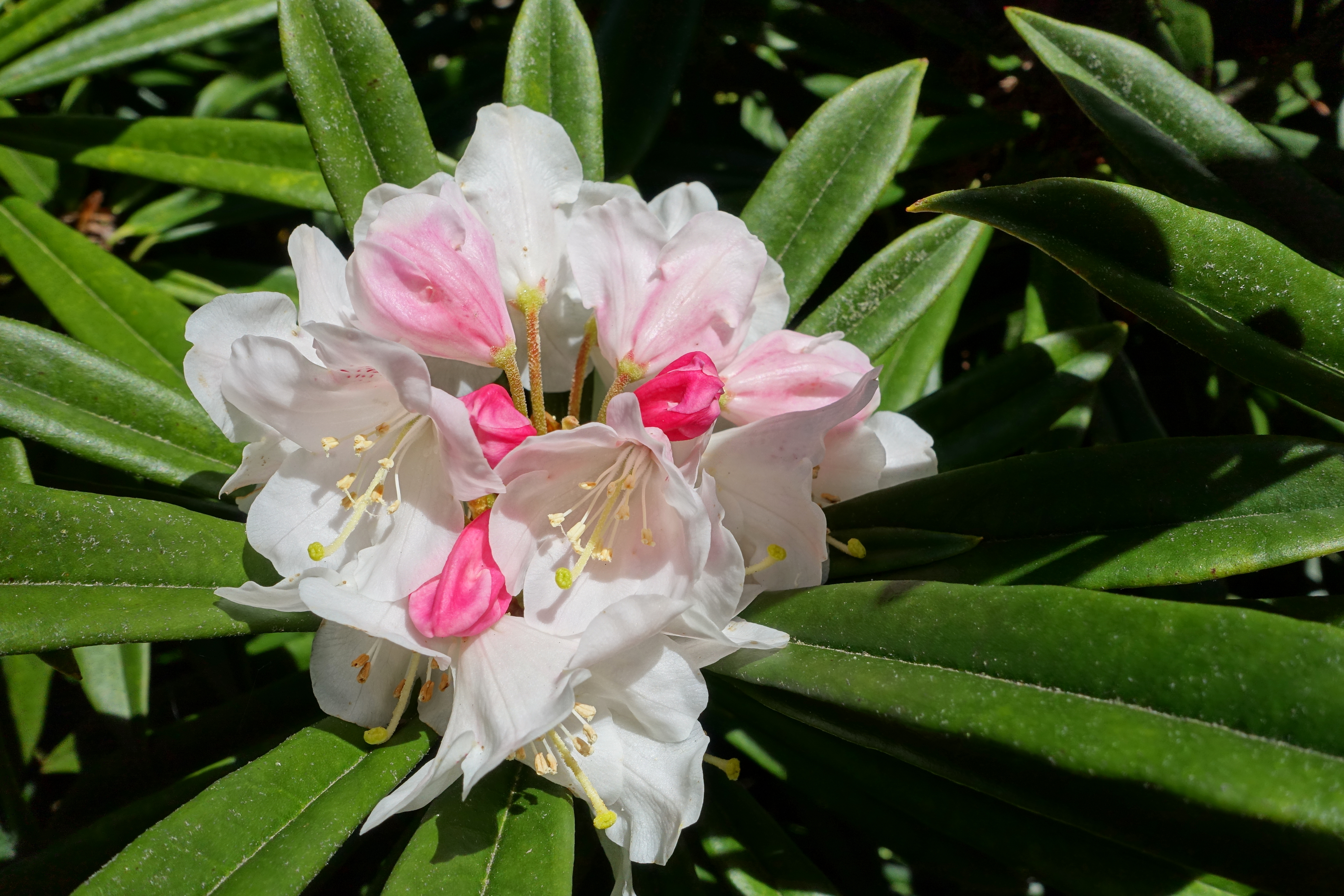

Scientific classification
- Kingdom: Plantae
- Clade: Tracheophytes
- Clade: Angiosperms
- Clade: Eudicots
- Clade: Asterids
- Order: Ericales
- Family: Ericaceae
- Genus: Rhododendron
- Species: R. thayerianum

Binomial name
- Rhododendron thayerianum Rehder & E.H.Wilson (1913)

= Rhododendron thayerianum =

Species of plant

Rhododendron thayerianum (反边杜鹃) is a rhododendron species native to western Sichuan in China, where it grows at elevations of 2,600–3,000 m (8,500–9,800 ft). It is an evergreen shrub that grows to 3–4 m (9.8–13.1 ft) in height, with leathery leaves that are narrowly oblanceolate, and 9–17 × 1.5–2.5 cm in size. The flowers are white, sometimes deeply flushed pink on the outside along the petal ridges, or pink. It flowers quite late in the season, in June and July.
