= E. giganteum =

E. giganteum may refer to:

- Equisetum giganteum, a horsetail species native to South America and Central America
- Eriogonum giganteum, the St. Catherine's lace, a wild buckwheat shrub species
- Eryngium giganteum, a plant species

== See also ==
- Giganteum
