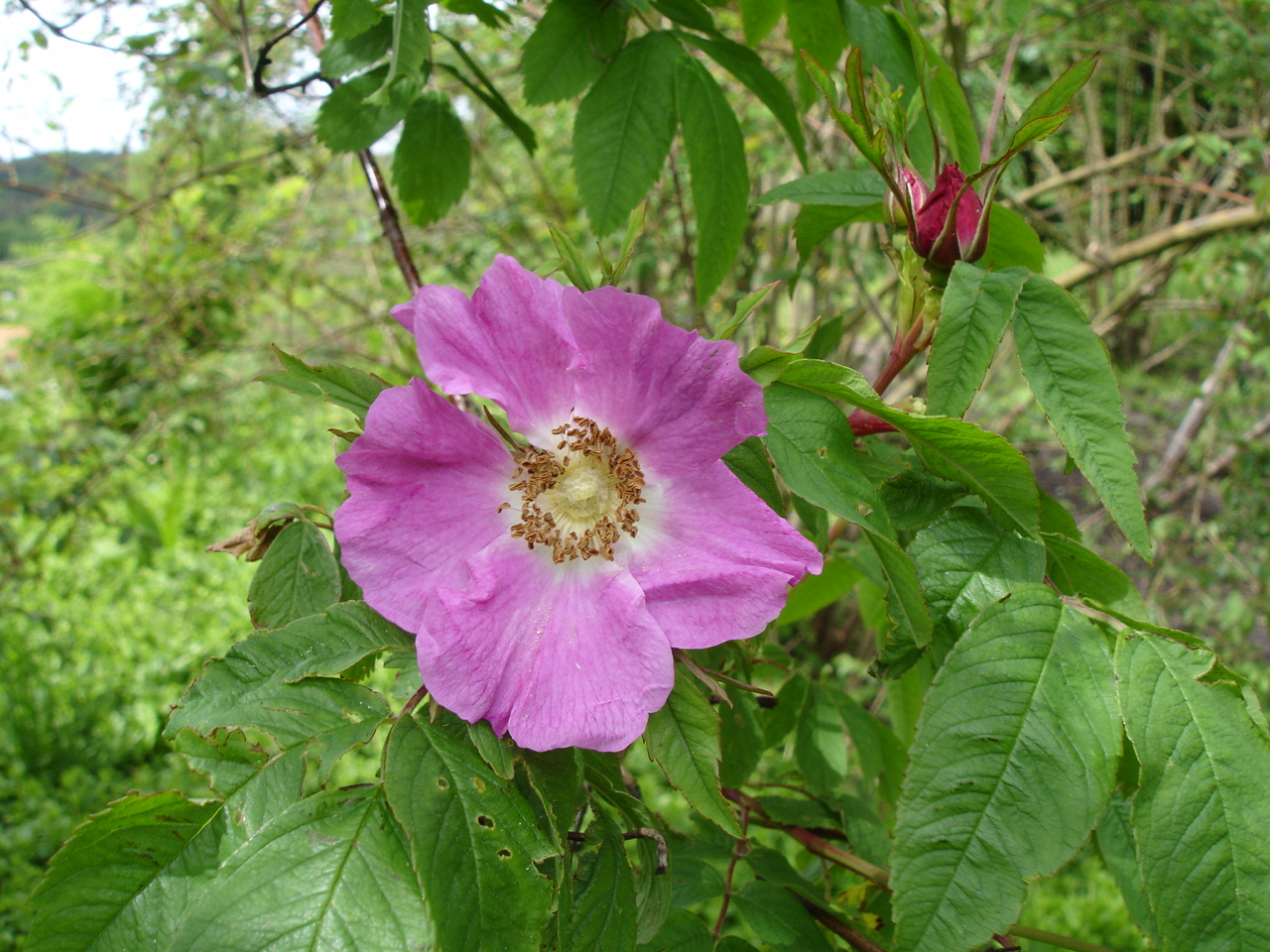

Scientific classification
- Kingdom: Plantae
- Clade: Embryophytes
- Clade: Tracheophytes
- Clade: Spermatophytes
- Clade: Angiosperms
- Clade: Eudicots
- Clade: Rosids
- Order: Rosales
- Family: Rosaceae
- Genus: Rosa
- Species: R. bella

Binomial name
- Rosa bella Rehder & E.H.Wilson

= Rosa bella =

Species of flowering plant

Rosa bella is a species of flowering plant in the Rosaceae family. It belongs to the Rosa genus. This species is native to northern and eastern China. It is a shrub that grows in temperate environments. The species was first published in C.S. Sargent, Plantae Wilsonianae 2: 341 (1915).

== Taxonomy ==
Two accepted infraspecies are currently recognized: Rosa bella var. bella and Rosa bella var. nuda T.T.Yu & H.T.Tsai.

== Description ==
Its flowers have pink petals with a slight white coloration.
