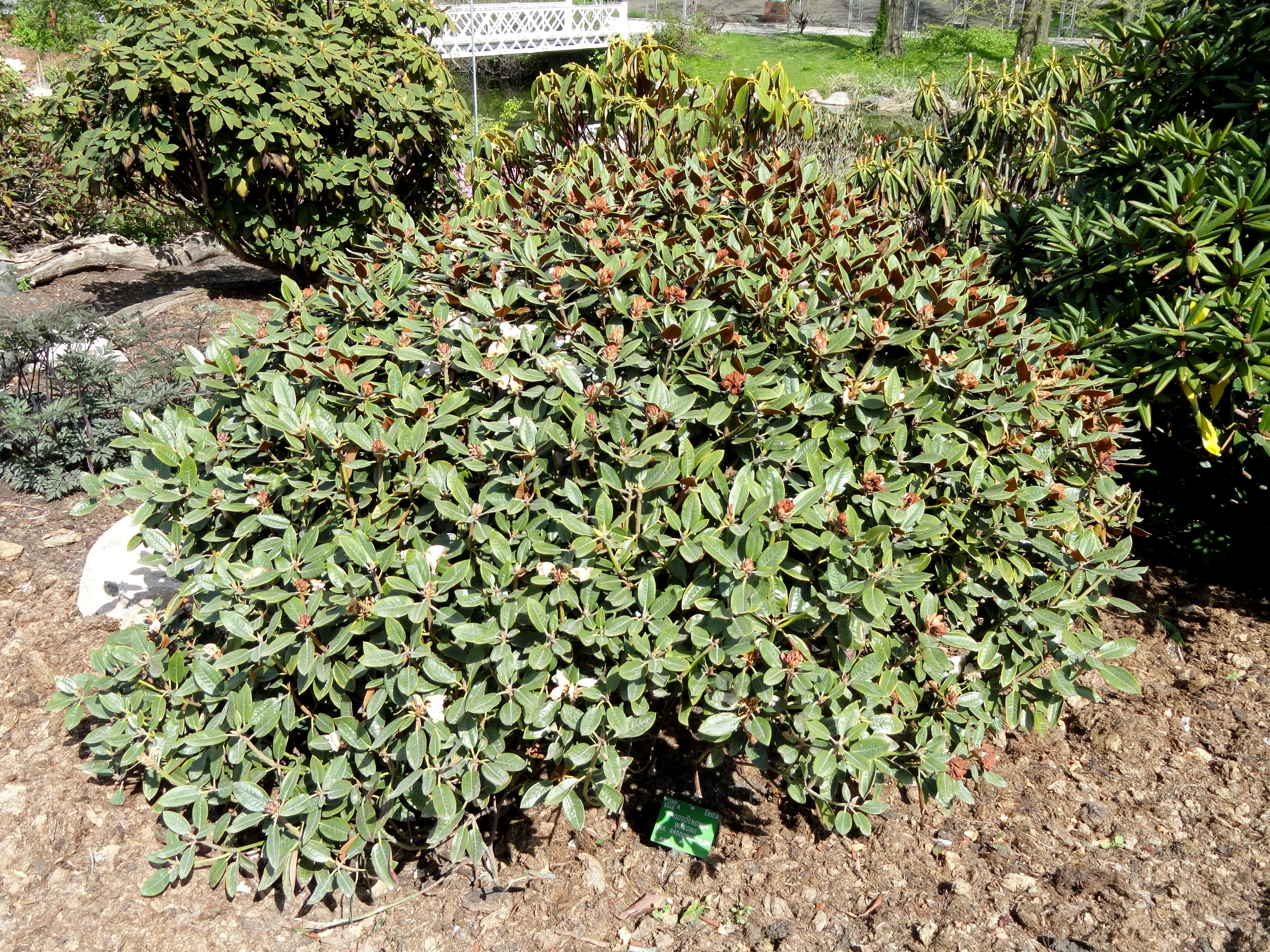
- Rhododendron watsonii var. rhododactylum

Conservation status
- Least Concern (IUCN 3.1)

Scientific classification
- Kingdom: Plantae
- Clade: Tracheophytes
- Clade: Angiosperms
- Clade: Eudicots
- Clade: Asterids
- Order: Ericales
- Family: Ericaceae
- Genus: Rhododendron
- Species: R. watsonii

Binomial name
- Rhododendron watsonii Hemsl. & E.H.Wilson

= Rhododendron watsonii =

Species of plant

Rhododendron watsonii (无柄杜鹃) is a species of flowering plant in the family Ericaceae. It is native to southern Gansu and western Sichuan in China, where it grows at altitudes of 2,500–3,000 m (8,200–9,800 ft). It is an evergreen shrub or small tree growing to 1.5–6 m (4.9–19.7 ft) in height, with leathery leaves that are oblong-elliptic to broadly oblanceolate or obovate, 10–33 by 4–10 cm in size. The flowers are white.
