= Leadwood =

Leadwood may refer to:

- Ceratostigma, a genus of flowering plants native to Africa and Asia
- Combretum imberbe, an African tree
- Krugiodendron ferreum, a species of tree found in the Americas
- Leadwood, Missouri, U.S.
