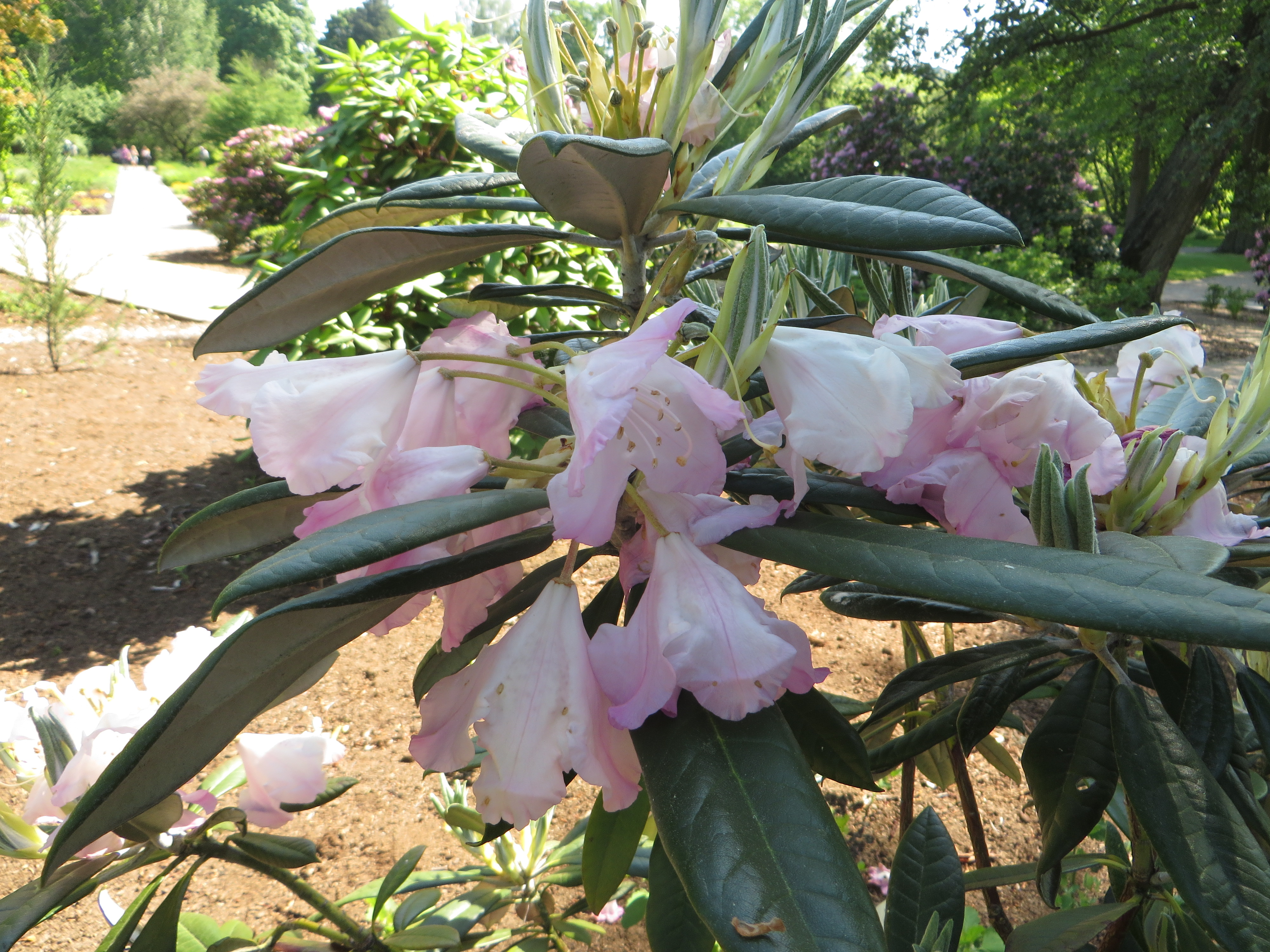

Scientific classification
- Kingdom: Plantae
- Clade: Tracheophytes
- Clade: Angiosperms
- Clade: Eudicots
- Clade: Asterids
- Order: Ericales
- Family: Ericaceae
- Genus: Rhododendron
- Species: R. insigne

Binomial name
- Rhododendron insigne Hemsl. & E.H.Wilson

= Rhododendron insigne =

Species of plant

Rhododendron insigne (不凡杜鹃) is a species of flowering plant in the family Ericaceae. It is native to southern Sichuan in China, where it grows at altitudes of 700–2,000 m (2,300–6,600 ft). This evergreen shrub grows to 1.5–6 m (4.9–19.7 ft) in height, with leathery leaves that are obovate-elliptic, obovate-lanceolate, oblong, or oblong-lanceolate, 8–13 by 2.5–4.5 cm in size. The flowers are pale to dark pink.
