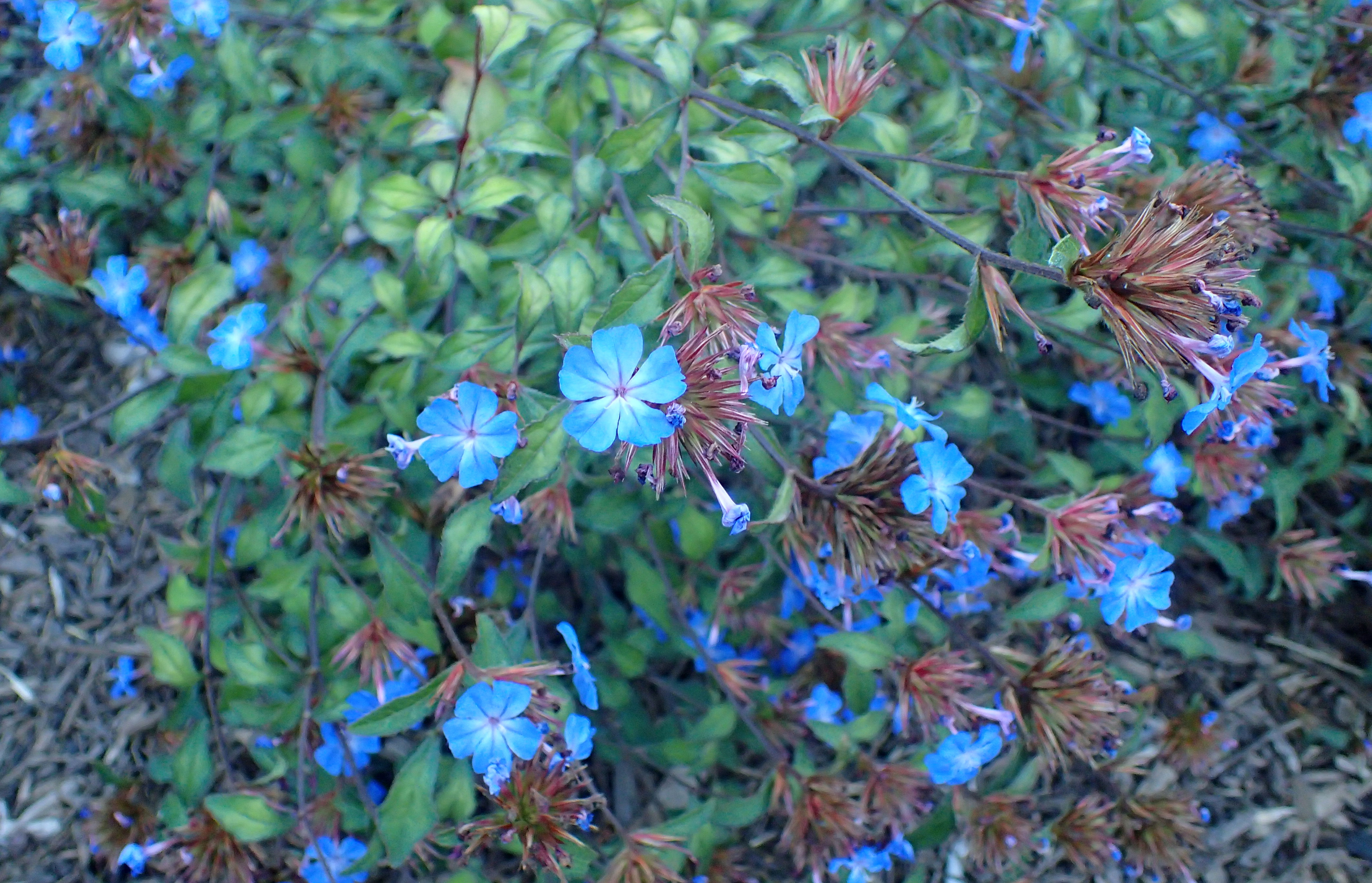

Scientific classification
- Kingdom: Plantae
- Clade: Tracheophytes
- Clade: Angiosperms
- Clade: Eudicots
- Order: Caryophyllales
- Family: Plumbaginaceae
- Genus: Ceratostigma
- Species: C. willmottianum

Binomial name
- Ceratostigma willmottianum Stapf

= Ceratostigma willmottianum =

Species of flowering plant

Ceratostigma willmottianum, Chinese plumbago, is a species of flowering plant in the family Plumbaginaceae that is native to western China and Tibet. It is an ornamental deciduous shrub that grows to 1 metre in height, with pale blue plumbago-like flowers appearing in autumn as the leaves start to turn red.

== Description ==
It is a small shrub that develops a rhizome as a perennial organ and reaches heights of up to 2 meters. The small, pointed leaves are densely hairy and are shed every year.

There are three to seven flowers in an inflorescence. The hermaphrodite flowers have five petals. The five petals are fused together in a tube. The corolla tube is purple and the corolla lobes are bright blue. Capsule fruits measuring around 6 mm with black seeds are formed.

== Distribution ==
This species is native to East Asia and the Himalayas (Chinese provinces: Gansu, western Guizhou, southern and western Sichuan, southeastern Xizang, eastern and northern Yunnan). It grows in warm valleys at altitudes between 700 and 3500 m above sea level.

== Etymology ==
Ceratostigma is derived from Greek, meaning 'horned stigma'. This is in reference to the 'shape of the stigmatic surface'.

The specific epithet willmottianum was named for Miss Ellen Ann Willmott (1858-1934), a keen gardener and plant introducer from Warley Place, Essex, UK.

== Cultivation ==
Ceratostigma willmottianum is cultivated as a garden plant, valued for its late season red leaves and rich blue flowers. Both the species and the cultivar Forest Blue ('Lice') have gained the Royal Horticultural Society's Award of Garden Merit. There is also a cultivar with yellow foliage, Desert Skies ('Palmgold').
