= Quercus gilliana =

Conservation status
- Least Concern (IUCN 3.1)

Scientific classification
- Kingdom: Plantae
- Clade: Embryophytes
- Clade: Tracheophytes
- Clade: Spermatophytes
- Clade: Angiosperms
- Clade: Eudicots
- Clade: Rosids
- Order: Fagales
- Family: Fagaceae
- Genus: Quercus
- Subgenus: Quercus subg. Cerris
- Section: Quercus sect. Ilex
- Species: Q. gilliana

Binomial name
- Quercus gilliana Rehder & E.H.Wilson

Species of flowering plant

Quercus gilliana is a species of oak. It is a shrub or small tree native to Tibet and to Gansu, Sichuan, and Yunnan provinces of western China. It grows up to ten metres tall on dry valley slopes and in pine forests, typically on limestone, from 1,300 to 3,450 metres elevation.

The species was described by Alfred Rehder and Ernest Henry Wilson in 1916.
