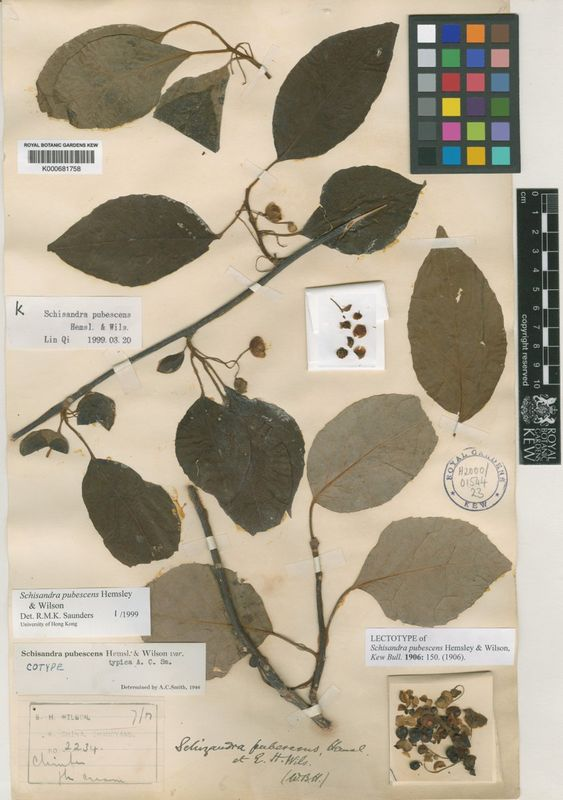

Scientific classification
- Kingdom: Plantae
- Clade: Embryophytes
- Clade: Tracheophytes
- Clade: Spermatophytes
- Clade: Angiosperms
- Order: Austrobaileyales
- Family: Schisandraceae
- Genus: Schisandra
- Species: S. pubescens

Binomial name
- Schisandra pubescens Hemsl. & E.H.Wilson

Synonyms
- Schisandra vestita Pax & K.Hoffm.

= Schisandra pubescens =

Species of flowering plant

Schisandra pubescens is a species of flowering plant in the family Schisandraceae. It is a climbing plant with papery leaves, cream, yellow, orange, or red flowers, and orange-red fruits. The species is native to China, and was described in 1906.

== Taxonomy ==
Schisandra pubescens was formally described in 1906, by William Botting Hemsley and Ernest Henry Wilson.

== Distribution ==
Schisandra pubescens is native to the temperate biome of Sichuan, Chongqing, and Hubei, south-central China. It grows at the margins of forests and shrubberies, in forests, and in thickets, at elevations of 1,000–1,900 metres (3,300–6,200 ft).

== Description ==
Schisandra pubescens is a climbing plant with angular purple stems. The leaf-bearing branches are elongated. The leaves are papery, elliptical to ovate, 7–11.5 centimetres (2.8–4.5 in) long, and 3.5–8.5 centimetres (1.4–3.3 in) wide. The leaf margins are toothed. The leaf stems are 1.5–4.3 centimetres (0.59–1.69 in) long.

The flowers are about 2 centimetres (0.79 in) across, and solitary. The stems of male flowers are 2–3 centimetres (0.79–1.18 in) long, and the stems of female flowers are 1.8–6.2 centimetres (0.71–2.44 in) long. The flowers have seven or eight tepals, which are cream, yellow, orange, or red. The largest tepals are 7–10 millimetres (0.28–0.39 in) long, and 6.5–10 millimetres (0.26–0.39 in) wide. The male flowers have fourteen to twenty-four stamens, and the female flowers have forty to sixty-two carpels. The plant flowers from May to July.

The fruit stems are 4–6 centimetres (1.6–2.4 in) long. The fruits are orange-red, and the carpels have one or two orange seeds. The plant fruits from June to September. The seed case is smooth. The seeds are 5–6.5 centimetres (2.0–2.6 in) long.

== Uses ==
Schisandra pubescens is used in medicine.

== Names ==
In Chinese, the species is known as 毛葉五味子 (mao ye wu wei zi).
