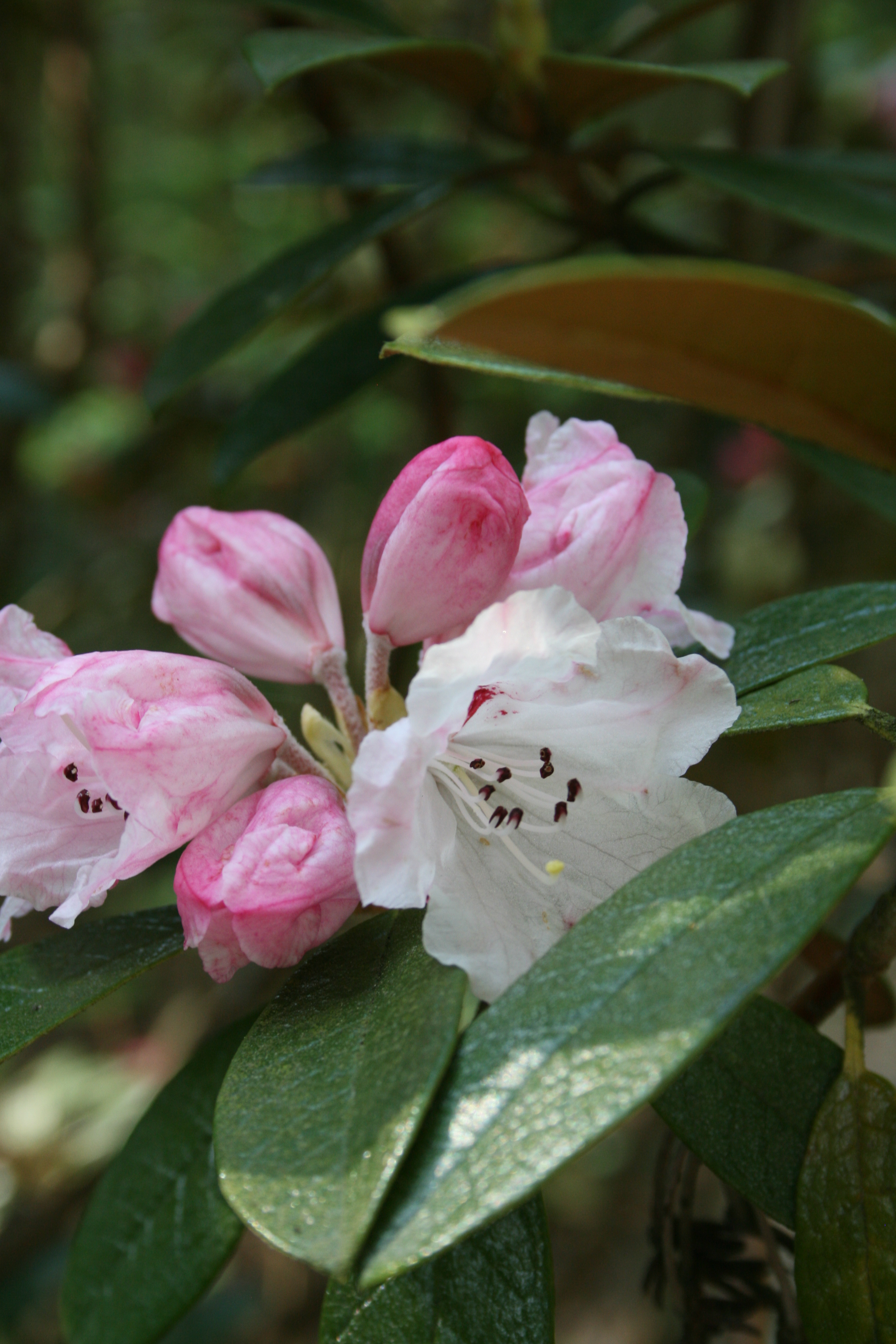

Scientific classification
- Kingdom: Plantae
- Clade: Embryophytes
- Clade: Tracheophytes
- Clade: Spermatophytes
- Clade: Angiosperms
- Clade: Eudicots
- Clade: Asterids
- Order: Ericales
- Family: Ericaceae
- Genus: Rhododendron
- Species: R. wiltonii

Binomial name
- Rhododendron wiltonii Hemsl. & E.H.Wilson

= Rhododendron wiltonii =

Species of flowering plant

Rhododendron wiltonii, called the Wilton rhododendron and the wrinkled-skin rhododendron, is a species of flowering plant in the genus Rhododendron native to south‑central China. It has gained the Royal Horticultural Society's Award of Garden Merit.
