= Ernest Wilson Memorial Garden =

Enclosed garden in Gloucestershire, England

Coordinates: 52°3′16.5″N 1°45′57.5″W

Ernest Wilson Memorial Garden is located at the north eastern edge of Chipping Campden in Gloucestershire, England, in an area of the High Street known as Leysbourne. The Ernest Wilson Memorial Garden is a small enclosed garden containing many different plants, in particular his study of Chinese and Japanese botanical specimens. The garden holds around 1,200 plants, most of which were introduced by Ernest Wilson himself.

The garden is open all year. Admission is free but donations are welcome using the donation box set in the wall at the entrance gate.
