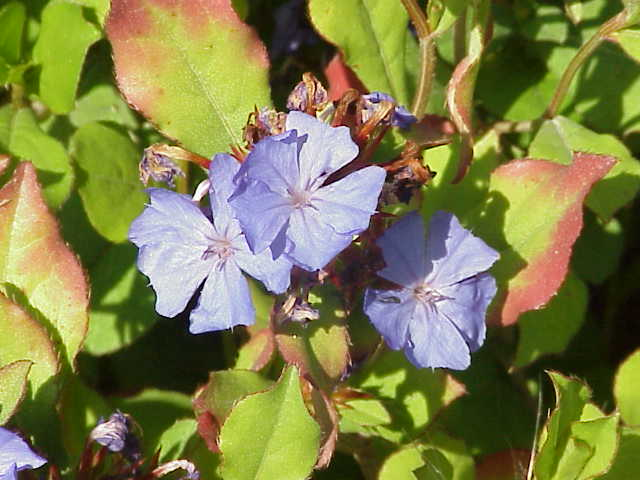
- Ceratostigma plumbaginoides

Scientific classification
- Kingdom: Plantae
- Clade: Tracheophytes
- Clade: Angiosperms
- Clade: Eudicots
- Order: Caryophyllales
- Family: Plumbaginaceae
- Genus: Ceratostigma; Bunge (1835)

Species
- See text

Synonyms
- Valoradia Hochst. (1841)

= Ceratostigma =

Genus of flowering plants

Ceratostigma (/ˌsɛrətoʊˈstɪɡmə, sɪˌræt-/;), or leadwort, plumbago, is a genus of eight species of flowering plants in the family Plumbaginaceae, native to warm temperate to tropical regions of Africa and Asia. Common names are shared with the genus Plumbago.

== Description ==
Ceratostigma species are flowering herbaceous plants, subshrubs, or small shrubs growing to 0.3–1 m (0.98–3.28 ft) tall. The leaves are spirally arranged, simple, 1–9 cm long, usually with a hairy margin. Some of the species are evergreen, others deciduous. The flowers are produced in a compact inflorescence, each flower with a five-lobed corolla; flower colour varies from pale to dark blue to red-purple. The fruit is a small bristly capsule containing a single seed.

== Species ==
Seven species are accepted.

- Ceratostigma abyssinicum (Hochst.) Schwein. & Asch.
- Ceratostigma asperrimum Stapf ex Prain
- Ceratostigma griffithii C.B.Clarke
- Ceratostigma minus Stapf ex Prain
- Ceratostigma plumbaginoides (Bunge)
- Ceratostigma ulicinum Prain
- Ceratostigma willmottianum Stapf

== Cultivation and uses ==
Plants of this genus are valued in the garden for their late summer flower colour and their autumn leaf colour. The following varieties have gained the Royal Horticultural Society's Award of Garden Merit (confirmed 2017):

- C. plumbaginoides
- C. willmottianum (Note: Named to honour Ellen Willmott.)
- C. willmottianum Forest Blue='Lice'
