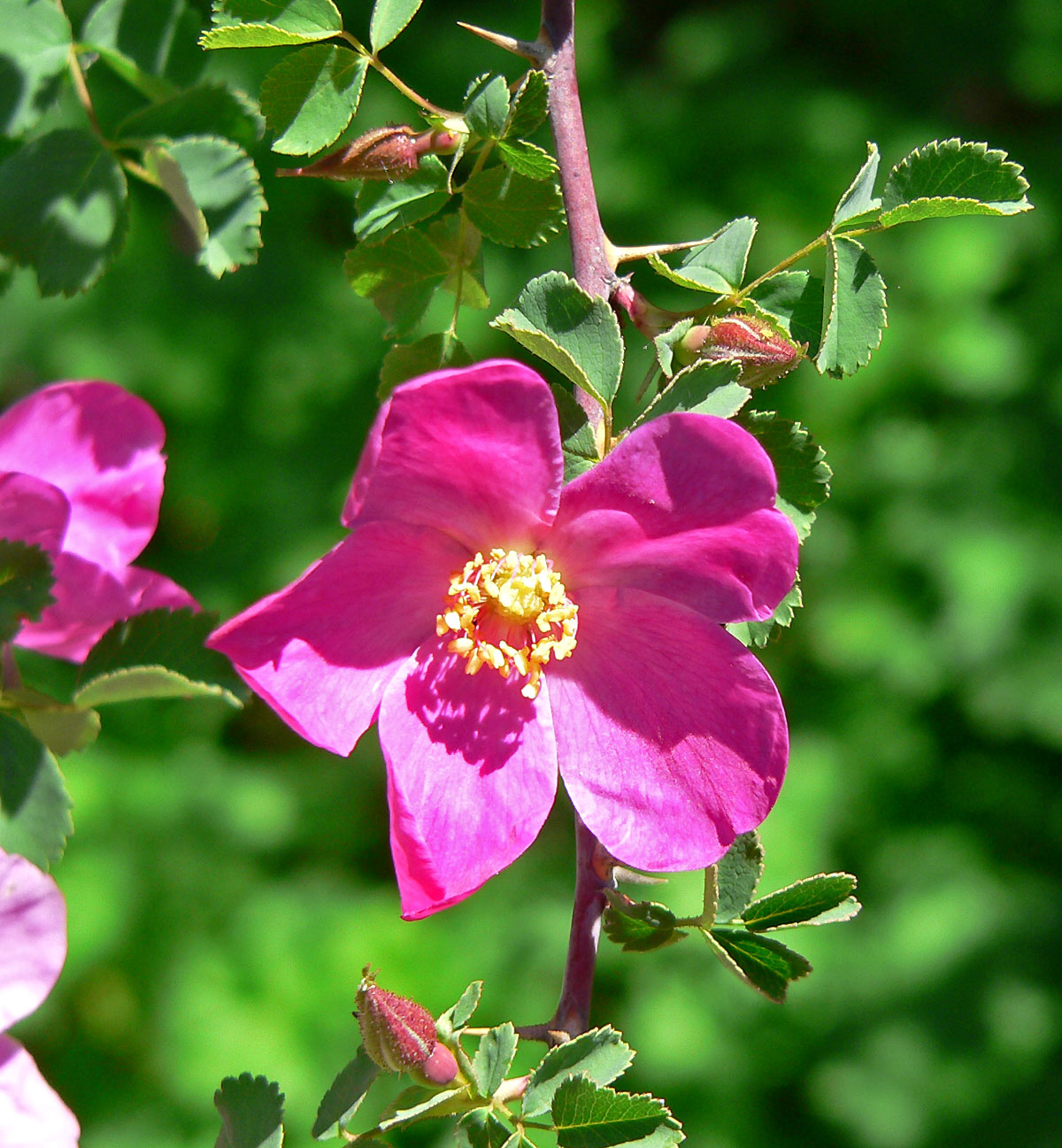

Scientific classification
- Kingdom: Plantae
- Clade: Tracheophytes
- Clade: Angiosperms
- Clade: Eudicots
- Clade: Rosids
- Order: Rosales
- Family: Rosaceae
- Genus: Rosa
- Species: R. willmottiae

Binomial name
- Rosa willmottiae Hemsl.

Synonyms
- Rosa gymnocarpa var. willmottiae (Hemsl.) P.V.Heath

= Rosa willmottiae =

Species of flowering plant

Rosa willmottiae, Miss Willmott's rose or Willmott's rose, is a species of flowering plant in the family Rosaceae. It grows at an altitude of 2,300–3,150 metres (7,550–10,330 ft) in dry valleys in western Sichuan, China. It forms an arching deciduous shrub 2–3 m (6 ft 7 in – 9 ft 10 in) high, and as much across. The branches are covered in many straight prickles. The pinnate leaves typically have 7 to 9 small bluish-green leaflets which emit a pleasant fragrance when bruised. It was introduced to western cultivation by Ernest Wilson in 1904 and was named after the collector and horticulturist Ellen Willmott. The flowers are small (25–40 millimetres or 1.0–1.6 inches), lilac-pink, and are borne on short laterals all along the length of the branches in late spring/early summer. The hips are small, becoming orange-red and losing their tips when ripe.

Charles & Bridget Quest-Ritson describe Rosa willmottiae as "one of the few wild roses that merits a place in a mixed border or even as a specimen shrub" and that when in flower it is "the embodiment of beauty".
