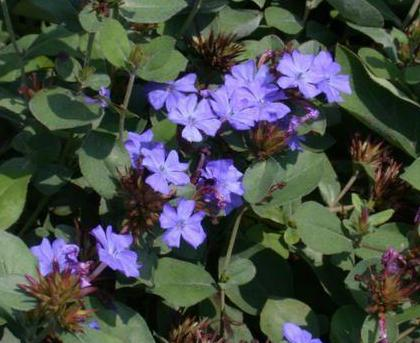

Scientific classification
- Kingdom: Plantae
- Clade: Tracheophytes
- Clade: Angiosperms
- Clade: Eudicots
- Order: Caryophyllales
- Family: Plumbaginaceae
- Genus: Ceratostigma
- Species: C. plumbaginoides

Binomial name
- Ceratostigma plumbaginoides Bunge

= Ceratostigma plumbaginoides =

Species of flowering plant

Ceratostigma plumbaginoides, the hardy blue-flowered leadwort, is a species of flowering plant in the plumbago family, native to China, where it is known as 蓝雪花 (pinyin: lánxuěhuā; lit. 'blue snow-flower').

== Description ==
Growing to 50 cm (20 in) tall and broad, it is a mat-forming herbaceous perennial with small ovoid leaves and bright blue flowers in late summer and early autumn. The leaves may turn red or purple before falling.

== Distribution ==
Ceratostigma plumbaginoides is native to eastern China, specifically Beijing and the provinces of Henan, Jiangsu, Shanxi and Zhejiang. It is usually found in rocky places, often in foothills.

== Scientific name ==
Ceratostigma is derived from Greek, meaning 'horned stigma'. This is in reference to the 'shape of the stigmatic surface'. The Latin specific epithet plumbaginoides signifies its resemblance to plants in the closely related genus Plumbago.

== Cultivation ==
Ceratostigma plumbaginoides is grown as an ornamental plant in temperate climates, valued for its late season colour. It is hardy down to −10 °C (14 °F), but prefers a sunny, sheltered position in moist, well-drained soil. As it can become invasive, it is particularly suited to growing in a pot, or crevices in a dry stone wall. It has gained the Royal Horticultural Society's Award of Garden Merit.
