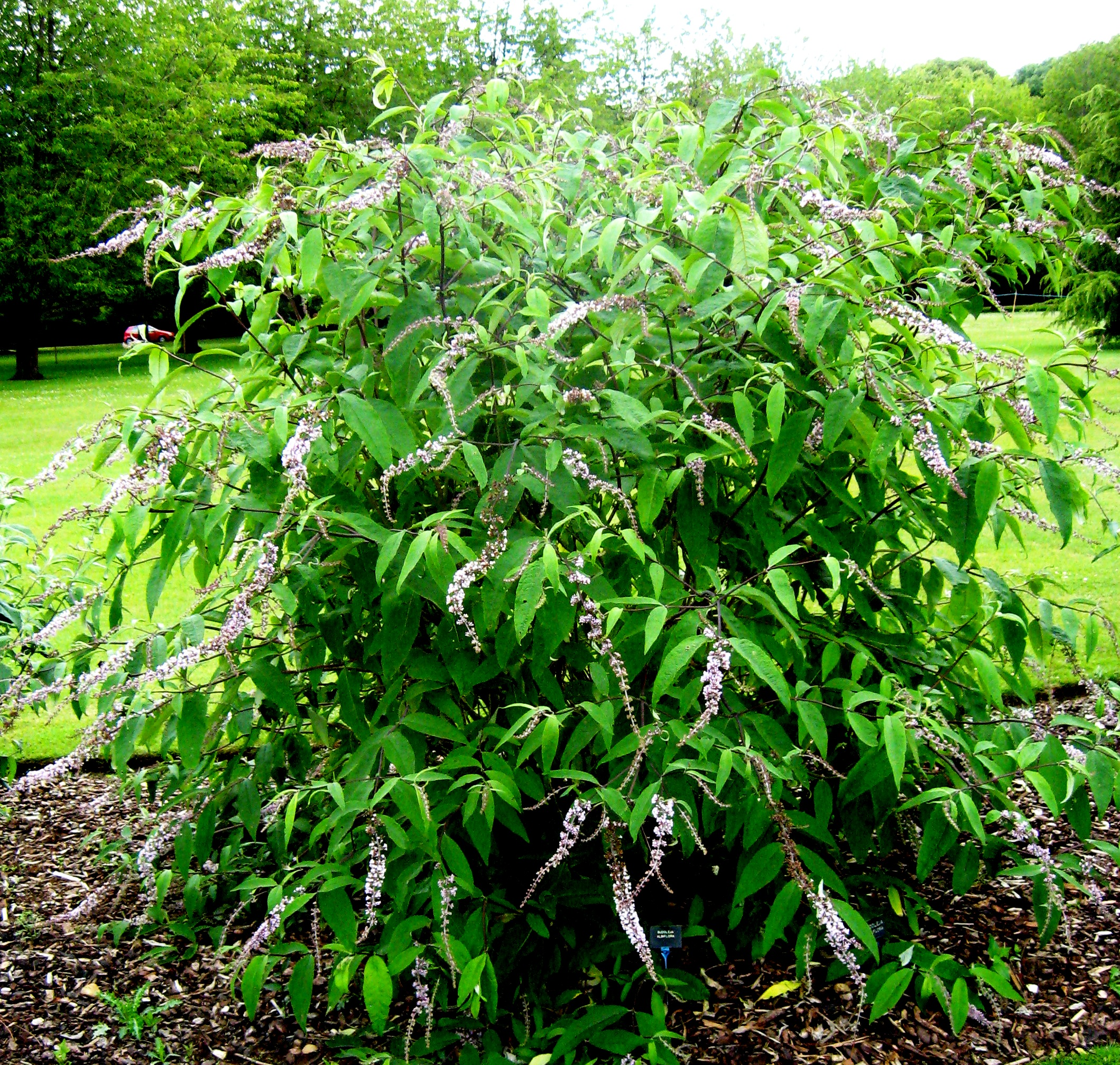
- Buddleja albiflora, Longstock Park Nursery, Hampshire

Scientific classification
- Kingdom: Plantae
- Clade: Tracheophytes
- Clade: Angiosperms
- Clade: Eudicots
- Clade: Asterids
- Order: Lamiales
- Family: Scrophulariaceae
- Genus: Buddleja
- Species: B. albiflora

Binomial name
- Buddleja albiflora Hemsl.

Synonyms
- Buddleja albiflora var. giraldii (Diels) Rehder et E. H. Wilson; Buddleja albiflora var. hemsleyana (Koehne) Schneider; Buddleja giraldii Diels; Buddleja hemsleyana Koehne

= Buddleja albiflora =

Species of plant

Buddleja albiflora is a deciduous shrub in the family Scrophulariaceae. It is native to the mountains of central China, where it grows on shrub-clad slopes at altitudes of between 1,000 and 2,000 m. Named rather carelessly by Hemsley, the species was discovered by Henry, and introduced to western cultivation by Wilson in 1900.

== Description ==
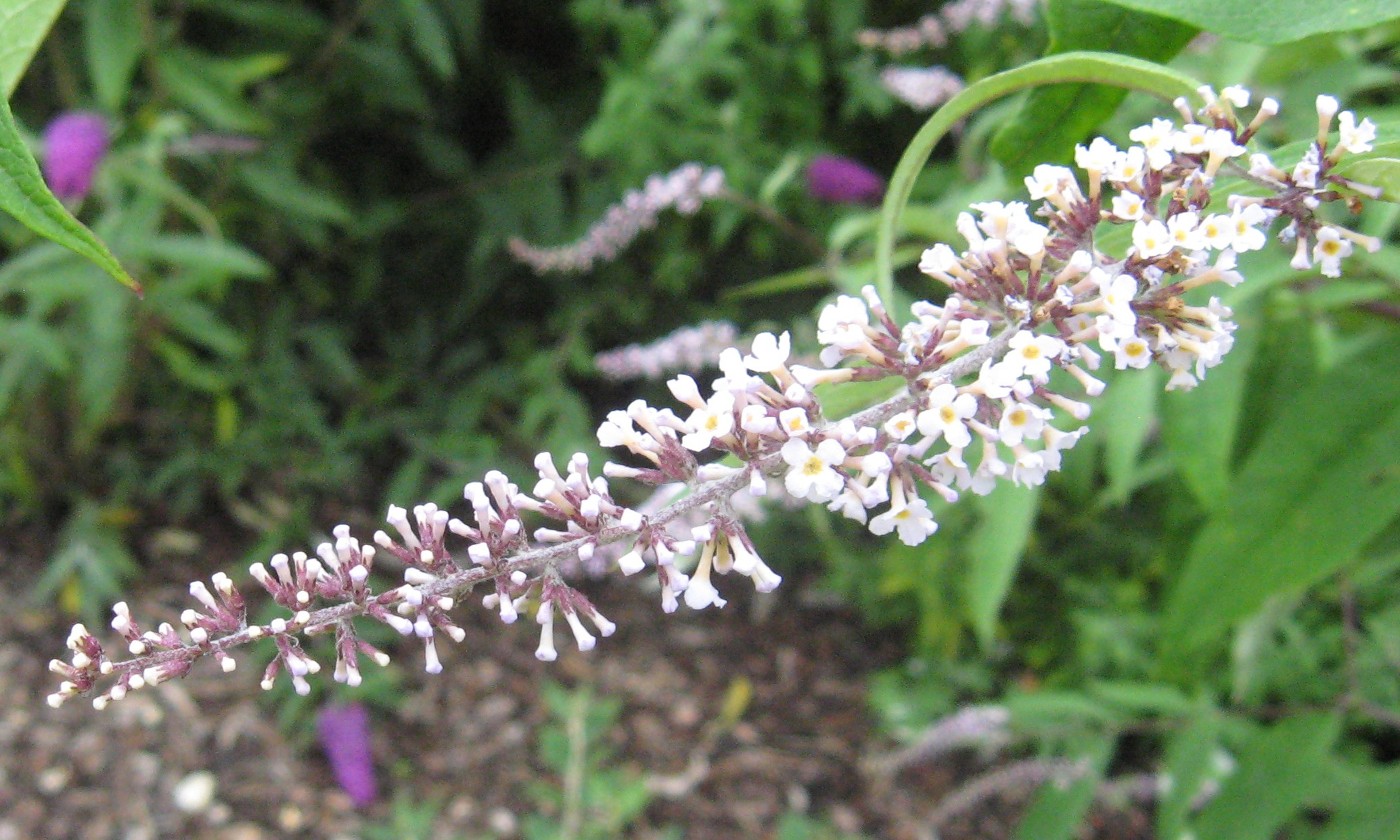
B. albiflora panicle

Buddleja albiflora grows to a height of 4 m in the wild, the branches erect and glabrous. The leaves are narrow lanceolate, with a long-tapered point and wedge-shaped base, 10–22 cm long by 1–6 cm wide, toothed and dark-green, glabrous above in maturity, but covered beneath with a fine silvery-grey felt. The shrub is similar to B. davidii, but has rounded stems, as opposed to the four-angled of the latter. Despite its specific name, the fragrant flowers are actually pale lilac with orange centres, borne as slender panicles 20–45 cm long by 5 cm wide at the base; they are considered inferior to those of B. davidii and thus the plant is comparatively rare in cultivation. B. albiflora is hexaploid: 2n = 114.

== Cultivation ==
The shrub is fully hardy in the UK, and features in the NCCPG National Collection of Buddleja held by the Longstock Park Nursery, near Stockbridge.

Hardiness: USDA zones 6–9.
