= Warley Place =

Nature reserve in Brentwood, Essex, England

Coordinates: 51°35′45″N 00°17′06″E

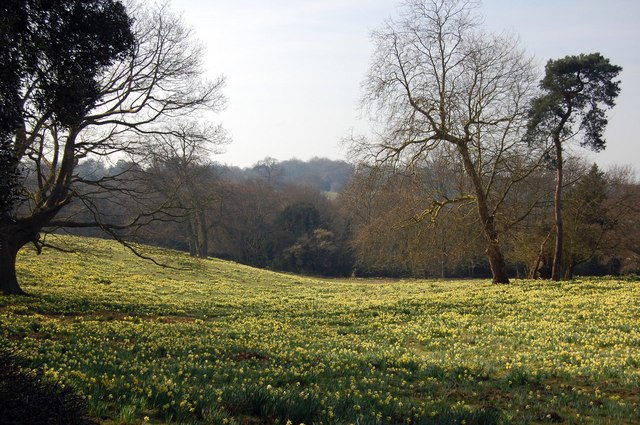
- Interactive map of Warley Place
- Type: Nature reserve
- Location: Brentwood, Essex
- OS grid: TQ 583 906
- Area: 10.1 hectares (25 acres)
- Manager: Essex Wildlife Trust

Warley Place is a 10.1-hectare (25-acre) nature reserve south of Brentwood in Great Warley, Essex. It is managed by the Essex Wildlife Trust and the former garden structures are Grade II listed. The now demolished house was home to renowned horticulturalist Ellen Willmott. There is access next to the Thatchers Arms pub at the junction of Warley Road and Dark Lane.

== History of Warley Park ==
At the time of the dissolution of the monasteries in the 16th century, the land at Warley Park was part of a larger estate that came into the ownership of the Gonson family. In 1627, the estate was split between four daughters as part of an inheritance, with the title of the manor of Great Warley going to Sir Richard Browne, the son of Thomasine, one of the daughters. Warley Place, which had been built in the early part of the 17th century was inherited by the Flemings, the heirs of another of the sisters. The estate would pass through several owners, with Thomas Adams commissioned James Gandon to remodel the hall in 1777, which was exhibited at the Royal Academy but the work was never undertaken. It was not until 1840 that the house was modernised. In 1875, the property was bought by Frederick Willmott, whose daughter Ellen Willmott was 18 at the time. The family greatly expanded the property and started developing the garden.

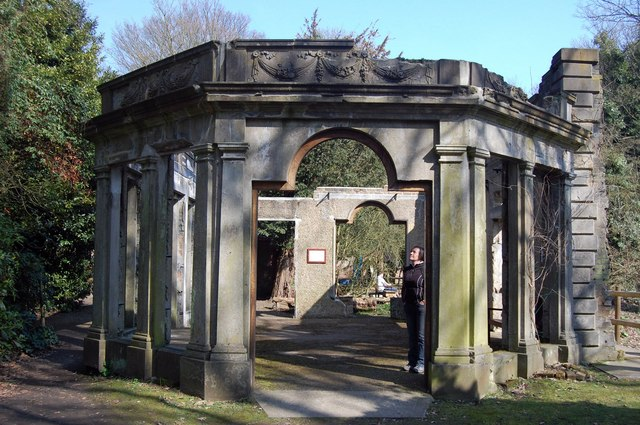
The ruins of the former Conservatory, which was added by the Willmott family

At the age of 21, Ellen started building the Alpine garden. The 1.2 hectare garden contained a ravine that was 65 metres long, and contained a mountain stream and ponds. She could afford such investment, as she had received from her father £1,000 on every birthday. Ellen was described by Gertrude Jekyll as "the greatest living gardener", continued to invest in the garden. After her parents died, Ellen inherited the property but continued to spend more money than she had. After the First World War, Ellen sold off the outlying areas of the estate, but upon her death the property was sold by auction to clear her debts. There had been talk of the garden becoming a branch of Kew Gardens but it never materialised. Upon her death, many of her plants from the garden were dug up by trespassers. The property and garden went through several owners, until in 1938, Mr A J T Carter purchased the property and planned to develop the site for housing. The house was demolished in 1939, but the plans for the development was blocked by the Green Belt legislation of 1938. The site remained derelict until Carter's son, Norman and his son Paul, leased the site to the Essex Wildlife Trust in 1977 and helped to uncover the structure.

== The garden ==
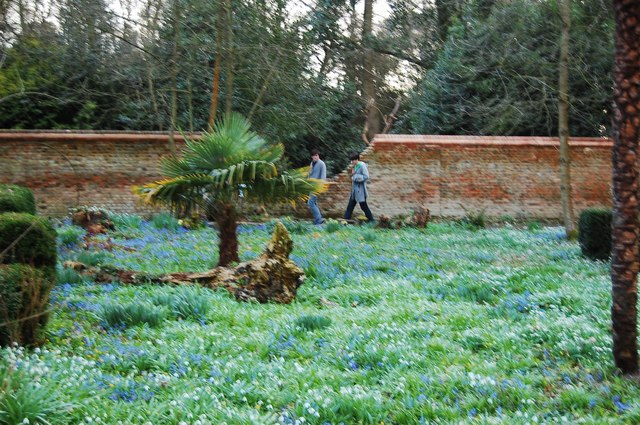
Inside the Walled Garden

The garden is currently on the Historic England at risk list, as numerous ruinous structures surviving from Willmott's garden remain in need of urgent repairs. Other than the Alpine Ravine, the garden, there was:

- a boating lake
- a bog garden
- a rose garden
- pergolas
- at least eight gazebos
- a wild garden inspired by William Robinson
- a labyrinth of hothouse
- a grotto
- a winding rockery
- a woodland walk
- herbaceous borders
- a walled garden
- trial beds
