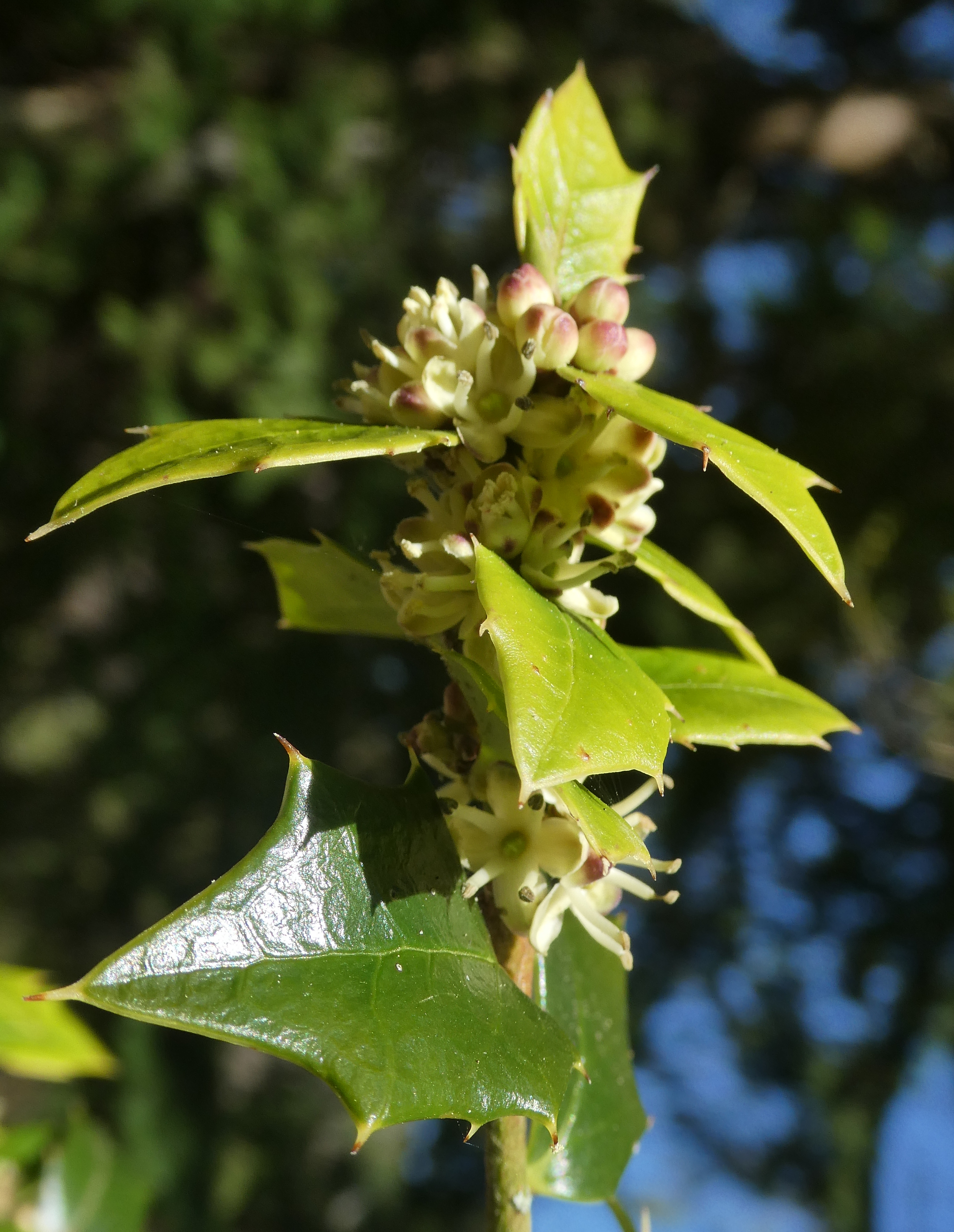

Scientific classification
- Kingdom: Plantae
- Clade: Tracheophytes
- Clade: Angiosperms
- Clade: Eudicots
- Clade: Asterids
- Order: Aquifoliales
- Family: Aquifoliaceae
- Genus: Ilex
- Species: I. pernyi

Binomial name
- Ilex pernyi Franch.

= Ilex pernyi =

Species of holly

Ilex pernyi (Perny's holly) is a species in the Ilex (holly) genus and the family Aquifoliaceae. It was discovered by the French Jesuit missionary and botanist Paul-Hubert Perny and named after him by Adrien René Franchet.

This evergreen shrub or small tree growing to 10–15 m tall occurs in central and south-west of China, specifically in Anhui, Gansu, Guizhou, Shaanxi, Sichuan, and Yunnan. The leaves are smaller than those of most other hollies, 1.5–3 cm long, diamond-shaped, with five (occasionally three or seven) sharp spines on the margins. The small flowers are yellow, and berries on the female plants are red. It is widespread, and currently considered to be of least concern.

It is occasionally cultivated as an ornamental tree in western Europe.
