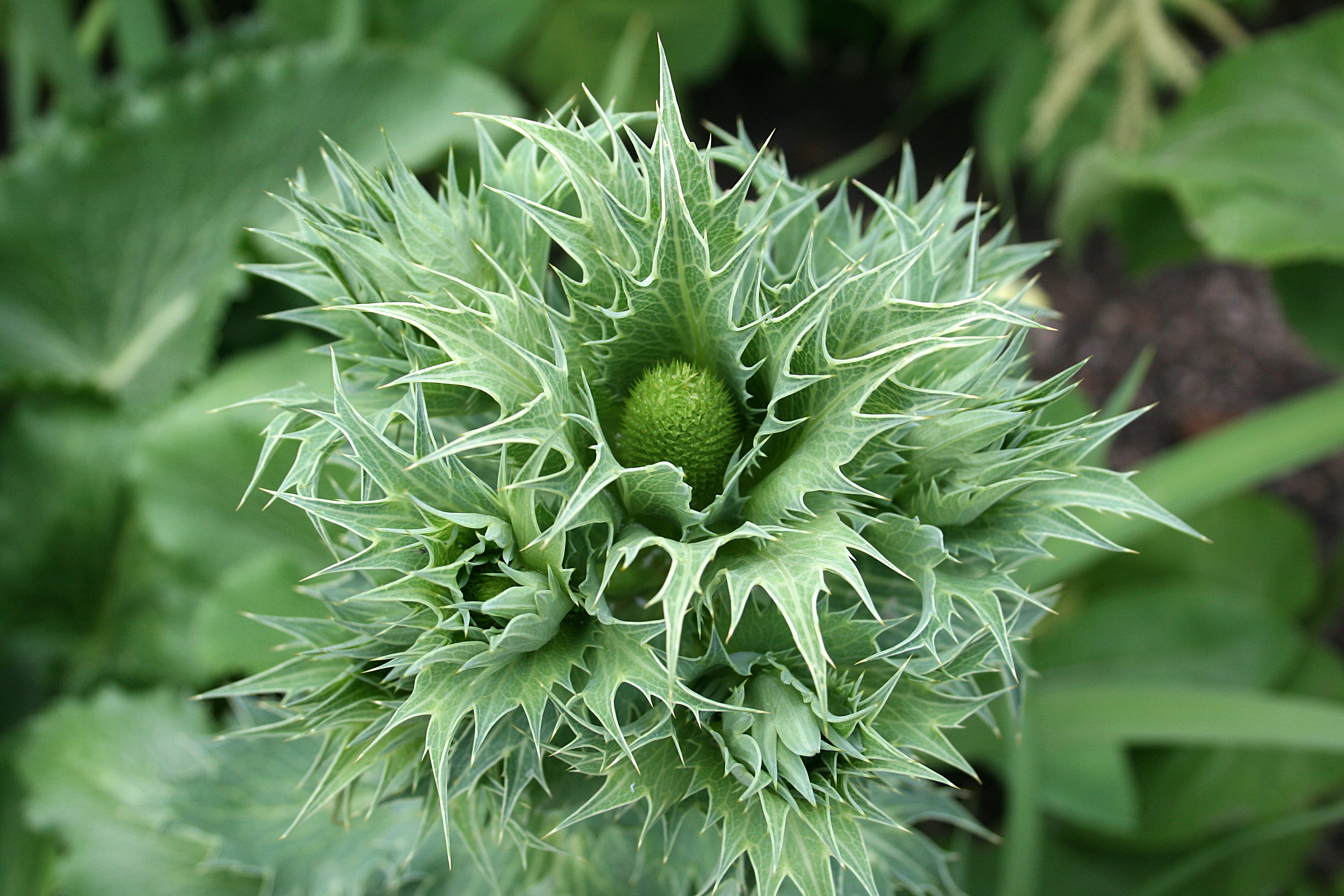

Scientific classification
- Kingdom: Plantae
- Clade: Tracheophytes
- Clade: Angiosperms
- Clade: Eudicots
- Clade: Asterids
- Order: Apiales
- Family: Apiaceae
- Genus: Eryngium
- Species: E. giganteum

Binomial name
- Eryngium giganteum L.

= Eryngium giganteum =

Species of flowering plant in the celery family

Eryngium giganteum, with the common name Miss Willmott's ghost, is a species of flowering plant in the family Apiaceae.

The short-lived herbaceous perennial thistle is native to the Caucasus and Iran in Western Asia.

== Description ==
Eryngium giganteum grows to 1 m (3 ft 3 in). It produces branched heads of pale green conical flowerheads surrounded by spiny bracts in summer. The flowers turn blue at maturity. It usually dies after flowering and is therefore normally grown as a biennial.

== Cultivation ==
It is cultivated as an ornamental plant for use in gardens. Both the species and its cultivar 'Silver Ghost' have gained the Royal Horticultural Society's Award of Garden Merit.

The common name refers to Ellen Willmott, who is said to have carried seeds at all times, planting them in the gardens of fellow horticulturalists.

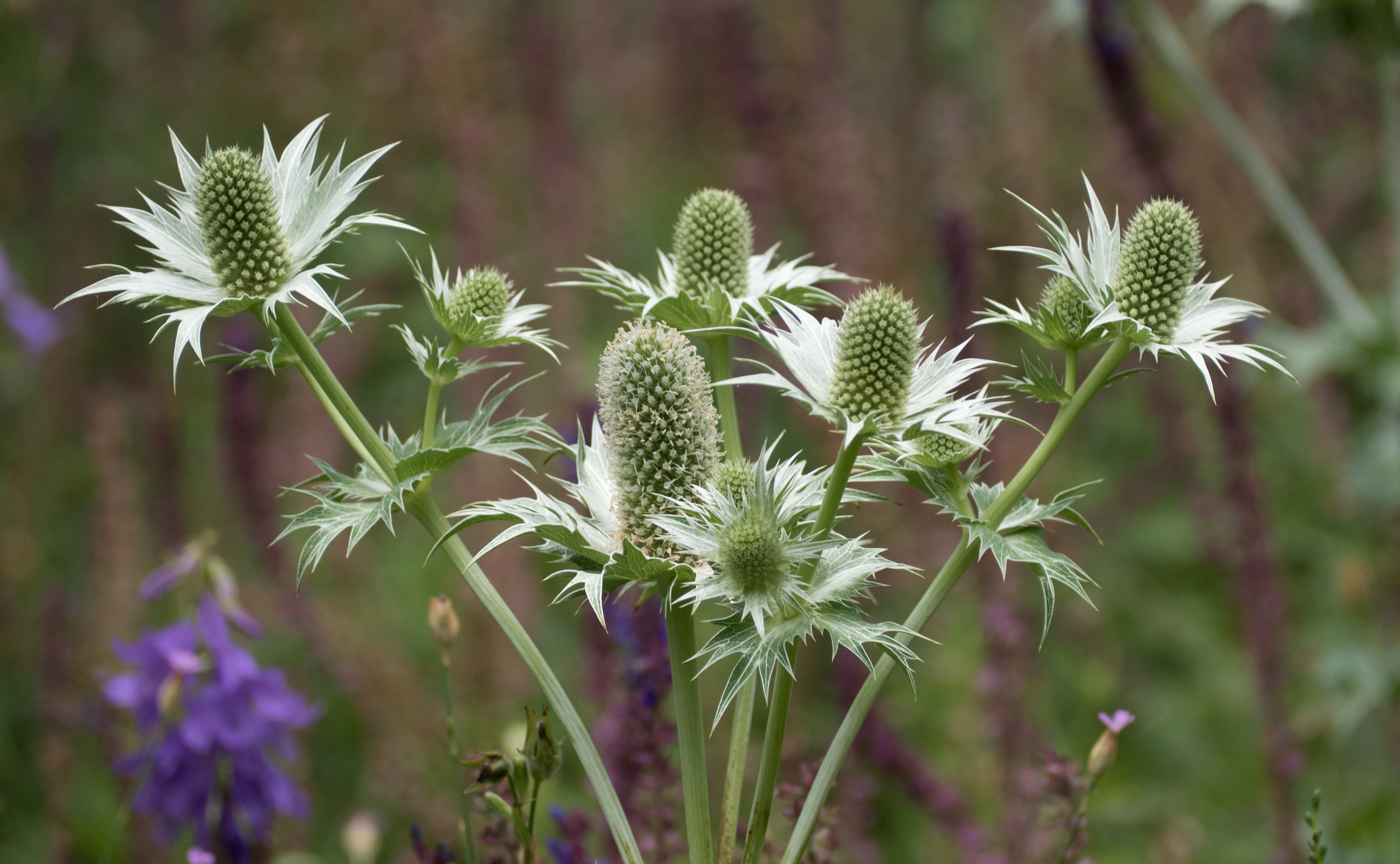
New York Botanical Garden

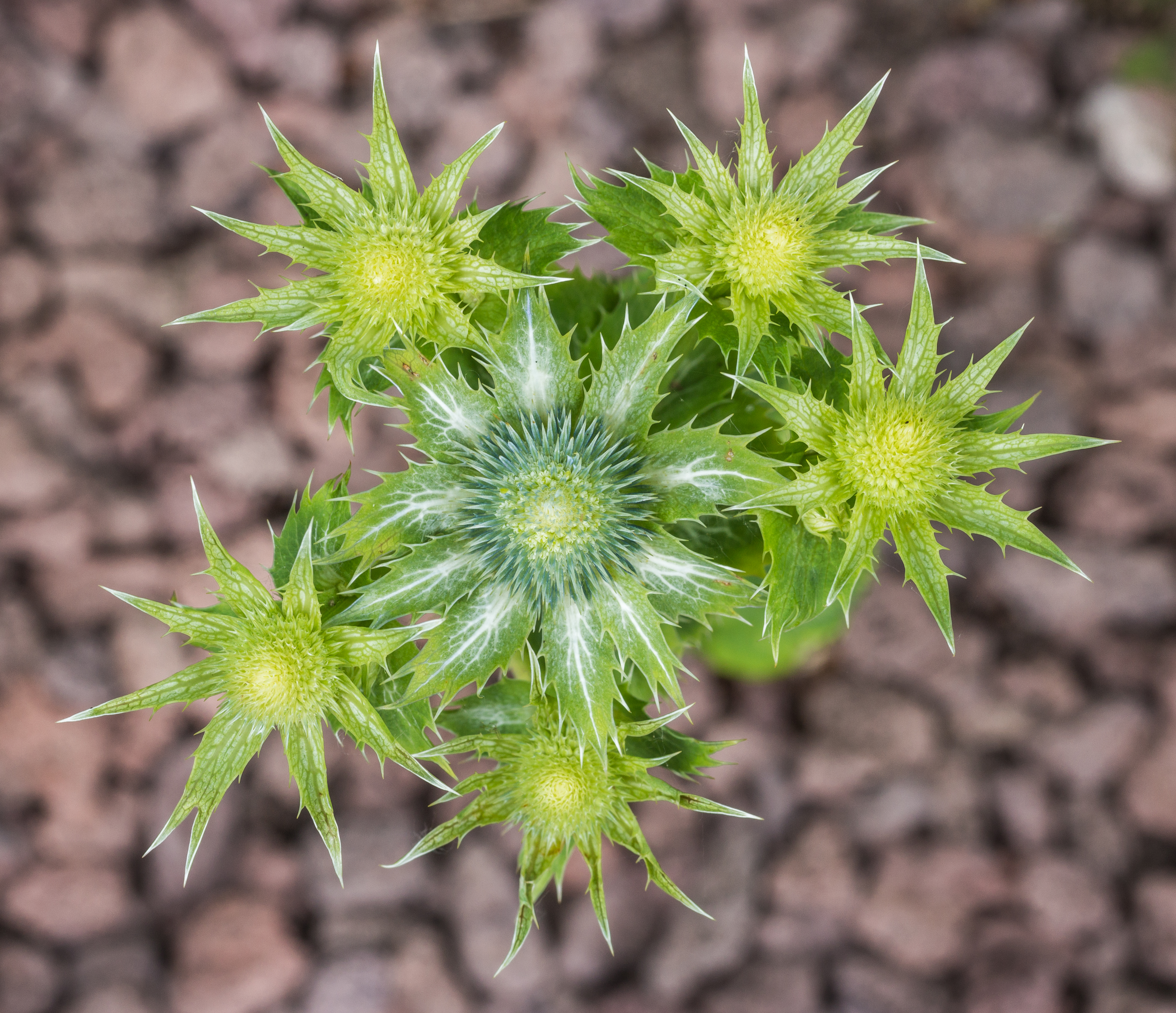

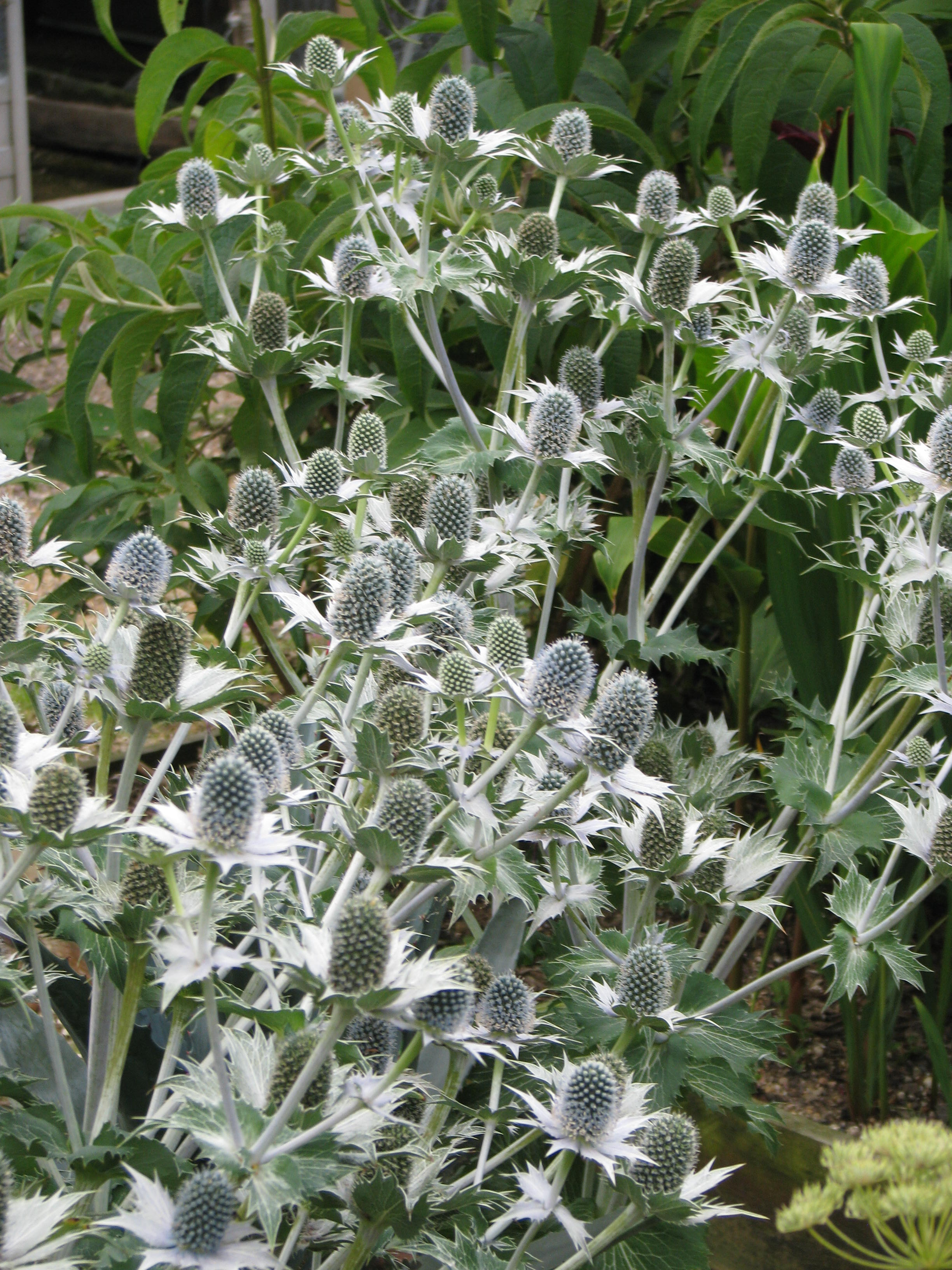
