= Ellen Willmott =

English horticulturist (1858–1934)

Ellen Ann Willmott FLS VMH
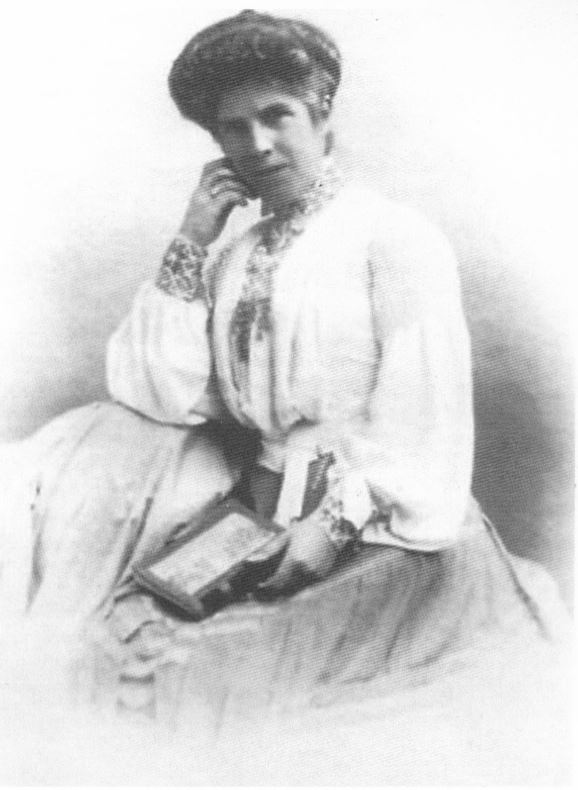
- Willmott in 1907
- Born: Ellen Ann Willmott; 19 August 1858; Heston, Middlesex, UK
- Died: 27 September 1934 (aged 76)
- Resting place: Brentwood Cathedral
- Occupation: Horticulturist

Ellen Ann Willmott FLS VMH (19 August 1858 – 27 September 1934) was an English horticulturist. She was an influential member of the Royal Horticultural Society, and a recipient of the first Victoria Medal of Honour, awarded to British horticulturists living in the UK by the society, in 1897. Willmott was said to have cultivated more than 100,000 species and cultivars of plants and sponsored expeditions to discover new species. Inherited wealth allowed Willmott to buy large gardens in France and Italy to add to the garden at her home, Warley Place in Essex. More than 60 plants have been named after her or her home, Warley Place.

== Early life ==
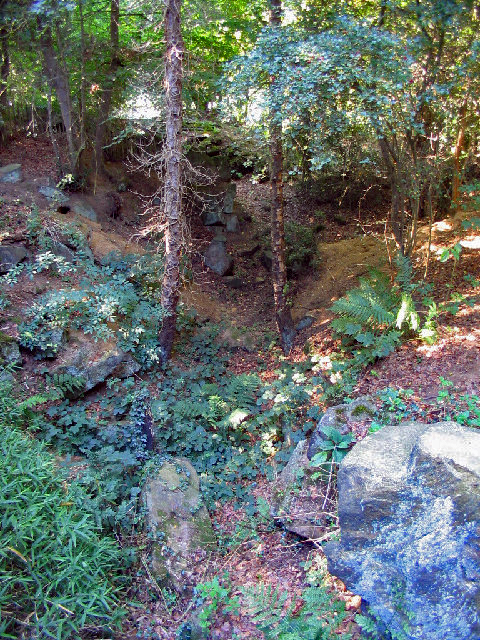
Man-made gorge at Warley Place

Ellen Willmott was born on 19 August 1858 in Heston, Middlesex, the eldest of three daughters of Frederick Willmott (1825–1892), a solicitor, and Ellen Willmott (née Fell) (died 1898). Through her mother she was related to the Tasker family, prominent Roman Catholics. She and her two sisters, Rose and Ada (died 1872), attended the exclusive Catholic convent school Gumley House for several years.

In 1875, the family moved to Warley Place at Great Warley, Essex, which had 33 acres (130,000 m^{2}) of grounds; this was to be Ellen's lifelong home. The family were keen gardeners and developed Warley Place's gardens together. One of the most ambitious developments was an alpine garden, including a gorge and rockery, which Ellen's father gave her permission to create on her 21st birthday.

Willmott received a substantial inheritance from her godmother, another keen gardener, Countess Helen Tasker of Middleton Hall, Brentwood, who died in 1888. This enabled her to buy her first property near Aix-les-Bains, France, in 1890.

== Horticultural career ==
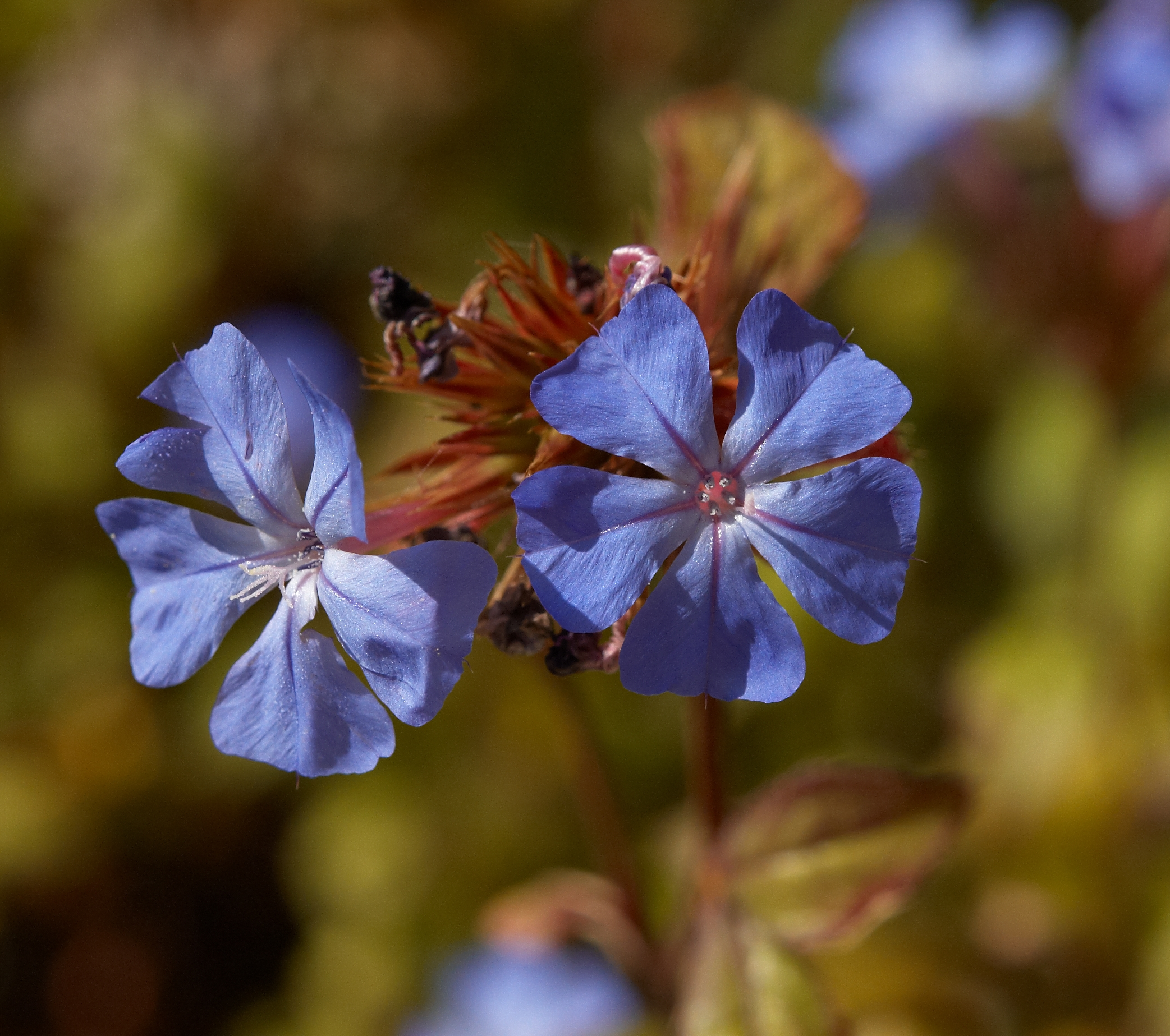
Ceratostigma willmottianum, one of over 60 species named after Ellen Willmott or Warley Place.

Willmott inherited Warley Place on her father's death and continued to develop the gardens, indulging her passion for collecting and cultivating plants. She is thought to have cultivated more than 100,000 different plant species and cultivars. The garden included a conservatory, glasshouses, an irrigation system, a rock garden partly designed as an alpine gorge, a boating lake and a glass-covered cave for filmy ferns. Willmott had tens of thousands of bulbs planted to form naturalistic drifts of blossom when they flowered.

Willmott employed up to 104 gardeners, and was known for being a demanding employer; she would reputedly sack any gardener who allowed a weed to grow among her flowers. She only employed men in her garden; she was once quoted as saying "women would be a disaster in the border".

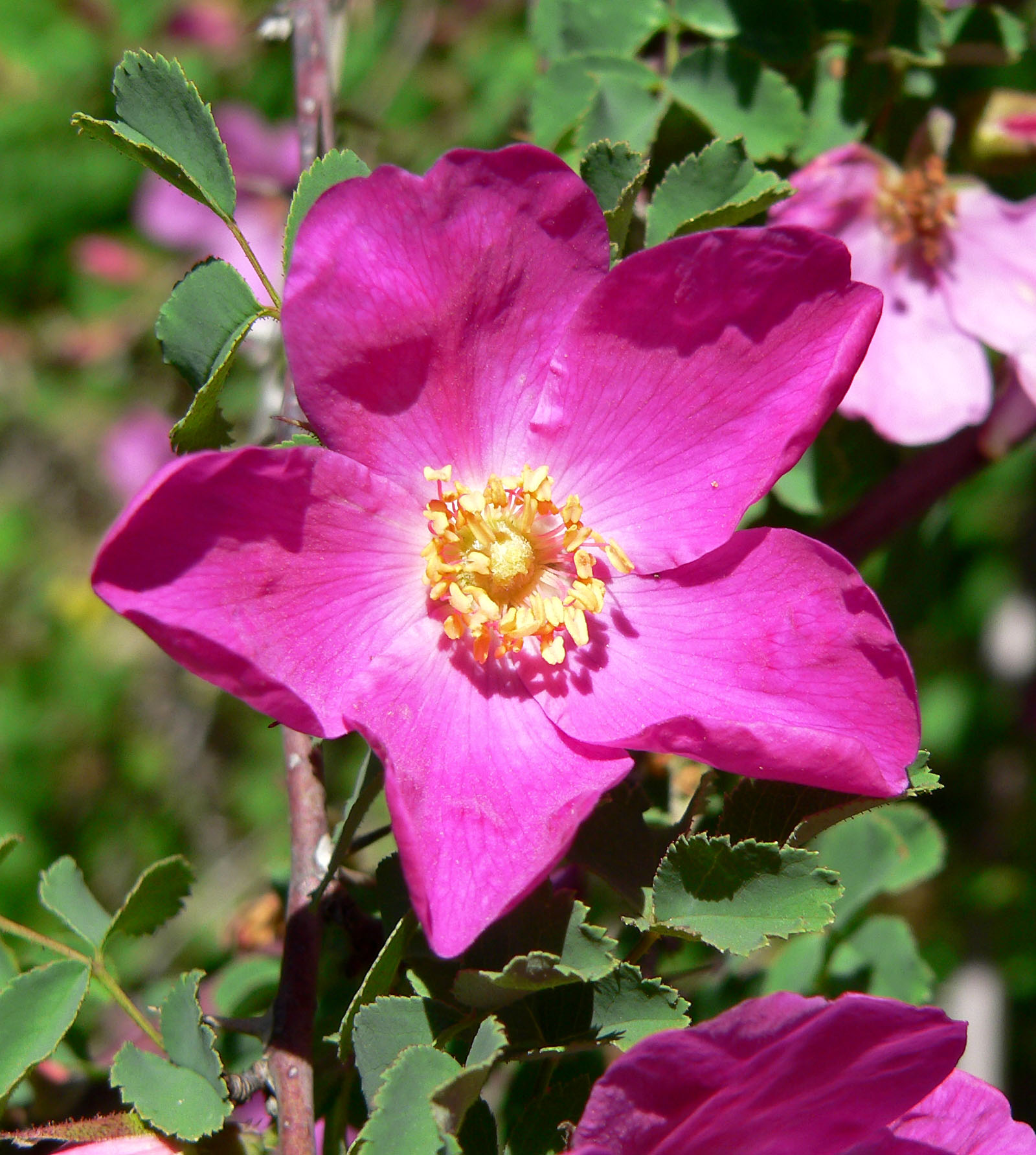
Rosa willmottiae

Willmott was also known for being a prodigious spender. In 1905 she bought a third estate in Ventimiglia, Italy. Willmott used her wealth to fund plant-hunting expeditions to China and the Middle East, and species discovered on these excursions would often be named after her. The expeditions she sponsored included those of Ernest Henry Wilson, who named Ceratostigma willmottianum, Rosa willmottiae and Corylopsis willmottiae after her. Over fifty plant species or varieties were named for her and her gardens.

It has been claimed that she secretly sowed seeds of the giant prickly thistle Eryngium giganteum in other people's gardens, leading to it to be colloquially known as 'Miss Willmott's Ghost': this story first appeared in the 1980s and has been debunked, most recently in a 2022 book by Sandra Lawrence.

Willmott joined the Royal Horticultural Society in 1894 and became a prominent member, elected to the narcissus and tulip committee in 1896, as well as floral (group B) and lily committees. She helped to persuade Sir Thomas Hanbury, her neighbour at Ventimiglia, to purchase the site at Wisley which became the RHS Garden, Wisley and donate it to the society, and was appointed a trustee of the RHS Gardens in 1903.

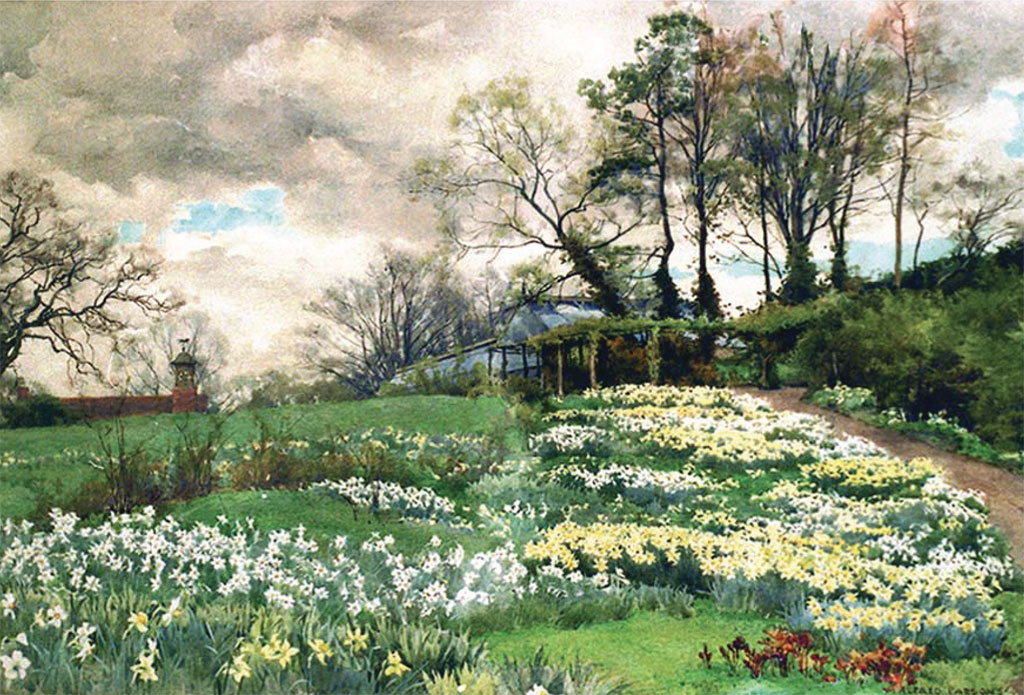
Watercolour of Willmott's garden by Alfred Parsons (private collection)

Willmott was one of only two women, alongside Gertrude Jekyll, to receive the Victoria Medal of Honour in 1897 (newly instituted that year for Queen Victoria’s Diamond Jubilee). In 1904 she became one of the first women to be elected a fellow of the Linnean Society of London. She also received the grande médaille Geoffroi St Hilaire from the Société d’acclimatation de France in 1912, and the Dean Hole medal from the Royal National Rose Society in 1914.

In the 1920s, Willmott was commissioned by the Shakespeare Birthplace Trust to advise on garden design and planting at Anne Hathaway's cottage garden at Stratford upon Avon. Her designs for the flower garden and orchard were intended to complement the old buildings, and much of her layout and plant choices are in place today, including the three flower beds near the cottage entrance, named Miss Willmott's garden. Many of the plants chosen were mentioned in Shakespeare's plays. This combination created borders that were colourful throughout the year.

She published two books; Warley Garden in Spring and Summer in 1909 and The Genus Rosa, published in two volumes between 1910 and 1914. This included 132 watercolours of roses painted by Alfred Parsons between 1890 and 1908, which are now held by the Lindley Library in London (Cory Bequest). The book only sold 260 copies, leaving her in debt. Willmott also commissioned Parsons to paint her three gardens. Queen Mary, Queen Alexandra (to whom The Genus Rosa was dedicated) and Princess Victoria are known to have visited her at Warley Place. In 1914 she initiated a bitter public spat with the horticulturalist E.A. Bowles about some observations on rock gardens made by Reginald Farrer in his foreword to one of Bowles' books. Bowles eventually patched up the row by inviting Willmott to his garden at Myddelton House.

== Other interests ==
In addition to her career in horticulture, Willmott also had other, lesser known accomplishments in particular photography and ornamental turning. In 1932, Willmott presented her Holtzapffel lathe, some examples of her ornamental turning work, and a number of photographs and slides of horticultural subjects to the History of Science Museum, Oxford.

== Later life ==
Willmott's prodigious spending during her lifetime caused financial difficulties in later life, forcing her to sell her French and Italian properties, and eventually her personal possessions. She became increasingly eccentric and paranoid: she booby-trapped her estate to deter thieves, and carried a revolver in her handbag. Willmott was arrested on suspicion of shoplifting in 1928, although later acquitted.

Willmott died of atheroma and embolus of the coronary artery in 1934, aged 76. Warley Place, which had greatly deteriorated, was sold to pay her debts and the house was demolished in 1939, although plans to develop a housing estate on the site were rejected. It was later designated as a green belt and 6.5 ha (16 acres) became a nature reserve overseen by the Essex Wildlife Trust. The remainder is in the care of the Warley Place Management Committee and maintained as an abandoned garden.

== See also ==
- Timeline of women in science
