= Ernest Henry Wilson =

British plant collector and explorer (1876–1930)

- Born: 15 February 1876; Chipping Campden, Gloucestershire, England
- Died: 15 October 1930 (aged 54); Worcester, Massachusetts, US
- Other name: "Chinese" Wilson
- Education: Birmingham Municipal Technical School
- Occupation: Plant collector
- Awards: Veitch Memorial Medal (1906)

Ernest Henry "Chinese" Wilson (15 February 1876 – 15 October 1930), better known as E. H. Wilson, was an English plant collector and explorer who introduced a large range of about 2,000 Asian plant species to the West; some sixty bear his name.

== Career ==
Wilson was born in Chipping Campden, Gloucestershire but the family soon moved to Shirley, Warwickshire, where they set up a floristry business. He left school early for employment at the local nursery of Messrs. Hewitt, Warwickshire, as apprentice gardener, and, aged 16, at the Birmingham Botanical Gardens; there he also studied at Birmingham Municipal Technical School in the evenings, receiving the Queen's Prize for botany. In 1897 he began work at the Royal Botanic Gardens, Kew, where he won the Hooker Prize for an essay on conifers. He then accepted a position as Chinese plant collector with the firm of James Veitch & Sons, who were eager above all to retrieve the dove tree, Davidia involucrata. "Stick to the one thing you are after," advised Harry Veitch, who had more than a dozen plant hunters on payroll, "and don't spend time and money wandering about. Probably every worthwhile plant in China has now been introduced to Europe."

After six months at Veitch's Coombe Woods Nursery, Wilson travelled west towards China, stopping for five days at the Arnold Arboretum in Boston, Massachusetts, where he carried a letter of introduction to Charles Sprague Sargent and studied techniques for shipping seeds and plants without damage. He continued across the US by train, and sailed from San Francisco, reaching Hong Kong on 3 June 1899. Sargent had suggested he head straight to Simao to talk to Augustine Henry, who had seen a unique dove tree twelve years previously. Though the tree had been recently cut down when Wilson reached it, he rediscovered the specimens noticed by Père David 600 km away in Yichang, Hubei. Wilson collected for two years in Hubei Province, reaching isolated mountain valleys with an intrepid spirit that has made him legendary, before returning to England in April 1902 with seed of 305 species, and 35 Wardian cases of bulbs, corms, rhizomes, and tubers, many of which Veitch introduced into Western commerce, as well as dried herbarium specimens, representing some 906 plant species.

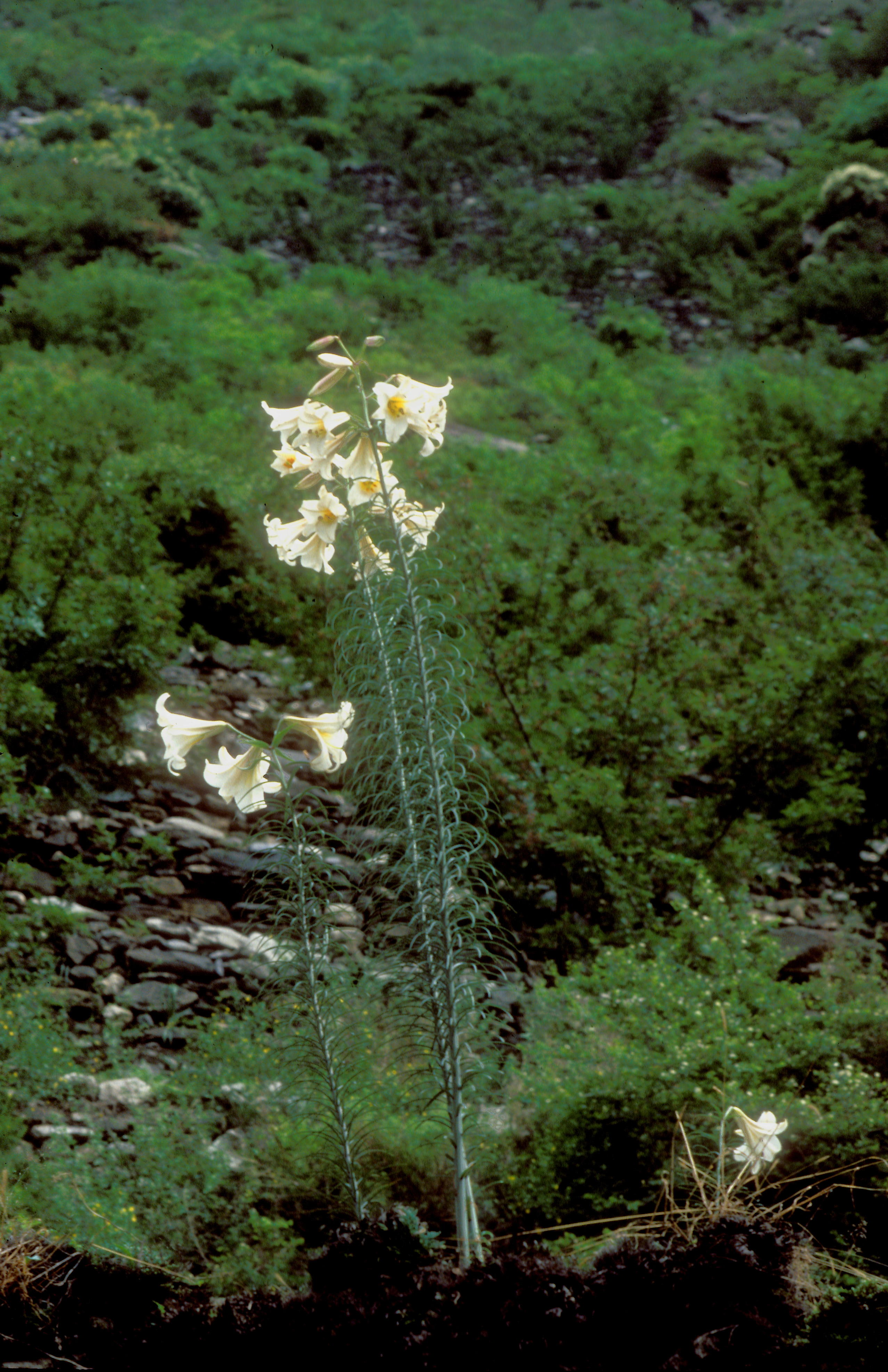
The Regal Lily, L. regale

On his first return Wilson married Helen Ganderton, of Edgbaston, but within six months Veitch sent him out again, this time with the yellow Chinese poppy, Meconopsis integrifolia as his objective. In 1903 Wilson discovered the Regal lily in western Sichuan along the Min River. He revisited the site in 1908 and collected more bulbs, but most of these rotted while en route back to the Arnold Arboretum in Boston. In 1910 he again returned to the Min valley, but this time his leg was crushed during an avalanche of boulders as he was carried along the trail in his sedan chair. After setting his leg with the tripod of his camera, he was carried back to civilisation on a three-day forced march. Thereafter he walked with what he called his "lily limp". It was this third shipment of bulbs that successfully introduced the Regal Lily into cultivation in the United States.

A few of the many plants introduced to western cultivation from his first expedition include Acer griseum, Actinidia chinensis var. deliciosa (kiwifruit), Berberis julianae, Clematis armandii, Clematis montana var. rubens, Davidia involucrata, Ilex pernyi, Jasminum mesnyi, and Primula pulverulenta. Many of the species he collected were formally named by Maxwell T. Masters. In his reminiscence If I were to Make a Garden, Wilson claimed to have introduced 25 species of wild rose to the West. One of them, Rosa willmottiae was named after Ellen Willmott a famous, important sponsor, expert and writer of "The Genus Rosa". Early in the 20th century Henry Morris Upcher, owner of Sheringham Park, Norfolk, England obtained Rhododendron seeds of various types from Wilson. Plants from this source which can be found at the garden include Rhododendron ambiguum, R. calophytum and R. decorum, among others.

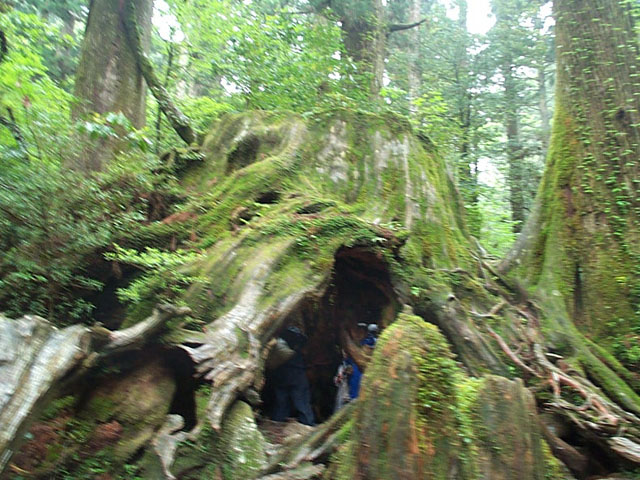
The Wilson stump (ウィルソン株, Wilson kabu) is at elevation 1,030m in Yakushima. The tree, Sugi, when it was cut by the Shimazu clan under order of Toyotomi Hideyoshi to build Hōkō-ji in 1586, had an estimated age of over 3,000 years. The base circumference is 32 m and 4.39 m across at chest height. The hollow is 10 tatami width and contains a small Kamidana. (Click to see the men standing in the hollow.)

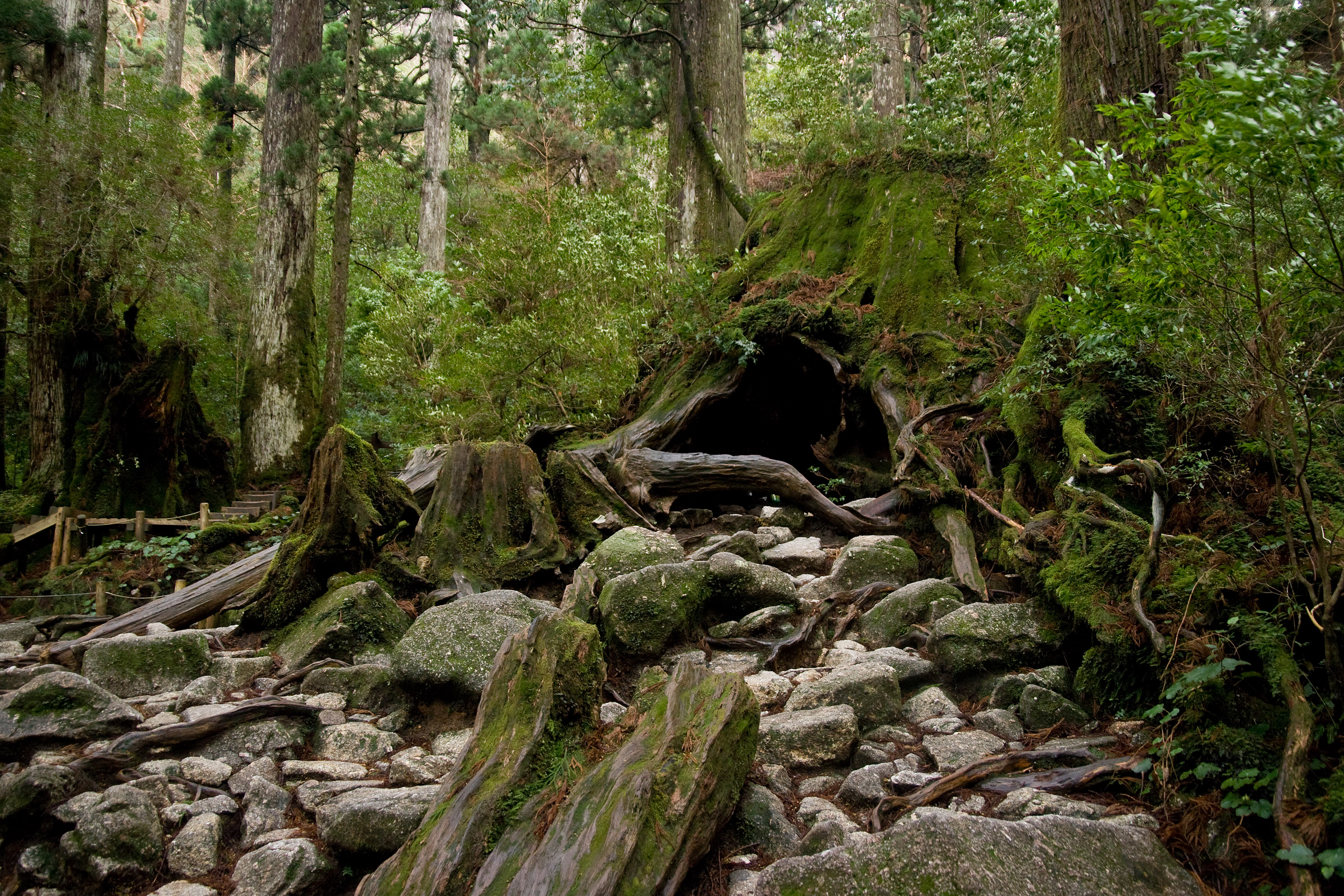
The Wilson stump (ウィルソン株, Wilson kabu) seen in the distance.

In subsequent years he became a collector for Sargent at the Arnold Arboretum, and made further expeditions to China in 1907, 1908, and 1910, as well as to Japan (1911–1916), where he collected 63 named forms of cherry blossom. One of his footprints in Japan is Wilson's introduction of the gigantic "Yaku sugi stump" called Wilson stump (ウィルソン株, Wilson kabu) in Yakushima to Western readers in 1914. His hypothesis made in 1916, that the Japanese cherry Prunus × yedoensis was a hybrid, was supported by hybridisation experiments in Japanese national laboratories in 1965.

He returned to Asia in 1917–1918, exploring in Korea and Formosa. Upon return to the Arnold Arboretum in 1919 he was appointed associate director. Three years later he set off for a two-year expedition through Australia, New Zealand, India, Central and South America, and East Africa. In 1927 he became Keeper of the Arnold Arboretum.

Wilson and his wife died in Worcester, Massachusetts, on 15 October 1930 as the result of an automobile accident. He requested to be buried on British dominion soil and so as he is reputed to have helped design Mount Royal Cemetery in Outremont, Canada, this was where he was laid to rest.

== Honours ==
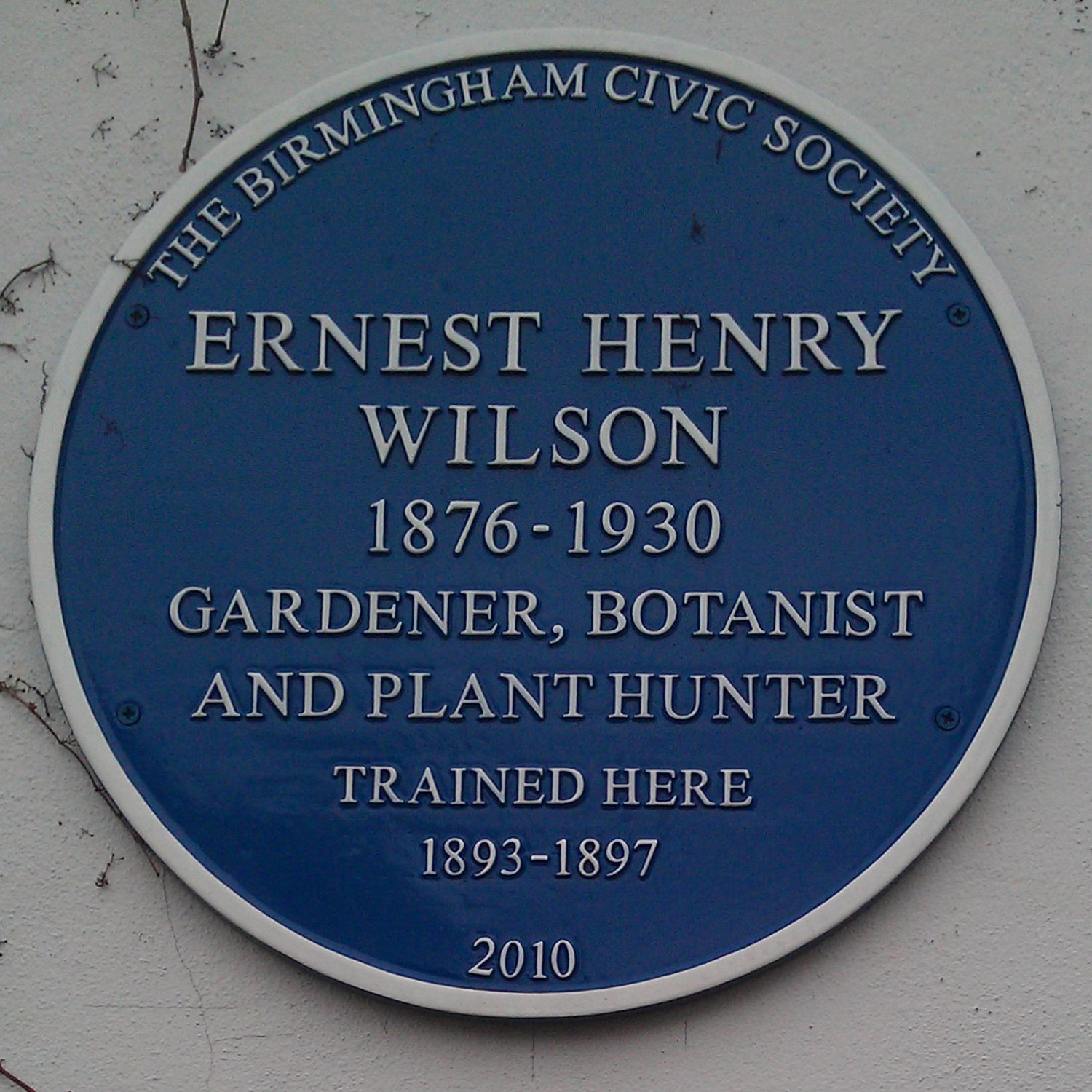
Blue plaque at Birmingham Botanical Gardens

In recognition of his service to horticulture he received many awards such as the Royal Horticultural Society's Veitch Memorial Medal in 1906 and their Victoria Medal of Honour in 1912, and the George Robert White Memorial Medal of the Massachusetts Horticultural Society. He was a fellow of the American Academy of Arts and Sciences and received an honorary M.A. degree from Harvard University and a D.Sc. degree from Trinity College.

Over 100 plants introduced by Wilson have received the First-Class Certificate or Awards of Merit of the Royal Horticultural Society of London. Sixty species and varieties of Chinese plants bear his name. In 1916–1917 Charles Sprague Sargent edited a partial list of his introductions as Plantae Wilsonianae.

The Ernest Wilson Memorial Garden and a blue plaque marking his birthplace are in the Cotswold market town of Chipping Campden, Gloucestershire. In May 2010, a blue plaque was also erected at Birmingham Botanical Gardens, by the Birmingham Civic Society, marking Wilson's time there.

For the 2015 Tatton Park Flower Show the gardening staff at Tatton Park, Cheshire created the China 'Mother of Gardens' exhibit. Many species Wilson collected were used in a design based around traditional Chinese courtyard designs.

== Selected works ==
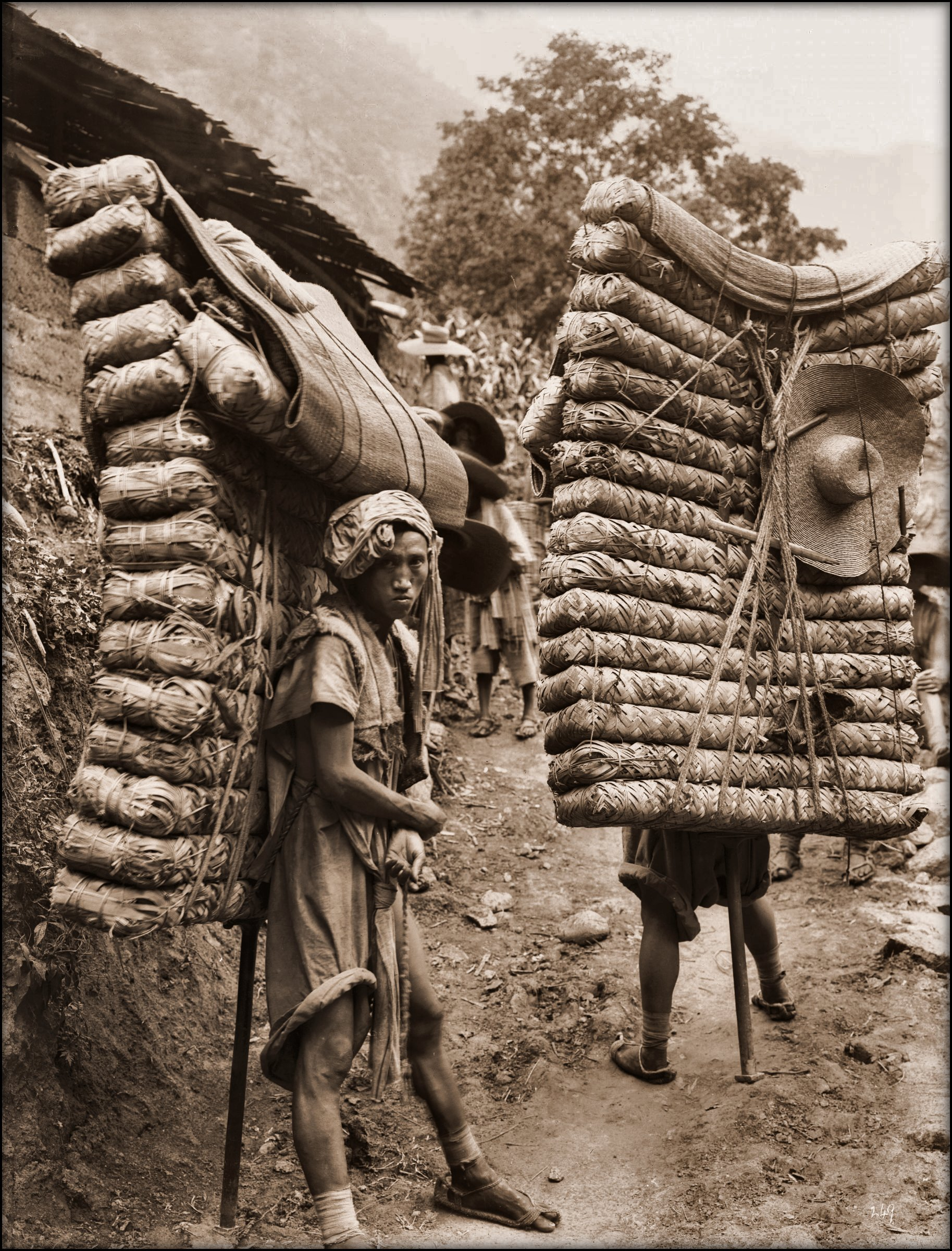
"Men laden with 'Brick tea' for Thibet" from the personal notations of Ernest Henry Wilson in 1908

- 1912: Vegetation in western China: a series of 500 photographs with index
- 1913: Naturalist in western China, with vasculum, camera, and gun; being some account of eleven years' travel, exploration, and observation in the more remote parts of the Flowery Kingdom (online text)
- 1916: Conifers and taxads of Japan (online text)
- 1916: History and botanical relationships of the modern rose, compiled by Ernest H. Wilson and Fred A. Wilson
- 1916: The cherries of Japan (online text)
- 1917: Plantae Wilsonianae; an enumeration of the woody plants collected in western China for the Arnold arboretum of Harvard university during the years 1907, 1908, and 1910, by E. H. Wilson, ed. by Charles Sprague Sargent
- 1917: Aristocrats of the garden (online text)
- 1920: Romance of our trees (online text)
- 1921: Monograph of azaleas: Rhododendron subgenus Anthodendron, by Ernest Henry Wilson and Alfred Rehder
- 1925: America's greatest garden; the Arnold Arboretum
- 1925: Lilies of eastern Asia; a monograph
- 1927: Plant hunting
- 1928: More aristocrats of the garden
- 1929: China, mother of gardens
- 1930: Aristocrats of the trees
- 1931: If I Were to Make a Garden

== See also ==
- Photos of Wilson Stump
