= Darling pea =

Darling pea can refer to many species in the genus Swainsona.

Specific plants commonly referred to as Darling pea without a modifying epithet can include:

- Swainsona greyana, also known as the hairy Darling pea
- Swainsona galegifolia, also known as the smooth Darling pea
