= Kadsura matsudae =

Scientific classification
- Kingdom: Plantae
- Clade: Embryophytes
- Clade: Tracheophytes
- Clade: Angiosperms
- Order: Austrobaileyales
- Family: Schisandraceae
- Genus: Kadsura
- Species: K. matsudae

Binomial name
- Kadsura matsudae Hayata

Species of flowering plant

Kadsura matsudae is a woody, climbing vine (liana) in the family Schisandraceae, and it is native to the Ryukyu islands of Japan. While once considered a synomyn of Kadsura japonica, it has since been amended and is now accepted under the name Kadsura matsudae..
