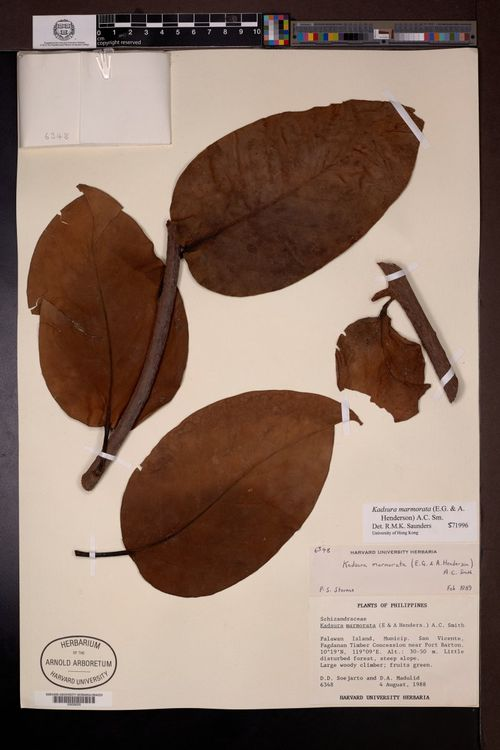

Scientific classification
- Kingdom: Plantae
- Clade: Embryophytes
- Clade: Tracheophytes
- Clade: Spermatophytes
- Clade: Angiosperms
- Order: Austrobaileyales
- Family: Schisandraceae
- Genus: Kadsura
- Species: K. marmorata

Binomial name
- Kadsura marmorata (Hend. & Andr.Hend.) A.C.Sm.

Synonyms
- List: Schisandra marmorata (H.Low ex C.Turner & J.Spencer) Hemsl.; Sphaerostema marmoratum H.Low ex C.Turner & J.Spencer; Kadsura apoensis Elmer; Kadsura clemensiae A.C.Sm.; Kadsura sulphurea Elmer

= Kadsura marmorata =

Species of flowering plant

Kadsura marmorata is a liana in the family Schisandraceae, native to Borneo (Sabah, Sarawak) and the Philippines (Mindanao, Palawan).

== Description ==
Kadsura marmorata thrives in wet biomes. It has coriaceous, lamina to ovate leaves, and a 19–33 mm (0.75–1.30 in) long petiole. The flowers are borne solitary (singular) in the axils of leaves, or in fugaceous bracts, occasionally growing directly from the trunk. It produces aggregate fruits that have 100-200 berries (possibly more), that ripen creme to dull yellow or red. Each berry contains one or two seeds.

== Medicinal uses and pharmacology ==
Kadsura marmorata is used in traditional chinese medicine for numerous things, including:

- Treatment of bronchial asthma
- Treatment of eczema
- Treatment of acute and chronic infections

due to it containing Polysaccharides.

== Taxonomy ==
Kadsura marmorata was species description by Edward George Henderson and Andrew Augustus Henderson in 1861, then redescribed by scientist Albert Charles Smith in 1947. The species epithet marmorata refers to the Latin word for "marbled" (having a mottled or streaky appearance).
