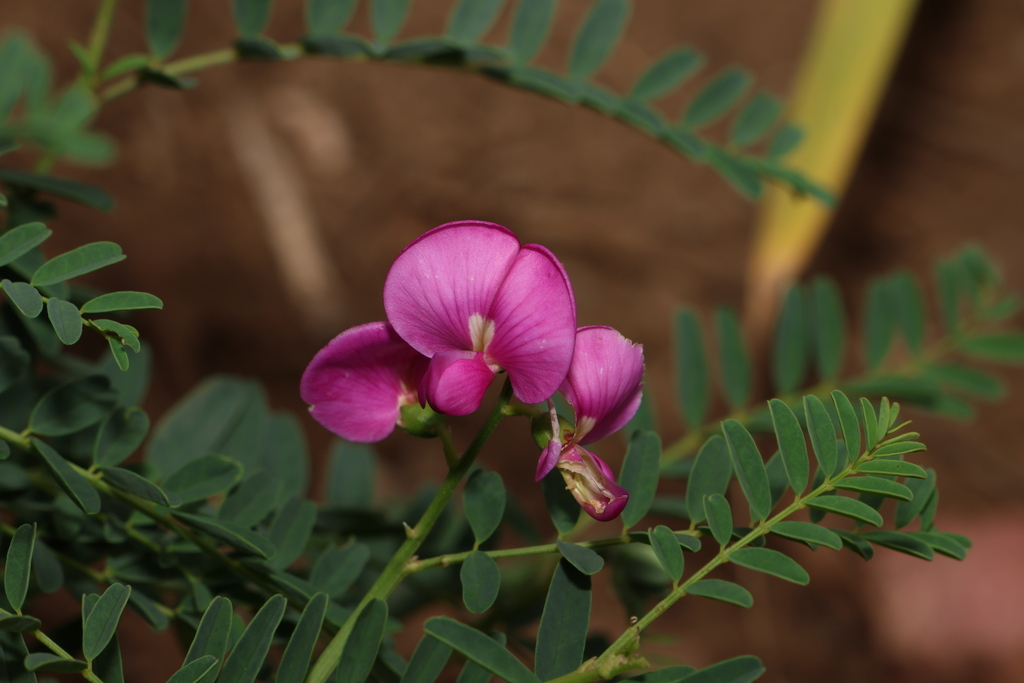
- Near Helidon

Scientific classification
- Kingdom: Plantae
- Clade: Tracheophytes
- Clade: Angiosperms
- Clade: Eudicots
- Clade: Rosids
- Order: Fabales
- Family: Fabaceae
- Subfamily: Faboideae
- Genus: Swainsona
- Species: S. queenslandica

Binomial name
- Swainsona queenslandica Joy Thomps.

= Swainsona queenslandica =

Species of plant

Swainsona queenslandica, commonly known as smooth Darling pea, is a species of flowering plant in the family Fabaceae and is endemic to eastern Australia. It is a perennial herb with imparipinnate leaves with 19 to 25 egg-shaped leaflets with the narrower end toward the base, and racemes of about 20 white, pinkish to orange red or dark red flowers.

== Description ==
Swainsona queenslandica is perennial herb that typically grows to a height of more than 1 m (3 ft 3 in). Its leaves are imparipinnate, 5–10 mm (0.20–0.39 in) long on a short petiole, with about 19 to 25, egg-shaped leaflets with the narrower end towards the base, the lower leaflets mostly 10–20 mm (0.39–0.79 in) long and 2–3 mm (0.079–0.118 in) wide. There is a stipule up to about 3 mm (0.12 in) long at the base of the petiole. The flowers are arranged in racemes up about 20 or more flowers on a peduncle 1–2 mm (0.039–0.079 in) wide, each flower mostly 15 mm (0.59 in) long on a pedicel about 5 mm (0.20 in) long. The sepals are joined at the base, forming a tube about 2–3 mm (0.079–0.118 in) long, the sepal lobes much longer than the tube. The petals are white, pinkish to orange red or dark red, the standard petal about 15 mm (0.59 in) long and wide, the wings about 10–15 mm (0.39–0.59 in) long, and the keel about 10–15 mm (0.39–0.59 in) long and 4–5 mm (0.16–0.20 in) deep. The fruit is broadly elliptic, 25–40 mm (0.98–1.57 in) long and about 15 mm (0.59 in) wide.

== Taxonomy and naming ==
Swainsona queenslandica was first formally described in 1990 by Joy Thompson in the journal Telopea from specimens collected by Karen Louise Wilson near the Crooble road in 1982. The specific epithet (queenslandica) refers to this most common member of the S. galegifolia – S. greyana group of species in Queensland.

== Distribution and habitat ==
This species of pea grows in a variety of soils in coastal and inland parts of central and south-eastern Queensland and inland areas of north-eastern New South Wales.
