= Interiotherin =

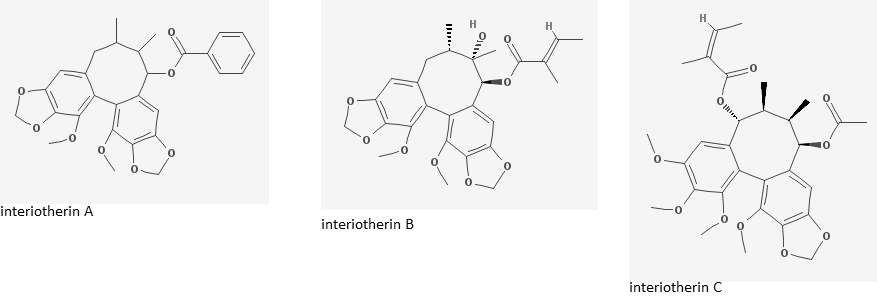
- Interiotherins A-C

Identifiers
CAS Number	A: 181701-06-4; B: 181701-07-5; C: 460090-65-7
3D model (JSmol)	A: Interactive image; B: Interactive image; C: Interactive image; D: Interactive image
ChEBI	A: CHEBI:66082; B: CHEBI:66083; C: CHEBI:67455
ChEMBL	A: ChEMBL484669; B: ChEMBL490161; C: ChEMBL488100; D: ChEMBL489756
ChemSpider	A: 19992190; B: 20144831; D: 8225747
PubChem CID	A: 21125391; B: 20839677; C: 10099233; D: 10050185
- InChI: A: InChI=1S/C29H28O8/c1-15-10-18-11-20-25(35-13-33-20)27(31-3)22(18)23-19(12-21-26(28(23)32-4)36-14-34-21)24(16(15)2)37-29(30)17-8-6-5-7-9-17/h5-9,11-12,15-16,24H,10,13-14H2,1-4H3/t15-,16-,24+/m0/s1 Key: MBGKPRSARHEFAG-CCHLGUQTSA-N; B: InChI=1S/C27H30O9/c1-7-13(2)26(28)36-25-16-10-18-22(35-12-33-18)24(31-6)20(16)19-15(8-14(3)27(25,4)29)9-17-21(23(19)30-5)34-11-32-17/h7,9-10,14,25,29H,8,11-12H2,1-6H3/b13-7-/t14-,25-,27-/m0/s1 Key: KIOQRWNZGHZFHB-UFZBKZSQSA-N; C: InChI=1S/C30H36O10/c1-10-14(2)30(32)40-25-16(4)15(3)24(39-17(5)31)19-12-21-27(38-13-37-21)29(36-9)23(19)22-18(25)11-20(33-6)26(34-7)28(22)35-8/h10-12,15-16,24-25H,13H2,1-9H3/b14-10-/t15-,16+,24-,25-/m1/s1 Key: HIGLJZHMTBHEQS-HWZXAUMYSA-N; D: InChI=1S/C26H26O8/c1-6-12(2)25(29)34-21-14(4)13(3)7-15-8-17(30-5)20(27)24(28)26(15)10-31-23-19(26)16(21)9-18-22(23)33-11-32-18/h6-9,13-14,21H,10-11H2,1-5H3/b12-6-,15-7-/t13-,14-,21-,26+/m1/s1 Key: PFTANZOUWVSEQC-ZEZBFVHVSA-N
- SMILES: A: C[C@H]1CC2=CC3=C(C(=C2C4=C(C5=C(C=C4[C@@H]([C@H]1C)OC(=O)C6=CC=CC=C6)OCO5)OC)OC)OCO3; B: C/C=C(/C)\C(=O)O[C@H]1C2=CC3=C(C(=C2C4=C(C5=C(C=C4C[C@@H]([C@]1(C)O)C)OCO5)OC)OC)OCO; C: C/C=C(/C)\C(=O)O[C@@H]1[C@H]([C@H]([C@H](C2=CC3=C(C(=C2C4=C(C(=C(C=C14)OC)OC)OC)OC)OCO3)OC(=O)C)C)C; D: C/C=C(/C)\C(=O)O[C@@H]1[C@@H]([C@@H](/C=C\2/C=C(C(=O)C(=O)[C@@]23COC4=C3C1=CC5=C4OCO5)OC)C)C
- Except where otherwise noted, data are given for materials in their standard state (at 25 °C [77 °F], 100 kPa). Infobox references

Interiotherins are lignans isolated from Kadsura.

They have a core of dibenzocyclooctadiene and contain methyl and methoxy side chains. They have a role as anti-HIV agent.
