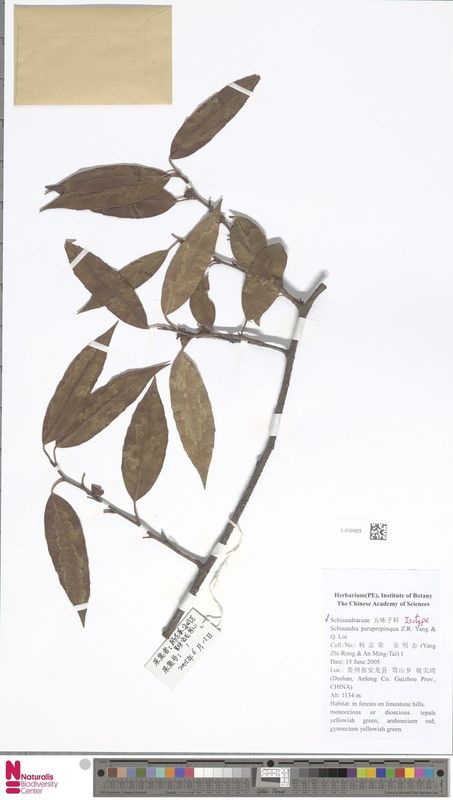

Scientific classification
- Kingdom: Plantae
- Clade: Embryophytes
- Clade: Tracheophytes
- Clade: Spermatophytes
- Clade: Angiosperms
- Order: Austrobaileyales
- Family: Schisandraceae
- Genus: Schisandra
- Species: S. parapropinqua

Binomial name
- Schisandra parapropinqua Z.R.Yang & Q.Lin

= Schisandra parapropinqua =

Species of flowering plant

Schisandra parapropinqua is a species of flowering plant in the family Schisandraceae. The species is native to China, and was described in 2009.

S. parapropinqua is a climbing plant with papery to subleathery leaves, pink to greenish-yellow tepals, and pale brown seeds.

== Taxonomy ==
Schisandra parapropinqua was described by Zhi Rong Yang and Qi Lin in 2009. The type material was collected from Anlong County, Guizhou, China, at an elevation of 1,134 metres (3,720 ft), in 2005.

Specimens of Schisandra parapropinqua were formerly confused with Schisandra propinqua.

== Distribution ==
Schisandra parapropinqua is native to the subtropical biome of Guizhou and Yunnan, south-west China. It grows in thickets and forests, on limestone hills, at elevations of 800–1,300 metres (2,600–4,300 ft).

== Description ==
Schisandra parapropinqua is a climbing plant with smooth woody vines. It can be monoecious or dioecious.

The leaves are papery to subleathery, long and wider in the middle, 4.5–11.2 centimetres (1.8–4.4 in) long, and 1–2.5 centimetres (0.39–0.98 in) wide. The leaf stems are 6–14 millimetres (0.24–0.55 in) long, and 1–2 millimetres (0.039–0.079 in) in diameter.

The flowers are in clusters of two to three, or three to five on inflorescences. The flowers have five to fourteen pink or yellowish-green tepals. The outermost tepals are 0.6–5 millimetres (0.024–0.197 in) long, 0.8–3 millimetres (0.031–0.118 in) wide, and elliptical to ovate. The innermost tepals are 5–15 millimetres (0.20–0.59 in) long, and 4–11 millimetres (0.16–0.43 in) wide. The male flowers have nine to thirteen fused stamens. The female flowers have thirty to thirty-nine carpels. The flower stems are 5–8 millimetres (0.20–0.31 in) long.

The seeds are pale brown, flat and kidney-shaped, 3–4 millimetres (0.12–0.16 in) long, 4–4.6 millimetres (0.16–0.18 in) wide, and 2.5–4 millimetres (0.098–0.157 in) thick. The seed case is smooth.

The plant flowers from May to July, and fruits from late July to September.

Schisandra parapropinqua is similar to Schisandra plena and Schisandra propinqua, though it has smaller leaves and differently coloured stamens than the other species.
