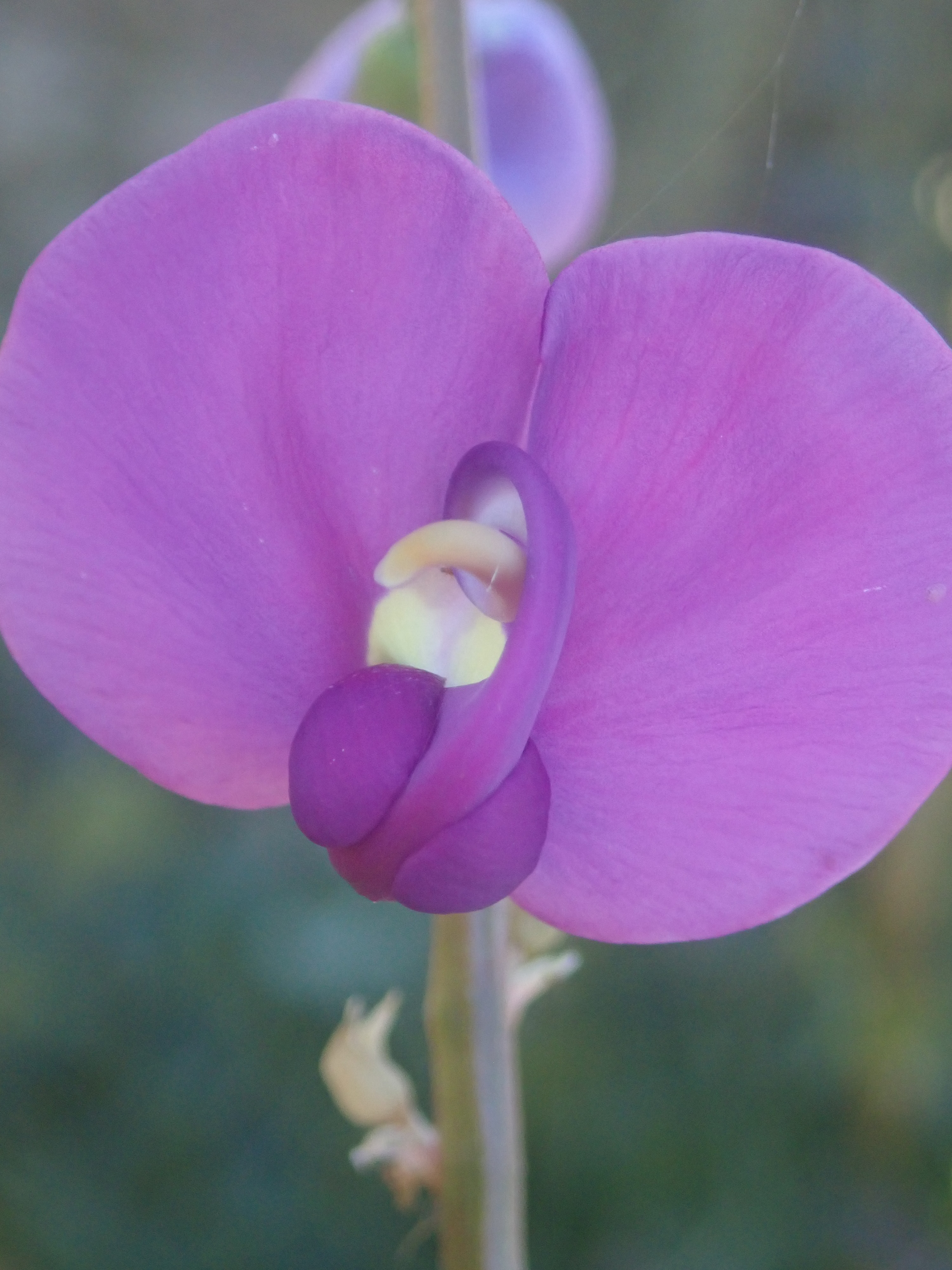

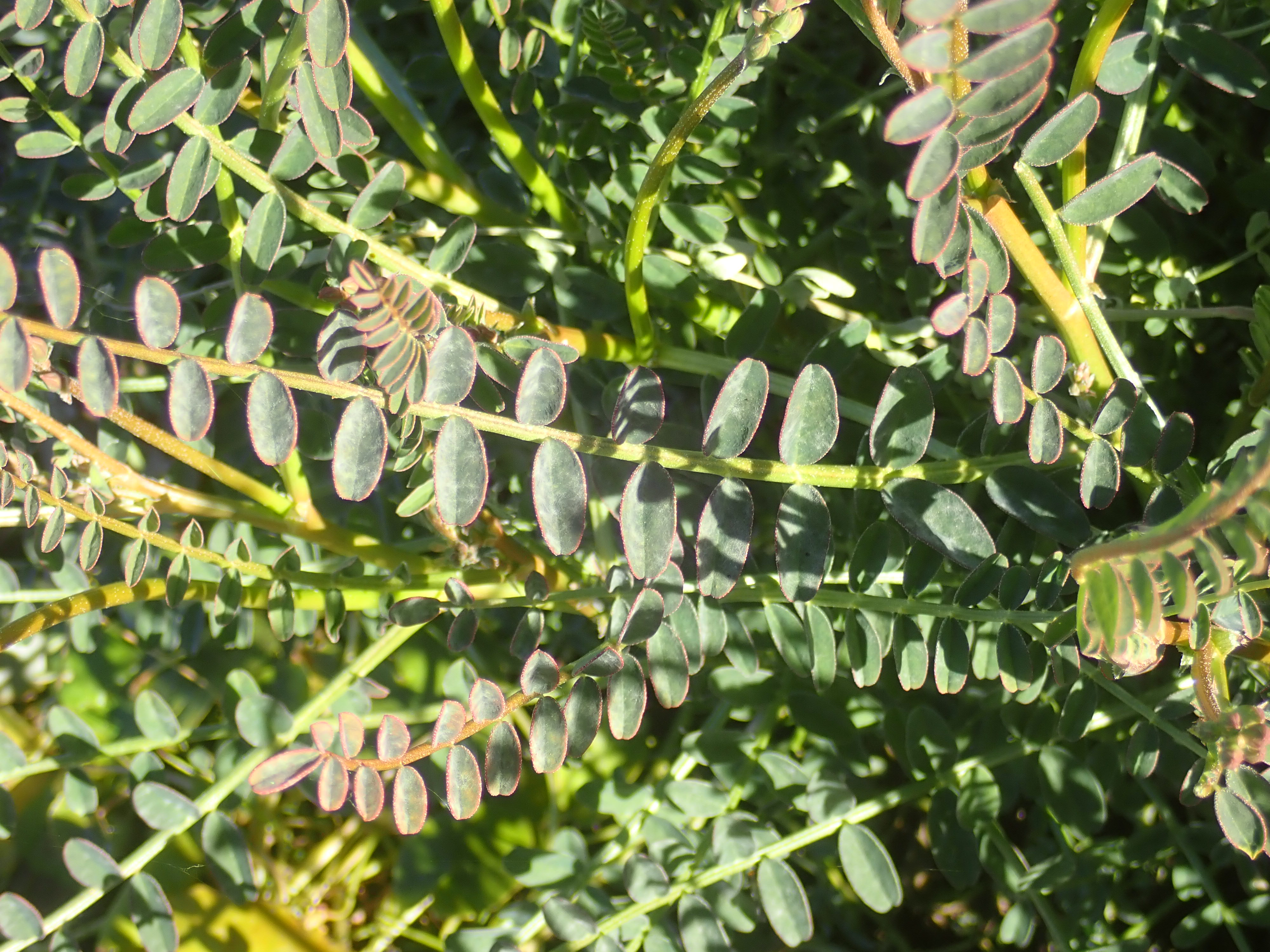

Scientific classification
- Kingdom: Plantae
- Clade: Tracheophytes
- Clade: Angiosperms
- Clade: Eudicots
- Clade: Rosids
- Order: Fabales
- Family: Fabaceae
- Subfamily: Faboideae
- Genus: Swainsona
- Species: S. procumbens

Binomial name
- Swainsona procumbens (F.Muell) F.Muell.

Synonyms
- Cyclogyne procumbens F.Muell. Swainsona violacea Hend.

= Swainsona procumbens =

Species of plant

Swainsona procumbens, commonly known as Broughton pea or swamp pea is a species of flowering plant in the pea family (Fabaceae), and is native to Australia. It is a spreading or ascending perennial shrub-like herb with imparipinnate leaves with 15 to 25 linear to narrowly lance-shaped leaflets with the narrower end towards the base, and racemes of 2 to 12 purple or mauve to pink flowers.

== Description ==
Swainsona procumbens is a spreading or ascending, perennial shrub-like herb, with more or less glabrous smooth stems, and grows up to 50 cm (20 in) high. The leaves are from 50–150 mm (2.0–5.9 in) long, and imparipinnate with from 15 to 25 leaflets which have apices which are either notched or obtuse, and are 5–25 mm (0.20–0.98 in) long and 1–5 mm (0.039–0.197 in) wide. The leaflet surfaces are glabrous, or sometimes with soft hairs on the lower surface. There are stipules 2–7 mm (0.079–0.276 in) long at the base of the petioles. The flowers are arranged in racemes of 2 to 12, the flowers mostly 8–15 mm (0.31–0.59 in) long, with sepals joined at the base, forming a tube 2.0–2.5 mm (0.079–0.098 in) long, the lobes longer than the tube. The standard petal is 6–16 mm (0.24–0.63 in) long and 9–22 mm (0.35–0.87 in) wide, the wings about 9–15 mm (0.35–0.59 in) long and the keel about 8–12 mm (0.31–0.47 in) long and about 3 mm (0.12 in) deep. Flowering occurs from May to October, and the fruit is an elliptic, curved pod 15–35 mm (0.59–1.38 in) long and 5–8 mm (0.20–0.31 in) long, with the remains of the style 10–20 mm (0.39–0.79 in) long.

== Taxonomy ==
Swainsona procumbens was first formally described in 1853 by Ferdinand von Mueller who gave it the name Cyclogyne procumbens, in the journal Linnaea: Ein Journal für die Botanik in ihrem ganzen Umfange, oder Beiträge zur Pflanzenkunde from specimens collected near the Broughton River, but in 1859, Mueller reassigned it to the genus, Swainsona as S. procumbens in his Fragmenta Phytographiae Australiae. The specific epithet (procumbens) means procumbent.

== Distribution and habitat ==
Broughton pea grows on heavy, frequently water logged soils or on sand dunes and is found on the western slopes and plains of inland New South Wales, in inland Victoria and in Queensland.
