= A. A. Henderson =

American surveyor, navy surgeon, and inventor

Andrew Augustus Henderson (born Huntingdon County, Pennsylvania, February 14, 1816; died Brooklyn, New York, April 4, 1875) was an American surveyor, navy surgeon, and inventor who is best known today for his work collecting biological specimens.

== Family and early life ==
Henderson was the son of Dr. John Henderson (1774–1848?) and his second wife Elizabeth Allison. His uncle Joseph Henderson, also a doctor, served two terms as a U.S. Representative (1833–1837) from Pennsylvania. Henderson was the fourth of his father's eight sons (and no daughters), although most of them died young. His older brother Matthew (1814–1894) was also a surgeon.

== Career ==
Henderson was employed by the Pennsylvania Geological Survey in 1839 and 1840; his work on it was praised by geologist J. P. Lesley in a history of early survey efforts.

Henderson graduated from Jefferson Medical College in Philadelphia in 1841 and was commissioned as an Assistant Surgeon in the U.S. Navy. He was advanced to Surgeon in 1856 and Medical Director in 1871.

Henderson at first was attached to vessels involved with the Seminole War; he was part of an 1842 canoe expedition into the Everglades commanded by Lieutenant John Rodgers. Henderson later sailed on vessels interdicting slave traders off the coast of Africa.

During the Mexican-American War he was present at the battles of Río San Gabriel and La Mesa, January 8-9, 1847, which led to the recapture of Los Angeles.

In 1852-3 he served aboard the USS Dolphin on a voyage that helped generate the first bathymetric charts of the Atlantic Ocean.

From 1853-6 he was stationed at the Philadelphia Naval Asylum and a member of the Board of Examiners.

From 1856 to 1858 he served aboard the USS Portsmouth on a cruise to the Pacific, seeing action at Canton in 1856.

In 1860 Henderson received three patents for improvements to reaping and mowing machines. He applied to extend two of the patents in 1874.

After the return of the Portsmouth he was stationed at the Portsmouth Naval Shipyard until 1861, when he was transferred to the USS Richmond, which operated in the Gulf of Mexico on blockade duty. In 1862-3 the Richmond was part of David Farragut's squadron which assisted in the capture of New Orleans, Vicksburg, and other Confederate strongholds on the lower Mississippi.

In 1864 Henderson was posted to the Norfolk Naval Hospital. In 1868–1869 he was appointed as fleet surgeon for the South Pacific Squadron. In 1870–1871 he served at the Boston Navy Yard.

In 1871 Henderson was promoted to medical director and posted to the Brooklyn Navy Yard, where he served as the director of the Naval Laboratory there, a unit which provided drugs and medical supplies to the navy, until his death in 1875.

== Specimen collecting ==
From 1848, Henderson was a Correspondent of the Academy of Natural Sciences of Philadelphia, and would periodically send biological specimens back to Philadelphia for study. In 1858 he contributed a collection of birds to the Academy collected in Japan and the Philippines which was the subject of an article in the Academy's journal. A number of plant species were named from specimens collected by Henderson - the shrubs Coptosperma borbonica and Tarenna borbonica of the Indian Ocean island of Réunion, the vine Kadsura marmorata of Borneo and The Philippines, and Gazania splendens, a South African ornamental composite, among others. In 1919 zoologist Henry Weed Fowler named a species of Zenarchopterus (a type of viviparous halfbeak fish) after Henderson, but the specimen Henderson collected is now considered to be Zenarchopterus ectuntio.

== Personal life ==
Henderson married Mary Elizabeth Peaco (1825-1872), daughter of Dr. John W. Peaco (also a navy surgeon, although he had died in 1827). They had John Augustus Henderson (1853-), a navy engineer, George Andrew Henderson (1855-), Virginia Henderson (1859-), and Robley Dunglison Henderson (1861-1864).

Henderson and his wife are buried in Woodlands cemetery in Philadelphia.
