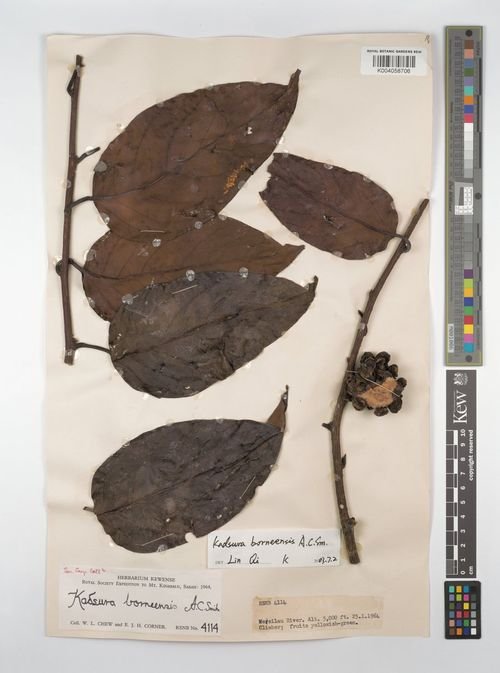

Scientific classification
- Kingdom: Plantae
- Clade: Tracheophytes
- Clade: Angiosperms
- Order: Austrobaileyales
- Family: Schisandraceae
- Genus: Kadsura
- Species: K. borneensis

Binomial name
- Kadsura borneensis A.C.Sm.

= Kadsura borneensis =

Species of vine

Kadsura borneensis is a woody, climbing vine (liana) in the family Schisandraceae, and is native to Borneo (Sabah).

== Description ==
Kadsura borneensis is a woody liana with elliptic to ovate leaves that are highly coriaceous. it has flowers borne solitary (singular) in either the axils of leaves, or in fugaceous bracts. It has petioles of 16.5–32 mm long on average, and a short peduncle of 0–1.9 mm long, and 14–22 by 9.5–11.5 mm berries, ripening red to purple.

== Taxonomy ==
Kadsura borneensis was described by Albert Charles Smith in 1947. The species epithet borneensis is due to the fact it is native only to Borneo (Sabah).
