= Kadsura oblongifolia =

Scientific classification
- Kingdom: Plantae
- Clade: Embryophytes
- Clade: Tracheophytes
- Clade: Spermatophytes
- Clade: Angiosperms
- Order: Austrobaileyales
- Family: Schisandraceae
- Genus: Kadsura
- Species: K. oblongifolia

Binomial name
- Kadsura oblongifolia Merr.

Species of flowering plant

Kadsura oblongifolia is a species of flowering plant in the family Schisandraceae.

== Description ==
Kadsura oblongifolia is an evergreen climber.

The plants are smooth. The leaf stems are 5-14mm long. The leaves are elliptical in shape, and have a papery or leathery texture. They measure 6-10cm long and 2-3cm wide. The base of the leaf is wedge-shaped. The leaf edges are smooth or finely-toothed. The leaf apex is round, pointed, or tapers to a point.

Individual flowers are either male or female, but only one sex is found on any individual plant. The male flower stems are 0.8-1.5 cm long, and the female flower stems are 1-3 cm long. The flowers are yellow or pink. The fruit stems are 2-2.3 cm long. The fruits, which are 1-2cm in diameter, are red, kidney-shaped, and have one or two seeds each. The plant flowers from July to November, and fruits from October to November. It is in leaf all year round.

The species can grow in semi-shade or full sun.

== Distribution ==
The species is native to the Guangxi, Guangdong, and Hainan regions of China, and western and southern Taiwan. It grows in forests on dry soils, at elevations from 100 to 900m.

== Uses ==
Kadsura oblongifolia produces edible fruit, which can be eaten raw or cooked. The species is used in medicine.
