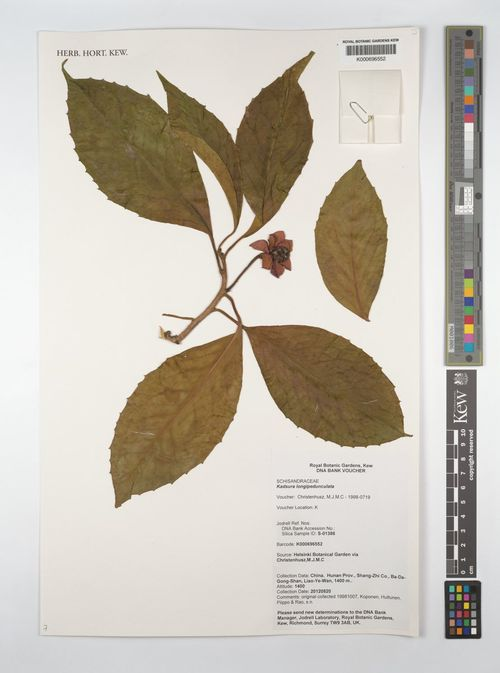

Scientific classification
- Kingdom: Plantae
- Clade: Tracheophytes
- Clade: Angiosperms
- Order: Austrobaileyales
- Family: Schisandraceae
- Genus: Kadsura
- Species: K. longipedunculata

Binomial name
- Kadsura longipedunculata Finet & Gagnep.

Synonyms
- Kadsura discigera Finet & Gagnep.; Kadsura omeiensis S. F. Lan; Kadsura peltigera Rehder & E.H.Wilson

= Kadsura longipedunculata =

Species of shrub

Kadsura longipedunculata, also known as the Chinese kadsura vine, is a fruit bearing monoecious wild evergreen climbing shrub, that is native to Eastern Asia, Western China and Southern China. This rare flower is often used for its medicinal properties in Asia.

== Description ==
Kadsura longipedunculata can grown between 2.5 meter and 3.5 meters in height, prefers to grow in semi shaded areas and requires water often. The male flowers can be either red or cream while the female flowers tend to be only cream colored. The sepals of the female flowers turn inwards created a dome-shape while the sepals of the male flowers are slightly curved upwards but do not close.

== Uses ==
The fruit of Kadsura longipedunculata is edible both cooked and raw, and can be stripped of its essential oils and used as a fragrance. The essential oils from the stem has been used to treat infections, arthritis and gastrointestinal issue. The leaves have been used to treat irregular periods and canker sores.
