= William Wilson Potter =

American politician

William Wilson Potter (December 18, 1792 – October 28, 1839) was a member of the U.S. House of Representatives from Pennsylvania.

William W. Potter was born at Potters Mills, Pennsylvania. He completed preparatory studies in Bellefonte, Pennsylvania, and graduated from Dickinson College in Carlisle, Pennsylvania. He studied law, was admitted to the bar in 1814 and practiced his profession.

Potter was elected as a Democrat to the Twenty-fifth and Twenty-sixth Congresses and served until his death, before the assembling of the Twenty-sixth Congress, in Bellefonte. Interment in Union Cemetery in Bellefonte.

== See also ==
- List of members of the United States Congress who died in office (1790–1899)

== Sources ==
- United States Congress. "William Wilson Potter (id: P000469)". Biographical Directory of the United States Congress.
- The Political Graveyard

U.S. House of Representatives
Preceded by Joseph Henderson	Member of the U.S. House of Representatives from Pennsylvania's 14th congressional district 1837–1839	Succeeded by George McCulloch
