= Joseph Henderson (Pennsylvania politician) =

American politician

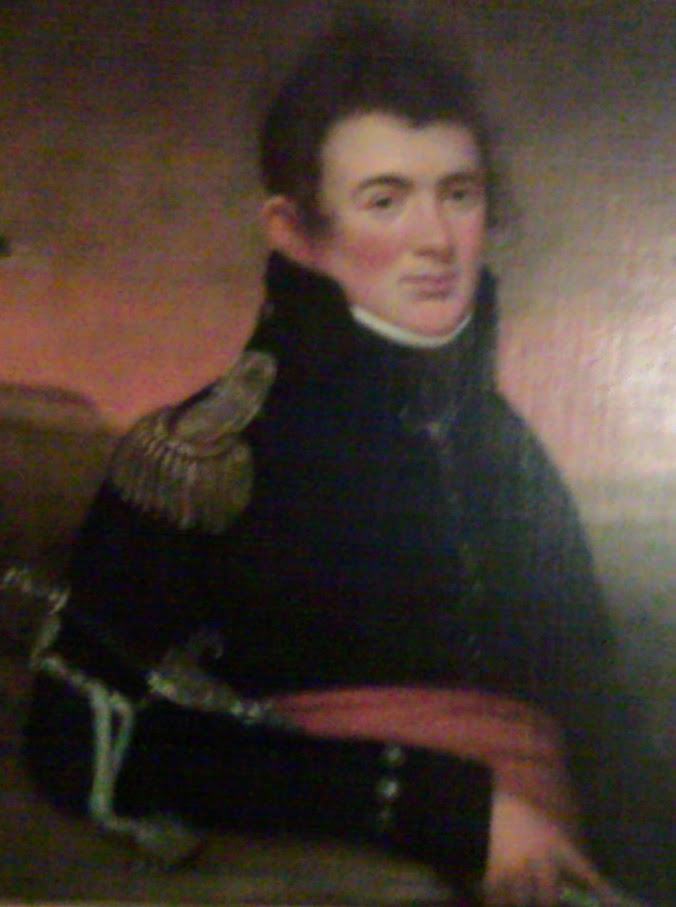
- Rep. Joseph Henderson

Member of the U.S. House of Representatives from Pennsylvania's 14th district
- In office March 4, 1833 – March 3, 1837
- Preceded by: Andrew Stewart
- Succeeded by: William Wilson Potter

Personal details
- Born: August 2, 1791 Shippensburg, Pennsylvania
- Died: December 25, 1863 (aged 72) Lewistown, Pennsylvania
- Party: Jacksonian
- Education: Jefferson Medical College

Military service
- Allegiance: United States
- Branch/service: United States Army
- Rank: Major (brevetted)
- Battles/wars: War of 1812

Joseph Henderson (August 2, 1791 – December 25, 1863) was a Jacksonian member of the U.S. House of Representatives from Pennsylvania.

== Biography ==
Joseph Henderson was born in Shippensburg, Pennsylvania. He moved with his parents to Centre County, Pennsylvania, in 1802. He attended the public schools and graduated from the Jefferson Medical College at Philadelphia in 1813. During the War of 1812, he was commissioned first lieutenant in the Twenty-second Regiment, Pennsylvania Volunteers, in the spring of 1813. He was promoted to captain in the fall of the same year. He was then brevetted major and given command of a regiment in 1814. He settled at Browns Mills, Pennsylvania, at the close of the war and engaged in the practice of medicine.

Henderson was elected as a Jacksonian to the Twenty-third and Twenty-fourth Congresses. He was not a candidate for renomination in 1836. He moved to Lewistown, Pennsylvania, in 1850 and continued the practice of medicine. He died in Lewistown in 1863. Interment in St. Mark’s Cemetery.

Henderson's nephew A. A. Henderson (1816-1875) was a navy surgeon and notable collector of biological specimens.

== Sources ==
- United States Congress. "Joseph Henderson (id: H000486)". Biographical Directory of the United States Congress.
- The Political Graveyard

U.S. House of Representatives
Preceded by Andrew Stewart	Member of the U.S. House of Representatives from Pennsylvania's 14th congressional district 1833–1837	Succeeded by William Wilson Potter
