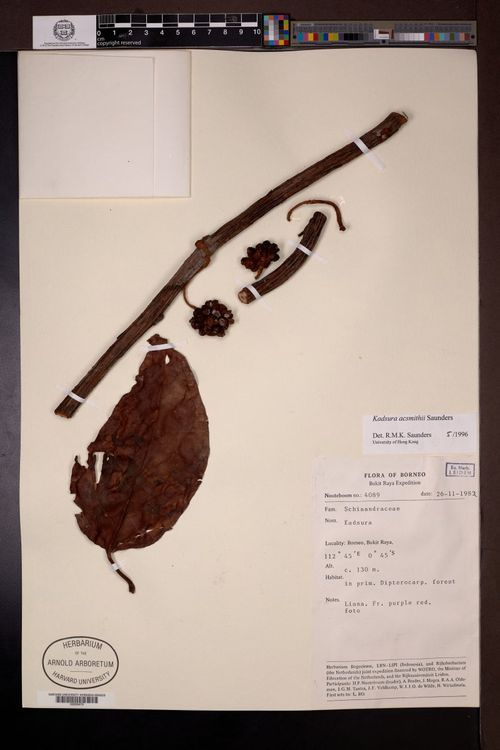

Scientific classification
- Kingdom: Plantae
- Clade: Tracheophytes
- Clade: Angiosperms
- Order: Austrobaileyales
- Family: Schisandraceae
- Genus: Kadsura
- Species: K. acsmithii

Binomial name
- Kadsura acsmithii R.M.K.Saunders

= Kadsura acsmithii =

Species of woody vines

Kadsura acsmithii is a species of woody vines in the family Schisandraceae.

== Description ==
Kadsura acsmithii is a climbing plant, and is native to Borneo.

== Taxonomy ==
The species was described by Richard M.K. Saunders in 1997, based on specimens collected in 1974, from Sarawak and Kalimantan, Borneo. The description was first published in the journal Blumea. The holotype is at the National Herbarium of the Netherlands.
