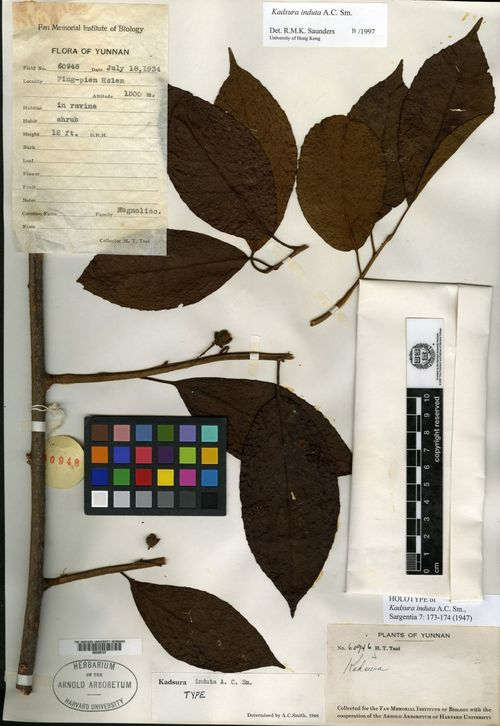

Scientific classification
- Kingdom: Plantae
- Clade: Tracheophytes
- Clade: Angiosperms
- Order: Austrobaileyales
- Family: Schisandraceae
- Genus: Kadsura
- Species: K. induta

Binomial name
- Kadsura induta A.C.Sm.

= Kadsura induta =

Species of flowering plant

Kadsura induta is a species of climbing liana in the family Schisandraceae. It is native to subtropical regions of China (Yunnan and Guangxi) and Vietnam. Unlike many other species in the genus Kadsura, which typically have a smooth exterior, the fruit of K. induta is covered in dense, hair-like structures (pubescent-tomentose).

== Description ==
The plant is a woody, evergreen vine (liana). Its most distinctive morphological feature is the fruit, which features a pubescent-tomentose exterior, distinguishing it from the smooth-fruited species common within the same genus.

== Phytochemistry ==
The plant is a subject of pharmacological research due to its secondary metabolites. It contains various biologically active compounds, specifically dibenzocyclooctadiene lignans, including:

- Kadsindutalignans A–C (1–3)
- Heteroclitalignan B (4)
- Kadsuphilin C (5)
- Kadsulignan E (6)

Studies have explored these compounds for their potential anti-inflammatory properties.
