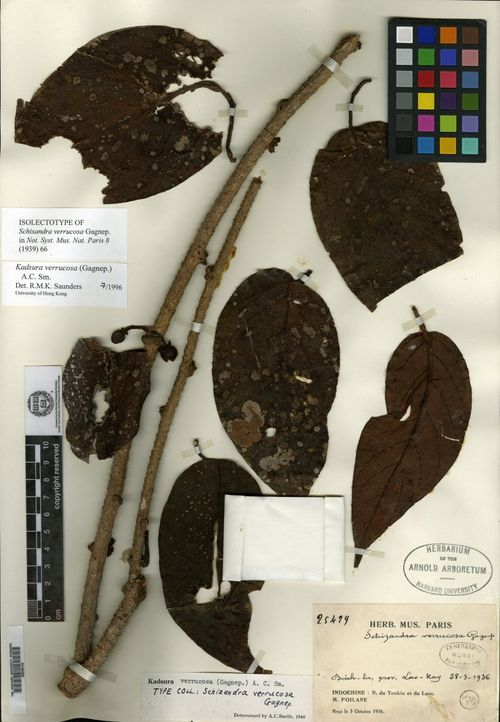

Scientific classification
- Kingdom: Plantae
- Clade: Tracheophytes
- Clade: Angiosperms
- Order: Austrobaileyales
- Family: Schisandraceae
- Genus: Kadsura
- Species: K. verrucosa

Binomial name
- Kadsura verrucosa Gagnep.

Synonyms
- Schisandra verrucosa Gagnep.

= Kadsura verrucosa =

Species of flowering plant

Kadsura verrucosa is a species of flowering plant in the family Schisandraceae.

== Description ==
Kadsura verrucosa is a climber. It is native to mainland Southeast Asia and Western Malesia, including Vietnam, Cambodia, Thailand, and Laos.

The leaves are tough, but flexible, with an elliptical or ovate shape. The leaf stalks are around 1.5 cm long. The flowers, which have stalks between 1 and 3cm, may grow as compact clusters on the trunk. The berries, which are 3 to 5 cm long, are red or yellow when ripe. The berries are either round or kidney-shaped, and contain one or two seeds.

== Taxonomy ==
The species was first described in 1947. The holotype, which was collected in Malaysia, is at the Naturalis Biodiversity Center, in Leiden, Netherlands.
