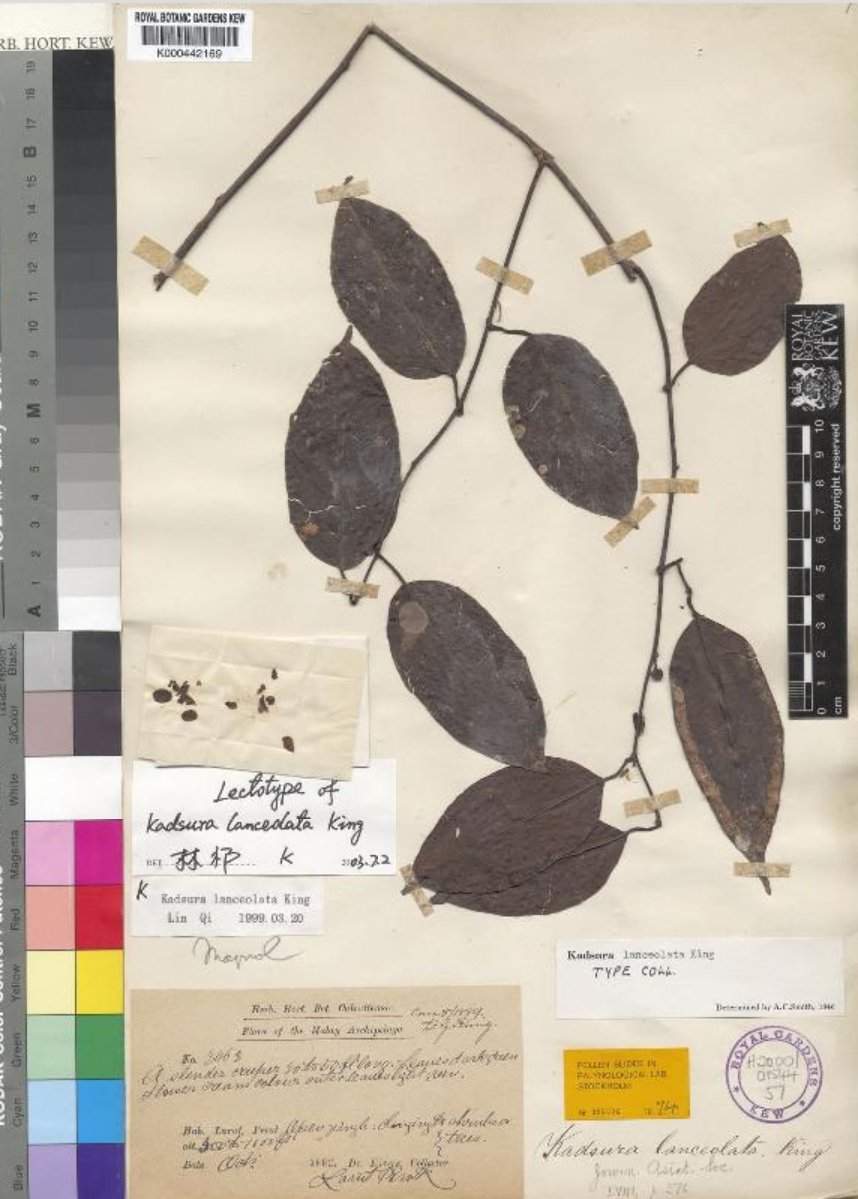

Scientific classification
- Kingdom: Plantae
- Clade: Tracheophytes
- Clade: Angiosperms
- Order: Austrobaileyales
- Family: Schisandraceae
- Genus: Kadsura
- Species: K. lanceolata

Binomial name
- Kadsura lanceolata King.

Synonyms
- Kadsura ultima A.C.Sm.

= Kadsura lanceolata =

Species of flowering plant

Kadsura lanceolata is a species of flowering plant in the family Schisandraceae.

== Distribution ==
Kadsura lanceolata is native to the wet tropical biome of Malesia. It is found on the islands of Sumatra, Borneo, Celebes, as well as the Moluccas archipelago and the Malay Peninsula.

== Description ==
Kadsura lanceolata is a climber.

Kadsura lanceolata has woody vines. The leaves are leathery but flexible, and have an elliptical or ovate shape. The leaves are 6-13 cm long and 3-6cm wide, and have blunt bases. The leaf apex tapers to a point, or is sharply pointed. The leaf edges are smooth. The leaf stalks are 7-18mm long.

The flowers are solitary, and always found on young growths. The flower stalk is 4-11 mm long. The fruit stalk is around 4-14 mm long. The berries are red or yellow when ripe, and may be attached without a stalk. Each berry has one to three seeds. The berries are disc-shaped or pear-shaped.
