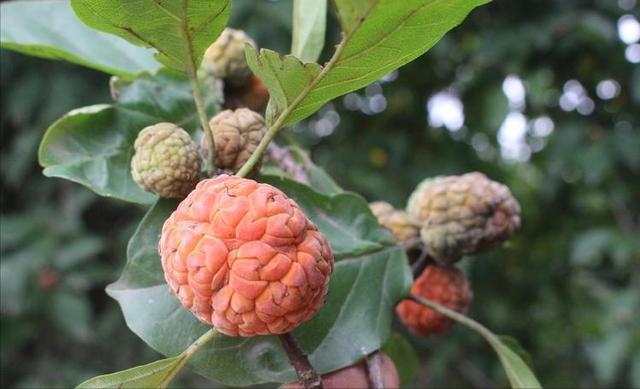

Scientific classification
- Kingdom: Plantae
- Clade: Tracheophytes
- Clade: Angiosperms
- Order: Austrobaileyales
- Family: Schisandraceae
- Genus: Kadsura
- Species: K. coccinea

Binomial name
- Kadsura coccinea (Lem.) A.C.Sm.

Synonyms
- Synonymy: Cosbaea coccinea Lem.; Kadsura ananosma Kerr; Kadsura calophylla A.C.Sm.; Kadsura cavaleriei H.Lév.; Kadsura chinensis Hance ex Benth.; Kadsura chinensis var. annamensis Gagnep.; Kadsura coccinea var. annamensis Gagnep.; Kadsura coccinea var. sichuanensis Y.W.Law; Kadsura hainanensis Merr.; Schisandra hanceana Baill.

= Kadsura coccinea =

Species of flowering plant

Kadsura coccinea, known by the common name Crimson kadsura, is a species of flowering plant in the family Schisandraceae. The species is an evergreen climber with white, red, and green flowers. It is native to south-east Asia.

Kadsura coccinea was described in 1947. It is used in medicine.

== Taxonomy ==
Kadsura coccinea was described in 1947 by Albert Charles Smith. The type specimen was cultivated in a botanic garden. It was probably grown from a plant introduced by Charles von Hügel.

== Description ==
K. coccinea is an evergreen climbing plant. It grows to 4–8 metres (13–26 ft) high. The plants are hairless.

The leaves are papery or leathery in texture, and are pointed and oval in shape. The leaves measure 7–19 centimetres (2.8–7.5 in) long, and 2.5–10 centimetres (0.98–3.94 in) wide. The leaf stems are 0.9–3 centimetres (0.35–1.18 in) long. The plant is in leaf all year round.

The flowers are solitary and cup shaped. Each plant has either male or female flowers, which may be white, red, and pale green. The plants flower from May to July.

Female plants develop segmented red to dark purple fruits. The fruits measure 6–10 centimetres (2.4–3.9 in) across. The fruit stems are 2.6–4.9 centimetres (1.0–1.9 in) long. Seeds ripen from August to November.

== Ecology ==
Kadsura coccinea is a host of the fungi Pestalotiopsis maculans, Corynespora cassiicola, Alternaria alternata, and Neopestalotiopsis clavispora.

== Distribution ==
Kadsura coccinea is found in the subtropical regions of south China and Indo-China, as well as Laos, Myanmar, Thailand, and Vietnam.

The species is found in semi-open shrublands, forests, in ravines, and on slopes, at elevations of 1,500–2,000 metres (4,900–6,600 ft). It grows best in moist clay, loam, and sand.

== Uses ==
The fruits are edible, and have a sedative effect when roasted. The seeds have aphrodisiac and tonic effects.

The Tujia people use the plant's roots to alleviate rheumatoid arthritis and gastrointestinal issues. The roots contain sesquiterpenes, which may attenuate arthritis related inflammation.
