= George McCulloch =

American politician

George McCulloch (February 22, 1792 – April 6, 1861) was an American politician who served as a Democratic member of the U.S. House of Representatives from Pennsylvania.

George McCulloch was born in Maysville, Kentucky. Upon the death of his parents, he was sent to Cumberland County, Pennsylvania, where he was reared by relatives. He became an ironmaster, with extensive iron interests in Centre County, Pennsylvania. He was a member of the Pennsylvania State Senate for the 17th district from 1835 to 1836. He was one of the proprietors of Hannah Furnace from 1836 to 1850.

McCulloch was elected as a Democrat to the Twenty-sixth Congress to fill the vacancy caused by the death of William W. Potter. He was an unsuccessful candidate for election in 1842. He retired from political life and active business pursuits with residence in Lewistown, Pennsylvania. He died in Port Royal, Pennsylvania.

== Sources ==
- United States Congress. "George McCulloch (id: M000389)". Biographical Directory of the United States Congress.
- The Political Graveyard

Pennsylvania State Senate
Preceded by Thomas Jackson	Member of the Pennsylvania Senate from the 17th district 1835–1836	Succeeded by Isaac Leet
U.S. House of Representatives
Preceded by William W. Potter	Member of the U.S. House of Representatives from Pennsylvania's 14th congressional district 1839–1841	Succeeded by James Irvin
