= Caloptilia kadsurae =

Scientific classification
- Kingdom: Animalia
- Phylum: Arthropoda
- Class: Insecta
- Order: Lepidoptera
- Family: Gracillariidae
- Genus: Caloptilia
- Species: C. kadsurae

Binomial name
- Caloptilia kadsurae Kumata, 1966

Species of moth

Caloptilia kadsurae is a moth of the family Gracillariidae. It is known from Japan (Honshū, Kyūshū and the Ryukyu Islands).

The wingspan is 13–14 mm.

The larvae feed on Kadsura japonica. They probably mine the leaves of their host plant.
