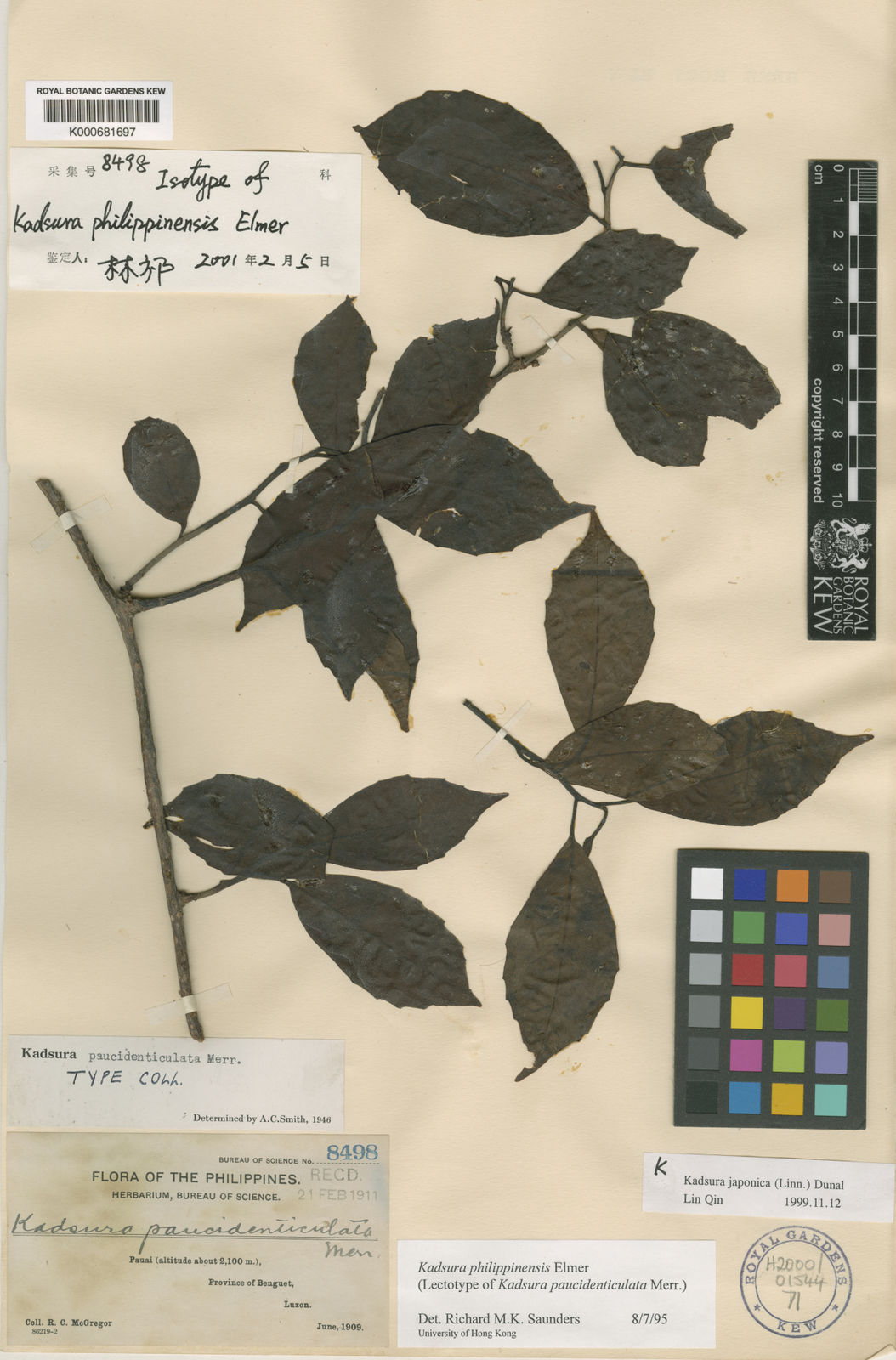

Scientific classification
- Kingdom: Plantae
- Clade: Tracheophytes
- Clade: Angiosperms
- Order: Austrobaileyales
- Family: Schisandraceae
- Genus: Kadsura
- Species: K. philippinensis

Binomial name
- Kadsura philippinensis Elmer.

Synonyms
- Kadsura macgregorii Merr.; Kadsura paucidenticulata Merr.

= Kadsura philippinensis =

Species of flowering plant

Kadsura philippinensis is a flowering plant in the family Schisandraceae.

== Distribution ==
Kadsura philippinensis is native to the wet tropical biome of the Philippines.

== Description ==
Kadsura philippinensis is a climber.

The leaves are more or less papery, and are elliptical, or rarely ovate. The leaves are 7-10cm in length, and 3-5 cm in width. The base of the leaf is wedge-shaped or rounded, and the apex is acute, or tapers to a long point. The leaf edges are smooth or finely toothed. The leaf stalks are 7-15 mm long.

Flowers are borne solitary, and always found on young growth. The flower stalks are 1-3cm long. The fruit stalks are 3-4cm long. The berries, which are kidney-shaped, are white or brown, and have one or two seeds each.
