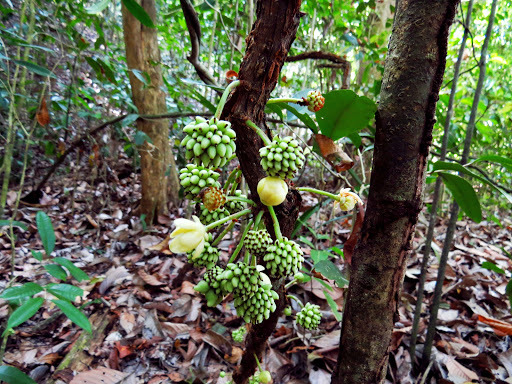

Scientific classification
- Kingdom: Plantae
- Clade: Embryophytes
- Clade: Tracheophytes
- Clade: Angiosperms
- Order: Austrobaileyales
- Family: Schisandraceae
- Genus: Kadsura
- Species: K. scandens

Binomial name
- Kadsura scandens Blume.

Synonyms
- Sarcocarpon scandens Blume.; Kadsura cauliflora Blume.; Kadsura scandens var. cauliflora Blune (Kuntze).; Kadsura scandens var. intermedia Kuntze.; Schisandra ovalifolia P.Parm. P.Parm.

= Kadsura scandens =

Species of flowering plant

Kadsura scandens is a species of flowering plant in the family Schisandraceae.

== Description ==
Kadsura scandens is a climber.

The leaves are leathery and flexible, with an elliptical or ovate shape. The leaves are 10 to 15 cm long, and 5 to 9 cm wide. The leaf stalks are 1 to 3 cm long. Flowers may be solitary, and some grow directly from the trunk. The flower stalks are 1 to 4 cm long. The berries, which do not have stalks, are red when ripe. The berry contains one or two seeds, which may be pear-shaped, disc-shaped, or kidney shaped.

== Distribution ==
Kadsura scandens grows in the wet tropical biome of western Malesia and the lesser Sunda islands.

== Uses ==
Kadsura scandens is used medicinally. Roots and stems can be used to make lotion to treat rheumatism, or as an mucoactive agent. The sap can be drunk to treat diarrhoea, abnominal pain, and urinary issues, or applied topically to treat skin disease. The bark can be used to treat fever.

The fruit is also reported to be edible.
