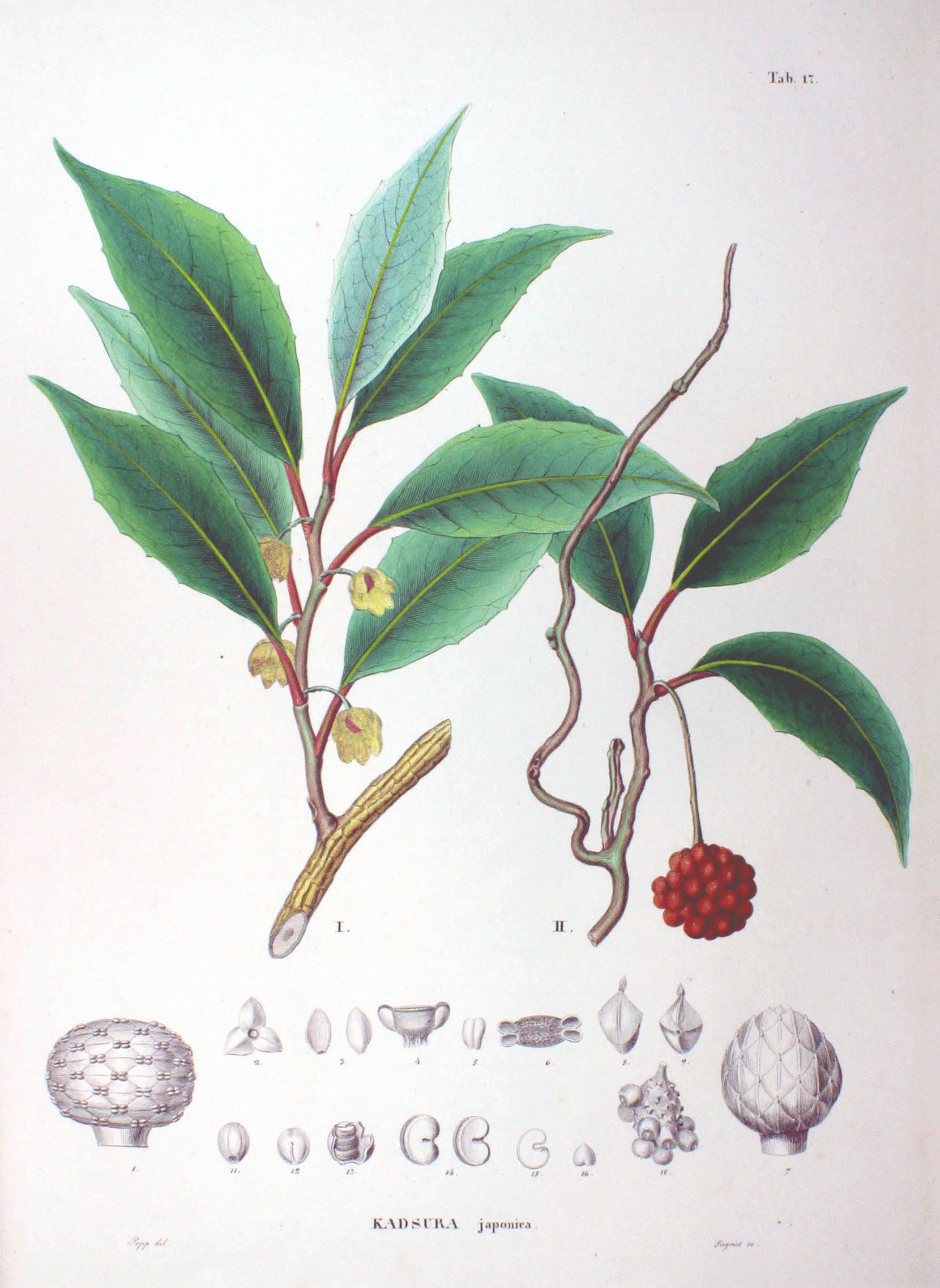

Scientific classification
- Kingdom: Plantae
- Clade: Tracheophytes
- Clade: Angiosperms
- Order: Austrobaileyales
- Family: Schisandraceae
- Genus: Kadsura
- Species: K. japonica

Binomial name
- Kadsura japonica (L.) Dunal.

Synonyms
- Kadsura matsudai Hayata; Uvaria japonica L.

= Kadsura japonica =

Species of flowering plant

Kadsura japonica, commonly known as the kadsura vine or simply kadsura, is a plant species native to Japan (Honshū, Kyūshū and the Ryukyu Islands) in woodlands. The larvae of the moth Caloptilia kadsurae feed on K. japonica in the main Japanese islands and Ryukyu Islands.

== Description ==
Kadsura japonica is a cultivated, dioecious, ornamental plant in gardens, with edible fruits that can be eaten raw or cooked. It grows from 8 feet (2.4 m) to 15 feet (4.6 m). It is an evergreen with deep green, glossy leaves that turn slightly red in autumn. Its fruits are very bright scarlet and it has white, unisexual flowers. This plant contains 1–3 seeds. The apex is acuminate. The leaves are variegated, shiny green and irregularly edged in white. The flowers are cup shaped and have red berries in spring. The petioles are 0.6–2.3 cm long. 5–8 secondary veins can be found on each midvein in the leaves. In common with other plants in the family Schisandraceae, this species can be monoecious although it is often reported as dioecious, and may change sex expressions over time.

== Taxonomy ==
Kadsura japonica was one of the many species first described by Linnaeus in the 10th edition of his Systema Naturae in 1759, originally as Uvaria japonica.

Kadsura is one of the three genera of the family Schisandraceae. It contains 22 species.

== Distribution and habitat ==
It is found in the tropical and subtropical habitats and can be grown as an indoor plant. This plant is found in Japan, southern China, southern Korea and eastern Asia. It can be in habitats such as woodland garden, found in both the sun and shade. It grows in a moderate and fertile soil. It needs a neutral or acidic soil, that is adaptable and well-drained. This plant mostly does not need bright sunlight. In autumn, the shoot of the plant becomes very long and forms layers. It is a climber on woodland trees. It is found at an elevation of 500–2000 m in some provinces of China, Fujian and Taiwan.

== Uses ==
Fruit from this plant is edible and is eaten either raw or cooked. Material extracted from this plant is used for hair dressing. Extracts from this plant are also used for traditional Japanese washi paper making.
