= Amend =

Amend as a verb means to change or modify something, as in:

- Constitutional amendment, a change to the constitution of a nation or a state
- Amend (motion), a motion to modify a pending main motion in parliamentary procedure

Amend as a surname may refer to:

- Bill Amend (born 1962), American cartoonist
- Eric Amend (born 1965), American former tennis player
- Rolf-Dieter Amend (1949–2022), East German slalom canoeist

== See also ==
- Amend, Iran (disambiguation), places in Iran
- "Amends" (1998), episode 10 of season 3 of the television show Buffy the Vampire Slayer
- Amend: The Fight for America (2021), an American docuseries on the Fourteenth Amendment to the United States Constitution
