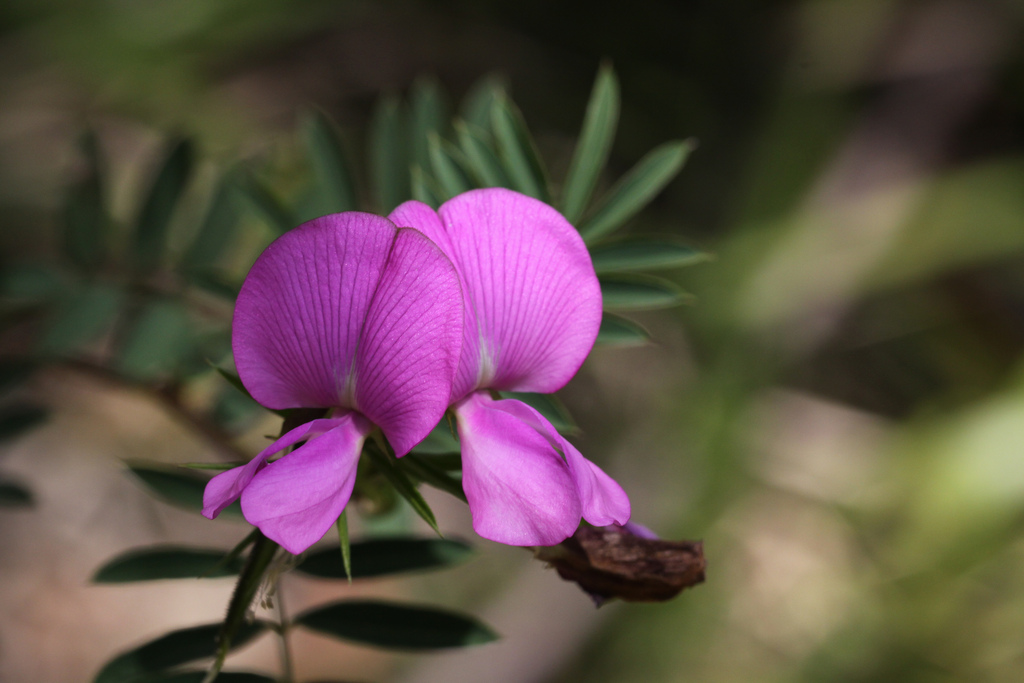

Scientific classification
- Kingdom: Plantae
- Clade: Tracheophytes
- Clade: Angiosperms
- Clade: Eudicots
- Clade: Rosids
- Order: Fabales
- Family: Fabaceae
- Subfamily: Faboideae
- Genus: Swainsona
- Species: S. galegifolia

Binomial name
- Swainsona galegifolia (Andrews) R.Br.

Synonyms
- List: Colutea coronillaefolia Dum.Cours. orth. var.; Colutea coronillifolia (Salisb.) Dum.Cours.; Colutea galegifolia Sims orth. var.; Colutea galegiifolia (Andrews) Sims; Loxidium galegifolium (Andrews) Poir.; Swainsona alba F.T.Hubb.; Swainsona albiflora G.Don; Swainsona albiflora (Lindl.) G.Don nom. illeg.; Swainsona atrococcinea Carrière; Swainsona coronillaefolia Salisb. orth. var.; Swainsona coronillaefolia var. albo-violacea Regel orth. var.; Swainsona coronillaefolia var. purpurea Regel orth. var.; Swainsona coronillifolia Salisb.; Swainsona coronillifolia var. albiflora (Lindl.) Maiden & Betche; Swainsona coronillifolia var. alboviolacea Regel; Swainsona coronillifolia Salisb. var. coronillifolia; Swainsona coronillifolia var. galegifolia (Andrews) Maiden & Betche; Swainsona coronillifolia var. purpurea Regel; Swainsona ferrandi Carrière orth. var.; Swainsona ferrandii F.T.Hubb. orth. var.; Swainsona ferrandii var. alba F.T.Hubb. orth. var.; Swainsona ferrandii var. carminea F.T.Hubb. nom. inval.; Swainsona galegifolia f. albiflora Domin; Swainsona galegifolia f. coronillifolia (F.M.Bailey) Domin; Swainsona galegifolia (Andrews) R.Br. f. galegifolia; Swainsona galegifolia var. alba Hend. & Andr.Hend.; Swainsona galegifolia var. alba Guilf. nom. inval., nom. nud.; Swainsona galegifolia var. albiflora Lindl.; Swainsona galegifolia var. albiflora F.M.Bailey nom. illeg.; Swainsona galegifolia var. coccinea Lindl. nom. inval.; Swainsona galegifolia var. cooperi Guilf. nom. inval., nom. nud.; Swainsona galegifolia var. coronillaefolia F.M.Bailey orth. var.; Swainsona galegifolia var. coronillifolia F.M.Bailey; Swainsona galegifolia var. coronillifolia (Salisb.) C.Moore nom. illeg.; Swainsona galegifolia (Andrews) R.Br. var. galegifolia; Swainsona galegifolia var. microphylla Guilf.; Swainsona galegifolia var. osborni Guilf. nom. inval.; Swainsona galegifolia var. pallida Guilf.; Swainsona galegifolia var. robusta Guilf.; Swainsona galegifolia var. robusta-rosea Guilf.; Swainsona galegifolia var. rosea L.H.Bailey nom. inval., nom. nud.; Swainsona galegifolia var. rosea Guilf. nom. inval., nom. nud.; Swainsona galegifolia var. rosea F.T.Hubb. nom. inval., nom. nud.; Swainsona galegifolia var. violacea L.H.Bailey; Swainsona magnifica Dombrain; Swainsona osborni Hend. & Andr.Hend. orth. var.; Swainsona osborni var. atropurpurea Hend. & Andr.Hend. orth. var.; Swainsona osbornii T.Moore; Swainsona osbornii var. atropurpurea Hend. & Andr.Hend.; Swainsona osbornii T.Moore var. osbornii; Swainsonia coronillifolia F.Muell. orth. var.; Swainsonia ferraudi Anon. nom. inval.; Swainsonia ferraudi f. alba Carrière nom. inval.; Swainsonia galegifolia F.Muell. orth. var.; Vicia galegifolia Andrews

= Swainsona galegifolia =

Smooth Darling pea

Species of legume

Swainsona galegifolia commonly known as smooth Darling pea or Darling pea, is a species of flowering plant in the family Fabaceae and is endemic to Australia. It is a small shrub with greyish-green leaves and flowers in white, red, pink, purple, yellow or orange.

== Description ==
Swainsona galegifolia is an upright, perennial subshrub to about 1 m (3 ft 3 in) high with smooth stems. The grey-green leaves are arranged opposite in pairs of 11-29 leaflets on a petiole, each leaflet is narrowly egg-shaped, 6–20 mm (0.24–0.79 in) long, 2–5 mm (0.079–0.197 in) wide, smooth, apex rounded, notched or occasionally with a small point. The pea-like flowers are borne in racemes of 15-20 white, pink, purple, yellow or orange flowers 12–15 mm (0.47–0.59 in) long. The calyx is smooth, shorter than the floral tube. The standard petal is almost orb-shaped, clawed, up to 15 mm (0.59 in) long, 15–20 mm (0.59–0.79 in) wide, keel 10–15 mm (0.39–0.59 in) long, apex rounded and slightly lipped. Flowering occurs in November and December, the fruit is an elliptic-shaped swollen pod, usually 2–40 mm (0.079–1.575 in) long, 8–12 mm (0.31–0.47 in) wide, smooth and the stipe often more than 10 mm (0.39 in) long.

== Taxonomy and naming ==
The species was first formally described in 1803 by Henry Cranke Andrews as Vicia galegifolia. In 1812 Robert Brown changed the name to Swainsona galegifolia and the change was published in Hortus Kewensis. The specific epithet (galegifolia) refers to the similarity to the northern hemisphere plant galega.

== Distribution and habitat ==
Smooth Darling pea is a widespread species growing in several different habitats in New South Wales, Victoria and Queensland.
