= Schisandra propinqua =

Scientific classification
- Kingdom: Plantae
- Clade: Embryophytes
- Clade: Tracheophytes
- Clade: Spermatophytes
- Clade: Angiosperms
- Order: Austrobaileyales
- Family: Schisandraceae
- Genus: Schisandra
- Species: S. propinqua

Binomial name
- Schisandra propinqua (Wall.) Baill.

Subspecies
- Schisandra propinqua subsp. axillaris; Schisandra propinqua subsp. intermedia; Schisandra propinqua subsp. propinqua; Schisandra propinqua subsp. sinensis

Synonyms
- Kadsura propinqua Wall.; Sphaerostema propinquum (Wall.) Blume

Species of flowering plant

Schisandra propinqua is a species of flowering plant in the family Schisandraceae. It is a climbing plant with papery to leathery leaves, cream to purplish flowers, and edible fruits. The species is native to south-east Asia.

Schisandra propinqua was described in 1824, and has four subspecies.

== Taxonomy ==
Schisandra propinqua was first described in 1824, by Nathaniel Wallich, and placed in the genus Kadsura. In 1830, Carl Ludwig Blume described the species as Sphaerostema propinquum. In 1868, Henri Ernest Baillon described the species under its current name.

Four subspecies are recognised:

- Schisandra propinqua subsp. axillaris (Blume) R.M.K.Saunders - Native to Java and the Lesser Sunda Islands
- Schisandra propinqua subsp. intermedia (A.C.Sm.) R.M.K.Saunders - Native to India, China, Myanmar, and Thailand
- Schisandra propinqua subsp. propinqua - Native to Nepal and the western Himalayas
- Schisandra propinqua subsp. sinensis (Oliv.) R.M.K.Saunders - Native to China and Tibet

== Distribution ==
Schisandra propinqua is native to the temperate biomes of India (Assam), China (north-central, south-central, and south-east), Indonesia (Java and the Lesser Sunda Islands), Myanmar, Nepal, Thailand, and Tibet.

The species grows in mixed forests and open scrublands, at elevations of 400–3,100 metres (1,300–10,200 ft).

== Description ==
Schisandra propinqua is a climbing plant. It is smooth, and has elongated leaf-bearing branches.

The leaves are papery to leathery, elliptical to ovate, 7–11.5 centimetres (2.8–4.5 in) long, and 1–4 centimetres (0.39–1.57 in) wide. The leaf stems are 0.4–2.7 centimetres (0.16–1.06 in) long.

The flowers are solitary or in clusters. The male inflorescences have 2–17 millimetres (0.079–0.669 in) stems, and the female inflorescences have 3–14 millimetres (0.12–0.55 in) stems. The flowers have seven to seventeen tepals, which can be cream, yellow, orange, pink, or purplish. The male flowers have eight to eighteen stamens, and the female flowers have eighteen to fifty-two carpels. The plant flowers from March to September.

The fruit stems are 0.5–3 centimetres (0.20–1.18 in) long. The plant fruits from August to December. The seeds are more or less smooth.

== Uses ==
Schisandra propinqua is used in horticulture and medicine. The fruits are edible.

== Nomenclature ==
In Chinese, the species is known as 合蕊五味子 (hé ruǐ wǔ wèi zǐ), 黃龍藤 (huang long teng), or 鐵箍散 (tie gu san).
