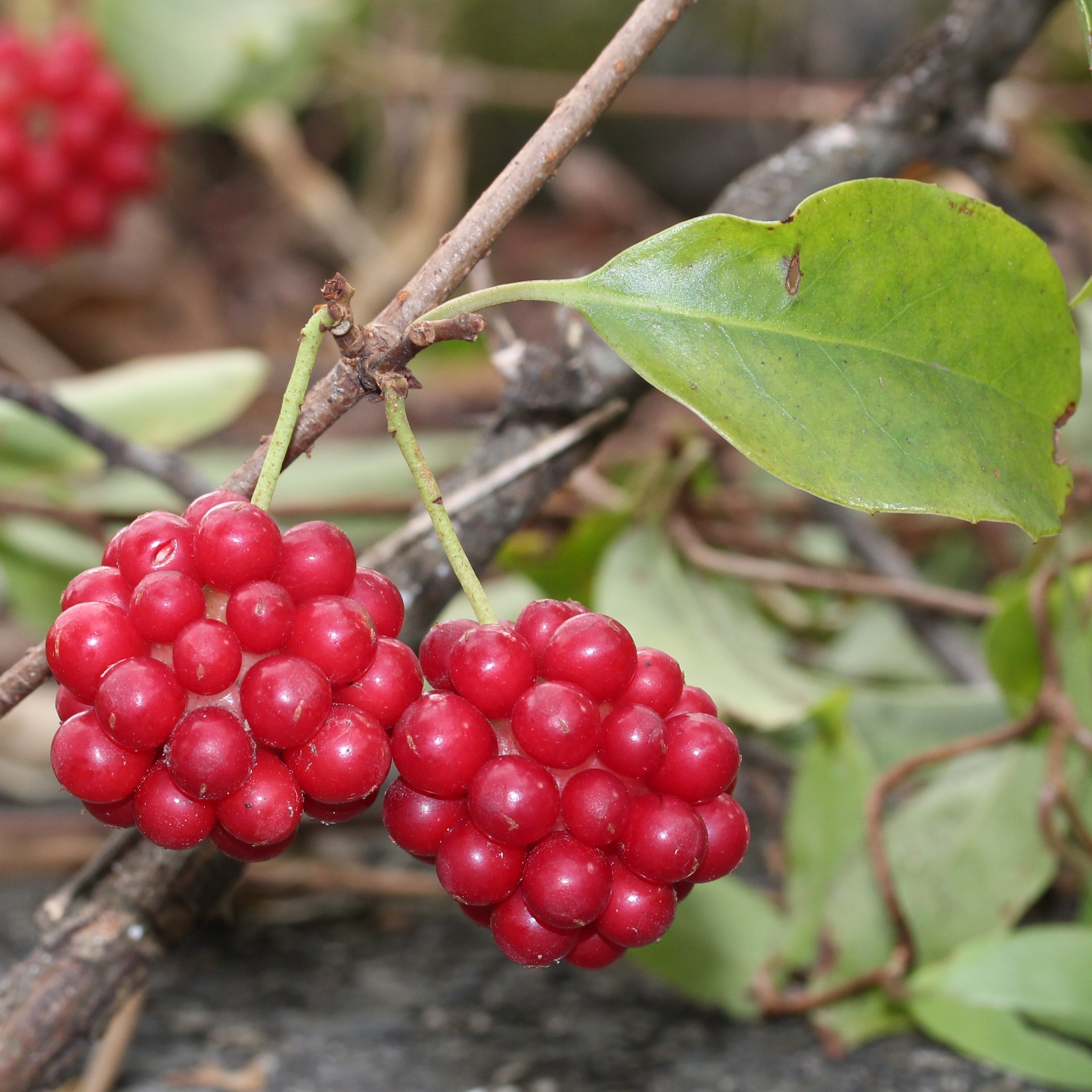
- Kadsura japonica

Scientific classification
- Kingdom: Plantae
- Clade: Embryophytes
- Clade: Tracheophytes
- Clade: Spermatophytes
- Clade: Angiosperms
- Order: Austrobaileyales
- Family: Schisandraceae
- Genus: Kadsura; Kaempf. ex Juss.

Type species
- Kadsura japonica

Synonyms
- Sarcocarpon Blume; Cosbaea Lem.

= Kadsura =

Genus of flowering plants

Kadsura is a genus of flowering plants in the Schisandraceae. All species are native to southern and eastern Asia.

Kadsura are woody vines with simple leaves, and aggregate fruits. The genus includes seventeen species. It was described in 1810, and has historically been confused with Schisandra. Numerous fossil taxa are known, the earlist of which is from the Eocene.

Kadsura are widely used, including for traditional medicine. They are used to treat a variety of ailments, including malaria and kidney disease.

== Distribution ==
Kadsura is native to eastern, southern, and south-eastern Asia. They grow in subtropical, mixed, and montane forests.

== Description ==
Kadsura is a primitive genus, consisting of woody vines.

The leaves are simple, and arranged alternately. Most species are smooth.

Sepals and petals are not differentiated. They may be white, cream, red, yellow, or pink. Some species of the section Sacrocarpon are cauliflorous. The flowers are unisexual and apocarpous. The male flowers vary in form, which is used to define the sections Kadsura and Sarcocarpon. The flowers in these sections are generally cup-shaped.

Kadsura have berry-like aggregate fruits, which each have one to five seeds. The seeds vary in size, from 3–4.5 millimetres (0.12–0.18 in) in K. oblongifolia, to 10–18 millimetres (0.39–0.71 in) in Kadsura coccinea.

== Taxonomy ==
Kadsura was first described as a genus in 1810. It is in the family Schisandraceae. It was formerly placed in the Magnolia family. Kadsura was once considered one of the most primitive groups of flowering plants, though this is not currently accepted.

Kadsura has historically been confused with the genus Schisandra, and many species have been moved between the two genera.

=== Species ===
The genus includes seventeen species. It is divided into three sections.

- Kadsura section Cosbaea
  - Kadsura coccinea (southern China, northern Indochina)
- Kadsura subgenus Kadsura
  - Kadsura subgenus Kadsura section Kadsura
    - Kadsura induta (Yunnan, Guangxi, Vietnam)
    - Kadsura renchangiana (Guangxi)
    - Kadsura heteroclita (China, Indian subcontinent, Indochina, Borneo, Sumatra)
    - Kadsura longipedunculata (China)
    - Kadsura oblongifolia (Guangxi, Guangdong, Hainan)
    - Kadsura japonica (Japan, Korea, Nansei-shoto, Taiwan)
    - Kadsura matsudae (Japan) (Note: Sometimes considered a synonym of K. japonica)
    - Kadsura philippinensis (Philippines)
    - Kadsura angustifolia (Guangxi, Vietnam)
  - Kadsura subgenus Kadsura section Sarcocarpon
    - Kadsura acsmithii (Borneo)
    - Kadsura borneensis (Sabah)
    - Kadsura celebica (Sulawesi)
    - Kadsura lanceolata (Malaysia, Borneo, Sumatra, Sulawesi, Maluku)
    - Kadsura marmorata (Borneo, Philippines)
    - Kadsura scandens (Pen Malaysia, Sumatra, Java, Bali)
    - Kadsura verrucosa (Laos, Vietnam, Pen Malaysia, Sumatra, Java)

These species were formerly included in Kadsura but have now been moved to Schisandra

- K. chinensis - Schisandra chinensis
- K. grandiflora - Schisandra grandiflora
- K. propinqua - Schisandra propinqua

=== Paleobotany ===
The earliest fossils of Kadsura appear in the Eocene. Fossils have been found in North America, Asia, and Europe.

Fossil taxa include:

- Kadsura breddini - Miocene and Oligocene
- Kadsura irregularinervia
- Kadsura lusatica - Miocene
- Kadsura moravica - Miocene
- Kadsura nachterstedtensis
- Kadsura palaeojaponica - Pliocene
- Kadsura protojaponica - Pliocene
- Kadsura protowightiana - Oigocene
- Kadsura senftenbergensis - Miocene and Oligocene
- Kadsura singularis - Miocene

== Uses ==
K. japonica is grown ornamentally. It has also been used in Japan to make hair products, and in paper-making. K. longipedunculata has been used to make rope and fragrant oils.

Various species, including K. coccinea and K. scandens produce edible fruits.

=== Medicine ===
Some of the species in Kadsura are used in traditional medicine. The species include components such as lignans that are biologically active.

The dried fruits of K. japonica are used to treat kidney disease, as stomachics, or as tonics. K. scandens is used for rheumatism, abdominal pain, and fever. In China, K. heteroclita and K. longipedunculata are used against malaria and gastroenteritis.
