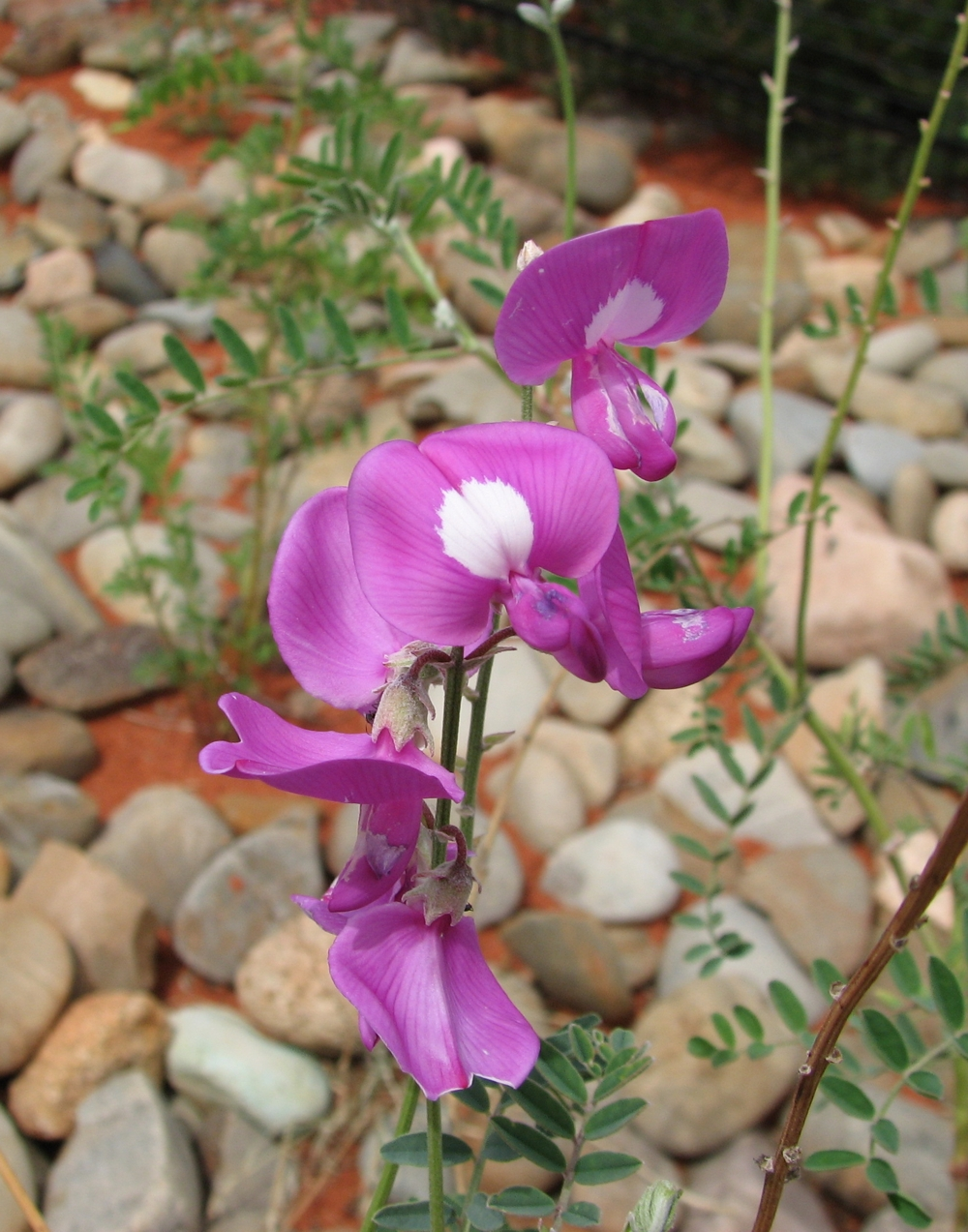

Scientific classification
- Kingdom: Plantae
- Clade: Tracheophytes
- Clade: Angiosperms
- Clade: Eudicots
- Clade: Rosids
- Order: Fabales
- Family: Fabaceae
- Subfamily: Faboideae
- Genus: Swainsona
- Species: S. greyana

Binomial name
- Swainsona greyana Lindl.

Synonyms
- Swainsona grandiflora R.Br.; Swainsona greyana Lindl. subsp. greyana; Swainsona greyana Lindl. var. greyana; Swainsonia greyana F.Muell. orth. var.

= Swainsona greyana =

Species of plant

Swainsona greyana, commonly known as the Darling pea or hairy-Darling pea, is a species of flowering plant in the family Fabaceae and is endemic to south-eastern continental Australia. It is an erect perennial subshrub with imparipinnate leaves with 17 to 21 egg-shaped leaflets, and racemes of 12 to 20 or more white, pink or purple flowers.

== Description ==
Swainsona greyana is an erect perennial subshrub with several hairy stems, that typically grows to a height of up to 1.5 m (4 ft 11 in) or more. Its leaves are imparipinnate 100–150 mm (3.9–5.9 in) long with up to 17 to 21 elliptic to egg-shaped leaflets with the narrower end towards the base, 10–30 mm (0.39–1.18 in) long and 5–10 mm (0.20–0.39 in) wide on a short petiole. There is a stipule 4–10 mm (0.16–0.39 in) long at the base of the petiole. The flowers are arranged in racemes 100–400 mm (3.9–15.7 in) long with 12 to 20 or more flowers on a peduncle 100–400 mm (3.9–15.7 in) long, each flower 15–20 mm (0.59–0.79 in) long in the top half or two-thirds of the peduncle. The sepals are woolly-white and joined at the base, forming a tube 3–5 mm (0.12–0.20 in) long, the sepal lobes much shorter than the tube. The petals are white, pink or purple, the standard petal more or less round, 15–22 mm (0.59–0.87 in) long and wide, the wings 15–21 mm (0.59–0.83 in) long, and the keel 15–22 mm (0.59–0.87 in) long. Flowering occurs from September to March, and the fruit is an elliptic pod 30–50 mm (1.2–2.0 in) long and 8–12 mm (0.31–0.47 in) wide with a stalk about 10 mm (0.39 in) long and the remains of the twisted style about 8 mm (0.31 in) long, containing about 28 heart-shaped seeds.

== Taxonomy ==
Swainsona greyana was first formally described by John Lindley in Edwards's Botanical Register from specimens "sent to the Horticultural Society by his Excellency Captain Grey, from the banks of the Murray in New Holland, where it had been previously found by Sir Thomas Mitchell."

== Distribution and habitat ==
Darling pea occurs on the banks of the lower Murray and Darling Rivers in South Australia, Victoria and New South Wales. It mainly grows in heavy soils on floodplains in the south-east of South Australia, on the slopes and plains of New South Wales, and is rare in Victoria.

== Ecology ==
The plant contains the alkaloid swainsonine causing alpha-mannosidosis, a risk to grazing livestock.

In 2014, thousands of livestock mostly sheep were killed in western New South Wales region, after consuming darling pea, due to its addictive nature. As toxicity builds up it attacks an enzyme involved in metabolism, leading crippling of an animal's central nervous system, and symptoms like erratic behaviour, loss of co-ordination and depression. Previously in January 2013, a bush fire had burnt 53,000 hectares of the Warrumbungle National Park and farms at Coonabarabran leaving the weeds no competition and they rapidly spread in the area.
