= Edward George Henderson =

English botanist, horticulturist and plant taxonomist (1782–1876)

- Born: 1782; London, England
- Died: 4 November 1876 (aged 94); London, England
- Known for: Horticultural nursery business; botanical taxonomy
- Children: Andrew Henderson
- Scientific career
- Fields: Botany, horticulture, taxonomy
- Author abbrev. (botany): Hend.

Edward George Henderson (1782 – 4 November 1876) was an English botanist, horticulturist, plant taxonomist, and curator. He specialized in horticulture and is credited with taxonomically describing 19 plant species, subspecies, and varieties. Eight additional taxa were described jointly with his son, the botanist Andrew Henderson (1823–1906).

Edward George Henderson and his son also operated a nursery business at 1B Wellington Road, St John's Wood, London. The business was known as E. G. Henderson & Son and supplied horticultural products, including seeds and flowering plants.

== Publications ==
- The Illustrated Bouquet: Consisting of Figures with Descriptions of New Flowers. Volume 3. Published by E. G. Henderson & Son.
- E. G. Henderson and Sons Seed List: A Catalogue of Choice and Selected Flower Seeds ... (1863).
