= List of Peperomia species =

The following is a list of all 1411 species in the genus Peperomia which are accepted by Plants of the World Online as of 10 June 2022.

== A ==
- Peperomia abbreviatipes Trel. & Yunck.
- Peperomia abdita Proctor
- Peperomia abnormis Trel.
- Peperomia abrupteacutata Trel. & Yunck.
- Peperomia × abscondita J.W.Moore
- Peperomia abyssinica Miq.
- Peperomia acaulis Alain
- Peperomia aceramarcana Trel.
- Peperomia aceroana C.DC.
- Peperomia acreana C.DC.
- Peperomia acuminata Ruiz & Pav.
- Peperomia acuminatissima Miq.
- Peperomia adamsonia (F.Br.) Yunck.
- Peperomia adenocarpa C.DC.
- Peperomia adscendens C.DC.
- Peperomia adsurgens Yunck.
- Peperomia aerea Trel.
- Peperomia aggregata E.F.Guim. & Carv.-Silva
- Peperomia aguabonitensis Yunck.
- Peperomia aguaditana Trel. & Yunck.
- Peperomia aguilae Trel. & Yunck.
- Peperomia agusanensis C.DC.
- Peperomia ainana Trel.
- Peperomia alata Ruiz & Pav.
- Peperomia alatiscapa Trel.
- Peperomia albert-smithii Trel. & Yunck.
- Peperomia albertiana Yunck.
- Peperomia albidiflora C.DC.
- Peperomia albolineata Trel.
- Peperomia albonervosa G.Mathieu
- Peperomia albopilosa D.Monteiro
- Peperomia albovittata C.DC.
- Peperomia aldrinii Villa
- Peperomia alegrensis Yunck.
- Peperomia alibacophylla Trel. & Yunck.
- Peperomia alismifolia C.Presl
- Peperomia alpina (Sw.) A.Dietr.
- Peperomia alternifolia Yunck.
- Peperomia alwynii Callejas & Betancur
- Peperomia ambiguifolia Trel. & Yunck.
- Peperomia amphitricha Trel.
- Peperomia ampla (Trel.) G.Mathieu
- Peperomia amplexicaulis (Sw.) A.Dietr.
- Peperomia amplexifolia (Link) A.Dietr.
- Peperomia andicola Dahlst.
- Peperomia andina Pino
- Peperomia andrei C.DC.
- Peperomia angularis C.DC.
- Peperomia angustata Kunth
- Peperomia ankaranensis G.Mathieu
- Peperomia anomala Sodiro
- Peperomia antioquiensis Callejas
- Peperomia antoniana Trel.
- Peperomia apiahyensis Yunck.
- Peperomia apodophylla Trel. & Yunck.
- Peperomia apurimacana Trel.
- Peperomia arboricola C.DC.
- Peperomia arborigaudens Trel.
- Peperomia arboriseda C.DC.
- Peperomia arbuscula Yunck.
- Peperomia arctebaccata Trel.
- Peperomia arcuatispica Trel.
- Peperomia arenillasensis Yunck.
- Peperomia areolata Trel.
- Peperomia argenteobracteata Trel. & Yunck.
- Peperomia argyreia (Hook.f.) É.Morren
- Peperomia argyroneura Lauterb.
- Peperomia arifolia Miq.
- Peperomia aristeguietae Steyerm.
- Peperomia armadana C.DC.
- Peperomia armondii Yunck.
- Peperomia armstrongii Villa
- Peperomia aroensis Steyerm.
- Peperomia arthurii Trel. & Yunck.
- Peperomia asarifolia Schltdl. & Cham.
- Peperomia asarifolioides R.García Mart. & Beutelsp.
- Peperomia asperula Hutchison & Rauh
- Peperomia asplundii Yunck.
- Peperomia asterophylla Trel.
- Peperomia astyla Trel.
- Peperomia attenuata Yunck.
- Peperomia augescens Miq.
- Peperomia aurorana Trel. & Standl.
- Peperomia austin-smithii W.C.Burger
- Peperomia australana Yunck.
- Peperomia ayacuchoana Pino & Samain

== B ==
- Peperomia bajana Trel. & Yunck.
- Peperomia balansana C.DC.
- Peperomia balfourii C.DC.
- Peperomia bamleri C.DC.
- Peperomia bangii C.DC.
- Peperomia bangroana C.DC.
- Peperomia barahonana C.DC.
- Peperomia barbarana C.DC.
- Peperomia barbaranoides Yunck.
- Peperomia barbata C.DC.
- Peperomia barbulata (C.DC.) Callejas
- Peperomia barbulipetiola C.DC.
- Peperomia baronii Baker
- Peperomia barryana Callejas
- Peperomia basiradicans G.Mathieu
- Peperomia bavina C.DC.
- Peperomia beccarii C.DC.
- Peperomia beckeri E.F.Guim. & R.J.V.Alves
- Peperomia bella Yunck.
- Peperomia bellatula Yunck.
- Peperomia bellendenkerensis Domin
- Peperomia berlandieri Miq.
- Peperomia bermudezana Trel.
- Peperomia bernhardiana C.DC.
- Peperomia bernieriana Miq.
- Peperomia bernouillii C.DC.
- Peperomia berryi Steyerm.
- Peperomia berteroana Miq.
- Peperomia bethaniana Trel. & Yunck.
- Peperomia biamenta Trel. & Yunck.
- Peperomia bicolor Sodiro
- Peperomia biformis C.DC.
- Peperomia bilobulata C.DC.
- Peperomia bismarckiana C.DC.
- Peperomia biuncialis Kunth
- Peperomia blackii Yunck.
- Peperomia blanda (Jacq.) Kunth
- Peperomia blephariphylla Trel. & Yunck.
- Peperomia blepharipus Trel.
- Peperomia boekei Callejas
- Peperomia boivinii C.DC.
- Peperomia boliviensis C.DC.
- Peperomia boninsimensis Makino
- Peperomia bopiana Trel.
- Peperomia borbonensis Miq.
- Peperomia borburatensis Steyerm.
- Peperomia botterii C.DC.
- Peperomia bourneae C.DC.
- Peperomia brachyphylla (Willd. ex Roem. & Schult.) Sweet
- Peperomia brachypoda Urb.
- Peperomia brachytricha Baker
- Peperomia bracteata A.W.Hill
- Peperomia bracteispica Trel.
- Peperomia bradei Yunck.
- Peperomia brasiliensis (Miq.) Miq.
- Peperomia breedlovei Callejas
- Peperomia brevihirtella Yunck.
- Peperomia breviramula C.DC.
- Peperomia brevispica C.DC.
- Peperomia brittonii C.DC.
- Peperomia brouetiana Trel.
- Peperomia bryophila C.DC.
- Peperomia buchtienii Yunck.
- Peperomia buxifolia Sodiro

== C ==
- Peperomia cacaophila Trel. & Yunck.
- Peperomia cachabiana C.DC.
- Peperomia caducifolia Trel.
- Peperomia caespitosa C.DC.
- Peperomia cainarachiana Yunck.
- Peperomia calcicola Marcusso
- Peperomia caledonica C.DC.
- Peperomia caliginigaudens Trel. & Yunck.
- Peperomia callana Hutchison ex Pino
- Peperomia callophylla Yunck.
- Peperomia calvescens Trel.
- Peperomia calvicaulis C.DC.
- Peperomia calvifolia C.DC.
- Peperomia campana Callejas
- Peperomia campinasana C.DC.
- Peperomia camposii Sodiro
- Peperomia camptotricha Miq.
- Peperomia canalensis C.DC.
- Peperomia canaminana Trel.
- Peperomia candelaber Trel.
- Peperomia candida (Blume) Miq.
- Peperomia caniana Trel.
- Peperomia canlaonensis C.DC.
- Peperomia caperata Yunck.
- Peperomia capitis-bovis Trel.
- Peperomia caraboboensis Steyerm. & Bunting
- Peperomia cardenasii Trel.
- Peperomia carnevalii Steyerm.
- Peperomia carnicaulis C.DC.
- Peperomia carnifolia Yunck.
- Peperomia carpapatana Trel.
- Peperomia carpinterana C.DC.
- Peperomia casapiana C.DC.
- Peperomia casarettoi C.DC.
- Peperomia castelosensis Yunck.
- Peperomia castilloi Verg.-Rodr. & Jimeno-Sevilla
- Peperomia catharinae Miq.
- Peperomia caucana C.DC.
- Peperomia cavaleriei C.DC.
- Peperomia cavispicata G.Mathieu
- Peperomia celiae Yunck.
- Peperomia cerea Trel.
- Peperomia cereoides Pino & Cieza
- Peperomia ceroderma Yunck.
- Peperomia cerrateae Pino & G.Mathieu
- Peperomia chalhuapuquiana Trel.
- Peperomia chanchamayana Trel.
- Peperomia chapensis Steyerm.
- Peperomia chazaroi G.Mathieu & T.Krömer
- Peperomia chicamochana Trel. & Yunck.
- Peperomia chigorodoana Yunck.
- Peperomia chimboana C.DC.
- Peperomia chlorodisca Diels
- Peperomia choritana Trel.
- Peperomia choroniana C.DC.
- Peperomia christophersenii Yunck.
- Peperomia chutanka Pino
- Peperomia ciezae Pino
- Peperomia ciliaris C.DC.
- Peperomia ciliata Kunth
- Peperomia ciliatifolia Trel.
- Peperomia ciliatocaespitosa Carv.-Silva
- Peperomia cilifolia C.DC.
- Peperomia ciliifolia Yunck.
- Peperomia ciliolata Miq.
- Peperomia ciliolibractea C.DC.
- Peperomia ciliosa C.DC.
- Peperomia circinnata Link
- Peperomia cladara Yunck.
- Peperomia claudii C.DC.
- Peperomia claussenii Yunck.
- Peperomia clavatispica Trel. & Yunck.
- Peperomia clavigera Standl. & Steyerm.
- Peperomia claytonioides Kunth
- Peperomia clivicola Yunck.
- Peperomia clivigaudens Yunck.
- Peperomia clusiifolia (Jacq.) Hook.
- Peperomia coatzacoalcosensis Trel.
- Peperomia cobana C.DC.
- Peperomia cochinensis C.DC.
- Peperomia cocleana Trel.
- Peperomia cogniauxii Urb.
- Peperomia collinsii Villa
- Peperomia coloniae Trel.
- Peperomia colorata Kunth
- Peperomia colossina C.DC.
- Peperomia columella Rauh & Hutchison
- Peperomia columnaris Hutchison ex Pino & Klopf.
- Peperomia comaltitlanensis Callejas
- Peperomia comarapana C.DC.
- Peperomia commersonii Baill.
- Peperomia concava Ruiz & Pav.
- Peperomia confertispica Trel.
- Peperomia congerro Trel. & Yunck.
- Peperomia congesta Kunth
- Peperomia congestispica Trel.
- Peperomia congona Sodiro
- Peperomia conjugata Kunth
- Peperomia connixa Trel. & Yunck.
- Peperomia conocarpa Trel.
- Peperomia consoquitlana C.DC.
- Peperomia conturbans Trel. & Yunck.
- Peperomia convexa (Blume) Miq.
- Peperomia cookiana C.DC.
- Peperomia copelandii Quisumb.
- Peperomia coquimbensis Skottsb.
- Peperomia corcovadensis Gardner
- Peperomia cordata Trel. & Yunck.
- Peperomia cordigera Dahlst.
- Peperomia cordovana C.DC.
- Peperomia cordulata C.DC.
- Peperomia cordulatiformis Trel.
- Peperomia cordulilimba C.DC.
- Peperomia coroicoensis Yunck.
- Peperomia costata G.Mathieu
- Peperomia cotoneasterifolia Trel.
- Peperomia cotyledon Benth.
- Peperomia coulteri C.DC.
- Peperomia cowanii Yunck.
- Peperomia crassicaulis Fawc. & Rendle
- Peperomia crassispica Trel.
- Peperomia crassulicaulis Trel.
- Peperomia crinicaulis C.DC.
- Peperomia crinigera Trel.
- Peperomia crispa Sodiro
- Peperomia crispipetiola Trel.
- Peperomia croizatiana Steyerm.
- Peperomia crotalophora Trel.
- Peperomia cruentata Trel.
- Peperomia crusculibacca Trel.
- Peperomia cruzeirensis Carv.-Silva, E.F.Guim. & P.E.A.S.Câmara
- Peperomia crypticola C.DC.
- Peperomia cryptostachya Trel. & Yunck.
- Peperomia crystallina Ruiz & Pav.
- Peperomia cubensis C.DC.
- Peperomia cubugonana Trel. & Yunck.
- Peperomia cuchumatanica Véliz
- Peperomia cumbreana Trel. & Yunck.
- Peperomia cundinamarcana Trel. & Yunck.
- Peperomia cuprea Trel.
- Peperomia cupularis Urb.
- Peperomia curruciformis Trel.
- Peperomia curticaulis Trel.
- Peperomia curtipes Trel.
- Peperomia curtispica C.DC.
- Peperomia cushiana Trel.
- Peperomia cusilluyocana Trel.
- Peperomia cuspidata Dahlst.
- Peperomia cuspidilimba C.DC.
- Peperomia cyclaminoides A.W.Hill
- Peperomia cyclophylla Miq.
- Peperomia cymbifolia Pino

== D ==
- Peperomia daguana Trel. & Yunck.
- Peperomia dahlstedtii C.DC.
- Peperomia damazioi C.DC.
- Peperomia darienensis Callejas
- Peperomia dasystachya Miq.
- Peperomia dauleana C.DC.
- Peperomia davidsoniae Yunck.
- Peperomia debilipes Trel.
- Peperomia deceptrix Trel.
- Peperomia decora Dahlst.
- Peperomia decumbens C.DC.
- Peperomia deficiens Trel.
- Peperomia defoliata C.DC.
- Peperomia degeneri Yunck.
- Peperomia delascioi Steyerm.
- Peperomia delicatula Henschen
- Peperomia dendrophila Schltdl.
- Peperomia densifolia C.DC.
- Peperomia dependens Ruiz & Pav.
- Peperomia deppeana Schltdl. & Cham.
- Peperomia diamantinensis Carv.-Silva, E.F.Guim. & P.E.A.S.Câmara
- Peperomia diaphanoides Dahlst.
- Peperomia dichotoma Regel
- Peperomia dimota Trel. & Yunck.
- Peperomia discifolia Sodiro
- Peperomia discilimba Trel. & Yunck.
- Peperomia discolor (Sw.) G.Don
- Peperomia disjunctiflora Yunck.
- Peperomia dissimilis Kunth
- Peperomia distachyos (L.) A.Dietr.
- Peperomia disticha Yunck.
- Peperomia divaricata Yunck.
- Peperomia diversifolia Kunth
- Peperomia doellii Phil.
- Peperomia dolabella Rauh & Kimnach
- Peperomia dolabriformis Kunth
- Peperomia dominicana C.DC.
- Peperomia donaguiana C.DC.
- Peperomia dondonensis Trel.
- Peperomia dorstenioides Standl. & Steyerm.
- Peperomia dotana Trel.
- Peperomia drapeta Trel.
- Peperomia drusophila C.DC.
- Peperomia dryadum C.DC.
- Peperomia duartei Yunck.
- Peperomia dubia Balle
- Peperomia duendensis Yunck.
- Peperomia duricaulis Trel.
- Peperomia dusenii C.DC.
- Peperomia dyscrita Trel.

== E ==
- Peperomia ebingeri Yunck.
- Peperomia eburnea Linden
- Peperomia ecuadorensis C.DC.
- Peperomia edulis Miq.
- Peperomia eekana C.DC.
- Peperomia effusa Yunck.
- Peperomia efimbriata Trel.
- Peperomia eggersii C.DC.
- Peperomia egleri Yunck.
- Peperomia ekakesara Syam Radh & Nampy
- Peperomia elata C.DC.
- Peperomia elatior G.Mathieu
- Peperomia elegantifolia Trel.
- Peperomia elliptica (Lam.) A.Dietr.
- Peperomia ellipticibacca C.DC.
- Peperomia ellipticorhombea C.DC.
- Peperomia ellsworthii Trel. & Yunck.
- Peperomia elmeri C.DC.
- Peperomia elsana Trel. & Yunck.
- Peperomia emarginata Ruiz & Pav.
- Peperomia emarginatifolia J.Mathew
- Peperomia emarginella (Sw. ex Wikstr.) C.DC.
- Peperomia emarginulata C.DC.
- Peperomia emiliana C.DC.
- Peperomia enckeifolia Trel.
- Peperomia endlichii C.DC.
- Peperomia enenyasensis Trel.
- Peperomia enervis F.Muell.
- Peperomia epidendron C.DC.
- Peperomia epilobioides Trel. & Yunck.
- Peperomia epipetrica Callejas
- Peperomia epipremnifolia D.Monteiro & Leitman
- Peperomia erosa Hutchison ex Pino
- Peperomia erythrocaulis G.Mathieu
- Peperomia erythropremna Trel.
- Peperomia erythrospicata Callejas
- Peperomia erythrostachya Trel.
- Peperomia esmeraldana C.DC.
- Peperomia esperanzana Trel.
- Peperomia espinosae Yunck.
- Peperomia estaminea C.DC.
- Peperomia estrellana Trel.
- Peperomia ewanii Trel. & Yunck.
- Peperomia exclamationis G.Mathieu
- Peperomia exigua (Blume) Miq.
- Peperomia exiguispica Trel.
- Peperomia exilamenta Trel.
- Peperomia exiliramea Trel.
- Peperomia expallescens C.DC.

== F ==
- Peperomia fagerlindii Yunck.
- Peperomia falanana Trel. & Yunck.
- Peperomia falcata Yunck.
- Peperomia falconensis Steyerm.
- Peperomia falsa A.W.Hill
- Peperomia famelica Trel.
- Peperomia farctifolia Trel. & Yunck.
- Peperomia fawcettii C.DC.
- Peperomia fendleriana C.DC.
- Peperomia fernandeziana Miq.
- Peperomia fernandopoiana C.DC.
- Peperomia ferreyrae Yunck.
- Peperomia ficta Trel.
- Peperomia filicaulis C.DC.
- Peperomia filiformis Ruiz & Pav.
- Peperomia fissicola Trel.
- Peperomia fissispica Trel.
- Peperomia flabilis Trel.
- Peperomia flavamenta Trel.
- Peperomia flavescens C.DC.
- Peperomia flavescentifolia Trel.
- Peperomia flavida C.DC.
- Peperomia flexicaulis Wawra
- Peperomia flexinervia Yunck.
- Peperomia fluviatilis Yunck.
- Peperomia foliata Trel.
- Peperomia foliiflora Ruiz & Pav.
- Peperomia foliosa Kunth
- Peperomia folsomii Callejas
- Peperomia fosbergii Yunck.
- Peperomia fournieri C.DC.
- Peperomia foveolata Steyerm.
- Peperomia fragilis Yunck.
- Peperomia fragilissima Trel.
- Peperomia fragrans C.DC.
- Peperomia fragrantissima Trel. & Yunck.
- Peperomia franciscoi Callejas
- Peperomia fraseri C.DC.
- Peperomia fruticetorum C.DC.
- Peperomia fuertesii C.DC.
- Peperomia fugax C.DC.
- Peperomia fulvescens Yunck.
- Peperomia fundacionensis Steyerm.
- Peperomia furcata Opiz
- Peperomia fuscipunctata Yunck.
- Peperomia fuscispica C.DC.
- Peperomia futunaensis H.St.John

== G ==
- Peperomia gabinetensis Trel. & Yunck.
- Peperomia galapagensis Hook.f. ex Miq.
- Peperomia galioides Kunth
- Peperomia garcia-barrigana Trel. & Yunck.
- Peperomia gardneriana Miq.
- Peperomia gaultheriifolia Sodiro
- Peperomia gayi C.DC.
- Peperomia gedehana C.DC.
- Peperomia gehrigeri Trel. & Yunck.
- Peperomia gemella Miq.
- Peperomia geminispica Trel. & Yunck.
- Peperomia gentryi Steyerm.
- Peperomia gerardoi Callejas
- Peperomia gibba C.DC.
- Peperomia gigantea G.Mathieu
- Peperomia giralana Cuatrec.
- Peperomia glabella (Sw.) A.Dietr.
- Peperomia glabrilimba C.DC.
- Peperomia glabrirhachis Trel.
- Peperomia glandulosa C.DC.
- Peperomia glareosa Trel.
- Peperomia glassmanii Yunck.
- Peperomia glauca (Pino) Pino
- Peperomia glaziovii C.DC.
- Peperomia gleicheniiformis Trel.
- Peperomia globosibacca C.DC.
- Peperomia globulanthera C.DC.
- Peperomia gorgonillana Trel. & Yunck.
- Peperomia goudotii Miq.
- Peperomia gracieana Görts
- Peperomia gracilicaulis Yunck.
- Peperomia gracilis Dahlst.
- Peperomia gracilispica G.Mathieu
- Peperomia gracillima S.Watson
- Peperomia grantii Yunck.
- Peperomia granulata Trel. & Yunck.
- Peperomia granulatifolia Trel.
- Peperomia granulatilimba Trel.
- Peperomia granulosa Trel.
- Peperomia graveolens Rauh & Barthlott
- Peperomia grayumii Callejas
- Peperomia griggsii C.DC.
- Peperomia grisarii C.DC.
- Peperomia grisebachii C.DC.
- Peperomia griseoargentea Yunck.
- Peperomia gruendleri C.DC.
- Peperomia guadaloupensis C.DC.
- Peperomia guadalupana Trel. & Yunck.
- Peperomia guaiquinimana Trel. & Yunck.
- Peperomia guanensis Trel.
- Peperomia guapilesiana Trel.
- Peperomia guarujana C.DC.
- Peperomia guatemalensis C.DC.
- Peperomia guayrapurana Trel.
- Peperomia gucayana Trel.
- Peperomia gutierrezana Yunck.
- Peperomia guttulata Sodiro
- Peperomia gymnophylla C.DC.

== H ==
- Peperomia hadrostachya Yunck.
- Peperomia haematolepis Trel.
- Peperomia haenkeana Opiz
- Peperomia hallieri C.DC.
- Peperomia hamiltonianifolia Trel.
- Peperomia hammelii Grayum
- Peperomia harlingii Yunck.
- Peperomia harmandii C.DC.
- Peperomia harrisii C.DC.
- Peperomia hartmannii C.DC.
- Peperomia hartwegiana Miq.
- Peperomia haughtii Trel. & Yunck.
- Peperomia hebetata Trel. & Yunck.
- Peperomia hedyotidea Ridl.
- Peperomia hemmendorffii Yunck.
- Peperomia hendersonensis Yunck.
- Peperomia heptaphylla Suwanph. & Hodk.
- Peperomia hernandiifolia (Vahl) A.Dietr.
- Peperomia herrerae Trel.
- Peperomia herzogii C.DC.
- Peperomia hesperomannii Wawra
- Peperomia heterodoxa Standl. & Steyerm.
- Peperomia heterophylla Miq.
- Peperomia heterostachya A.Dietr.
- Peperomia heyneana Miq.
- Peperomia hilariana Miq.
- Peperomia hildebrandtii Vatke ex C.DC.
- Peperomia hintonii Yunck.
- Peperomia hirta C.DC.
- Peperomia hirtella Miq.
- Peperomia hirtellicaulis Yunck.
- Peperomia hirticaulis C.DC.
- Peperomia hirtipeduncula C.DC.
- Peperomia hirtipetiola C.DC.
- Peperomia hispidosa Dahlst.
- Peperomia hispidula (Sw.) A.Dietr.
- Peperomia hispiduliformis Trel.
- Peperomia hobbitoides T.Wendt
- Peperomia hodgei Yunck.
- Peperomia hoelscheri H.J.P.Winkl.
- Peperomia hoffmannii C.DC.
- Peperomia hombronii C.DC.
- Peperomia honigii Steyerm.
- Peperomia huacapistanana Trel.
- Peperomia huallagana Trel.
- Peperomia huantana Trel.
- Peperomia huanucoana Trel.
- Peperomia huatuscoana C.DC.
- Peperomia huberi C.DC.
- Peperomia humbertii G.Mathieu
- Peperomia humifusa Yunck.
- Peperomia humilis A.Dietr.
- Peperomia hunteriana P.I.Forst.
- Peperomia hutchisonii Yunck.
- Peperomia hydnostachya (Trel.) Callejas
- Peperomia hydrocotyloides Miq.
- Peperomia hygrophiloides C.DC.
- Peperomia hylophila C.DC.
- Peperomia hypoleuca Miq.
- Peperomia hyporhoda Trel.

== I ==
- Peperomia ibiramana Yunck.
- Peperomia ilaloensis Sodiro
- Peperomia imerinae C.DC.
- Peperomia immolata Trel. & Yunck.
- Peperomia inaequalifolia Ruiz & Pav.
- Peperomia inaequalilimba C.DC.
- Peperomia inaequilatera Trel.
- Peperomia incana (Haw.) Hook.
- Peperomia incisa Trel.
- Peperomia incognita Callejas
- Peperomia inconspicua C.DC.
- Peperomia increscens Miq.
- Peperomia induratifolia Trel.
- Peperomia infralutea Trel. & Yunck.
- Peperomia infravillosa Trel.
- Peperomia inquilina Hemsl.
- Peperomia insueta Trel.
- Peperomia involucrata Sodiro
- Peperomia irrasa G.Mathieu
- Peperomia itatiaiana Yunck.
- Peperomia itayana Trel.

== J ==
- Peperomia jalcaensis Pino
- Peperomia jamaicana Yunck.
- Peperomia jamesoniana C.DC.
- Peperomia japonica Makino
- Peperomia josei Yunck.
- Peperomia junghuhniana Miq.
- Peperomia juniniana Trel.
- Peperomia juruana C.DC.

== K ==
- Peperomia kalimatina C.DC.
- Peperomia kamerunana C.DC.
- Peperomia kerinciensis I.M.Turner
- Peperomia kimnachii Rauh
- Peperomia kipahuluensis H.H.St.John & Lamoureux
- Peperomia kjellii G.Mathieu
- Peperomia klopfensteinii Pino & Cieza
- Peperomia klotzschiana Miq.
- Peperomia klugiana Trel. & Yunck.
- Peperomia kokeana Yunck.
- Peperomia kotana C.DC.
- Peperomia kraemeri C.DC.
- Peperomia kravangensis Miq.
- Peperomia kuhliana Miq.
- Peperomia kuntzei C.DC.
- Peperomia kusaiensis Hosok.

== L ==
- Peperomia laeteviridis Engl.
- Peperomia laevifolia (Blume) Miq.
- Peperomia laevilimba Yunck.
- Peperomia lagunaensis C.DC.
- Peperomia lanaoensis C.DC.
- Peperomia lanceolata C.DC.
- Peperomia lanceolatopeltata C.DC.
- Peperomia lancifolia Hook.
- Peperomia lanosa Trel.
- Peperomia lanuginosa Pino
- Peperomia lasierrana Trel. & Yunck.
- Peperomia lasiophylla C.DC.
- Peperomia lasiorhachis C.DC.
- Peperomia lasiostigma C.DC.
- Peperomia latibracteata Quisumb.
- Peperomia latifolia Miq.
- Peperomia latilimba Yunck.
- Peperomia latimerana C.DC.
- Peperomia lauterbachii K.Schum.
- Peperomia lawrancei Trel. & Yunck.
- Peperomia laxiflora Kunth
- Peperomia ledermannii C.DC.
- Peperomia lehmannii C.DC.
- Peperomia leptophylla Miq.
- Peperomia leptostachya Hook. & Arn.
- Peperomia leptostachyoides C.DC.
- Peperomia leucanthera C.DC.
- Peperomia leucorrhachis Sodiro ex C.DC.
- Peperomia leucostachya C.DC.
- Peperomia lewisii Proctor
- Peperomia liclicensis Pino & Klopf.
- Peperomia liebmannii C.DC.
- Peperomia liesneri Steyerm.
- Peperomia lifuana C.DC.
- Peperomia lignescens C.DC.
- Peperomia ligustrina Hillebr.
- Peperomia lilliputiana (Pino & Cieza) Pino
- Peperomia limana Trel. & Standl.
- Peperomia linaresii Véliz
- Peperomia lindeniana Miq.
- Peperomia lineatipila A.Rich.
- Peperomia litana Trel. & Yunck.
- Peperomia loefgrenii Yunck.
- Peperomia lonchophylloides C.DC.
- Peperomia longepedunculata Opiz
- Peperomia longipetiolata Trel. & Yunck.
- Peperomia longipila C.DC.
- Peperomia longisetosa Callejas
- Peperomia lorentzii C.DC.
- Peperomia loucoubeana C.DC.
- Peperomia loxensis Kunth
- Peperomia lyallii C.DC.
- Peperomia lyman-smithii Yunck.

== M ==
- Peperomia macbrideana Trel.
- Peperomia macedoana Yunck.
- Peperomia macraeana C.DC.
- Peperomia macrandra C.DC.
- Peperomia macrorhiza Kunth
- Peperomia macrorostrum Callejas
- Peperomia macrostachyos (Vahl) A.Dietr.
- Peperomia macrothyrsa Miq.
- Peperomia macrotricha C.DC.
- Peperomia maculosa (L.) Hook.
- Peperomia madagascariensis C.DC.
- Peperomia maestrana Trel.
- Peperomia magnifoliiflora G.Mathieu
- Peperomia magnoliifolia (Jacq.) A.Dietr.
- Peperomia maguirei Yunck.
- Peperomia maijeri Pino & Samain
- Peperomia majalis Trel.
- Peperomia mameiana C.DC.
- Peperomia manabina C.DC.
- Peperomia manarae Steyerm.
- Peperomia mandioccana Miq.
- Peperomia mantadiana G.Mathieu
- Peperomia mantaroana Pino
- Peperomia marahuacensis Steyerm.
- Peperomia maransara Trel.
- Peperomia marcapatana Trel.
- Peperomia marchionensis F.Br.
- Peperomia marcoana C.DC.
- Peperomia margaritifera Bertero ex Hook.
- Peperomia mariannensis C.DC.
- Peperomia marivelesana C.DC.
- Peperomia marmorata Hook.f.
- Peperomia marshalliana Trel.
- Peperomia martiana Miq.
- Peperomia masuthoniana Suwanph. & Chantar.
- Peperomia mathewsiana Miq.
- Peperomia mathieui Pino & Samain
- Peperomia matlalucaensis C.DC.
- Peperomia mauiensis Wawra
- Peperomia maxonii C.DC.
- Peperomia maxwellana C.DC.
- Peperomia maypurensis Kunth
- Peperomia meeboldii C.DC.
- Peperomia megalepis Trel.
- Peperomia megalopoda Trel.
- Peperomia megapotamica Dahlst.
- Peperomia melanokirrocarpa Gilli
- Peperomia melanosticta Sodiro
- Peperomia melinii Yunck.
- Peperomia membranacea Hook. & Arn.
- Peperomia mercedana C.DC.
- Peperomia meridana Yunck.
- Peperomia merrillii C.DC.
- Peperomia mesitasana Trel. & Yunck.
- Peperomia metallica L.Linden & Rodigas
- Peperomia metcalfii Trel. & Yunck.
- Peperomia mexicana (Miq.) Miq.
- Peperomia microlepis Trel.
- Peperomia micromamillata Trel.
- Peperomia micromerioides Sodiro
- Peperomia microphylla Kunth
- Peperomia microphyllophora Trel. & Yunck.
- Peperomia microstachya C.DC.
- Peperomia millei Sodiro
- Peperomia mindoroensis C.DC.
- Peperomia minensis Henschen
- Peperomia minuta A.W.Hill
- Peperomia miqueliana C.DC.
- Peperomia mishuyacana Trel.
- Peperomia mitchelioides Sodiro
- Peperomia mitoensis Pino & Samain
- Peperomia mixtifolia Trel. ex Callejas
- Peperomia mocoana Yunck.
- Peperomia mocquerysii C.DC.
- Peperomia modicilimba C.DC.
- Peperomia molleri C.DC.
- Peperomia mollicaulis C.DC.
- Peperomia mollis Kunth
- Peperomia mollisoides Yunck.
- Peperomia monostachya Ruiz & Pav.
- Peperomia montana C.DC.
- Peperomia montecristana Trel.
- Peperomia monticola Miq.
- Peperomia moralesii Véliz
- Peperomia moreliana Yunck.
- Peperomia morungavana Yunck.
- Peperomia mosenii Dahlst.
- Peperomia moulmeiniana C.DC.
- Peperomia moyobambana (C.DC.) C.DC.
- Peperomia multifolia Yunck.
- Peperomia multiformis Trel.
- Peperomia multispica C.DC.
- Peperomia multisurcula Suwanph. & Hodk.
- Peperomia muscicola Ridl.
- Peperomia muscigaudens C.DC.
- Peperomia muscipara Trel. & Yunck.
- Peperomia muscophila C.DC.
- Peperomia mutilata Trel.
- Peperomia myrtifolia (Vahl) A.Dietr.

== N ==
- Peperomia naevifolia Trel.
- Peperomia naitasiriensis Yunck.
- Peperomia nakaharae Hayata
- Peperomia namosiana Yunck.
- Peperomia nandalana Yunck.
- Peperomia nandarivatensis Yunck.
- Peperomia naranjoana C.DC.
- Peperomia naviculifolia Trel.
- Peperomia neblinana Yunck.
- Peperomia negrosensis C.DC.
- Peperomia nequejahuirana Trel.
- Peperomia nervosovenosa (Blume) Miq.
- Peperomia nicolliae G.Mathieu
- Peperomia nigricans Trel.
- Peperomia nigro-oculata Trel.
- Peperomia nigroungulata Trel. & Yunck.
- Peperomia nitida Dahlst.
- Peperomia nivalis Miq.
- Peperomia nizaitoensis C.DC.
- Peperomia nodosa Yunck.
- Peperomia non-alata Trel.
- Peperomia nopalana G.Mathieu
- Peperomia nossibeana C.DC.
- Peperomia novemnervia C.DC.
- Peperomia nudicaulis C.DC.
- Peperomia nudifolia C.DC.
- Peperomia nummularioides Griseb.

== O ==
- Peperomia oahuensis C.DC.
- Peperomia obcordata C.Presl
- Peperomia obcordatifolia Trel.
- Peperomia obex Trel.
- Peperomia oblancifolia Yunck.
- Peperomia obliqua Ruiz & Pav.
- Peperomia obovalifolia Callejas
- Peperomia obovalis Trel. & Yunck.
- Peperomia obovatilimba C.DC.
- Peperomia obruenda Trel.
- Peperomia obscurifolia C.DC.
- Peperomia obtusifolia (L.) A.Dietr.
- Peperomia occulta G.Mathieu
- Peperomia ocoana Ekman ex Trel.
- Peperomia ocrosensis G.Mathieu & Pino
- Peperomia ocumarana Trel. & Yunck.
- Peperomia oerstedii C.DC.
- Peperomia olafiana Trel.
- Peperomia olivacea C.DC.
- Peperomia oliveri J.Florence & W.L.Wagner
- Peperomia ollantaitambona Trel.
- Peperomia ophistachyera Gilli
- Peperomia orbiculimba Yunck.
- Peperomia oreophila Henschen
- Peperomia oscarii Trel. & Yunck.
- Peperomia ottoniana Kunth ex Miq.
- Peperomia ouabianae C.DC.
- Peperomia ovatolanceolata Trel. & Yunck.
- Peperomia ovatopeltata C.DC.
- Peperomia oxycarpa C.DC.
- Peperomia oxyphylla C.DC.

== P ==
- Peperomia pachiteana Trel.
- Peperomia pachydermis C.DC.
- Peperomia pachystachya C.DC.
- Peperomia painteri Trel.
- Peperomia pakipski C.DC.
- Peperomia palcana C.DC.
- Peperomia pallens Kunth
- Peperomia pallescens Miq.
- Peperomia pallida (G.Forst.) A.Dietr.
- Peperomia pallidibacca C.DC.
- Peperomia pallidinervis C.DC.
- Peperomia palmana C.DC.
- Peperomia palmiformis Pino & Samain
- Peperomia palmirensis C.DC.
- Peperomia pampalcana Trel.
- Peperomia pandiana C.DC.
- Peperomia pangerangoana C.DC.
- Peperomia papillispica C.DC.
- Peperomia papillosa Dahlst.
- Peperomia paradoxa Diels
- Peperomia paramuna Callejas
- Peperomia parasitica C.DC.
- Peperomia parastriata G.Mathieu
- Peperomia parcicilia C.DC.
- Peperomia parcifolia C.DC.
- Peperomia parcipeltata G.Mathieu
- Peperomia parhamii Yunck.
- Peperomia pariensis Steyerm.
- Peperomia parnassiifolia Miq.
- Peperomia parva Trel.
- Peperomia parvibacca C.DC.
- Peperomia parvibractea C.DC.
- Peperomia parvicaulis C.DC.
- Peperomia parvifolia C.DC.
- Peperomia parvilimba C.DC.
- Peperomia parvipunctulata Trel.
- Peperomia parvisagittata G.Mathieu & Pino
- Peperomia parvulifolia Trel.
- Peperomia pasionana Trel. ex G.Mathieu
- Peperomia patula C.DC.
- Peperomia pavoniana C.DC.
- Peperomia pearcei Trel.
- Peperomia peckelii C.DC.
- Peperomia pecuniifolia Trel. & Standl.
- Peperomia pedicellata Dahlst.
- Peperomia pedunculata C.DC.
- Peperomia pellucida (L.) Kunth
- Peperomia pellucidoides Yunck.
- Peperomia pellucidopunctulata C.DC.
- Peperomia peltaphylla Trel. & Yunck.
- Peperomia peltifolia C.DC.
- Peperomia peltigera C.DC.
- Peperomia peltilimba C.DC. ex Trel.
- Peperomia peltoidea Kunth
- Peperomia pendulicaulis C.DC.
- Peperomia penduliramea Yunck.
- Peperomia penicillata C.DC.
- Peperomia pentadactyla Yunck.
- Peperomia peploides Kunth
- Peperomia percalvescens Trel.
- Peperomia perciliata Yunck.
- Peperomia pereirae Yunck.
- Peperomia pereneana Trel.
- Peperomia pereskiifolia (Jacq.) Kunth
- Peperomia perforata Opiz
- Peperomia perglandulosa Yunck.
- Peperomia perherbacea Trel.
- Peperomia perlongicaulis Yunck.
- Peperomia perlongipedunculata Trel. & Yunck.
- Peperomia perlongipes C.DC.
- Peperomia perlongispica Yunck.
- Peperomia pernambucensis Miq.
- Peperomia perodiniana Trel.
- Peperomia persuculenta Yunck.
- Peperomia persulcata Yunck.
- Peperomia pertomentella Trel.
- Peperomia peruviana Dahlst.
- Peperomia petiolaris C.DC.
- Peperomia petiolata Hook.f.
- Peperomia petraea C.DC.
- Peperomia petrophila C.DC.
- Peperomia philipsonii Yunck.
- Peperomia phyllanthopsis Trel. & Yunck.
- Peperomia physostachya G.Mathieu
- Peperomia pichinchae C.DC.
- Peperomia pichisensis Trel.
- Peperomia pilicaulis C.DC.
- Peperomia pilifera Trel.
- Peperomia pilipetiolata Callejas
- Peperomia pillahuatana Trel.
- Peperomia pilosa Ruiz & Pav.
- Peperomia pilostigma Yunck.
- Peperomia pinedoana Trel.
- Peperomia pinoi G.Mathieu
- Peperomia piresii Yunck.
- Peperomia pitcairnensis C.DC.
- Peperomia pitiguayana Trel.
- Peperomia pittieri C.DC.
- Peperomia playapampana Trel.
- Peperomia pleiomorpha Trel.
- Peperomia plicata Opiz
- Peperomia plicatifolia Trel.
- Peperomia plurispica Trel.
- Peperomia pluvisilvatica G.Mathieu
- Peperomia poasana C.DC.
- Peperomia poeppigii Miq.
- Peperomia polybotrya Kunth
- Peperomia polycephala Trel.
- Peperomia polymorpha Trel.
- Peperomia polystachya (Aiton) Hook.
- Peperomia polystachyoides Dahlst.
- Peperomia polzii Rauh ex Bogner
- Peperomia ponapensis C.DC.
- Peperomia pongoana Trel.
- Peperomia pontina Trel.
- Peperomia popayanensis Trel. & Yunck.
- Peperomia porphyridea Diels
- Peperomia porriginifera Trel. & Yunck.
- Peperomia portobellensis Beurl.
- Peperomia portoricensis Urb.
- Peperomia portuguesensis Steyerm.
- Peperomia portulacoides (Lam.) A.Dietr.
- Peperomia potamophila Callejas
- Peperomia ppucu-ppucu Trel.
- Peperomia praematura Trel. & Yunck.
- Peperomia praeruptorum Trel.
- Peperomia pringlei C.DC.
- Peperomia proctorii Yunck.
- Peperomia procumbens C.DC.
- Peperomia productamenta Trel.
- Peperomia profissa Trel.
- Peperomia prolifera Yunck.
- Peperomia propugnaculi Trel.
- Peperomia prostrata B.S.Williams ex Mast. & T.Moore
- Peperomia pseudoalpina Trel.
- Peperomia pseudoalternifolia Trel. & Yunck.
- Peperomia pseudoasarifolia Callejas & G.Mathieu
- Peperomia pseudobcordata Yunck.
- Peperomia pseudocasaretti C.DC.
- Peperomia pseudocobana Yunck.
- Peperomia pseudoelata Callejas
- Peperomia pseudoestrellensis C.DC.
- Peperomia pseudofurcata C.DC.
- Peperomia pseudoglabella Steyerm.
- Peperomia pseudohirta Callejas
- Peperomia pseudohodgei Callejas
- Peperomia pseudomaculosa Callejas
- Peperomia pseudopereskiifolia C.DC.
- Peperomia pseudoperuviana (Pino) Pino
- Peperomia pseudophyllantha Samain
- Peperomia pseudorhombea C.DC.
- Peperomia pseudorhynchophoros C.DC.
- Peperomia pseudorufescens C.DC.
- Peperomia pseudosalicifolia Trel.
- Peperomia pseudoserratirhachis D.Monteiro
- Peperomia pseudoumbilicata Yunck.
- Peperomia pseudovariegata C.DC.
- Peperomia pseudoverruculosa G.Mathieu
- Peperomia psilophylla C.DC.
- Peperomia psilostachya C.DC.
- Peperomia pteroneura C.DC.
- Peperomia puberulescens Callejas
- Peperomia puberulibacca C.DC.
- Peperomia puberulicaulis Trel. & Yunck.
- Peperomia puberuliformis Trel.
- Peperomia puberulilimba C.DC.
- Peperomia puberulipes Trel.
- Peperomia puberulirhachis C.DC.
- Peperomia puberulispica C.DC.
- Peperomia pubescens Ruiz & Pav.
- Peperomia pubescentinervis Trel.
- Peperomia pubicaulis C.DC.
- Peperomia pubilimba C.DC.
- Peperomia pubinervosa Trel.
- Peperomia pubipeduncula Yunck.
- Peperomia pubipetiola C.DC.
- Peperomia pubiramea Trel.
- Peperomia pubirhachis Yunck.
- Peperomia puerto-ospinana Trel. & Yunck.
- Peperomia pugnicaudex Pino
- Peperomia pulchella (Aiton) A.Dietr.
- Peperomia pullispica Trel.
- Peperomia pululaguana C.DC.
- Peperomia pumila Opiz
- Peperomia punctatilamina Trel. & Yunck.
- Peperomia punctulatissima Trel.
- Peperomia punicea Dahlst.
- Peperomia purpurea Ruiz & Pav.
- Peperomia purpureonervosa G.Mathieu
- Peperomia purpurinervis C.DC.
- Peperomia purpurinodis Yunck.
- Peperomia purpurispicata Callejas
- Peperomia pusilla Callejas
- Peperomia putlaensis G.Mathieu
- Peperomia putumayoensis Trel. & Yunck.
- Peperomia pyramidata Sodiro
- Peperomia pyrifolia Bonpl.

== Q ==
- Peperomia quadrangularis (J.V.Thomps.) A.Dietr.
- Peperomia quadratifolia Trel.
- Peperomia quadricoma Trel.
- Peperomia quadrifolia (L.) Kunth
- Peperomia quaerata Trel.
- Peperomia quaesita Trel.
- Peperomia quaifei C.DC.
- Peperomia querocochana G.Mathieu & Pino
- Peperomia questionis G.Mathieu
- Peperomia quimiriana Trel.
- Peperomia quispicanchiana Trel.

== R ==
- Peperomia racemifolia Trel.
- Peperomia radiatinervosa G.Mathieu
- Peperomia radicosa Yunck.
- Peperomia ramboi Yunck.
- Peperomia rapensis F.Br.
- Peperomia ratticaudata G.Mathieu
- Peperomia rauniensis O.Schwartz
- Peperomia rechingerae C.DC.
- Peperomia recurvata (Blume) Miq.
- Peperomia reflexa Kunth
- Peperomia regelii C.DC.
- Peperomia reineckei C.DC.
- Peperomia remyi C.DC.
- Peperomia renifolia Dahlst.
- Peperomia reptans C.DC.
- Peperomia reptilis C.DC.
- Peperomia reticulata Balf.f.
- Peperomia retivenulosa Yunck.
- Peperomia retropuberula Yunck.
- Peperomia retusa (L.f.) A.Dietr.
- Peperomia rhexiifolia Moritzi ex C.DC.
- Peperomia rhodophylla Trel.
- Peperomia rhombea Ruiz & Pav.
- Peperomia rhombeifolia Trel.
- Peperomia rhombeoelliptica Trel.
- Peperomia rhombifolia Trel.
- Peperomia rhombiformis Trel.
- Peperomia rhombilimba Trel.
- Peperomia rhomboidea Hook. & Arn.
- Peperomia ricaurtensis Yunck.
- Peperomia richardsonii G.Mathieu
- Peperomia ridleyi C.DC.
- Peperomia riedeliana Regel
- Peperomia rigidicaulis C.DC.
- Peperomia rioblancoana Trel. & Yunck.
- Peperomia riocaliensis Trel. & Yunck.
- Peperomia riparia Yunck.
- Peperomia ripicola C.DC.
- Peperomia rivulamans Silverst.
- Peperomia rivulorum C.DC.
- Peperomia rizzinii Yunck.
- Peperomia robleana Trel. & Yunck.
- Peperomia robusta G.Mathieu
- Peperomia robustior (Dahlst.) Urb.
- Peperomia rockii C.DC.
- Peperomia rodriguesiana Balf.f.
- Peperomia rosea Trel.
- Peperomia roseopetiolata Callejas
- Peperomia rossii Rendle ex Baker f.
- Peperomia rosulatiformis Yunck.
- Peperomia rotumaensis H.St.John
- Peperomia rotundata Kunth
- Peperomia rotundifolia (L.) Kunth
- Peperomia rotundilimba C.DC.
- Peperomia roxburghiana (Schult.) A.Dietr.
- Peperomia rubea Trel.
- Peperomia rubens Trel.
- Peperomia rubescens C.DC.
- Peperomia rubramenta Trel. & Yunck.
- Peperomia rubricaulis (Nees) A.Dietr.
- Peperomia rubrifolia Trel.
- Peperomia rubrimaculata C.DC.
- Peperomia rubrinodis Kunth & C.D.Bouché
- Peperomia rubripetiola Trel.
- Peperomia rubrivenosa C.DC.
- Peperomia rubropunctulata C.DC.
- Peperomia rufescens C.DC.
- Peperomia rufescentifolia Trel.
- Peperomia rufispica Yunck.
- Peperomia rugata Trel.
- Peperomia rugatifolia Trel.
- Peperomia rugosa C.C.Berg, E.A.Mennega & Tolsma
- Peperomia rupiceda C.DC.
- Peperomia rupicola C.DC.
- Peperomia rupigaudens C.DC.
- Peperomia rurrenabaqueana Trel.
- Peperomia rusbyi C.DC.
- Peperomia ruscifolia Kunth

== S ==
- Peperomia sabaletasana Yunck.
- Peperomia sachatzinzumba Trel. & Yunck.
- Peperomia sagittata G.Mathieu
- Peperomia saintpauliella Grayum
- Peperomia salaminana Trel. & Yunck.
- Peperomia salangonis Trel. & Yunck.
- Peperomia salicifolia C.DC.
- Peperomia saligna Kunth
- Peperomia salmonicolor Trel.
- Peperomia samainiae Pino
- Peperomia samoensis Warb.
- Peperomia san-carlosiana C.DC.
- Peperomia san-felipensis C.DC.
- Peperomia san-joseana C.DC.
- Peperomia san-roqueana Trel.
- Peperomia sanblasensis Callejas
- Peperomia sandemanii Yunck.
- Peperomia sandwicensis Miq.
- Peperomia sangabanensis Trel.
- Peperomia sanquininiana Trel. & Yunck.
- Peperomia sansalvadorana C.DC.
- Peperomia santa-elisae C.DC.
- Peperomia santa-helenae Trel.
- Peperomia santanderiana Trel. & Yunck.
- Peperomia santiagoana Trel.
- Peperomia sarasinii C.DC.
- Peperomia saxicola C.DC.
- Peperomia scabiosa Trel.
- Peperomia schenckiana Dahlst.
- Peperomia schizandra Trel.
- Peperomia schlechteri Lauterb.
- Peperomia schmidtii C.DC.
- Peperomia schneepeana D.Parodi
- Peperomia schultzei Trel. & Yunck.
- Peperomia schunkeana Trel.
- Peperomia schwackei C.DC.
- Peperomia sclerophylla Trel.
- Peperomia scopulorum Trel.
- Peperomia scutaleifolia Trel.
- Peperomia scutellariifolia Sodiro
- Peperomia scutellifolia Ruiz & Pav.
- Peperomia scutifolia C.DC.
- Peperomia scutilimba Yunck.
- Peperomia secunda Ruiz & Pav.
- Peperomia seemanniana Miq.
- Peperomia segregata T.S.Dantas, Carv.-Silva & P.E.A.S.Câmara
- Peperomia seibertii Trel.
- Peperomia selenophylla Pino & Cieza
- Peperomia seleri C.DC.
- Peperomia semimetralis C.DC.
- Peperomia semipuberula Trel. & Yunck.
- Peperomia seposita Trel.
- Peperomia septemnervis Ruiz & Pav.
- Peperomia septentrionalis S.Br.
- Peperomia serpens (Sw.) G.Don
- Peperomia serratirhachis Yunck.
- Peperomia sierpeana Callejas
- Peperomia silvarum C.DC.
- Peperomia silvicola C.DC.
- Peperomia silvivaga C.DC.
- Peperomia similis Britton
- Peperomia simplex Desv.
- Peperomia simulans C.DC.
- Peperomia simuliformis Callejas
- Peperomia sincorana C.DC.
- Peperomia sirindhorniana Suwanph. & Chantar.
- Peperomia sirupayana C.DC.
- Peperomia skottsbergii C.DC.
- Peperomia smithiana C.DC.
- Peperomia smithii Trel.
- Peperomia sneidernii Yunck.
- Peperomia societatis J.W.Moore
- Peperomia socorronis Trel.
- Peperomia sodiroi C.DC.
- Peperomia soratana C.DC.
- Peperomia soukupii Trel.
- Peperomia spathophylla Dahlst.
- Peperomia spathulata Ham.
- Peperomia spathulifolia Small
- Peperomia sphaerostachya G.Mathieu
- Peperomia spiculata Trel.
- Peperomia spiritus-sancti E.F.Guim. & Carv.-Silva
- Peperomia spruceana Benth. ex C.DC.
- Peperomia sprucei C.DC.
- Peperomia steinbachii Yunck.
- Peperomia stelechophila C.DC.
- Peperomia stellata (Sw.) A.Dietr.
- Peperomia stenocarpa Regel
- Peperomia stenostachya C.DC.
- Peperomia stevensii Trel.
- Peperomia steyermarkii Yunck.
- Peperomia stilifera Yunck.
- Peperomia stipitifolia Trel.
- Peperomia stolonifera Kunth
- Peperomia strawii Hutchison ex Pino & Klopf.
- Peperomia striata Ruiz & Pav.
- Peperomia stroemfeltii Dahlst.
- Peperomia stuebelii C.DC.
- Peperomia suaveolens Ham.
- Peperomia subalata C.DC.
- Peperomia subandina Trel.
- Peperomia subblanda C.DC.
- Peperomia subcalvescens Trel.
- Peperomia subelongata C.DC.
- Peperomia subemarginata Yunck.
- Peperomia subflaccida Yunck.
- Peperomia sublaxiflora C.DC.
- Peperomia subpallescens C.DC.
- Peperomia subpetiolata Yunck.
- Peperomia subpilosa Yunck.
- Peperomia subretusa Yunck.
- Peperomia subroseispica C.DC.
- Peperomia subrotunda (Haw.) A.Dietr.
- Peperomia subrotundifolia C.DC.
- Peperomia subrubescens Yunck.
- Peperomia subrubricaulis C.DC.
- Peperomia subrubrispica C.DC.
- Peperomia subsericata Trel.
- Peperomia subsetifolia Yunck.
- Peperomia subspathulata Yunck.
- Peperomia subternifolia Yunck.
- Peperomia subvillicaulis Trel.
- Peperomia succulenta C.DC.
- Peperomia suchitanensis Trel. & Standl.
- Peperomia sucumbiosensis Yunck.
- Peperomia sulbahiensis D.Monteiro & M.Coelho
- Peperomia sulcata C.DC.
- Peperomia sumidoriana C.DC.
- Peperomia suratana Trel. & Yunck.
- Peperomia suspensa C.DC.
- Peperomia swartziana Miq.
- Peperomia sylvatica C.DC.
- Peperomia sylvestris C.DC.
- Peperomia sympodialis Trel. & Yunck.
- Peperomia syringifolia C.DC.

== T ==
- Peperomia tablahuasiana C.DC.
- Peperomia talinifolia Kunth
- Peperomia tamayoi Trel. & Yunck.
- Peperomia tambitoensis Trel. & Yunck.
- Peperomia tamboana Yunck.
- Peperomia tanalensis Baker
- Peperomia tancitaroana Trel. ex Viccon & G.Mathieu
- Peperomia tarapotana C.DC.
- Peperomia tatei Yunck.
- Peperomia tejana Trel. & Yunck.
- Peperomia tenae Trel. & Yunck.
- Peperomia tenella (Sw.) A.Dietr.
- Peperomia tenelliformis Trel.
- Peperomia tenerrima Schltdl. & Cham.
- Peperomia tenuicaulis C.DC.
- Peperomia tenuiflora Opiz
- Peperomia tenuifolia C.DC.
- Peperomia tenuilimba C.DC.
- Peperomia tenuimarginata Trel. & Yunck.
- Peperomia tenuipeduncula C.DC.
- Peperomia tenuipes Trel.
- Peperomia tenuipila C.DC.
- Peperomia tenuiramea C.DC.
- Peperomia tenuissima C.DC.
- Peperomia tepoztecoana G.Mathieu
- Peperomia tequendamana Trel.
- Peperomia terebinthina G.Mathieu
- Peperomia teresitensis Trel.
- Peperomia ternata C.DC.
- Peperomia terraegaudens Trel. & Yunck.
- Peperomia tetragona Ruiz & Pav.
- Peperomia tetraphylla (G.Forst.) Hook. & Arn.
- Peperomia tetraquetra Sodiro
- Peperomia teysmannii C.DC.
- Peperomia theodori Trel.
- Peperomia thienii Yunck.
- Peperomia thollonii C.DC.
- Peperomia thomeana C.DC.
- Peperomia thorelii C.DC.
- Peperomia ticunhuayana Trel.
- Peperomia tillettii Steyerm.
- Peperomia timbuchiana Trel.
- Peperomia tjibodasana C.DC.
- Peperomia tlapacoyoensis C.DC.
- Peperomia toledoana Callejas
- Peperomia tolimensis Trel. & Yunck.
- Peperomia tomentella Trel. & Yunck.
- Peperomia tomentosa A.Dietr.
- Peperomia tominana C.DC.
- Peperomia tonduzii C.DC.
- Peperomia tooviiana J.Florence
- Peperomia topoensis Yunck.
- Peperomia toroi Trel. & Yunck.
- Peperomia tovariana C.DC.
- Peperomia tradescantiifolia O.Schwartz
- Peperomia transparens Miq.
- Peperomia trianae C.DC.
- Peperomia trichobracteata G.Mathieu & T.Krömer
- Peperomia trichocarpa Miq.
- Peperomia trichomanoides Grayum
- Peperomia trichophylla Baker
- Peperomia trichopus Trel.
- Peperomia tricolor Trel.
- Peperomia trifolia (L.) A.Dietr.
- Peperomia trinervis Ruiz & Pav.
- Peperomia trinervula C.DC.
- Peperomia trineura Miq.
- Peperomia trineuroides Dahlst.
- Peperomia triplinervis Sodiro
- Peperomia tristachya Kunth
- Peperomia trollii Hutchison & Rauh
- Peperomia tropaeoloides Sodiro
- Peperomia trujilloi Steyerm.
- Peperomia truncicola C.DC.
- Peperomia truncigaudens C.DC.
- Peperomia trunciseda C.DC.
- Peperomia truncivaga C.DC.
- Peperomia tsakiana C.DC.
- Peperomia tuberculata Yunck.
- Peperomia tubericordata G.Mathieu
- Peperomia tuberosa Opiz
- Peperomia tuerckheimii C.DC.
- Peperomia tuisana C.DC.
- Peperomia tumida Sodiro
- Peperomia tungurahuae Sodiro
- Peperomia turbinata Dahlst.
- Peperomia turboensis Yunck.
- Peperomia turialvensis C.DC.
- Peperomia tutensis Callejas
- Peperomia tutunendoana Trel. & Yunck.

== U ==
- Peperomia uaupesensis Yunck.
- Peperomia ubate-susanensis Yunck.
- Peperomia udimontana Trel. & Yunck.
- Peperomia udisilvestris C.DC.
- Peperomia umbilicata Ruiz & Pav.
- Peperomia umbrigaudens Yunck.
- Peperomia umbrosa G.Mathieu
- Peperomia uncatispica Trel.
- Peperomia undeninervia C.DC.
- Peperomia unduavina C.DC.
- Peperomia unifoliata Callejas
- Peperomia unispicata Callejas
- Peperomia urbani Trel.
- Peperomia urocarpa Fisch. & C.A.Mey.
- Peperomia ursina Grayum
- Peperomia urvilleana A.Rich.

== V ==
- Peperomia valladolidana Yunck.
- Peperomia vallensis Trel. & Yunck.
- Peperomia valliculae Trel.
- Peperomia vana Trel.
- Peperomia vareschii Yunck.
- Peperomia variculata Trel.
- Peperomia variifolia C.DC.
- Peperomia variilimba G.Mathieu
- Peperomia vazquezii G.Mathieu & Verg.-Rodr.
- Peperomia vellarimalica J.Mathew & P.M.Salim
- Peperomia velloziana Miq.
- Peperomia velutina Linden & André
- Peperomia venabulifolia Trel.
- Peperomia veneciana Trel. & Yunck.
- Peperomia venezueliana C.DC.
- Peperomia venosa Yunck.
- Peperomia ventenatii Miq.
- Peperomia ventricosicarpa Trel.
- Peperomia venulosa Yunck.
- Peperomia venusta Yunck.
- Peperomia veraguana Callejas
- Peperomia verediana Trel.
- Peperomia verruculosa Dahlst. ex A.W.Hill
- Peperomia verschaffeltii Linden
- Peperomia versicolor Trel.
- Peperomia versteegii C.DC.
- Peperomia verticillata (L.) A.Dietr.
- Peperomia verticillatispica Trel. & Yunck.
- Peperomia vestita C.DC.
- Peperomia vidaliana Trel.
- Peperomia villarrealii Yunck.
- Peperomia villicaulis C.DC.
- Peperomia villipetiola C.DC.
- Peperomia villosa C.DC.
- Peperomia vinasiana C.DC.
- Peperomia vincentiana Miq.
- Peperomia violacea C.DC.
- Peperomia viracochana Trel.
- Peperomia vitiana C.DC.
- Peperomia vitilevuensis Yunck.
- Peperomia vueltasana Trel.
- Peperomia vulcanica Baker & C.H.Wright
- Peperomia vulcanicola C.DC.

== W ==
- Peperomia warmingii C.DC.
- Peperomia weberbaueri C.DC.
- Peperomia wernerrauhii Pino & Samain
- Peperomia wheeleri Britton
- Peperomia wibomii Yunck.
- Peperomia williamsii C.DC.
- Peperomia wolfgang-krahnii Rauh
- Peperomia woytkowskii Yunck.
- Peperomia wrayi C.DC.

== X ==
- Peperomia xalana G.Mathieu

== Y ==
- Peperomia yabucoana Urb. & C.DC.
- Peperomia yanacachiana Yunck.
- Peperomia yananoensis Trel.
- Peperomia yapasana Trel.
- Peperomia yatuensis Steyerm.
- Peperomia yeracuiana Trel. & Yunck.
- Peperomia yungasana C.DC.
- Peperomia yutajensis Steyerm.

== Z ==
- Peperomia zarzalana Trel. & Yunck.
- Peperomia zipaquirana Trel. & Yunck.
- Peperomia zongolicana Jimeno-Sevilla & Verg.-Rodr.
