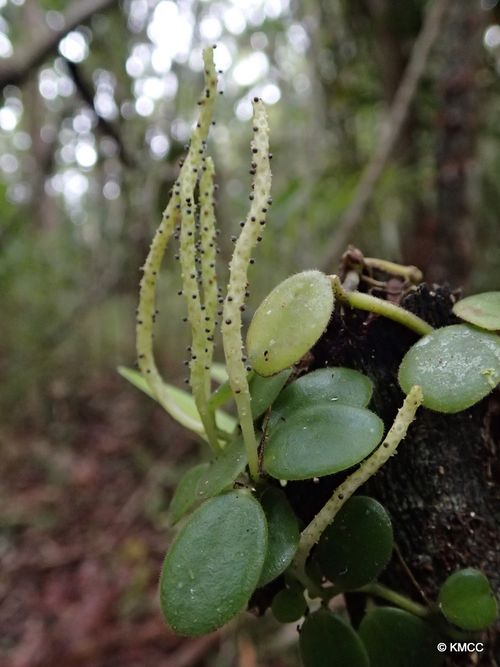

Scientific classification
- Kingdom: Plantae
- Clade: Embryophytes
- Clade: Tracheophytes
- Clade: Angiosperms
- Clade: Magnoliids
- Order: Piperales
- Family: Piperaceae
- Genus: Peperomia
- Species: P. trichophylla

Binomial name
- Peperomia trichophylla Baker

Synonyms
- Peperomia forsythii C.DC.; Peperomia trichopoda C.DC.

= Peperomia trichophylla =

Species of plant

Peperomia trichophylla is a species of epiphyte in the genus Peperomia. It was first described by John Gilbert Baker and published in the book "Journal of the Linnean Society, Botany 21: 436. 1885.". It primarily grows on wet tropical biomes. The species name came from the English word wikt:tricho- + wikt:phyllon, which means Hairy leaf. Its Conservation Status is Threatened.

== Description ==
Weak, flexible, and heavily pilose stems. Leaf with a 1 1/2–2 inch long blade.

When held up to the light, the midrib and lateral veins, as well as the anastomosing connecting veinlets, are clearly apparent; the petiole is between 1/2 and 3/4 inches long. The leaf is oblong at the apex, cuneate in the lower half, and membranous in texture. It is dark green and pubescent on both surfaces. On short, slender peduncles that grow to be 3–4 inches long, spikes are generated from the axils of the leaves. The stigma is sessile and globose, and the ovary is ascending and glabrous, inserted into the sulcate rhachis' grooves.

== Distribution ==
It is endemic to Madagascar.
