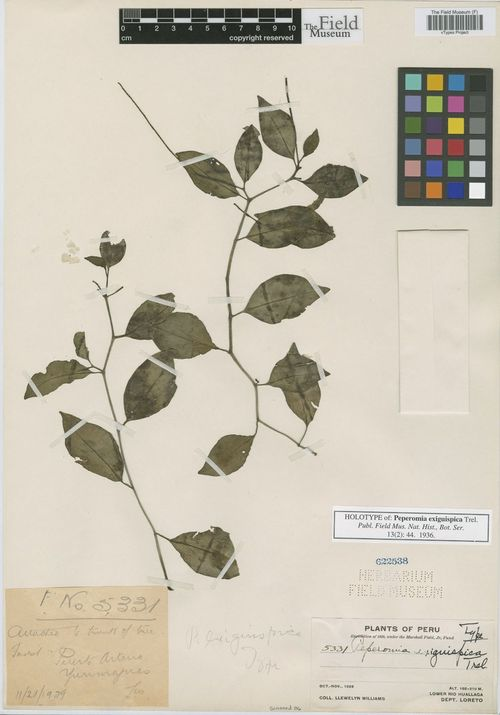

Scientific classification
- Kingdom: Plantae
- Clade: Tracheophytes
- Clade: Angiosperms
- Clade: Magnoliids
- Order: Piperales
- Family: Piperaceae
- Genus: Peperomia
- Species: P. exiguispica

Binomial name
- Peperomia exiguispica Trel.

= Peperomia exiguispica =

Species of flowering plant

Peperomia exiguispica is a species of epiphyte in the genus Peperomia that is endemic in Peru. It grows on wet tropical biomes. Its conservation status is Threatened.

== Description ==
The type specimen were collected near Puerto Arturo, Peru, at an altitude of 155–210 meters (509–689 ft).

Peperomia exiguispica is a slender, mostly unbranched, rather large, glabrous, tree-dwelling herb with a stem 2–3 mm thick. The alternate leaves are lanceolate-elliptic, somewhat acute at both ends, measuring 4–5 cm long and 2–3 cm wide. They are obscurely 5-nerved, with a glandular-granular texture on the underside, and dry to an opaque finish. The petiole is 10 mm long. The spikes are very slender, 90 mm long, and borne on a 10 mm peduncle.

== Taxonomy and naming ==
It was described in 1936 by William Trelease in Publications of the Field Museum of Natural History, Botanical Series 13, from specimens collected by Llewelyn Williams. It got its epithet from the Latin exiguus + spica, referring to the very slender, thin spikes.

== Distribution and habitat ==
It is endemic in Peru. It grows on a epiphyte environment and is a herb. It grows on wet tropical biomes.

== Conservation ==
This species is assessed as Threatened, in a preliminary report.
