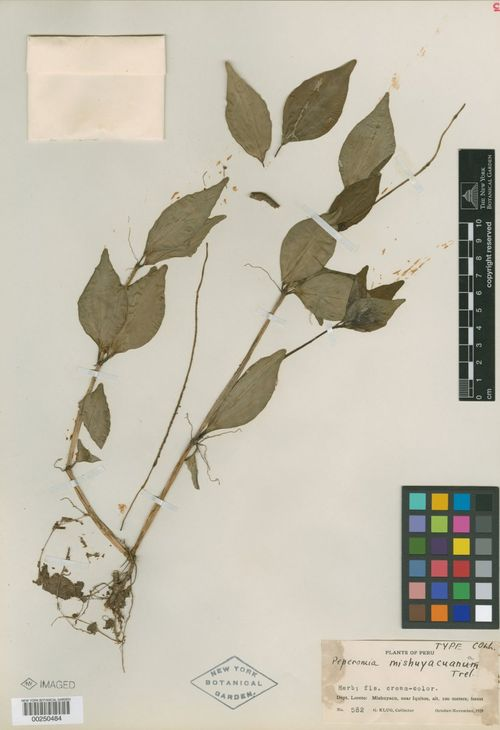

Scientific classification
- Kingdom: Plantae
- Clade: Tracheophytes
- Clade: Angiosperms
- Clade: Magnoliids
- Order: Piperales
- Family: Piperaceae
- Genus: Peperomia
- Species: P. mishuyacana

Binomial name
- Peperomia mishuyacana Trel.

= Peperomia mishuyacana =

Species of flowering plant

Peperomia mishuyacana is a species of terrestrial or epiphytic herb in the genus Peperomia that is native to Peru. It grows on wet tropical biomes. Its conservation status is Threatened.

== Description ==
The type specimen were collected at Mishuyacu, Peru, at an altitude of 100 meters (330 ft) above sea level.

Peperomia mishuyacana is a rather large, creeping, glabrous herb, though the nodes may be sparsely puberulous. The stem is 2–8 mm thick. The leaves are opposite or in whorls of 3. They are ovate, somewhat bluntly acuminate, with an acute base, measuring 5–6 cm long and 2.5–3 cm wide. They are 3–5-nerved, and when dry are somewhat thin, opaque, with an olive-green, minutely granular underside. The petiole is 5 mm long. The inflorescence was not seen on the type specimen.

== Taxonomy and naming ==
It was described in 1936 by William Trelease in Publications of the Field Museum of Natural History, Botanical Series 13, from specimens collected by Guillermo Klug.

The epithet is derived from the type locality.

== Distribution and habitat ==
It is native to Peru. It grows as a terrestrial or epiphytic herb. It grows on wet tropical biomes.

== Conservation ==
This species is assessed as Threatened, in a preliminary report.
