= Peperomia lehmannii =

Conservation status
- Endangered (IUCN 3.1)

Scientific classification
- Kingdom: Plantae
- Clade: Tracheophytes
- Clade: Angiosperms
- Clade: Magnoliids
- Order: Piperales
- Family: Piperaceae
- Genus: Peperomia
- Species: P. lehmannii

Binomial name
- Peperomia lehmannii C. DC.

Species of flowering plant

Peperomia lehmannii is a species of plant belonging to the Piperaceae family. It is endemic to Ecuador.
