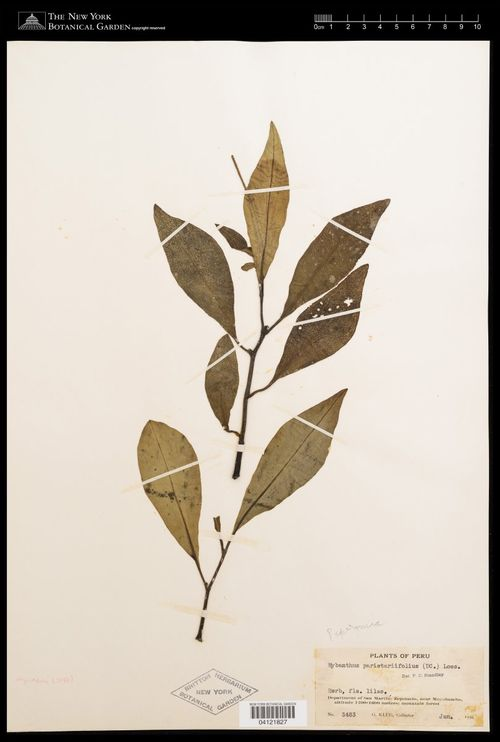

Scientific classification
- Kingdom: Plantae
- Clade: Tracheophytes
- Clade: Angiosperms
- Clade: Magnoliids
- Order: Piperales
- Family: Piperaceae
- Genus: Peperomia
- Species: P. elegantifolia

Binomial name
- Peperomia elegantifolia Trel.

= Peperomia elegantifolia =

Species of flowering plant

Peperomia elegantifolia is a species of epiphyte in the genus Peperomia that is endemic in Peru. It grows on wet tropical biomes. Its conservation status is Threatened.

== Description ==
The type specimen were collected near San Roque, Peru, at an altitude of 1,350–1,500 meters (4,430–4,920 ft).

Peperomia elegantifolia is a medium-sized, glabrous, forest-dwelling herb. The alternate leaves are lanceolate to typically lanceolate-obovate, somewhat acute, with a cuneate base, measuring 9–10 cm (3.5–3.9 in) long and 3–4.5 cm (1.2–1.8 in) wide. They are pinnately nerved from the lower half. The petiole is barely 1 cm long. The spikes are borne in pairs in the axils on slender peduncles. The branching structure is complex: a main peduncle about 3 cm long may bear the spikes, or a longer peduncle may terminate in a reduced leaf and then the spikes. The ultimate peduncles bearing the spikes are 5–10 mm long.

== Taxonomy and naming ==
It was described in 1936 by William Trelease in Publications of the Field Museum of Natural History, Botanical Series 13, from specimens collected by Llewelyn Williams. It got its epithet from the Latin wikt:elegans + wikt:folia, referring to the plant's elegant foliage.

== Distribution and habitat ==
It is endemic in Peru. It grows on a epiphyte environment and is a herb. It grows on wet tropical biomes.

== Conservation ==
This species is assessed as Threatened, in a preliminary report.
