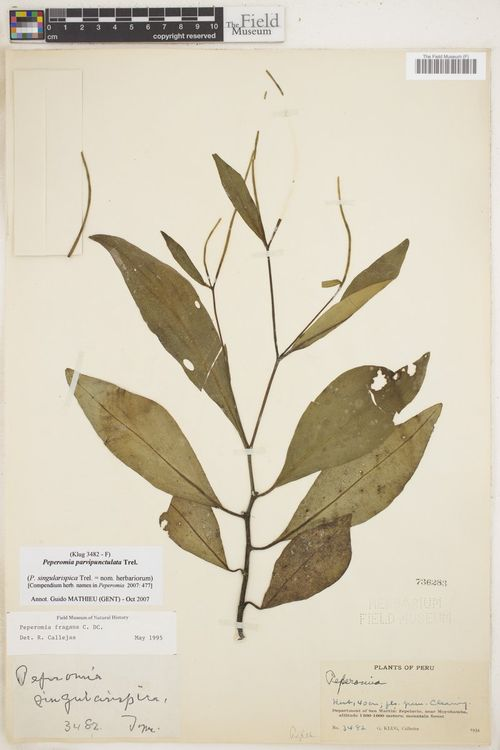

Scientific classification
- Kingdom: Plantae
- Clade: Tracheophytes
- Clade: Angiosperms
- Clade: Magnoliids
- Order: Piperales
- Family: Piperaceae
- Genus: Peperomia
- Species: P. parvipunctulata

Binomial name
- Peperomia parvipunctulata Trel.

= Peperomia parvipunctulata =

Species of plant

Peperomia parvipunctulata is a species of terrestrial or epiphytic herb in the genus Peperomia that is native to Peru. It grows on wet tropical biomes. Its conservation status is Threatened.

== Description ==
The type specimen were collected at San Roque, Peru at an altitude of 1350-1500 meters above sea level.

Peperomia parvipunctulata is a moderately small, somewhat shrubby, branching, glabrous herb with a jointed stem 3 mm thick and short internodes. The alternate leaves are oblanceolate, acute at both ends, measuring 5–7 cm long and 2–3 cm wide. They are pinnately nerved from the lower half, minutely granular in texture, and when dry are thin and opaque. The petiole is 5–10 mm long. The spikes are terminal and from the upper axils, 50 mm long and 1 mm thick, borne on a peduncle 5–10 mm long.

== Taxonomy and naming ==
It was described in 1936 by William Trelease in Publications of the Field Museum of Natural History, Botanical Series 13, from specimens collected by Llewelyn Williams.

The epithet combines the Latin parvus and punctulatus (finely dotted), referring to the minute granular or dotted texture of the leaves.

== Distribution and habitat ==
It is native to Peru. It grows as a terrestrial or epiphytic herb. It grows on wet tropical biomes.

== Conservation ==
This species is assessed as Threatened, in a preliminary report.
