= Peperomia villipetiola =

Scientific classification
- Kingdom: Plantae
- Clade: Tracheophytes
- Clade: Angiosperms
- Clade: Magnoliids
- Order: Piperales
- Family: Piperaceae
- Genus: Peperomia
- Species: P. villipetiola

Binomial name
- Peperomia villipetiola C.DC.

Species of plant

Peperomia villipetiola is a species of plant from the genus Peperomia. It was first described by Casimir de Candolle and published in the book "Notulae Systematicae. Herbier du Museum de Paris 3: 43. 1914.". It is endemic to Peru. First specimens were collected by Vidal-Sénège, M. Its etymology came from the words "villi" (Long, soft hairs covering certain parts of a plant) and "petiola".

== Description ==
It is stemless. Leaves long petiolate, limb ovate-rounded base cordate, tip rounded above glabrous below villous, 7-nerved, villous petiole; villous shaft twice as long as the leaves, thin apex, numerous subcondensed spikes, almost spirally pedunculate and supported by glabrous elliptical scales, peduncles and spikes glabrous, bracts pelt round pedicelled in the center, anthers rounded than the adult filaments many shorter, ovary emerging from an oblong base stipitate at the apex drinking into a cylindrical drip stigmatic tip produced, 2 antipostic stigmas globose and puberulous, elliptic berry with left columnar tip produced in a cylindrical carious drinking drop.

Limbs in dry membranous, up to 2.5 cm. long and wide Petioles 2.5 cm. long hair are about 2 mm. long Scab up to spikes 8 cm. long, 0.5 mm. thick Pancakes are about 1.5 cm. long, white flowers alive. Scales 1.5 mm. long Peduncles up to 3 mm. long The spikelets are almost equal, the fur of the plate is 0.5 mm. diameter berry with stem and style 1 mm. long
