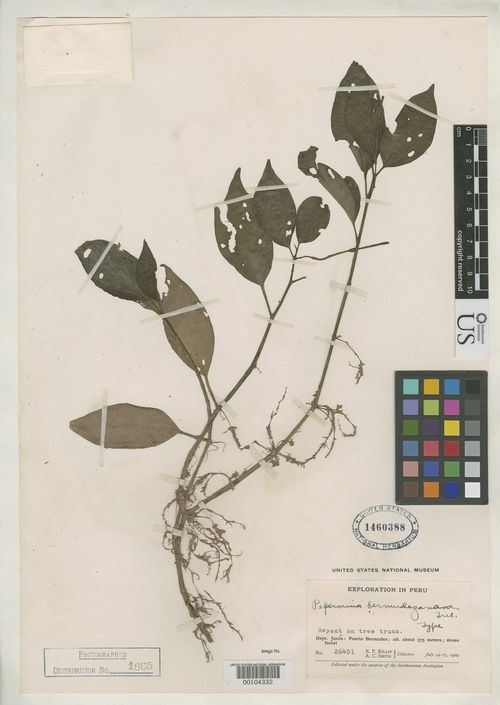

Scientific classification
- Kingdom: Plantae
- Clade: Tracheophytes
- Clade: Angiosperms
- Clade: Magnoliids
- Order: Piperales
- Family: Piperaceae
- Genus: Peperomia
- Species: P. bermudezana

Binomial name
- Peperomia bermudezana Trel.

= Peperomia bermudezana =

Species of flowering plant

Peperomia bermudezana is a species of epiphyte in the genus Peperomia that is endemic to Peru. It grows in wet tropical biomes. Its conservation status is Threatened.

== Description ==
The type specimen was collected near Puerto Bermúdez, Peru, at an altitude of 375 m (1,230 ft).

Peperomia bermudezana is a smooth, creeping and ascending herb that grows on trees. Its stems are 2 to 3 mm thick. The leaves are arranged alternately and are elliptical to somewhat oblong in shape, with a pointed tip and a sharp, acute base. Each leaf blade measures 7 to 9 cm in length and 3 to 4 cm in width. They feature three distinct nerves, or sometimes five obscure ones, with the midrib showing faint branching. When dried, the leaves are thin and dull, with the underside appearing more or less pale. The slender petioles are 1 to 2 cm long. The flower spikes are sympodial, meaning they develop from a series of lateral branches, and are sometimes inserted on short, two-bracted branches. These spikes are thread-like, reaching 70 mm in length, and are borne on a peduncle 5 to 10 mm long. The floral bracts are rounded and peltate, shield-shaped with the stalk attached at the center.

== Taxonomy and naming ==
It was described in 1936 by the American botanist William Trelease in Publications of the Field Museum of Natural History, Botanical Series 13. The species is named after its type locality, Puerto Bermúdez in Peru.

== Distribution and habitat ==
This species is endemic to Peru. It grows as an epiphytic herb in wet tropical biomes.

== Conservation ==
This species is assessed as Threatened, in a preliminary report.
