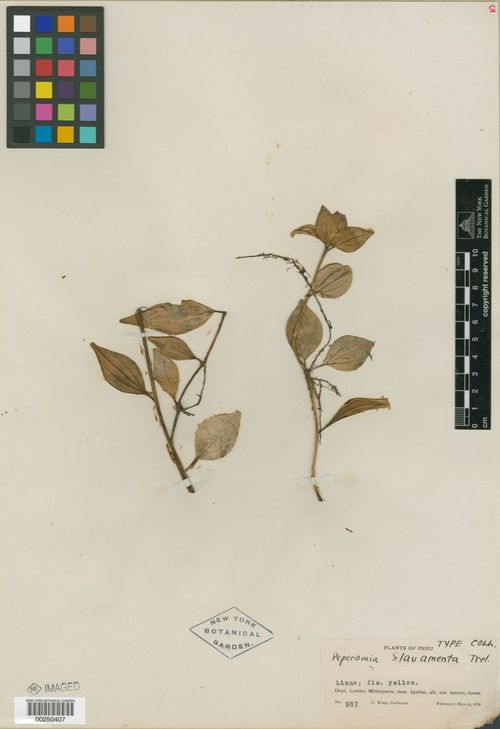

Scientific classification
- Kingdom: Plantae
- Clade: Tracheophytes
- Clade: Angiosperms
- Clade: Magnoliids
- Order: Piperales
- Family: Piperaceae
- Genus: Peperomia
- Species: P. flavamenta

Binomial name
- Peperomia flavamenta Trel.

= Peperomia flavamenta =

Species of flowering plant

Peperomia flavamenta is a species of epiphyte in the genus Peperomia that is endemic in Peru. It grows on wet tropical biomes. Its conservation status is Threatened.

== Description ==
The type specimen were collected near Mischuyacu, Peru, at an altitude of 100 meters (330 ft).

Peperomia flavamenta is a moderately small, creeping and tufted, succulent, nearly glabrous herb. The stem is 1–2 mm thick and grooved when dry. The leaves are in whorls of 2–3. They are lanceolate-ovate, acuminate, with an acute base, measuring 2–5 cm long and 1–2 cm wide. They are 3- or obscurely 5-nerved. The petiole is 3–5 mm long and puberulous. The spikes are yellow, terminal, filiform, 40 mm long, and borne on a 10 mm peduncle.

== Taxonomy and naming ==
It was described in 1936 by William Trelease in Publications of the Field Museum of Natural History, Botanical Series 13, from specimens collected by Guillermo Klug. It got its epithet from the Latin flavus, referring to the distinctive yellow color of the flower spikes.

== Distribution and habitat ==
It is endemic in Peru. It grows on a epiphyte environment and is a herb. It grows on wet tropical biomes.

== Conservation ==
This species is assessed as Threatened, in a preliminary report.
