= Peperomia coquimbensis =

Scientific classification
- Kingdom: Plantae
- Clade: Tracheophytes
- Clade: Angiosperms
- Clade: Magnoliids
- Order: Piperales
- Family: Piperaceae
- Genus: Peperomia
- Species: P. coquimbensis

Binomial name
- Peperomia coquimbensis Skottsb.

Species of plant

Peperomia coquimbensis is a species of epiphytic plant in the family Piperaceae. This species is endemic to Northern Chile where it is found in the Coquimbo Region, particularly in the Bosque de Fray Jorge National Park.
