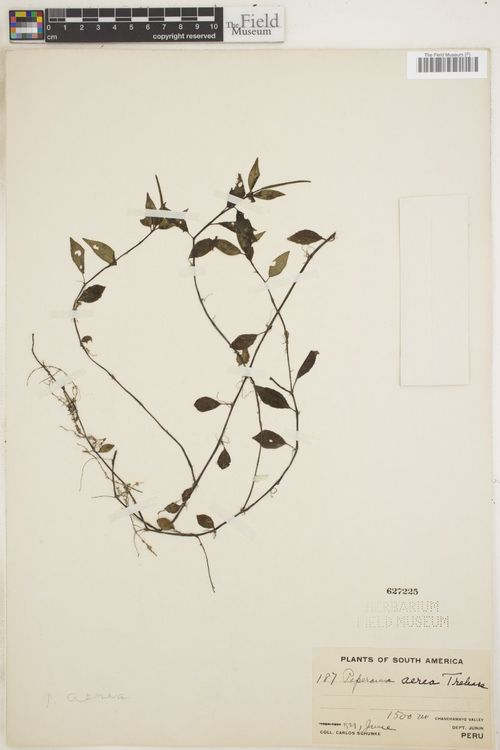

Scientific classification
- Kingdom: Plantae
- Clade: Tracheophytes
- Clade: Angiosperms
- Clade: Magnoliids
- Order: Piperales
- Family: Piperaceae
- Genus: Peperomia
- Species: P. aerea

Binomial name
- Peperomia aerea Trel.

= Peperomia aerea =

Species of flowering plant

Peperomia aerea is a species of epiphyte in the genus Peperomia that is endemic in Peru. It grows on wet tropical biomes. Its conservation status is Threatened.

== Description ==
The type specimen were collected near Chanchamayo Valley, Peru at an altitude of 1,800 meters (5,900 ft).

Peperomia aerea is a delicate, creeping herb with a rhizomatous root system. Its slender stems are about 1 mm thick, with short, ascending branches. The leaves are alternate, lance-shaped, and somewhat pointed, measuring 12–30 mm (0.47–1.18 in) long and 6–12 mm (0.24–0.47 in) wide. These coriaceous (leathery) leaves have a dull, opaque appearance and are narrowly rolled back at the edges. They feature three distinct nerves, or sometimes five obscure ones, and are granular with a color similar to the stem on their underside. The petioles are short, only about 3 mm long. The flowering spikes are terminal and reach up to 50 mm (2 in) in length with a thickness of 1 mm, densely packed with small flowers that may form slight bands. These spikes are borne on a peduncle about 10 mm long. The floral bracts are rounded and peltate, meaning they are shield-shaped with the stalk attached to the center.

== Taxonomy and naming ==
It was described in 1936 by William Trelease in Publications of the Field Museum of Natural History, Botanical Series 13, from specimens collected by Carlos Schunke. It got its name from description of the species.

== Distribution and habitat ==
It is endemic in Peru. It grows on a epiphyte environment and is a herb. It grows on wet tropical biomes.

== Conservation ==
This species is assessed as Threatened, in a preliminary report.
