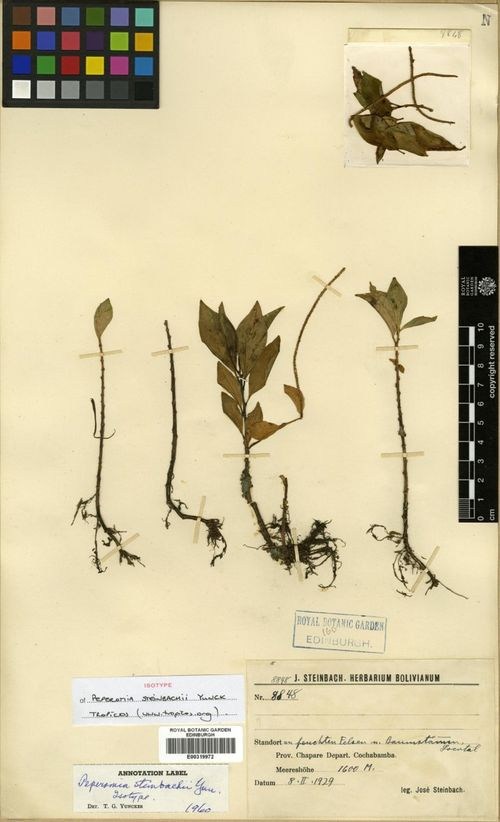

Scientific classification
- Kingdom: Plantae
- Clade: Embryophytes
- Clade: Tracheophytes
- Clade: Spermatophytes
- Clade: Angiosperms
- Clade: Magnoliids
- Order: Piperales
- Family: Piperaceae
- Genus: Peperomia
- Species: P. steinbachii

Binomial name
- Peperomia steinbachii Yunck.

= Peperomia steinbachii =

Species of flowering plant

Peperomia steinbachii is a species of epiphyte in the genus Peperomia that is endemic in Bolivia. Its conservation status is Threatened.

== Description ==
The first specimens where collected in Cochabamba, Bolivia.

Peperomia steinbachiiis a small, smooth herb grows up to 15 cm tall from a creeping, rooting base. Its alternate, elliptic leaves that are 1.5–2 cm wide and 2.5–4.5 cm long have pointed tips and wedge-shaped bases, with 4–5 lateral veins on each side. The leaves are slightly rough at the tips and dry to a firm, somewhat opaque texture. The petioles are about 5 mm long, grooved on top, and clasp the stem while running down it to form ridges. The flower spikes appear at the stem tips and in the leaf axils of the upper reduced leaves, measuring about 1 mm thick and 5–6 cm long. The fruits are small (about 0.8 mm), round to egg-shaped with a sharp, oblique tip and a stigma just below the apex.

It stands out for its completely glabrous surface, alternate leaves with pinnate venation, clasping-decurrent petioles that create prominent ridges on the stem, and its sharply pointed fruit with an oblique apex.

== Taxonomy and naming ==
It was described in 1955 by Truman G. Yuncker in Lilloa 27, from specimens collected by José Steinbach. It got its name from botanist who collected the first specimen, who was José Steinbach.

== Distribution and habitat ==
It is endemic in Bolivia. It grows on a epiphyte environment and is a herb.

== Conservation ==
This species is assessed as Threatened, in a preliminary report.
