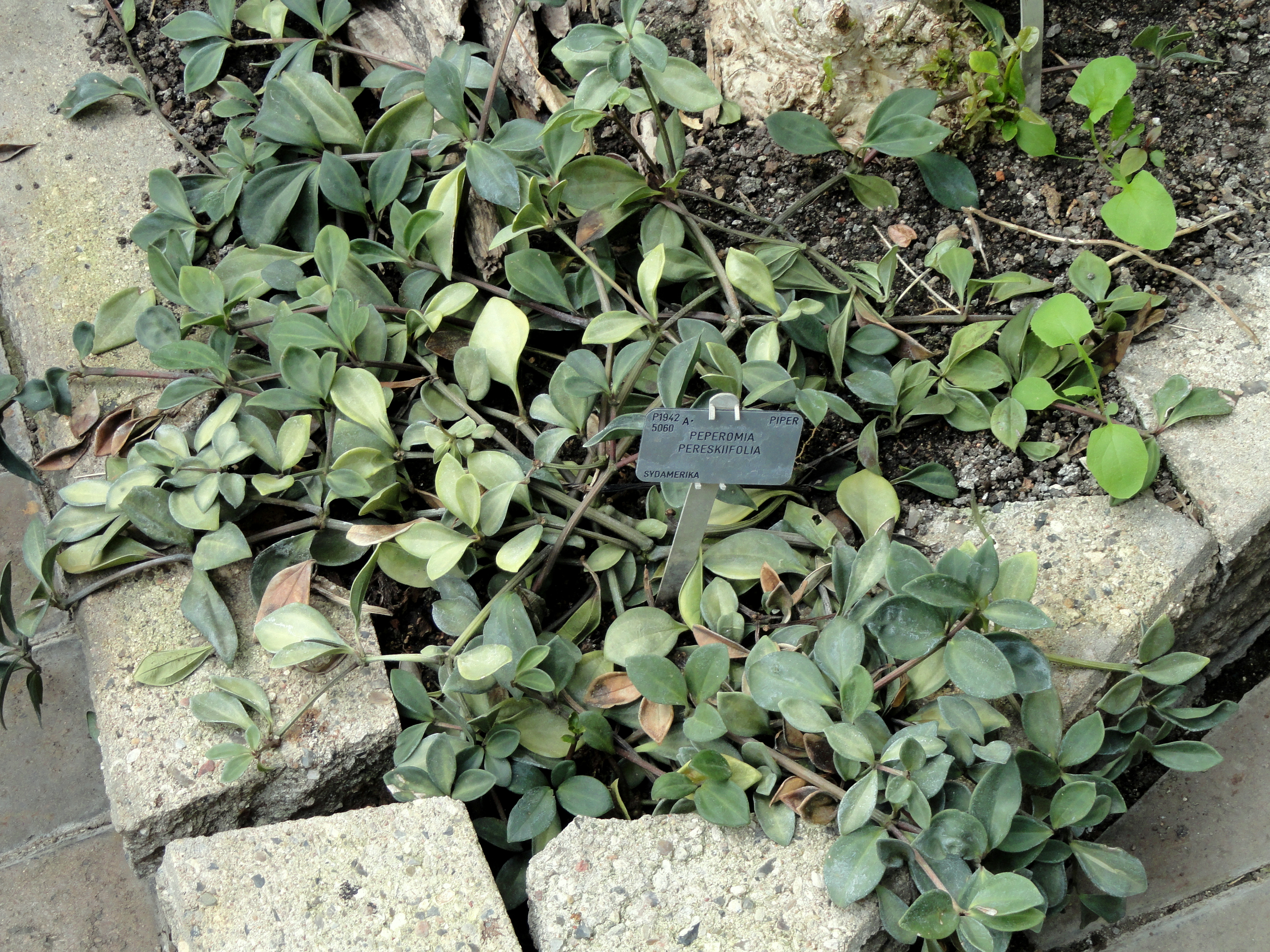

Scientific classification
- Kingdom: Plantae
- Clade: Tracheophytes
- Clade: Angiosperms
- Clade: Magnoliids
- Order: Piperales
- Family: Piperaceae
- Genus: Peperomia
- Species: P. pereskiifolia

Binomial name
- Peperomia pereskiifolia (Jacq.) Kunth

Synonyms
- List: Piper pereskiifolium Jacq.; Troxirum pereskia Raf.

= Peperomia pereskiifolia =

Species of plant

Peperomia pereskiifolia is a species of plant in the genus Peperomia of the family Piperaceae. It is native to Venezuela.
