= Peperomia stevensii =

Scientific classification
- Kingdom: Plantae
- Clade: Tracheophytes
- Clade: Angiosperms
- Clade: Magnoliids
- Order: Piperales
- Family: Piperaceae
- Genus: Peperomia
- Species: P. stevensii

Binomial name
- Peperomia stevensii Trel.

Species of epiphyte

Peperomia stevensii is a species of epiphyte in the genus Peperomia that is endemic in Panama. It grows on wet tropical biomes. Its conservation status is Threatened.

== Description ==
The type specimen was collected in Frijoles, Costa Rica.

Peperomia stevensii is a small, densely velvety, ascending herb that grows in tree tops. The stem is short with short internodes. The leaves are alternate, clustered at the end of the stem, and shaped elliptic or elliptic-ovate with a somewhat pointed to acuminate tip and a small heart-shaped base. They are rather small at 2.5 to 3 by 4 to 6 centimeters, paler beneath, drying green, with submultiple nerves arising from below the upper third. The branches of the midrib number about 5 pairs by 2. The petiole is 1.5 to 3 centimeters long. The spikes are terminal, moderately large at 2 by 60 to 70 millimeters, with densely clustered flowers. The peduncle is 10 to 15 millimeters long. The floral bracts are round and shield-shaped (peltate), drying thin and light yellow. The berries are globe-shaped with an oblique, somewhat truncated tip. The stigma is positioned at the front.

== Taxonomy and naming ==
It was described in 1929 by William Trelease in Contributions from the United States National Herbarium 6. The epithet stevensii honors the collector F.L. Stevens.

== Distribution and habitat ==
It is endemic in Panama. It grows as an epiphyte and is a herb. It grows on wet tropical biomes.

== Conservation ==
This species is assessed as Threatened.
