= Peperomia woytkowskii =

Scientific classification
- Kingdom: Plantae
- Clade: Tracheophytes
- Clade: Angiosperms
- Clade: Magnoliids
- Order: Piperales
- Family: Piperaceae
- Genus: Peperomia
- Species: P. woytkowskii

Binomial name
- Peperomia woytkowskii Yunck.

Species of plant

Peperomia woytkowskii is a plant endemic in the country of Peru. Its specimens were found on July 2, 1961, Department Junin. It has stems that are 5 millimeters thick downward when dry. The hairs can be up to 0.5 millimeters long.
