= Peperomia yananoensis =

Scientific classification
- Kingdom: Plantae
- Clade: Embryophytes
- Clade: Tracheophytes
- Clade: Spermatophytes
- Clade: Angiosperms
- Clade: Magnoliids
- Order: Piperales
- Family: Piperaceae
- Genus: Peperomia
- Species: P. yananoensis

Binomial name
- Peperomia yananoensis Trel.

Species of plant

Peperomia yananoensis is a species of plant from the genus Peperomia. It was discovered by William Trelease in Peru, 1926. It has an elevation of 1800 meters.
