= Peperomia unifoliata =

Scientific classification
- Kingdom: Plantae
- Clade: Tracheophytes
- Clade: Angiosperms
- Clade: Magnoliids
- Order: Piperales
- Family: Piperaceae
- Genus: Peperomia
- Species: P. unifoliata

Binomial name
- Peperomia unifoliata Callejas

Species of flowering plant

Peperomia unifoliata is a species of epiphyte or lithophyte from the genus Peperomia. It was first described by Ricardo Callejas and published in the book "Revista Mexicana de Biodiversidad 82(2): 378–380, f. 15A–E. 2011.". It primarily grows on wet tropical biomes. It is endemic to Costa Rica.
