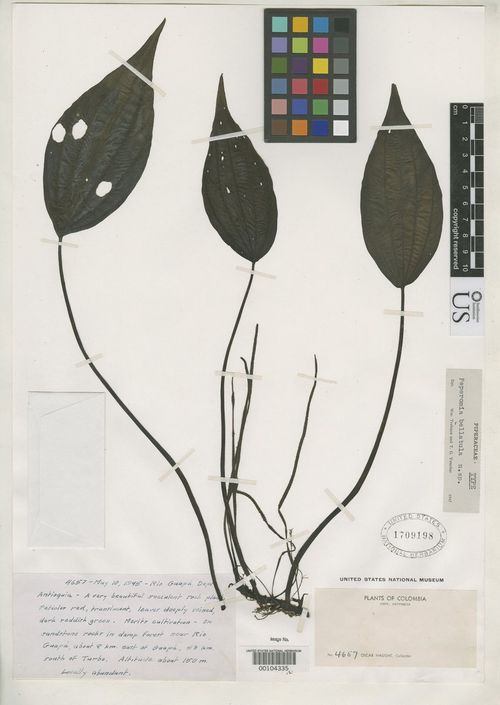

Scientific classification
- Kingdom: Plantae
- Clade: Tracheophytes
- Clade: Angiosperms
- Clade: Magnoliids
- Order: Piperales
- Family: Piperaceae
- Genus: Peperomia
- Species: P. bellatula

Binomial name
- Peperomia bellatula Yunck.

= Peperomia bellatula =

Species of flowering plant

Peperomia bellatula is a species of epiphyte in the genus Peperomia that is endemic in Colombia. It grows on wet tropical biomes. Its conservation status is Threatened.

== Description ==
The first specimens where collected in Antioquia, Colombia.

Peperomia bellatula is a rather large, creeping, rock-dwelling succulent herb with a repent stem 4–5 mm thick and short internodes, smooth and hairless throughout. The alternate leaves are lance-elliptic, measuring 4.5–6 cm wide by 12–15 cm long, with a long-tapering acuminate apex and base that is narrowly obtuse or slightly cordate. They dry dark and somewhat opaque, smooth on both sides or sparsely covered with crisped fine hairs at the base above, palmately 7-nerved with the outermost pair slender and indistinct. The petiole is remarkably long, up to 25 cm (9.8 in), densely fringed with fine hairs above. The spikes are 10–12 cm (3.9–4.7 in) long, terminal on what appears to be short, lateral, bracteate branches; the bracts are about 1 cm long, lanceolate, overlapping and enclosing the base of the peduncle, with moderate flowering. The peduncle is slender, 5–6 cm long, and hairless. The floral bracts are round-peltate, the ovary is top-shaped, and the stigma is divided and positioned apically. Fruit was not matured at the time of description.

The repent stem with long-petiolate, elliptic leaves, characterize this species.

== Taxonomy and naming ==
It was described in 1950 by Truman G. Yuncker in The Piperaceae of northern South America 2, from specimens collected by Oscar Lee Haught. It got its name from description of the species.

== Distribution and habitat ==
It is endemic in Colombia. It grows on a epiphyte environment and is a herb. In Colombia, its elevation range is 150 meters. It grows on wet tropical biomes.

== Conservation ==
This species is assessed as Threatened, in a preliminary report.
