= Peperomia vidaliana =

Scientific classification
- Kingdom: Plantae
- Clade: Tracheophytes
- Clade: Angiosperms
- Clade: Magnoliids
- Order: Piperales
- Family: Piperaceae
- Genus: Peperomia
- Species: P. vidaliana

Binomial name
- Peperomia vidaliana Trel.

Species of epiphyte

Peperomia vidaliana is a species of herb from the genus Peperomia. It was discovered by William Trelease in 1936. Collected specimens date back to 1876 in Paris. Vidaliana came from the surname "Vidal-Sénège". This refers to the species being collected by M. Vidal-Sénège. Peperomia vidaliana is endemic to Peru. Specimens were collected by M. Vidal-Sénège in 1876–1877.

It is a glabrous herb added with pink. It has a slender stem. leaves alternate from oval and lance-shaped, sharp on both sides, it is 5.5 centimeters long and 1-2 centimeters wide. It is 5-nerved. Petioles are 5 millimeters long; Positioned spikes, young 10 millimeters long and 1 millimeter thick, with a short stalk supporting the inflorescence.
