= Peperomia unispicata =

Scientific classification
- Kingdom: Plantae
- Clade: Embryophytes
- Clade: Tracheophytes
- Clade: Angiosperms
- Clade: Magnoliids
- Order: Piperales
- Family: Piperaceae
- Genus: Peperomia
- Species: P. unispicata

Binomial name
- Peperomia unispicata Callejas

Species of epiphyte

Peperomia unispicata is a species of epiphyte from the genus Peperomia. It was first described by Ricardo Callejas and published in the book "Fl. Mesoamer. 2(2): 470.". It primarily grows on wet tropical biomes It is endemic to Panama
