= Peperomia vulcanicola =

Scientific classification
- Kingdom: Plantae
- Clade: Tracheophytes
- Clade: Angiosperms
- Clade: Magnoliids
- Order: Piperales
- Family: Piperaceae
- Genus: Peperomia
- Species: P. vulcanicola

Binomial name
- Peperomia vulcanicola C.DC.

Species of plant in Ecuador

Peperomia vulcanicola is a species of Peperomia plant native to Ecuador. It was discovered by Casimir de Candolle in 1920. It grows in wet tropical biomes.

== Etymology ==
The species epithet vulcanicola is derived from the Latin for inhabiting volcanoes.
