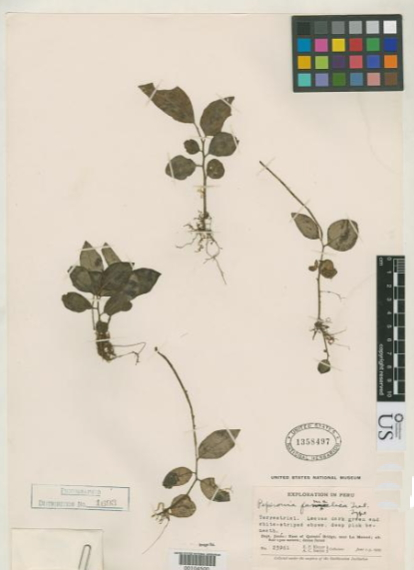

Scientific classification
- Kingdom: Plantae
- Clade: Embryophytes
- Clade: Tracheophytes
- Clade: Angiosperms
- Clade: Magnoliids
- Order: Piperales
- Family: Piperaceae
- Genus: Peperomia
- Species: P. famelica

Binomial name
- Peperomia famelica Trel.

= Peperomia famelica =

Species of flowering plant

Peperomia famelica is a species of flowering plant in the genus Peperomia. It was first described by William Trelease and published in the book "Publications of the Field Museum of Natural History, Botanical Series 13(2): 45. 1936". It primarily grows on wet tropical areas.

== Description ==
It is an impoverished terrestrial herb that is somewhat grassy, with a somewhat curly-pubescent stem and alternating subovate-elliptic and subacute leaves on both sides. 2.5–5 centimetres long, 1.5–2.5 centimetres wide, 5-veined in vivo; round-peltate plates, thin spikes 60 millimetres long laden with small pseudopedicels, white veins, pink beneath; petiole 5 millimetres long.

== Distribution ==
It is endemic to Peru.
