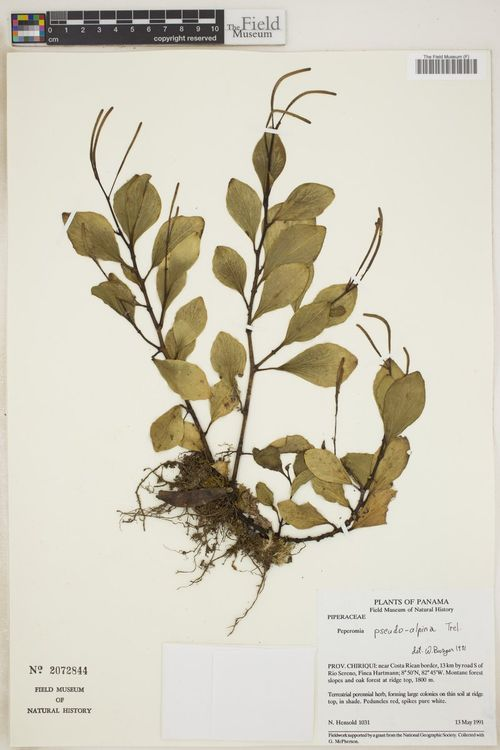

Scientific classification
- Kingdom: Plantae
- Clade: Tracheophytes
- Clade: Angiosperms
- Clade: Magnoliids
- Order: Piperales
- Family: Piperaceae
- Genus: Peperomia
- Species: P. pseudoalpina

Binomial name
- Peperomia pseudoalpina Trel.

Synonyms
- Peperomia palmensis Trel.; Peperomia solisii Trel.; Peperomia tremendalensis Trel.

= Peperomia pseudoalpina =

Species of epiphyte

Peperomia pseudoalpina is a species of epiphyte in the genus Peperomia that is endemic in Costa Rica. It grows on wet tropical biomes. Its conservation status is Threatened.

== Description ==
The type specimen was collected in San Ramón, Costa Rica at an altitude of 1100-1200 meters .

Peperomia pseudoalpina is an essentially hairless, creeping then ascending mountain herb. The stem is rather slender at 2 millimeters thick and roots from the lower nodes. The leaves are alternate, either elliptic or elliptic-obovate, with a slightly notched tip at the somewhat contracted apex and an acute or somewhat wedge-shaped base. They are rather small at 1.5 to 3 by 3 to 4.5 centimeters, sometimes exceeding 4 by 6 centimeters, and dry to a dull, somewhat leathery texture. The leaves are subpinnately nerved from below the middle, with branches of the midrib numbering 2 or 3 pairs by 2. The petiole is about 1 centimeter long. The spikes are terminal, numbering 1 to 3 on a slender, bracted stalk scarcely 2 centimeters long. The spikes are small at scarcely 2 by 30 millimeters, with densely clustered flowers. The peduncle is about 1 centimeter long. The floral bracts are round and shield-shaped (peltate). The berries are ovoid with an oblique beak. The stigma is positioned at the front at the base of the beak.

== Taxonomy and naming ==
It was described in 1929 by William Trelease in Contributions from the United States National Herbarium 6. The epithet pseudoalpina comes from the Greek pseudo- meaning "false" and the Latin alpinus meaning "alpine" or "of high mountains," referring to its resemblance to alpine species despite growing at lower elevations.

== Distribution and habitat ==
It is endemic in Costa Rica. It grows as an epiphyte and is a herb. It grows on wet tropical biomes.

== Conservation ==
This species is assessed as Threatened.
