= Peperomia yanacachiana =

Scientific classification
- Kingdom: Plantae
- Clade: Embryophytes
- Clade: Tracheophytes
- Clade: Angiosperms
- Clade: Magnoliids
- Order: Piperales
- Family: Piperaceae
- Genus: Peperomia
- Species: P. yanacachiana

Binomial name
- Peperomia yanacachiana Yunck.

Species of flowering plant

Peperomia yanacachiana is a species of plant in the family Piperaceae. It was discovered by Truman G. Yuncker in 1955. He discovered the plant in La Paz, Bolivia. It grows at an elevation of 2,100 metres (6,900 ft).
