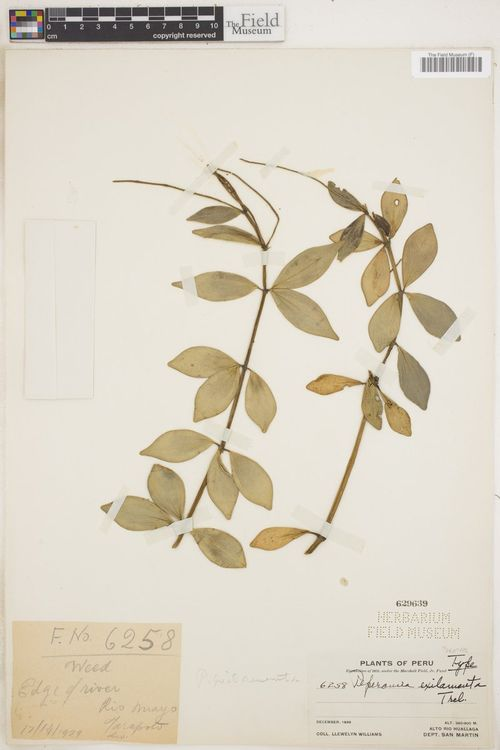

Scientific classification
- Kingdom: Plantae
- Clade: Tracheophytes
- Clade: Angiosperms
- Clade: Magnoliids
- Order: Piperales
- Family: Piperaceae
- Genus: Peperomia
- Species: P. exilamenta

Binomial name
- Peperomia exilamenta Trel.

= Peperomia exilamenta =

Species of flowering plant

Peperomia exilamenta is a species of epiphyte in the genus Peperomia that is endemic in Peru. It grows on wet tropical biomes. Its conservation status is Threatened.

== Description ==
The type specimen were collected near Tarapoto, Peru, at an altitude of 360–900 meters (1,180–2,950 ft).

Peperomia exilamenta is a rather large, epiphytic or terrestrial herb. When dry, the stem is 3–4 mm thick, deeply angled, and very sparsely covered with soft, minute bristles. The leaves are typically in whorls of 3. They are broadly lanceolate to elliptic-lanceolate, bluntly acuminate, with an acute base, measuring 5–6 cm long and 2–2.5 cm wide. They are 3-nerved, with the nerves impressed above and prominent beneath. The leaves are glabrous, with impressed-punctulate dots on the upper surface, a revolute margin, and are very rigid. The petiole is 5 mm long and puberulous. The spikes are terminal and from the upper axils, 120 mm long and 1 mm thick, borne on a peduncle 10–25 mm long. The berries are ovoid, pointed, and bear a pseudocupula, with an apical stigma.

== Taxonomy and naming ==
It was described in 1936 by William Trelease in Publications of the Field Museum of Natural History, Botanical Series 13, from specimens collected by Llewelyn Williams. It got its epithet from the Latin exilis + amentum, referring to the slender spikes or the thin, strap-like leaves.

== Distribution and habitat ==
It is endemic in Peru. It grows on a epiphyte environment and is a herb. It grows on wet tropical biomes.

== Conservation ==
This species is assessed as Threatened, in a preliminary report.
