= Peperomia mitchelioides =

Conservation status
- Critically Endangered (IUCN 3.1)

Scientific classification
- Kingdom: Plantae
- Clade: Tracheophytes
- Clade: Angiosperms
- Clade: Magnoliids
- Order: Piperales
- Family: Piperaceae
- Genus: Peperomia
- Species: P. mitchelioides

Binomial name
- Peperomia mitchelioides Sodiro

Species of flowering plant

Peperomia mitchelioides is a species of plant in the family Piperaceae. It is endemic to Ecuador.
