= Peperomia ventenatii =

Scientific classification
- Kingdom: Plantae
- Clade: Tracheophytes
- Clade: Angiosperms
- Clade: Magnoliids
- Order: Piperales
- Family: Piperaceae
- Genus: Peperomia
- Species: P. ventenatii

Binomial name
- Peperomia ventenatii Miq., 1843

Species of plant

Peperomia ventenatii is a species of epiphyte in the pepper family. It grows in wet tropical biomes. It was first described by Friedrich Miquel in 1843.

== Etymology ==
The specific name ventenatii was given in honor of the French botanist Étienne Pierre Ventenat.

== Subspecies ==
Two subspecies, both described by Miquel, are accepted: P. v. f. pubescens and P. v. var. pubescens.

== Distribution ==
Peperomia ventenatii is native to the Philippines and Java.
