= Peperomia tubericordata =

Scientific classification
- Kingdom: Plantae
- Clade: Tracheophytes
- Clade: Angiosperms
- Clade: Magnoliids
- Order: Piperales
- Family: Piperaceae
- Genus: Peperomia
- Species: P. tubericordata

Binomial name
- Peperomia tubericordata G.Mathieu

Species of flowering plant

Peperomia tubericordata is a species of flowering plant from the genus Peperomia. It was first described by Guido Mathieu and published in the book "Phytotaxa 313(3): 293, f. 1A–B. 2017". It is endemic to Mexico. First specimens where found at an altitude of 1250 meters in Oaxaca, Mexico. It primarily grows on wet tropical biomes.
