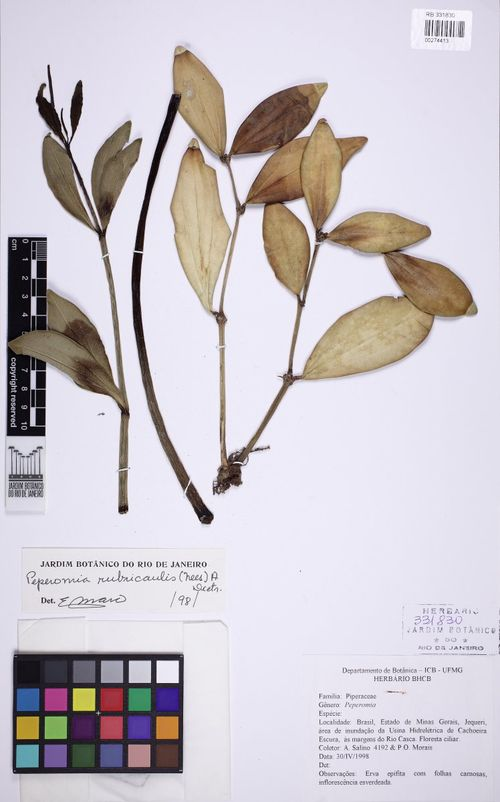

Scientific classification
- Kingdom: Plantae
- Clade: Tracheophytes
- Clade: Angiosperms
- Clade: Magnoliids
- Order: Piperales
- Family: Piperaceae
- Genus: Peperomia
- Species: P. hirtellicaulis

Binomial name
- Peperomia hirtellicaulis Yunck.

= Peperomia hirtellicaulis =

Species of flowering plant

Peperomia hirtellicaulis is a species of epiphyte in the genus Peperomia that is endemic in Colombia. It grows on wet tropical biomes. Its conservation status is Threatened.

== Description ==
The type specimen where collected in Popayán, Colombia.

Peperomia hirtellicaulis is a rather small, stoloniferous-ascending herb with stems 1–2 mm thick, branches ascending up to 8 cm or more from a prostrate, rooting base. The internodes are very short above, 1–3 cm long below, and densely covered with minute fine hairs. The opposite leaves are elliptic, measuring 7–11 mm wide by 15–22 mm long, with apex obtuse or somewhat acute and base acute. They are velvety-fine-hairy on both sides, more densely so beneath, palmately 3-nerved with the lateral nerves rather inconspicuous, drying dark and somewhat opaque. The petiole is 1–5 mm long, fine-hairy, and channelled above. The terminal and axillary spikes are young at the time of description, 1 mm thick by 2 cm long, on short, fine-hairy peduncles. The bracts are round-peltate. The ovary was immature.

The combination of its small stature with densely fine-hairy stems and the short spikes characterize this species. Evidence from the young ovaries suggests they have an oblique apex with subapical stigma. It appears most closely related to P. fendleriana from which it differs in its smaller plants, smaller leaves, and shorter peduncles.

== Taxonomy and naming ==
It was described in 1950 by Truman G. Yuncker in The Piperaceae of northern South America 2, from specimens collected by Kjell von Sneidern. It got its name from description of the species, which literally translates to hairy-stemmed.

== Distribution and habitat ==
It is endemic in Colombia. It grows on a epiphyte environment and is a herb. In Colombia, its elevation range is 1,200–1,700 meters (3,900–5,600 ft). It grows on wet tropical biomes.

== Conservation ==
This species is assessed as Threatened, in a preliminary report.
