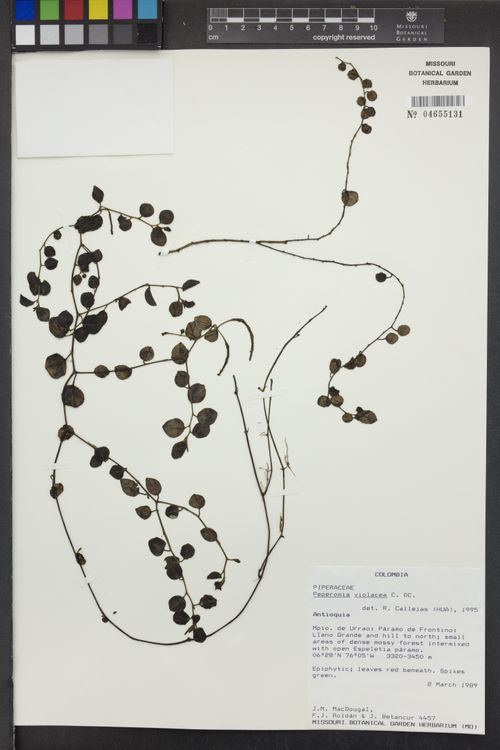

Scientific classification
- Kingdom: Plantae
- Clade: Tracheophytes
- Clade: Angiosperms
- Clade: Magnoliids
- Order: Piperales
- Family: Piperaceae
- Genus: Peperomia
- Species: P. violacea

Binomial name
- Peperomia violacea C.DC.

= Peperomia violacea =

Species of plant

Peperomia violacea is a species of plant from the genus Peperomia. It was first described by Casimir de Candolle and published in the book "Journal de Botanique (Morot) 4(22): 399. 1890. (16 Nov 1890)".

== Distribution ==
It is endemic to Colombia.

- Colombia
  - Antioquia

== Description ==
Leaves shortly petiolate round or superior round-ovate above glabrous beneath densely hairy violet, catkins terminating the branches, ovary obliquely stigmatiferous.
