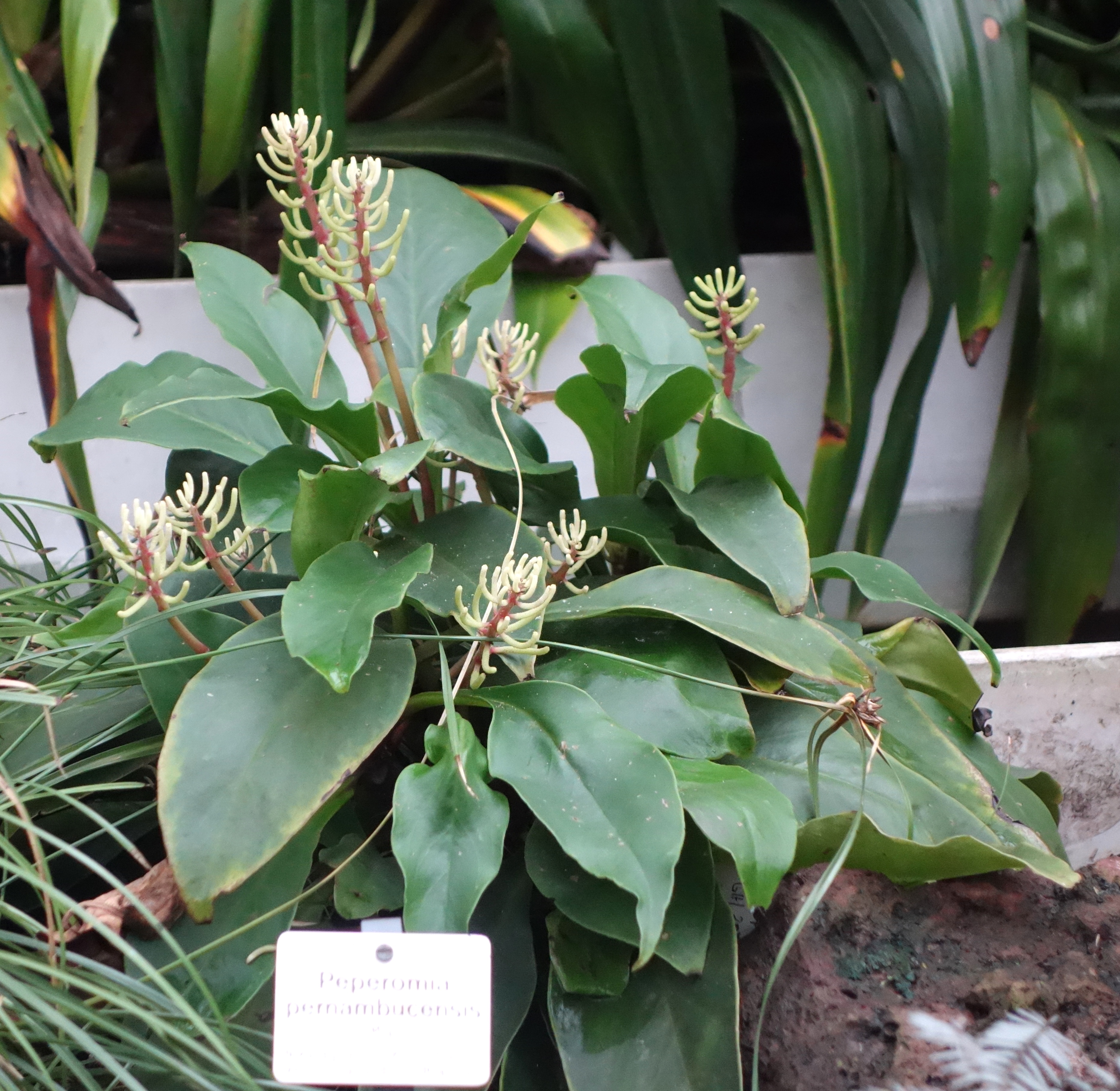

Scientific classification
- Kingdom: Plantae
- Clade: Tracheophytes
- Clade: Angiosperms
- Clade: Magnoliids
- Order: Piperales
- Family: Piperaceae
- Genus: Peperomia
- Species: P. pernambucensis

Binomial name
- Peperomia pernambucensis Miq.

= Peperomia pernambucensis =

Species of flowering plant

Peperomia pernambucensis is a species of plant in the genus Peperomia in the family Piperaceae. Its native range is in Central and South America from Nicaragua to Bolivia.

== Synonyms ==
- Peperomia aphanoneura C. DC.
- Peperomia atirroana Trel.
- Peperomia balsapuertana Trel.
- Peperomia brevicaulis Trel.
- Peperomia breviscapa Trel.
- Peperomia lechleriana Trel.
- Peperomia longifolia C. DC.
- Peperomia lopezensis Trel.
- Peperomia paniculata Regel
- Peperomia subacaulis Trel.
