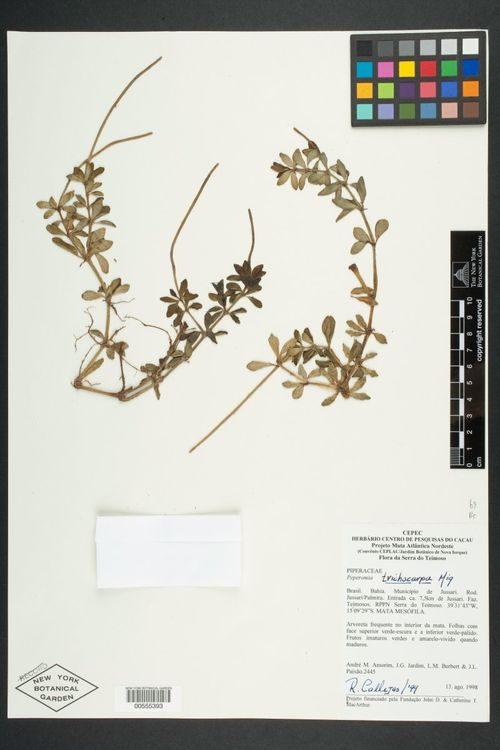

Scientific classification
- Kingdom: Plantae
- Clade: Tracheophytes
- Clade: Angiosperms
- Clade: Magnoliids
- Order: Piperales
- Family: Piperaceae
- Genus: Peperomia
- Species: P. trichocarpa

Binomial name
- Peperomia trichocarpa Miq.

= Peperomia trichocarpa =

Species of flowering plant

Peperomia trichocarpa is a species of epiphyte in the genus Peperomia that is endemic in Brazil. It primarily grows on wet tropical biomes. Its conservation status is Not Threatened.

== Description ==
The first specimens where collected in Brazil.

Peperomia trichocarpa has leaves that are ternate or quadrilateral, shortly petiolate, lanceolate-elliptic with an obtuse apex. Its leaves has a narrow base that has hair growth in both sides, single-nerved, with an etiolate hair growth. Itsflower submerged. Its berry is a hairy ovate-acuminate.

It is a herb, dichotomously branched, decumbent and rooting. The stem and branchlets are reddish. The limbs are 0.01 cm long and 0.003-0.004 cm wide. The petioles 0.0001-0.002 cm long.

== Taxonomy and Naming ==
It was described in 1843 by Friedrich Anton Wilhelm Miquel in Systema Piperacearum, from specimens collected by Jacques Samuel Blanchet. It got its name from the description of its leaves, which means 3-leafed.

== Distribution and Habitat ==
It is endemic in Brazil. It grows on a epiphyte environment and is a herb. It grows on wet tropical biomes.

== Conservation ==
This species is assessed as Not Threatened, in a preliminary report.
