= Peperomia zongolicana =

Scientific classification
- Kingdom: Plantae
- Clade: Tracheophytes
- Clade: Angiosperms
- Clade: Magnoliids
- Order: Piperales
- Family: Piperaceae
- Genus: Peperomia
- Species: P. zongolicana

Binomial name
- Peperomia zongolicana Jimeno-Sevilla & Verg.-Rodr.

Species of perennial herb

Peperomia zongolicana is a species of plant from the genus Peperomia. It was described by Héctor David Jimeno-Sevilla and Daniela Vergara-Rodríguez in 2018, from type material collected in Veracruz, Mexico in 2015 at an elevation of 651 meters.
