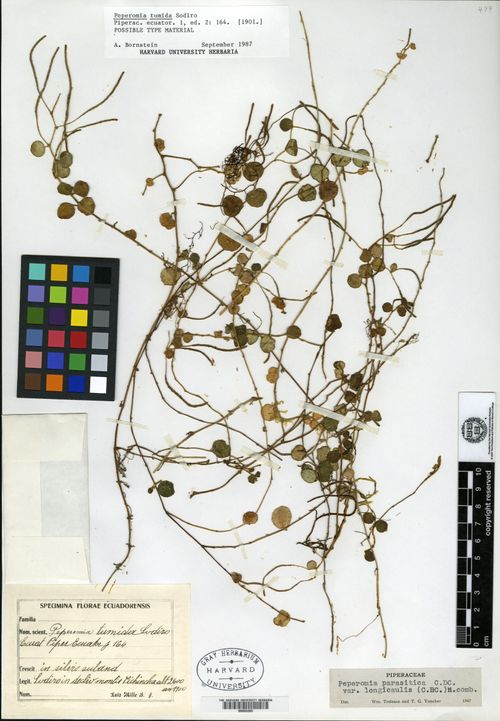

Scientific classification
- Kingdom: Plantae
- Clade: Tracheophytes
- Clade: Angiosperms
- Clade: Magnoliids
- Order: Piperales
- Family: Piperaceae
- Genus: Peperomia
- Species: P. tumida

Binomial name
- Peperomia tumida Sodiro

= Peperomia tumida =

Species of flowering plant

Peperomia tumida is a species of flowering plant from the genus Peperomia. It was first described by Luis Sodiro and published in the book "Contribuciones al conocimiento de la Flora Ecuatoriana . . . Monografia i. Piperaceas Ecuatorianas 1: 164. 1901". It primarily grows on wet tropical biomes. The species name came from Latin word "tumidus", which means swollen. It may be a synonym of Peperomia parasitica. It is endemic to Ecuador. First recorded specimens where found at an altitude of 2600 meters in Pichincha.
