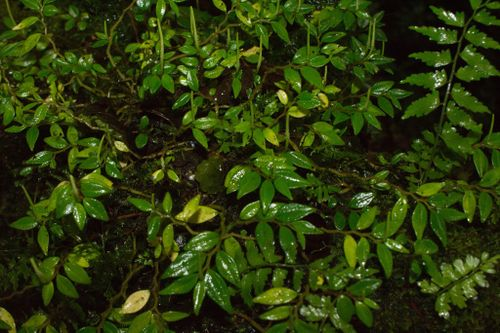

Scientific classification
- Kingdom: Plantae
- Clade: Tracheophytes
- Clade: Angiosperms
- Clade: Magnoliids
- Order: Piperales
- Family: Piperaceae
- Genus: Peperomia
- Species: P. tenelliformis

Binomial name
- Peperomia tenelliformis Trel.

Synonyms
- Peperomia chiriquiensis Yunck.

= Peperomia tenelliformis =

Species of plant in the pepper family

Peperomia tenelliformis is a species of perennial, lithophyte or epiphyte in the family Piperaceae. It was first described by William Trelease and published in the book "Contributions from the United States National Herbarium 26(4): 203. 1929. (31 Dec 1929) ". It primarily grows on wet tropical areas. The species name came from Latin words wikt:tenellus + wikt:forma, which means tender form.

== Description ==
This is a small, stoloniferous epiphytic herb; the stem is slender (1 mm), glabrous, and has short internodes. The leaves are alternate, oblong-subovate, somewhat obtuse at both ends or acutish at base, small (3 to 4x8 to 12 mm), three nerved, rather firm, and somewhat pubescent near the margin; the petiole is 2 to 3 mm long, clasping-decurrent, glabrous, spikes terminal, 1x35 mm, loosely flowered with pseudo-pedicels; the peduncle is scant 10 mm long, glabrous, the bracts are round-peltate.

== Distribution ==
It is endemic to Costa Rica and Panama. First specimens were found at an altitude of 1,600 meters (5,200 ft) in Costa Rica.
