= Peperomia umbrosa =

Scientific classification
- Kingdom: Plantae
- Clade: Embryophytes
- Clade: Tracheophytes
- Clade: Angiosperms
- Clade: Magnoliids
- Order: Piperales
- Family: Piperaceae
- Genus: Peperomia
- Species: P. umbrosa

Binomial name
- Peperomia umbrosa G.Mathieu

Species of epiphyte

Peperomia umbrosa is a species of epiphyte from the genus Peperomia. It was first described by Guido Mathieu and published in the book "Plant Ecology and Evolution 144(2): 172. 2011.". It primarily grows on wet tropical biomes. It is endemic to Peru.
