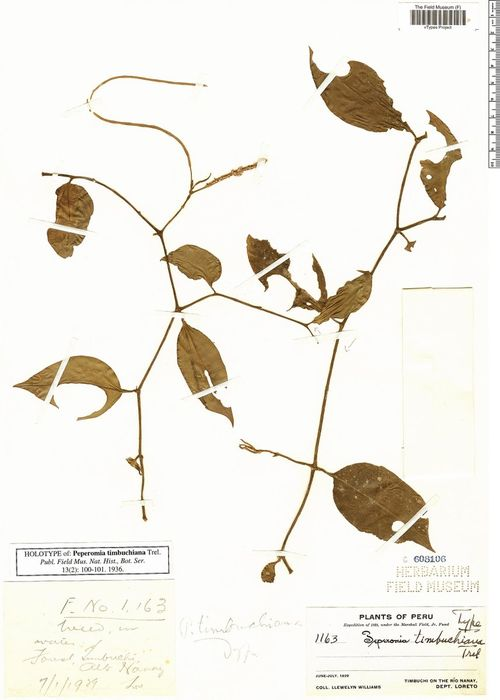

Scientific classification
- Kingdom: Plantae
- Clade: Tracheophytes
- Clade: Angiosperms
- Clade: Magnoliids
- Order: Piperales
- Family: Piperaceae
- Genus: Peperomia
- Species: P. timbuchiana

Binomial name
- Peperomia timbuchiana Trel.

= Peperomia timbuchiana =

Species of flowering plant

Peperomia timbuchiana is a species of herb in the genus Peperomia that is endemic in Peru. Its conservation status is Threatened.

== Description ==
The first specimens where collected in Timbuchi, Peru.

Peperomia timbuchiana is a slender herb spreading with a little branch, the stem minutely disappearing with pubescence. The leaves alternate with an elliptic or sublanceolate acutely pointed at the base which is acute or rounded-acute. It is leathery when dry, brown underneath, darkly pinnate. The spikes are 1-2 terminating short terminal branch 2-bractate that is 100 mm long, with a threadlike peduncle that 10 mm long. The berry is a scutulate oblong that obliquely pointed, with the stigma at the tip.

== Taxonomy and Naming ==
It was described in 1936 by William Trelease in Publications of the Field Museum of Natural History, Botanical Series, from specimens collected by Llewelyn Williams. It got its name from the location where the specimens were first collected, which was Timbuchi, Bolivia.

== Distribution and Habitat ==
It is endemic in Peru. It is a herb.

== Conservation ==
This species is assessed as Threatened, in a preliminary report.
