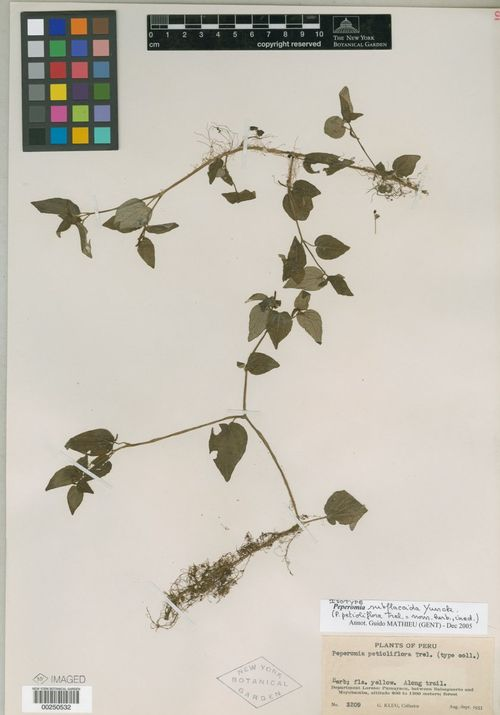

Scientific classification
- Kingdom: Plantae
- Clade: Tracheophytes
- Clade: Angiosperms
- Clade: Magnoliids
- Order: Piperales
- Family: Piperaceae
- Genus: Peperomia
- Species: P. subflaccida

Binomial name
- Peperomia subflaccida Yunck.

= Peperomia subflaccida =

Species of flowering plant

Peperomia subflaccida is a species of epiphyte in the genus Peperomia that is endemic in Peru. It grows on wet tropical biomes. Its conservation status is Threatened.

== Description ==
The first specimens where collected in Loreto, Peru.

Peperomia subflaccida is a small, somewhat floppy, creeping herb that roots from its lower nodes. The stem is smooth and hairless, measuring 1–2 mm in diameter when dry, with branches ascending to about 10 cm; the upper internodes are short, lengthening downward. The alternate leaves are egg-shaped with pointed tips and heart-shaped bases, smooth beneath, with a few soft but thick white hairs above; the margin has distant fine hairs with short stiff tips. Leaves are 1–2 cm wide and 1.5–4 cm long, palmately 7-nerved with nerves branching upward, red-glandular-dotted beneath when young, drying thin, somewhat translucent, dark above and pale beneath. The petiole is 1–1.5 cm long, becoming nearly absent on upper leaves. Terminal spikes are 1 mm in diameter and 1.5 cm long, green when growing, on peduncles about 3 mm long; bracts are rounded and somewhat spoon-shaped, glandular-dotted. Fruit is egg-shaped with a conic tip and apical stigma.

The combination of its delicate, floppy growth form except for scattered soft white hairs on the upper leaf surface sets this species apart. The leaves are distinctly egg-shaped with heart-shaped bases, measuring 1.5–4 cm long, and display seven radiating veins with red glandular dots visible on the underside when young. Most notably, the fruit is egg-shaped with a conic projection at the apex, a feature reflected in the species name. These characteristics distinguish it from P. hispidula, which shares similar leaf hairs but differs markedly in other features.

== Taxonomy and naming ==
It was described in 1957 by Truman G. Yuncker in Svensk Botanisk Tidskrift 51, from specimens collected by Guillermo Klug.

== Distribution and habitat ==
It is endemic in Peru. It grows on a epiphyte environment and is a herb. It grows on wet tropical biomes. The first specimens were collected at and altitude of 600-1200 meters.

== Conservation ==
This species is assessed as Threatened, in a preliminary report.
