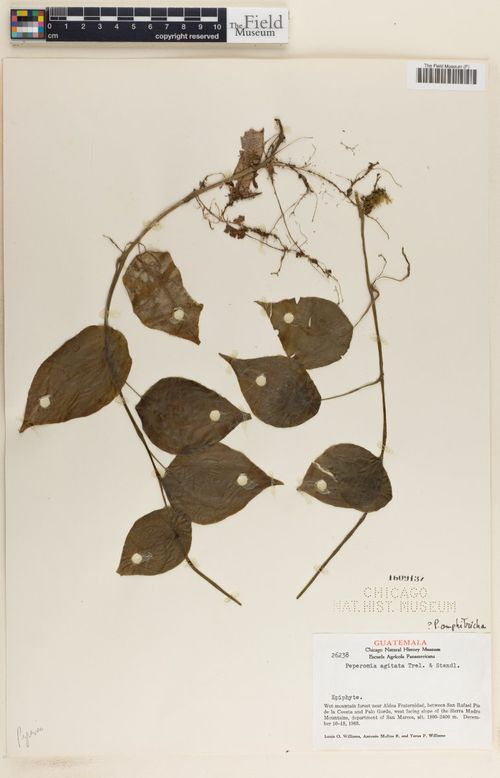

Scientific classification
- Kingdom: Plantae
- Clade: Tracheophytes
- Clade: Angiosperms
- Clade: Magnoliids
- Order: Piperales
- Family: Piperaceae
- Genus: Peperomia
- Species: P. amphitricha

Binomial name
- Peperomia amphitricha Trel.

Synonyms
- Peperomia cerro-puntana Trel.

= Peperomia amphitricha =

Species of epiphyte

Peperomia amphitricha is a species of epiphyte in the genus Peperomia that is endemic in Costa Rica and Panama. It grows on wet tropical biomes. Its conservation status is Threatened.

== Description ==
The type specimen was collected in Quebradillas, Costa Rica at an altitude of 1800 meters.

Peperomia amphitricha is a creeping herb that grows on trees. The stem is slender, only 2 millimeters thick, and is at least temporarily sparsely covered with white, woolly hairs, rooting from many nodes. The leaves are alternate and peltate, meaning the leaf stalk attaches about 1 centimeter above the rounded base, like a shield on a stick. The leaf shape is round-ovate with a pointed, acuminate tip. The leaves are moderate in size, measuring 3.5 to 4 or 5 centimeters wide by 5 to 7 centimeters long. When dried, the leaves are thin but opaque, with an obscure pattern of about 7 veins, and are paler on the underside. Both the upper and lower leaf surfaces have sparse, soft white hairs. The petiole is 2 to 4 centimeters long and also sparsely covered with woolly hairs. The flower spikes are terminal, meaning they grow at the tips of the branches, and are long, reaching 2 millimeters by 100 millimeters or more. The peduncle is elongated, measuring 3 to 4 centimeters long, and is sparsely woolly-haired. The floral bracts are round and shield-shaped (peltate). The berries are nearly globe-shaped, and the stigma is positioned obliquely or at an angle.

== Taxonomy and naming ==
It was described in 1929 by William Trelease in Contributions from the United States National Herbarium 6. The epithet amphitricha comes from the Greek amphi- meaning "both" or "on both sides" and thrix meaning "hair," referring to the sparse white woolly hairs present on both the upper and lower leaf surfaces, as well as on the stem and petiole.

== Subtaxa ==
Following subtaxa are accepted.

- Peperomia amphitricha var. santa-rosana Trel.

== Distribution and habitat ==
It is endemic in Costa Rica and Panama. It grows as an epiphyte and is a herb. It grows on wet tropical biomes.

== Conservation ==
This species is assessed as Threatened.
