= Peperomia hartmannii =

Scientific classification
- Kingdom: Plantae
- Clade: Tracheophytes
- Clade: Angiosperms
- Clade: Magnoliids
- Order: Piperales
- Family: Piperaceae
- Genus: Peperomia
- Species: P. hartmannii

Binomial name
- Peperomia hartmannii C. DC.

Species of epiphyte

Peperomia hartmannii is a species of epiphyte in the genus Peperomia that is native to Colombia. It grows on wet tropical biomes. Its conservation status is Threatened.

== Description ==
The type specimen were cultivated in the Berlin Botanical Garden, originating from Colombia.

Peperomia hartmannii is an erect herb with a cylindrical stem 3 mm thick, velutinous-puberulous. The leaves are alternate with very short velutinous-puberulous petioles 2 mm long; the blade is ovate-oblong, rounded at the base, acutely acuminate at the apex, membranaceous, minutely pellucid-punctulate, green when living, up to 7.5 cm long and 2.2 cm wide, 7-plinerved, velutinous-puberulous on both sides and ciliolate on the margin. The peduncles are terminal and axillary, velutinous-puberulous, 10 mm long, several times longer than the petioles. The spikes are longer than the leaves, nearly 10 cm long and up to 2 mm thick, densely flowered, with a puberulous rachis. The bract has a round pelt, ciliolate on the upper margin, pedicellate at the center, nearly 0.5 mm in diameter. The anthers are rounded, shorter than the filament. The ovary is emergent, obovate, bearing a stigma just below the apex; the stigma is somewhat pilose.

== Taxonomy and naming ==
It was described in 1920 by Casimir de Candolle in the Annuaire du Conservatoire et du Jardin botaniques de Genève, from specimens cultivated in Berlin that were collected in Colombia by Hartmann. It was named in honor of the collector Hartmann.

== Distribution and habitat ==
It is native to Colombia. It grows as a terrestrial or epiphyte and is a herb. It grows on wet tropical biomes.

== Conservation ==
This species is assessed as Threatened, in a preliminary report.
