= Peperomia yatuensis =

Scientific classification
- Kingdom: Plantae
- Clade: Embryophytes
- Clade: Tracheophytes
- Clade: Angiosperms
- Clade: Magnoliids
- Order: Piperales
- Family: Piperaceae
- Genus: Peperomia
- Species: P. yatuensis

Binomial name
- Peperomia yatuensis Steyerm.

Species of plant

Peperomia yatuensis is a species of Amazonian plant from the genus Peperomia. It was described by Julian Alfred Steyermark in 1984, Venezuela.
