= Peperomia yutajensis =

Scientific classification
- Kingdom: Plantae
- Clade: Embryophytes
- Clade: Tracheophytes
- Clade: Angiosperms
- Clade: Magnoliids
- Order: Piperales
- Family: Piperaceae
- Genus: Peperomia
- Species: P. yutajensis

Binomial name
- Peperomia yutajensis Steyerm.

Species of perennial herb

Peperomia yutajensis is a species of plant from the genus 'Peperomia'. It was discovered by Julian Alfred Steyermark in Venezuela in 1984.
