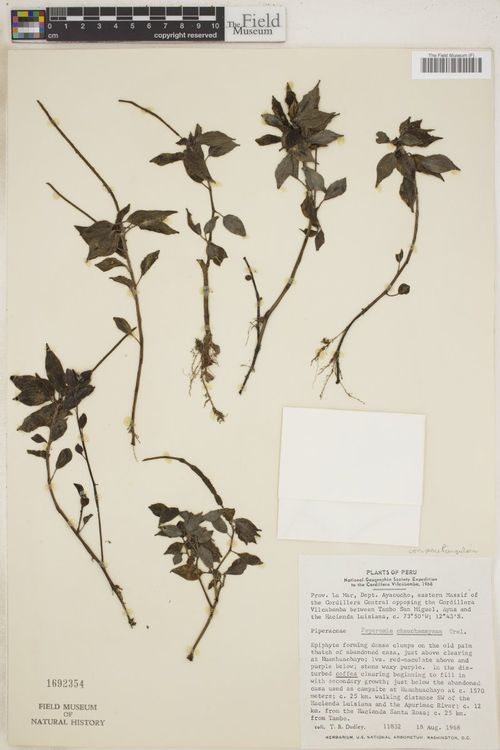

Scientific classification
- Kingdom: Plantae
- Clade: Tracheophytes
- Clade: Angiosperms
- Clade: Magnoliids
- Order: Piperales
- Family: Piperaceae
- Genus: Peperomia
- Species: P. chanchamayana

Binomial name
- Peperomia chanchamayana Trel.

= Peperomia chanchamayana =

Species of flowering plant

Peperomia chanchamayana is a species of epiphyte in the genus Peperomia that is endemic in Peru. It grows on wet tropical biomes. Its conservation status is Threatened.

== Description ==
The type specimen were collected near Chanchamayo Valley, Peru, at an altitude of 1,200 meters (3,900 ft).

Peperomia chanchamayana is a moderately small, epiphytic herb with a rhizome. It is unbranched and completely glabrous, with a stem about 2 mm thick. The alternate leaves are ovate to lanceolate, pointed at both ends, and 2.5–3.5 cm long by 1–1.5 cm wide. They are 3-nerved (or obscurely 5-nerved), paler on the underside, and somewhat leathery with a slightly crisp-revolute margin. The clasping petiole is about 1 cm long. The terminal spikes are 60–90 mm long and 1 mm thick, densely flowered, with very short pseudopedicels, and are borne on a 5 mm peduncle. The berries are subglobose with an oblique apiculus and have a subapical stigma.

== Taxonomy and naming ==
It was described in 1936 by William Trelease in Publications of the Field Museum of Natural History, Botanical Series 13, from specimens collected by Carlos Schunke. It got its name from the location where the type specimen was collected.

== Distribution and habitat ==
It is endemic in Peru. It grows on a epiphyte environment and is a herb. It grows on wet tropical biomes.

== Conservation ==
This species is assessed as Threatened, in a preliminary report.
