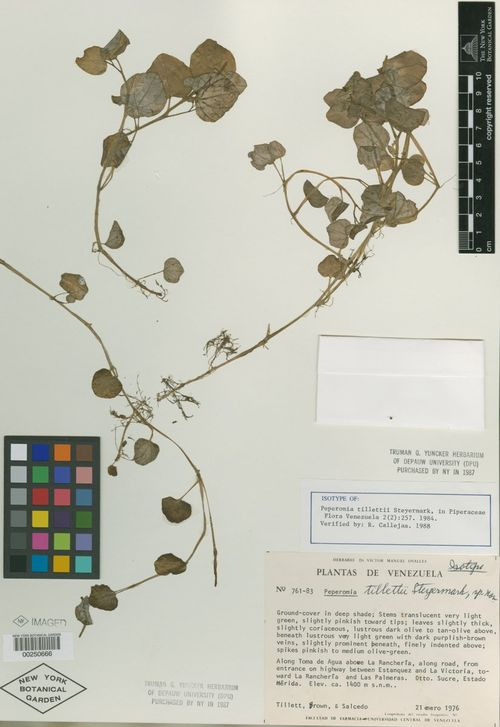

Scientific classification
- Kingdom: Plantae
- Clade: Tracheophytes
- Clade: Angiosperms
- Clade: Magnoliids
- Order: Piperales
- Family: Piperaceae
- Genus: Peperomia
- Species: P. tillettii

Binomial name
- Peperomia tillettii Steyerm.

= Peperomia tillettii =

Species of subshrub

Peperomia tillettii is a species of subshrub in the genus Peperomia that is endemic in Venezuela. It grows on wet tropical biomes. Its conservation status is Threatened.

== Description ==
The type specimen was collected near Mérida, Venezuela at an altitude of 1400 meters.

Peperomia tillettii is a creeping, terrestrial herb that is completely smooth and hairless, rooting at the stem nodes. The stem is 2.2 to 2.5 millimeters thick, with internodes measuring 1.5 to 6 centimeters long. The leaves are alternate, slightly leathery, and when dried become thin, translucent, and dark olive to tawny olive on the upper surface, while the underside is pale green with dark purple-brown veins. The leaf blade is nearly round-ovate or triangular-nearly round, measuring 1.5 to 3 centimeters long and 1.8 to 3 centimeters wide, making it roughly as wide as it is long. The tip is rounded or broadly blunt, and the base is slightly heart-shaped with a small open notch or nearly cut straight across. Each leaf has five palmately radiating veins that branch further. The petiole, is 1.2 to 2 centimeters long and usually shorter than the leaf blade. The inflorescence is simple and positioned opposite the leaves. The peduncle is 2.5 to 3 centimeters long and 0.5 millimeters wide, without bracts. The spike is solitary, measuring 2 to 4.7 centimeters long and 2 millimeters wide, with flowers somewhat spaced apart. The floral bract is nearly round, 0.6 to 0.8 millimeters long, with pale glandular dots. The anthers are 0.25 to 0.3 millimeters long, and the stigma is located at the tip. The fruit is stalkless, dark brown, globe-shaped, finely wrinkled and warty, measuring 1 millimeter wide and 1 millimeter long.

This species differs from P. tenuiflora by having shorter leaf stalks and leaf bases that are more fully heart-shaped with a small notch. It also appears closely related to P. subrenifolia, as both have essentially tip-located stigmas that are more or less terminal and fruits attached at the base. However, Peperomia tillettii fundamentally differs from P. subrenifolia by having an open sinus at the leaf base with the base being flatly and only slightly heart-shaped or cut straight across, as well as having thicker spikes and shorter flower stalks.

== Taxonomy and naming ==
It was described in 1984 by Julian Alfred Steyermark in Flora de Venezuela 2, from the specimen collected by Brown & Salcedo. The epithet tillettii honors Stephen Tillett, a botanist known for his work on the flora of Guyana and Venezuela.

== Distribution and habitat ==
It is endemic in Venezuela. It grows on a subshrub environment and is a herb. It grows on wet tropical biomes.

== Conservation ==
This species is assessed as Threatened.
