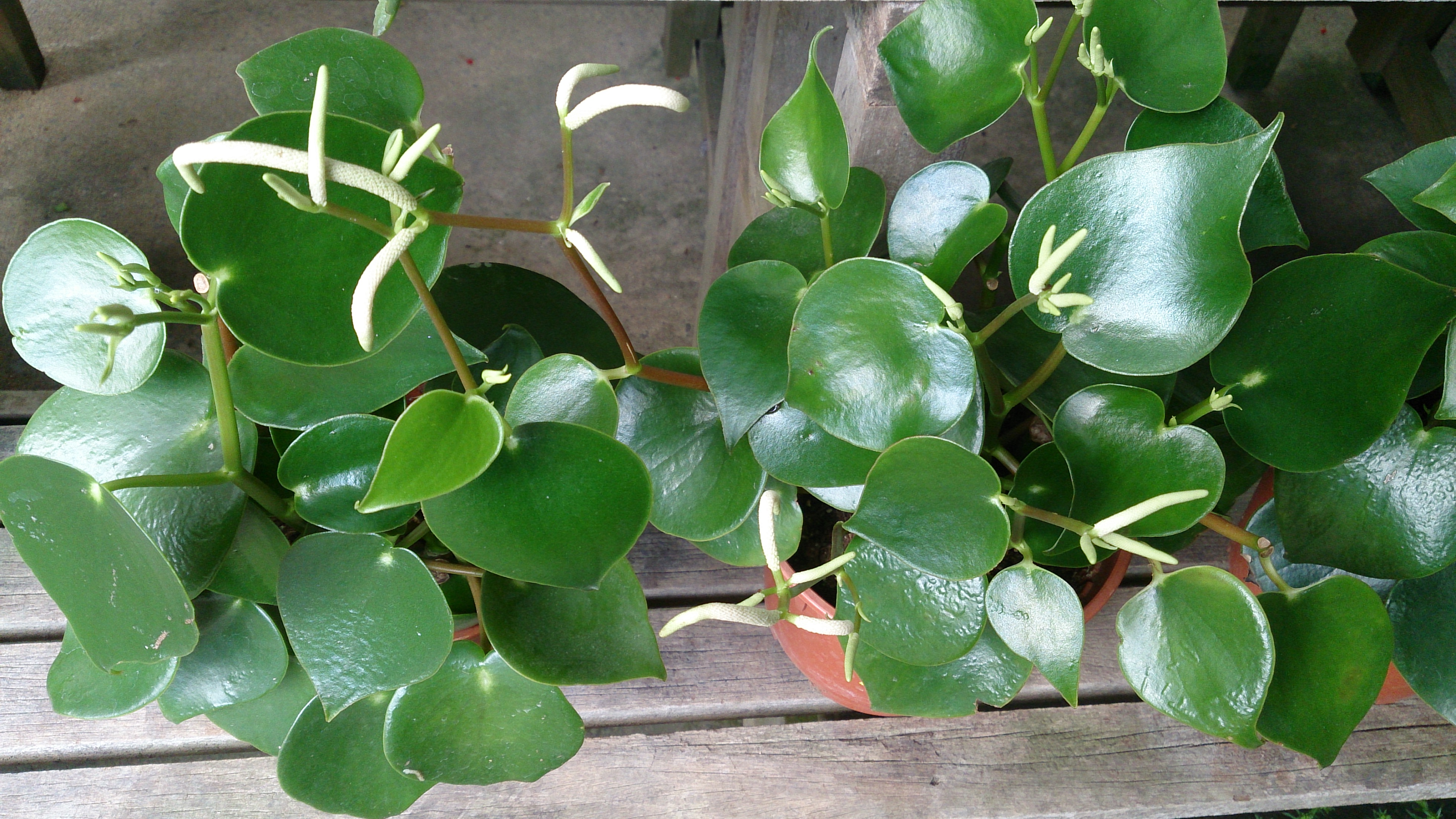

Scientific classification
- Kingdom: Plantae
- Clade: Tracheophytes
- Clade: Angiosperms
- Clade: Magnoliids
- Order: Piperales
- Family: Piperaceae
- Genus: Peperomia
- Species: P. polybotrya

Binomial name
- Peperomia polybotrya Kunth

Synonyms
- Piper polybotrya Poir.

= Peperomia polybotrya =

Species of plant

Peperomia polybotrya, commonly known as raindrop peperomia or raindrop plant, is a species of perennial plant in the genus Peperomia of the family Piperaceae. It is native to Colombia, Ecuador, and Peru.

It grows in a small tree-like form, reaching 30 to 40 cm tall, with petioles forming "branches" ending in large succulent and glossy teardrop-shaped peltate leaves (petiole attached in the center). It is considered easy to grow as a houseplant. The flowers appear as greenish white slender spikes.
