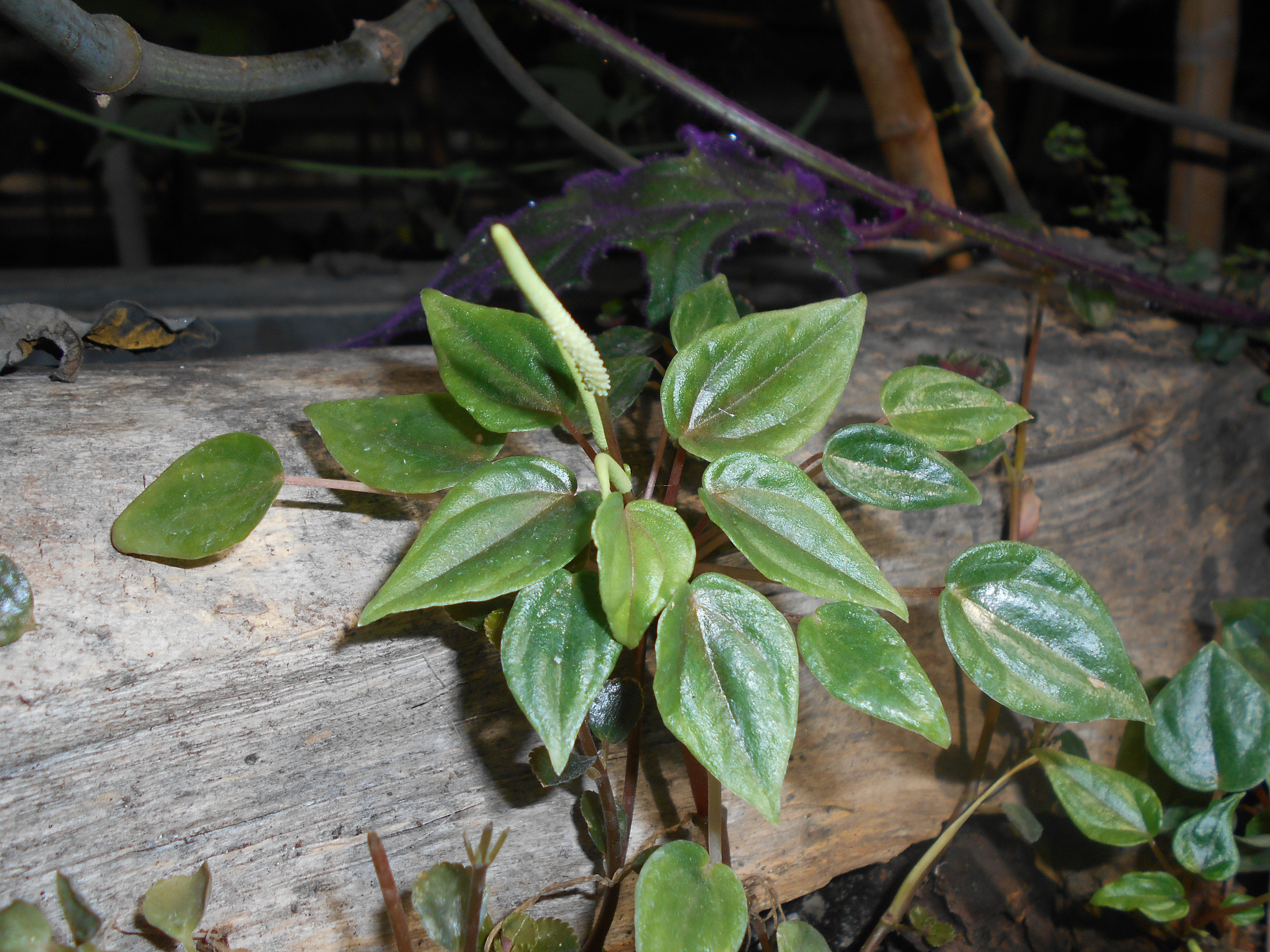

Scientific classification
- Kingdom: Plantae
- Clade: Tracheophytes
- Clade: Angiosperms
- Clade: Magnoliids
- Order: Piperales
- Family: Piperaceae
- Genus: Peperomia
- Species: P. marmorata

Binomial name
- Peperomia marmorata Hook.f.

= Peperomia marmorata =

Species of plant

Peperomia marmorata is a species of plant in the genus Peperomia native to Brazil.
