= Peperomia peruviana =

Scientific classification
- Kingdom: Plantae
- Clade: Tracheophytes
- Clade: Angiosperms
- Clade: Magnoliids
- Order: Piperales
- Family: Piperaceae
- Genus: Peperomia
- Species: P. peruviana

Binomial name
- Peperomia peruviana Dahlst.

Species of plant

Peperomia peruviana is a species of flowering plant in the genus Peperomia. Its native range is in South America from Colombia to northern Argentina.

== Description ==
It is a geophytic plant, storing water and reserves in an underground tuber. During dry periods parts above ground, such as leaves, will wither away but the plant will survive due to the tuber. When more rain falls, the plant regrows its stalks and leaves on the surface.

== Habitat ==
The plant grows at elevations of 2,680–3,700 m (8,790–12,140 ft).
