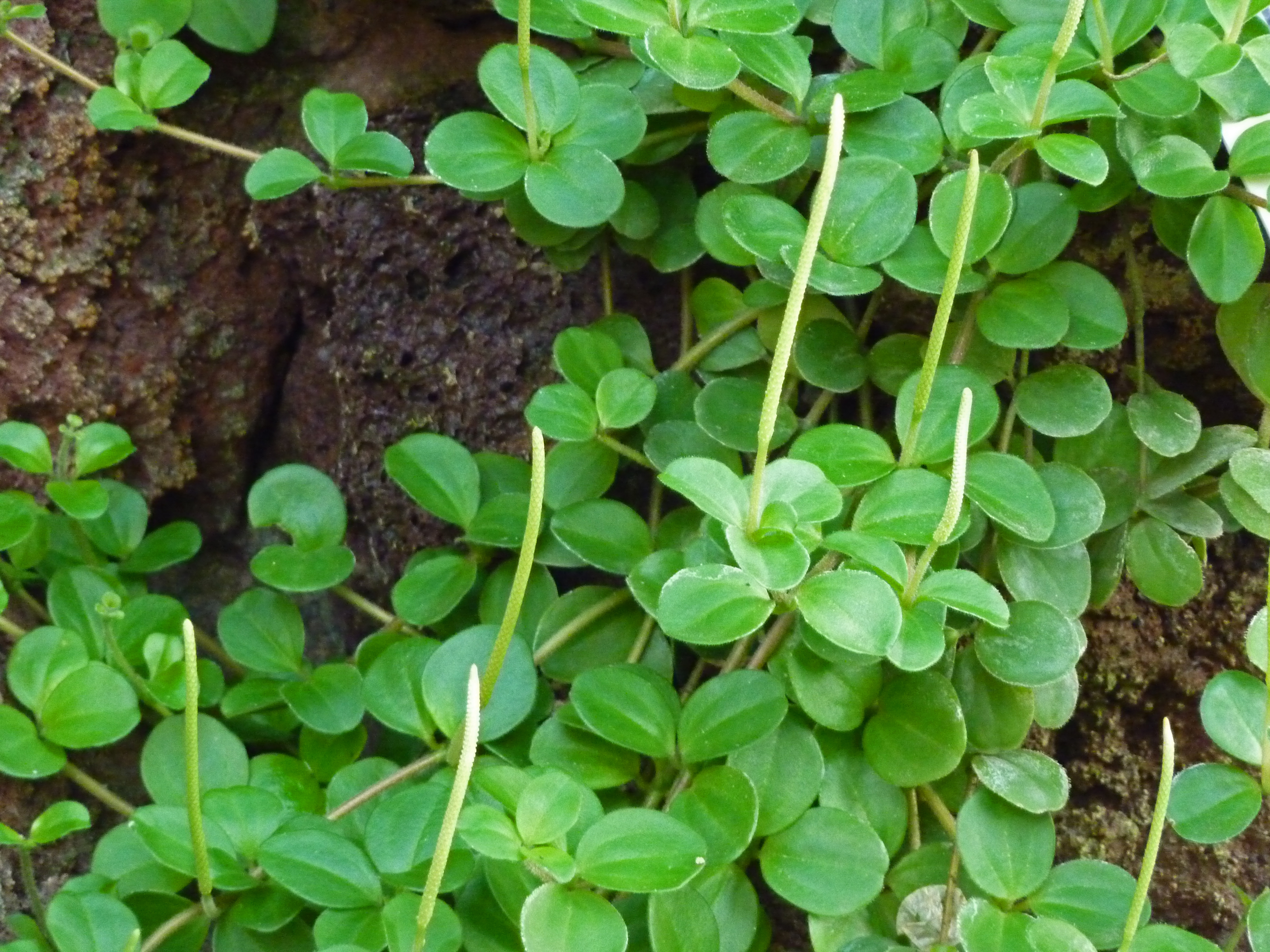
- Peperomia trifolia

Scientific classification
- Kingdom: Plantae
- Clade: Embryophytes
- Clade: Tracheophytes
- Clade: Spermatophytes
- Clade: Angiosperms
- Clade: Magnoliids
- Order: Piperales
- Family: Piperaceae
- Subfamily: Piperoideae
- Genus: Peperomia; Ruiz & Pav.

Species
- Over 1,000 – see List of Peperomia species

Synonyms
- 9 synonyms: Acrocarpidium Miq.; Erasmia Miq.; Micropiper Miq.; Phyllobryon Miq.; Piperanthera C.DC.; Rhynchophorum (Miq.) Small; Tildenia Miq.; Trigonanthera André; Troxirum Raf.

= Peperomia =

Genus of plants

Peperomia is one of the two large genera of the family Piperaceae. It is estimated that there are over 1,000 species, occurring in all tropical and subtropical regions of the world. They are concentrated in South and Central America, but may also be found in southern North America, the Caribbean islands, Africa, Oceania, and southern and eastern parts of Asia. The exact number of species is difficult to determine, as some plants have been recorded several times with different names, and new species continue to be discovered. Peperomias have adapted to many different environments and their appearances vary greatly. Some are epiphytes (growing on other plants) or lithophytes (growing on rock or in rock crevices), and many are xerophytes (drought-tolerant, with thick succulent structures to save water) or possess underground tubers (geophytes). Most species are compact perennial shrubs or vines.

Some Peperomias have thick, waxy, succulent leaves and stems; still, others are rather delicate, with paper-thin leaves. Many species will easily sunburn, preferring filtered or indirect, bright sunlight. Most of the Peperomias have minimal to virtually non-existent root systems (species-depending), with the entire mass often being nothing more than a collection of tiny, hair-like appendages used to anchor the plant. These roots, while delicate, also enable the plants to survive in less-than-ideal conditions; however, their fragility also places them at a greater risk for root rot if water does not drain sufficiently quickly.

The genus name Peperomia was coined by Spanish botanists Ruiz López and Pavón Jiménez in 1794 after their travels in Peru and Chile. Peperomia plants do not have a widely- accepted common name, and some argue that it is better to use the genus name, as is the case with genera such as Petunia and Begonia. They are sometimes called radiator plants, a name possibly coined by L.H. Bailey because many of them enjoy bright and dry environments similar to a windowsill above a radiator. Furthermore, many individuals simply refer to the many Peperomias by their individual nicknames, such as Peperomia polybotrya being called the “Raindrop Peperomia” (due to its large, drop-shaped leaves), or P. argyreia being the “Watermelon Peperomia”, due to its leaf veining and shape resembling the look of a watermelon.

== Description ==
Peperomias vary considerably in appearance (see gallery below) and there is no universally accepted method of categorising them, although three main groups can be distinguished. Most species are compact and usually do not exceed 30 cm (12 in) in height.

First are plants with decorative foliage, which often grow in rain or cloud forests as epiphytes. They are adapted to living in small shady crevices on, for example, trees, with small root systems. As they do not have access to ground water they are typically succulent to a certain degree, which in many species shows as thick, fleshy leaves which have a waxy surface and are sometimes rippled. The leaves may be oval with the leafstalk at or near the center of the leaf blade, or they may be heart-shaped or lance-shaped; their size varies from 2.5–10 cm (1–4 in) long. They may be green or striped, marbled or bordered with pale green, red or gray, and the petioles of some kinds are red. They also enjoy high air humidity, warm temperatures, and grow all year round. Examples include P. argyreia, P. caperata, P. nitida, P. obtusifolia, P. polybotrya, and P. scandens.

The second group consists of more arid-climate, succulent peperomias, which are often found at higher altitudes. They are adapted to withstanding a long warm season followed by a colder winter and very little rainfall. They store water both in their stout stems and in their succulent leaves, which typically form a sort of “tube” or “burrito”, appearing U- or V-shaped in cross-section, often with epidermal windows on the top-side. P. columella, P. ferreyrae, P. graveolens and P. nivalis fall into this category.

The third group contains geophytic peperomias. These plants have leaves that fall off in the colder dry season, survive due to their underground tubers, and grow the leaves back as more rain falls. Examples include P. macrorhiza, P. peruviana, and P. umbilicata. Currently just under 50 species of geophytic peperomias are known, but new ones continue to be discovered.

Peperomia flowers are typically unnoticeable, growing in cordlike spikes, although there are some exceptions, such as P. fraseri. Most peperomia flowers seem odorless to humans but some carry a musty or even unpleasant odor, such as P. graveolens. The fruit is a berry that eventually dries out and shows the tiny pepper-like seed.

== Species ==
There are over a thousand Peperomia species, although the exact number is unclear as some plants have been recorded several times with different names (c. 3,000 names have been used in publications) and new species continue to be discovered. At the moment [when?], Catalogue of Life lists around 1,400 recognized species.

== Distribution ==
Peperomias are found in tropical and sub-tropical regions around the world. Northern South America and Central America host the largest number of species, but peperomias can also be found in Africa, southern Asia, and Oceania. The exact number of peperomia species continues to change as new plants are discovered and some distinct plant names, perhaps catalogued in separate geographical regions, are realised to describe the same species. Therefore, the table below gives only a rough overall impression of the worldwide distribution.

Distribution of peperomia species
Area	Taxa	Examples of endemic species (based on POWO)
Peru	405	P. andina, P. dolabella, P. dolabriformis, P. macrorhiza, P. metallica, P. minuta, P. nivalis, P. rubescens, P. verschaffeltii
Colombia	259	P. abbreviatipes, P. cordata, P. dimota, P. perciliata, P. turboensis
Ecuador	237	P. graveolens, P. albovittata, P. cuspidilimba, P. fagerlindii, P. rugosa
Costa Rica	155	P. barbulata, P. dyscrita, P. hammelii, P. incognita, P. vinasiana
Mexico	139	P. camptotricha, P. hobbitoides, P. oxycarpa, P. tuberosa, P. xalana
Brazil	117	P. caperata, P. flexicaulis, P. griseoargentea, P. marmorata, P. nudifolia, P. ramboi
Caribbean Islands	72	P. clusiifolia, P. cubensis, P. verticillata
Pacific Islands (other than mentioned)	45	P. attenuata, P. mariannensis, P. tutuilana
Madagascar	42	P. ankaranensis, P. humbertii, P. mocquerysii
Hawaii	22	P. cookiana, P. kipahuluensis, P. obovatilimba
Africa (continental)	21	P. fernandopoiana, P. kamerunana, P. vulcanica
Philippines	18	P. copelandii, P. elmeri, P. recurvata
Papuasia	18	P. bismarckiana, P. peckelii, P. schlechteri
India	11	P. ekakesara, P. emarginatifolia, P. thomsonii
Southeast Asia (Indo-China)	7	P. masuthoniana, P. sirindhorniana, P. thorelii
Australia	5	P. bellendenkerensis, P. enervis, P. hunteriana

Note that many peperomias are found in wide overlapping regions, for example everywhere in tropical America or Asia, and so may have not been included in the species count for individual areas.

== Peperomias and humans ==
=== Horticulture ===
Peperomias are often grown for their ornamental foliage and many species are considered easy to grow in homes and greenhouses. Several species have been given the Award of Garden Merit by the Royal Horticultural Society. Peperomias are considered non-toxic and are recommended for households with children or animals.

Out of the 1,000+ Peperomia species, currently [when?] only about 40 of them are commonly used as houseplants. These peperomias fare well in average home conditions and can relatively easily be found in stores and garden centers. Species in this basic group include P. alata, P. albovittata, P. argyreia, P. blanda, P. boivinii, P. caperata, P. clusiifolia, P. columella, P. dolabriformis, P. ferreyrae, P. fraseri, P. glabella, P. graveolens, P. griseoargentea, P. hoffmannii, P. incana, P. japonica, P. kimnachii, P. maculosa, P. metallica, P. nitida (often sold as P. scandens), P. nivalis, P. obtusifolia, P. pellucida, P. perciliata, P. pereskiifolia, P. polybotrya, P. prostrata, P. quadrangularis (syn. P. angulata), P. rotundifolia, P. rugosa, P. tetragona (syn. P. puteolata), P. tetraphylla, P. turboensis, P. urocarpa, P. verschaffeltii, P. verticillata (syn. P. rubella), and P. wheeleri.

There can be, however, several cultivars available from each species. Identifying species can be challenging as plants are often sold under marketing names, older synonyms, or under names that have not been officially accepted. This is the case, for example, with Peperomia orba (often sold as Peperomia 'Pixie'), Peperomia viridis, and Peperomia axillaris. In addition to natural species and their cultivars, some artificial hybrid varieties can also be found on the market, such as Peperomia 'Hope' (a cross between P. deppeana and P. quadrifolia).

Most species need airy, well-draining substrate and want to dry out to some extent or even completely between waterings. A typical reason for losing a peperomia is through root rot caused by over-watering. The tropical, decorative foliage plants, typically enjoy shadier conditions with more humidity. Some might even require a terrarium or a bottle garden to maintain high humidity. The arid climate succulent types should be treated similarly to cacti and other succulents: they can tolerate more light and will survive a dry cold period, during which they are watered only seldomly. The geophytic peperomias are used to experiencing a cold resting period once a year.

=== Food and medicine ===
Many peperomias are herbs in the sense that their leaves carry a spicy flavour and, when crushed, emit a strong odour. Therefore, some species, such as Peperomia pellucida, are used in salads and cooking, or to flavour drinks. But it is advised that people should not try to eat the peperomias sold as houseplants.

Some species, including Peperomia inaequalifolia, Peperomia congona and Peperomia pellucida, are also used in herbal medicine for various health conditions. While such folk medicine usage is common in Peru and elsewhere, the possible medicinal qualities of peperomias remain poorly investigated, although there has been a growing interest for the subject recently.

== Propagation ==
These plants can be propagated by seeds, by cuttings, or by dividing. Peperomia cuttings of many species root easily.

Cuttings should be taken in spring or summer, with the lower leaves removed and a cut made just below a node. The cuttings are left to dry for about an hour to allow a protective callus tissue to form, preventing rot. Once dried, they can be planted in a well-draining substrate such as perlite or peat moss. Semi-succulent species benefit from bottom heat around 21–24°C (70–75°F), but it is important not to seal the top completely, as excessive humidity can be detrimental. Once roots have formed, the cuttings can be transplanted into 75 mm (3 in) pots or hanging baskets.

Peperomia plants can also be propagated by division, especially clumping species. Division involves separating the plant into smaller sections, each with roots attached, and is best done during repotting in the growing season. Seed propagation is less common due to slower germination but can be achieved by sowing seeds in a well-draining, sterile medium while maintaining warm, humid conditions.

Maintaining warm temperatures (18–24°C) and moderate humidity is essential for successful propagation. Overwatering should be avoided, as Peperomias are prone to root rot in poorly draining soils.

== Gallery ==
=== Examples of tropical, decorative foliage types ===
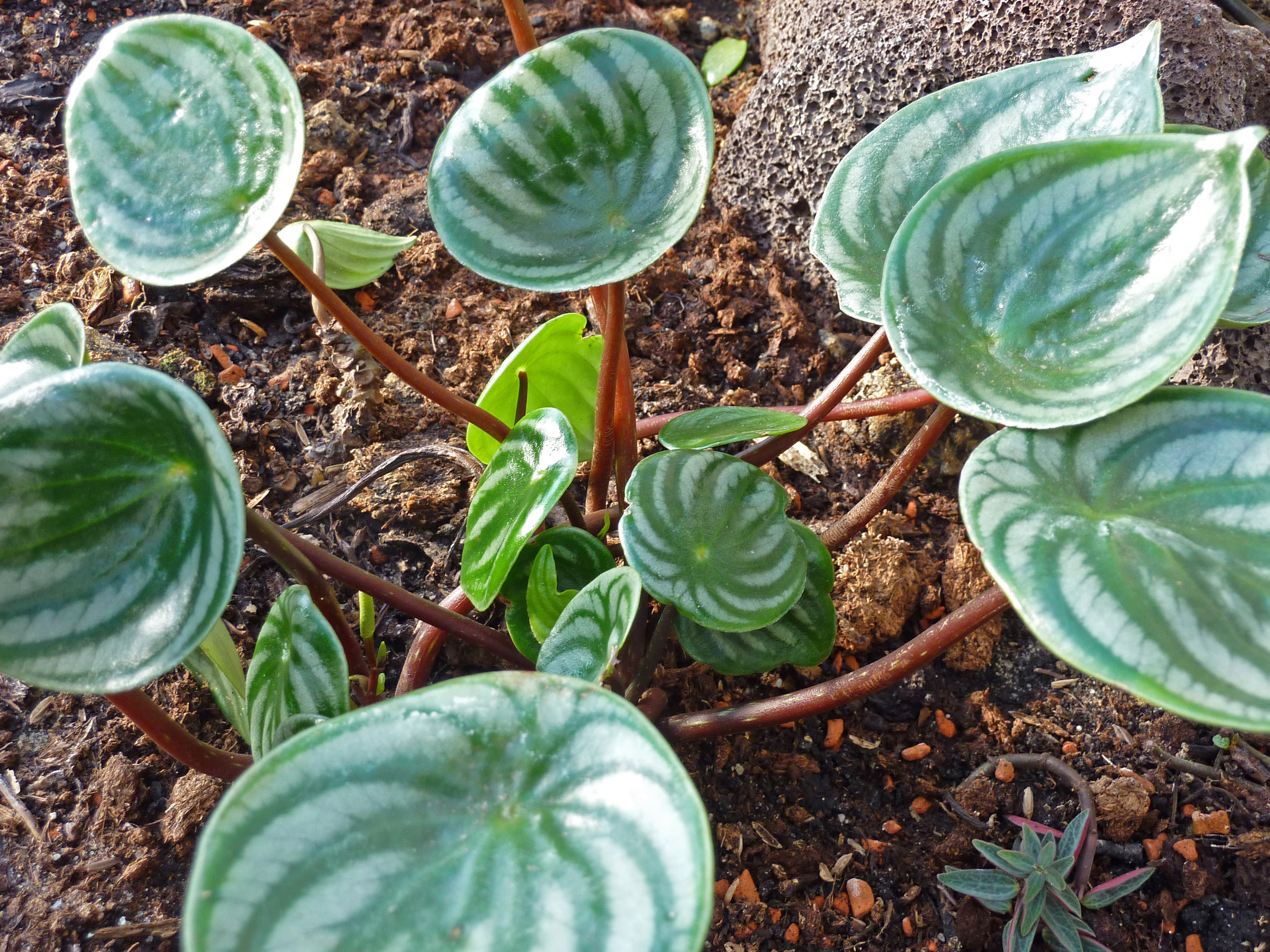
Peperomia argyreia, "watermelon peperomia"

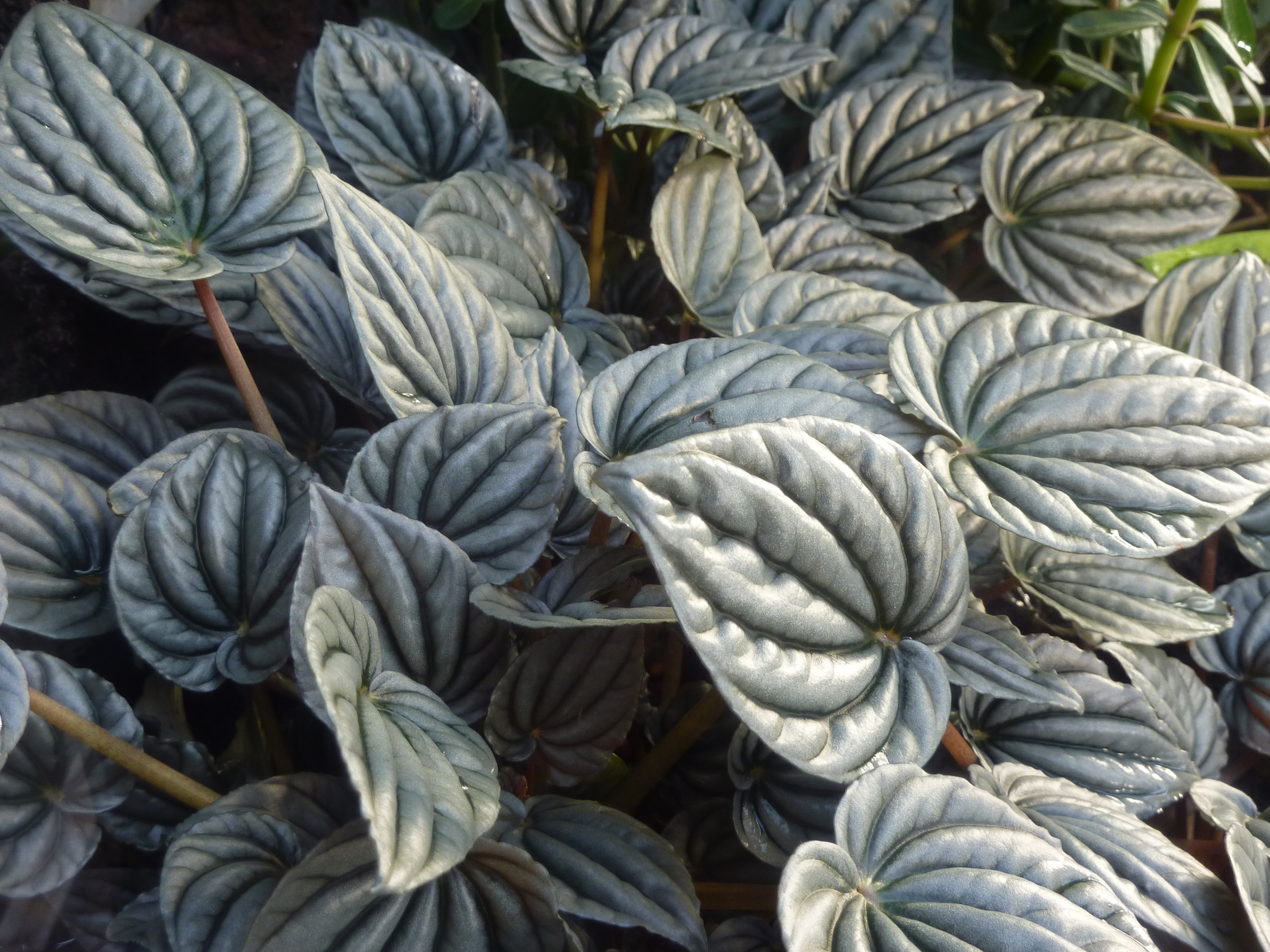
Peperomia griseoargentea

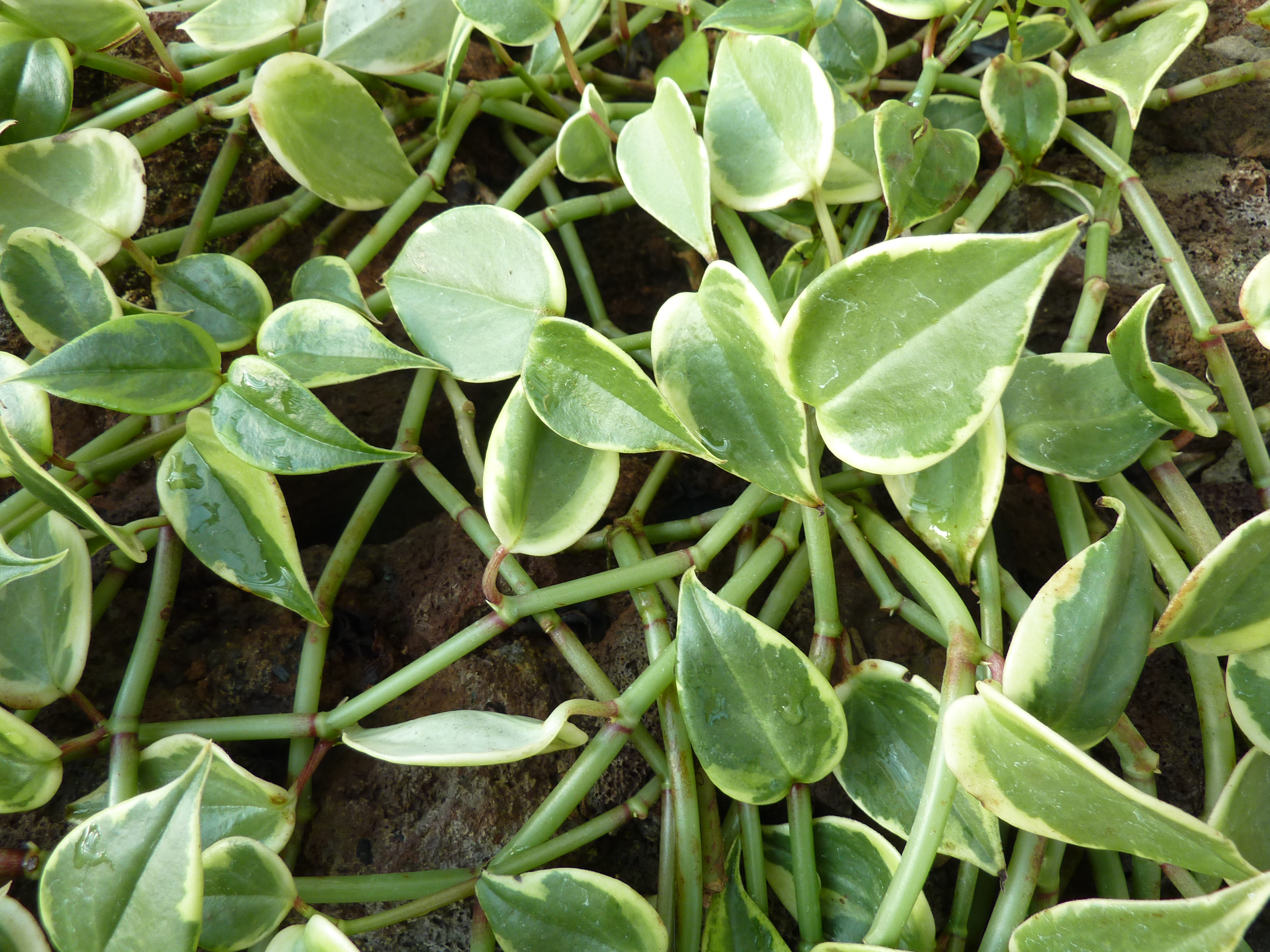
Peperomia nitida "variegata"

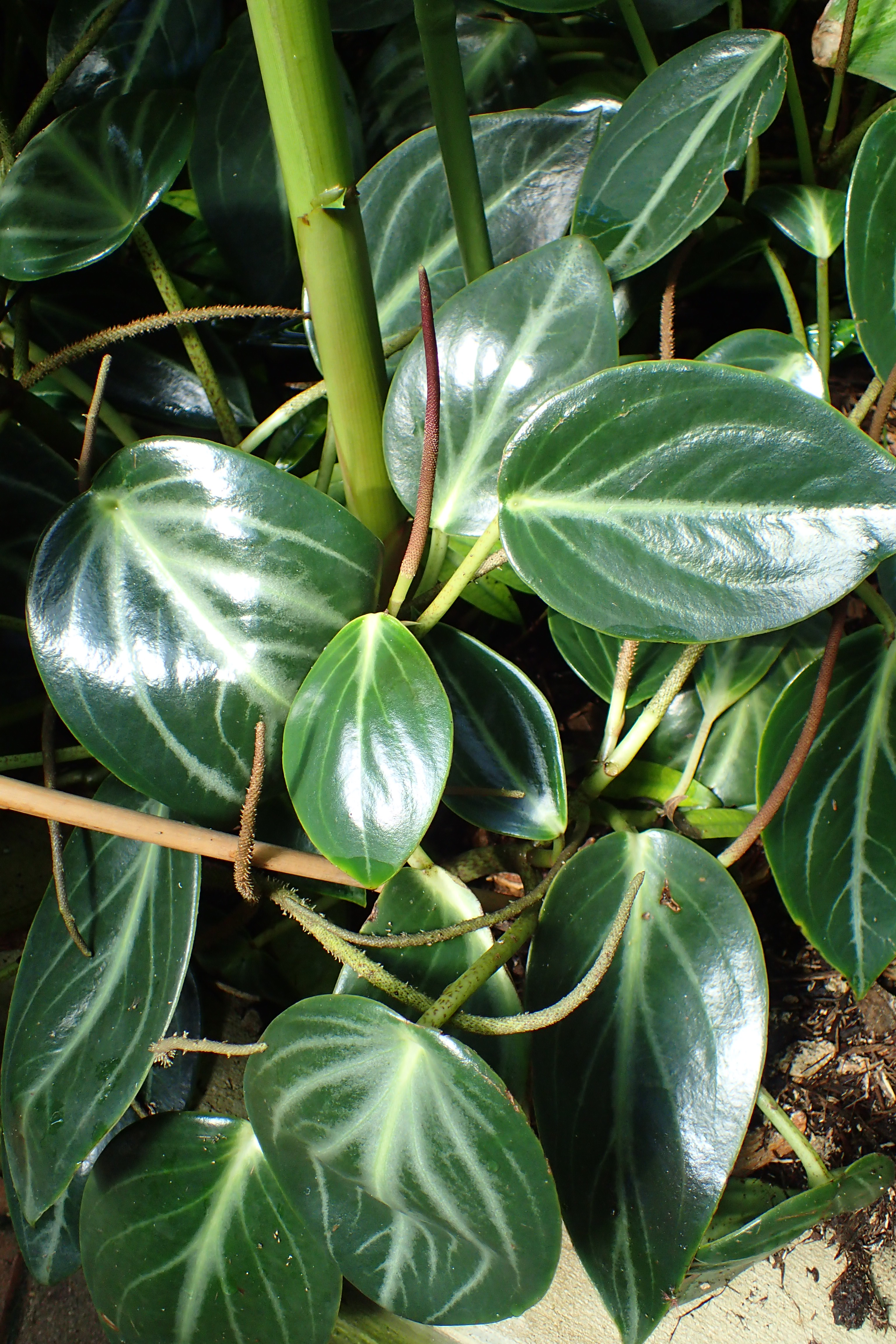
Peperomia maculosa

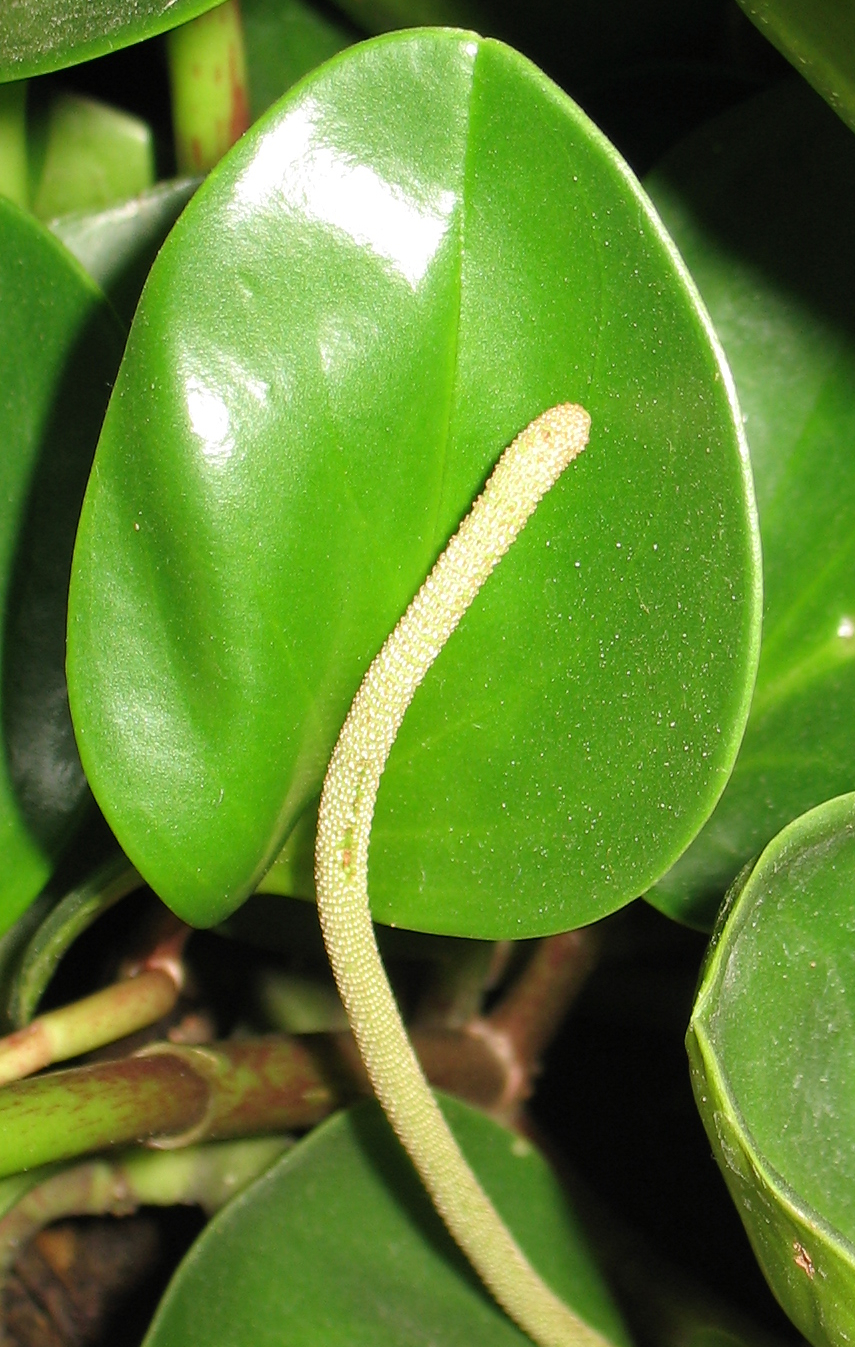
Peperomia obtusifolia leaf and flower spike

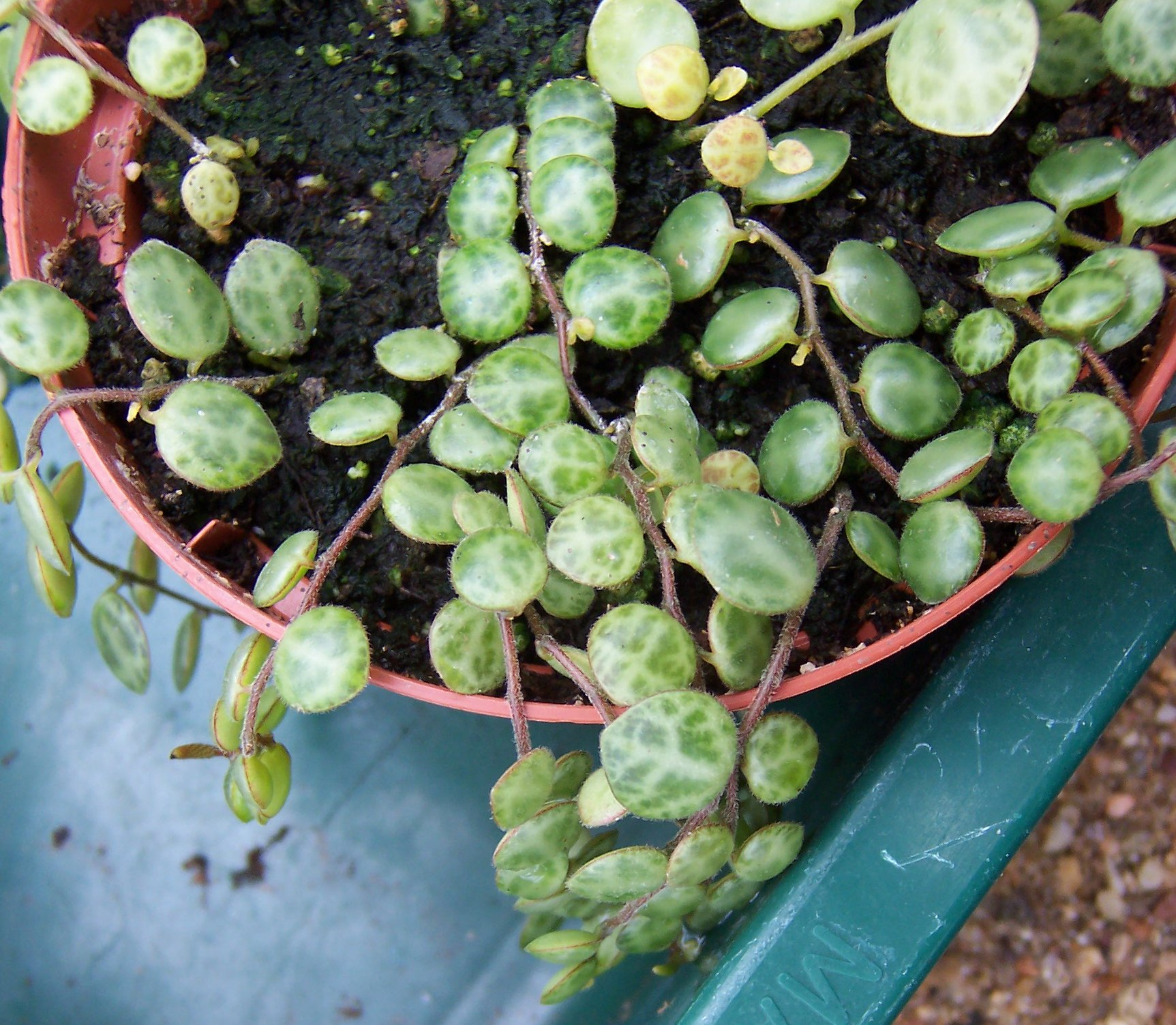
Peperomia prostrata, "string of turtles"

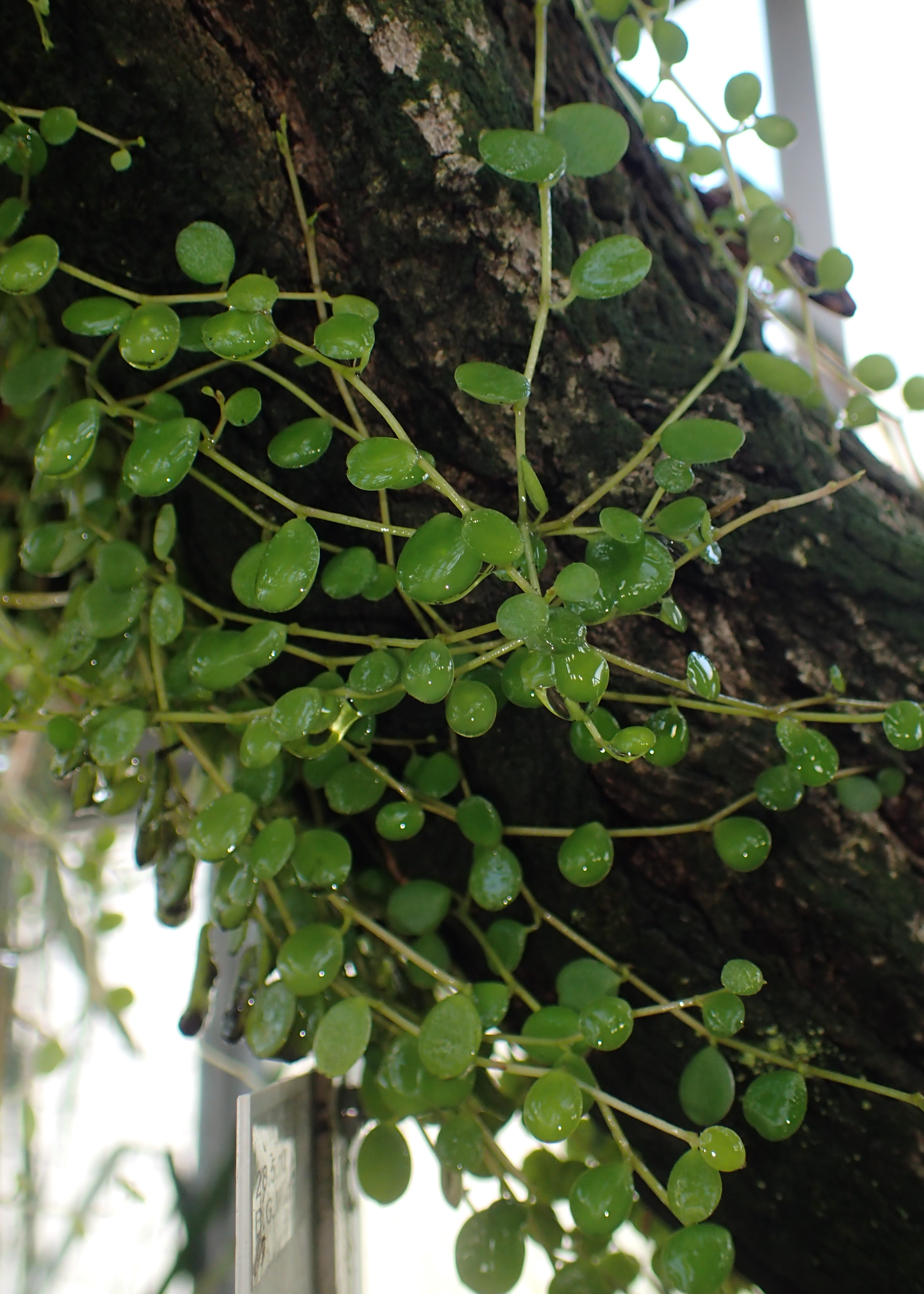
Peperomia rotundifolia growing on a tree

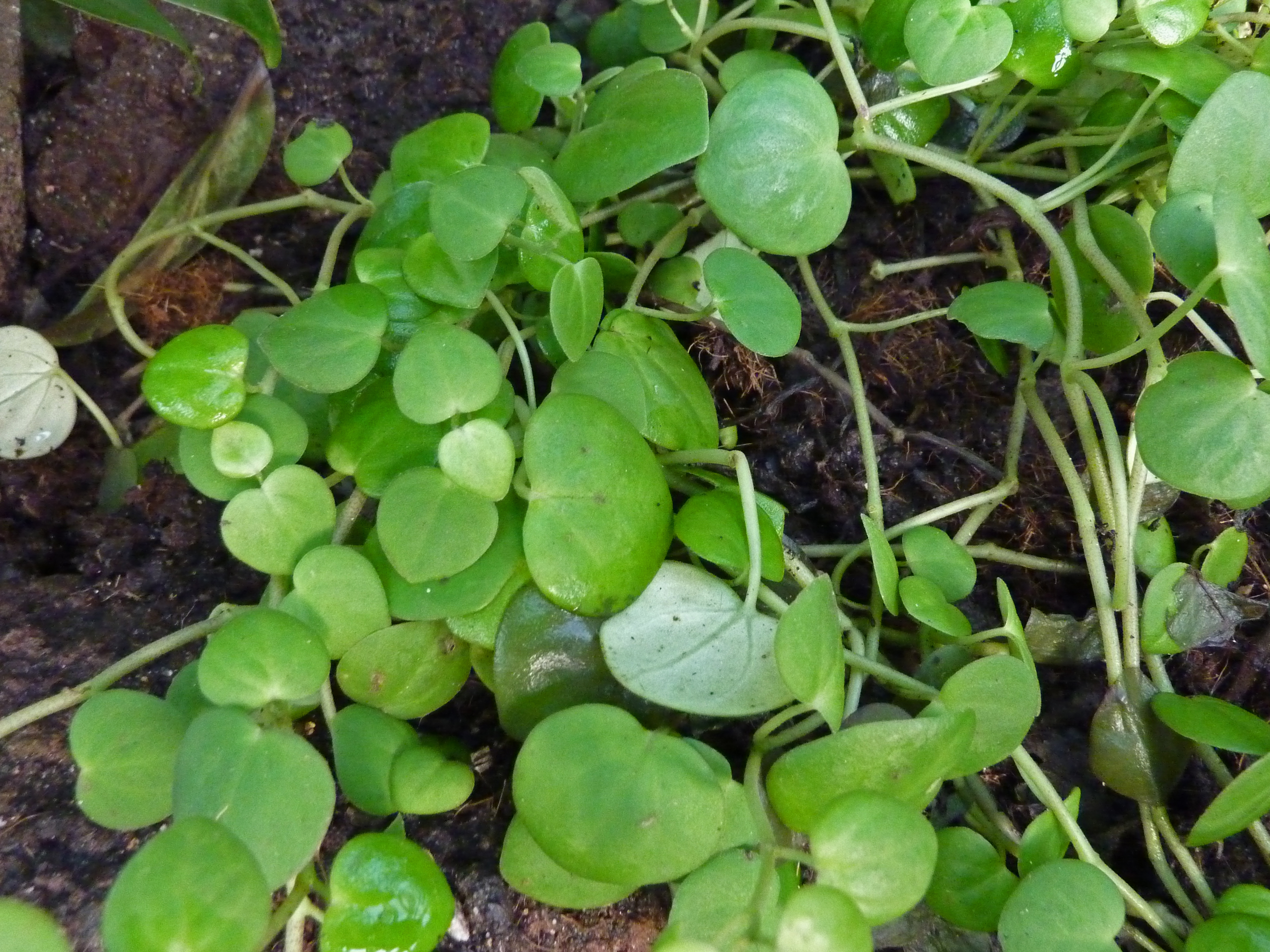
Peperomia serpens

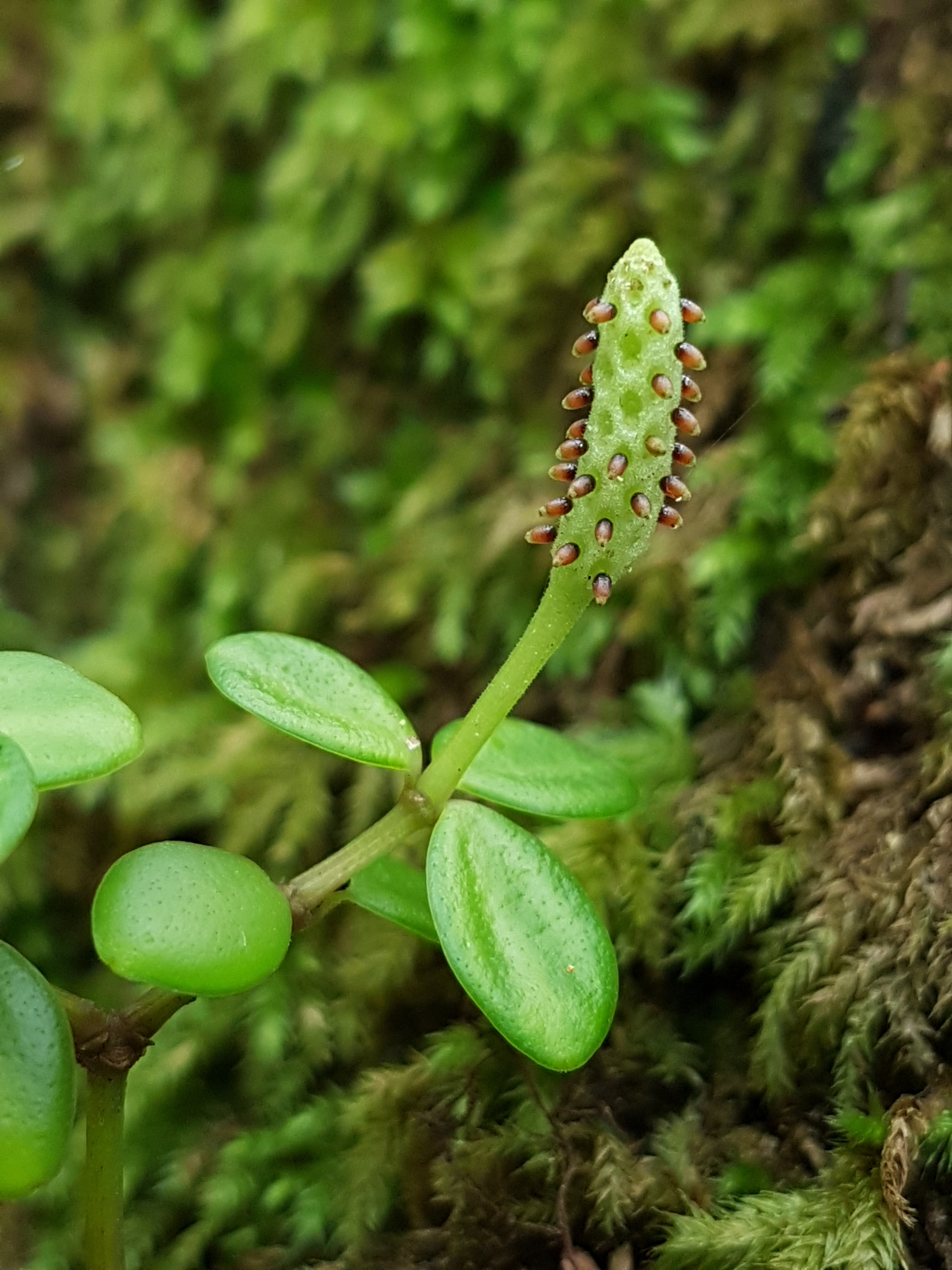
Peperomia tetraphylla with flower spike

=== Examples of arid climate succulent types ===
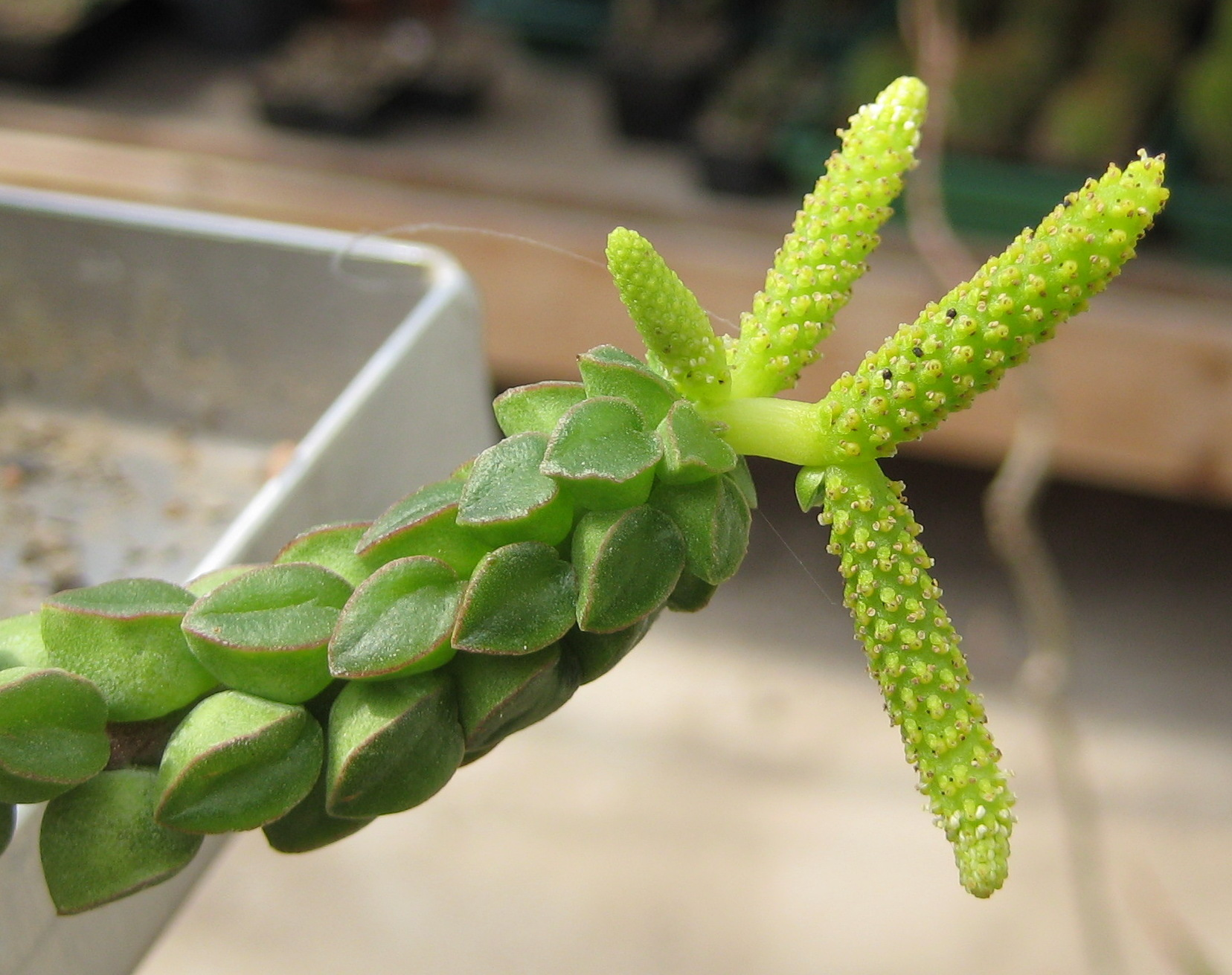
Peperomia columella

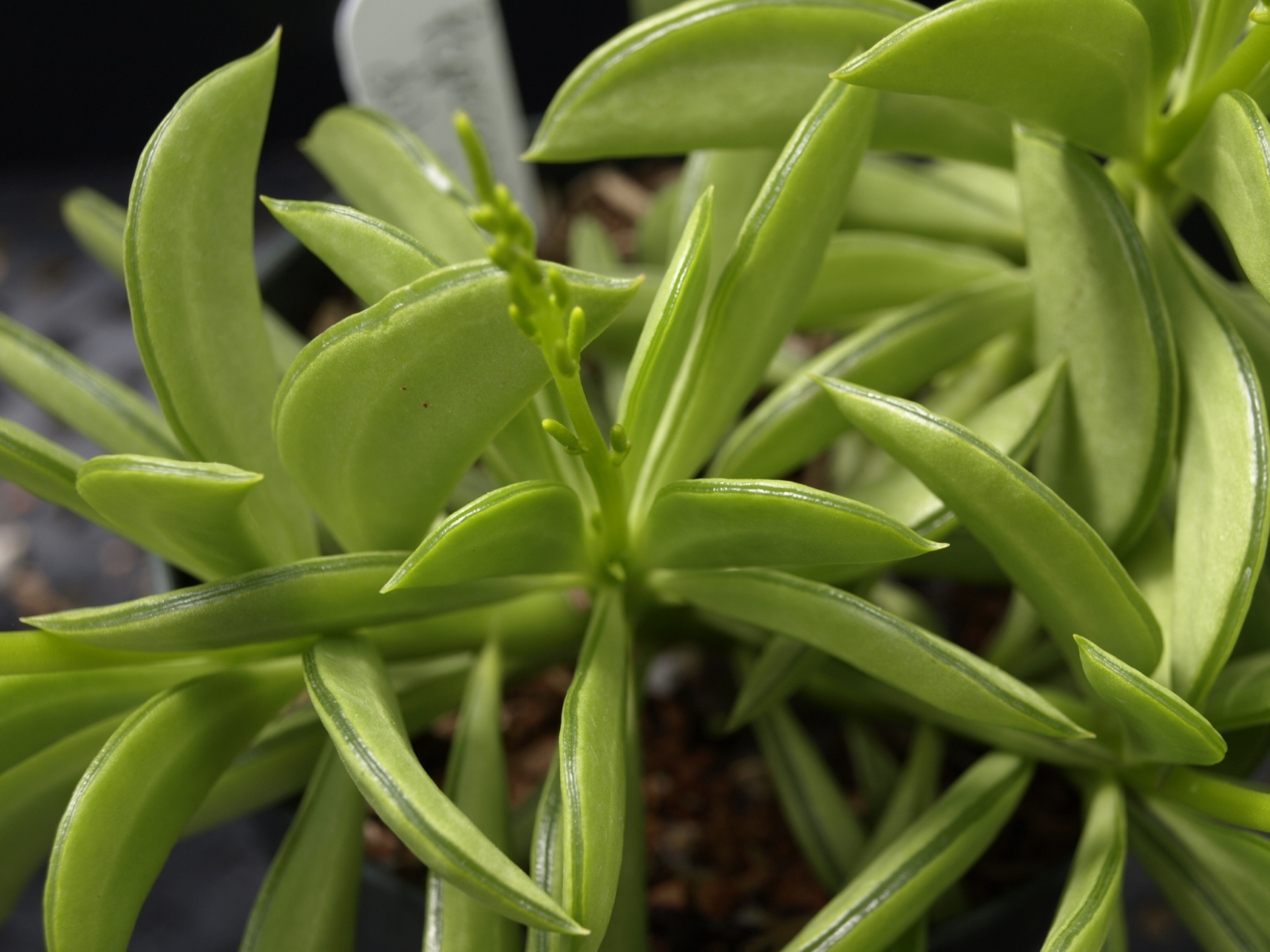
Peperomia dolabriformis

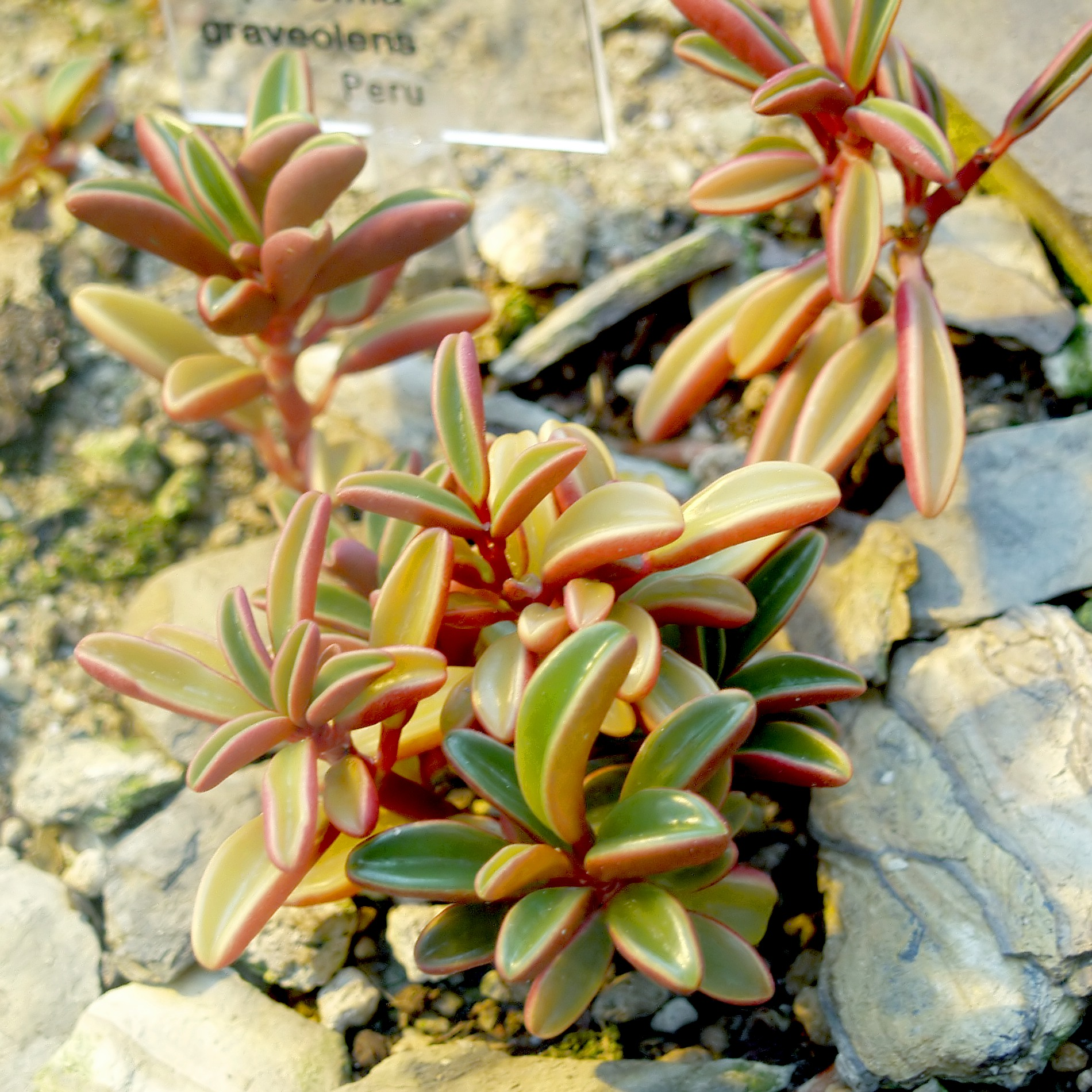
Peperomia graveolens

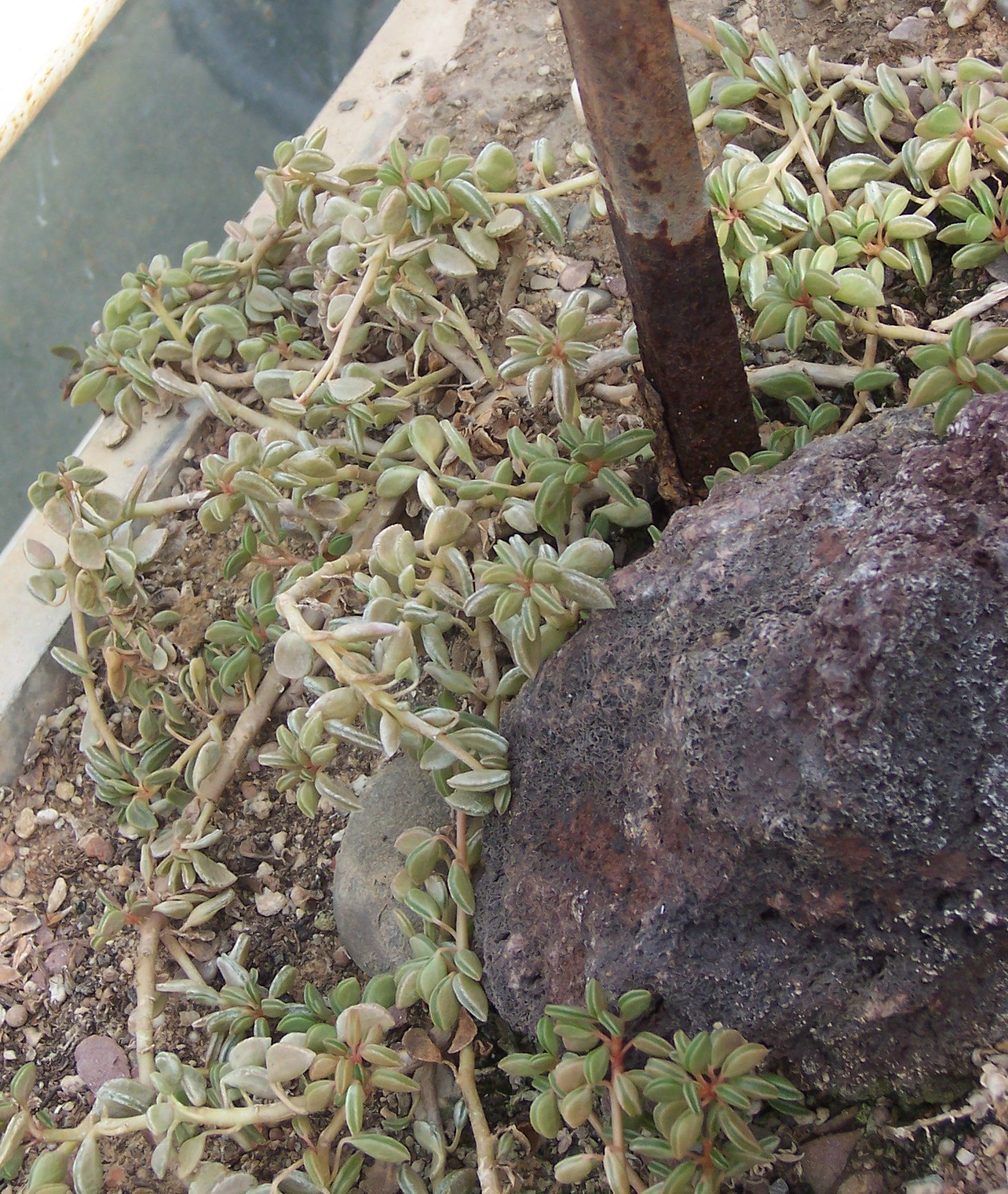
Peperomia nivalis

=== Examples of geophytic peperomias ===
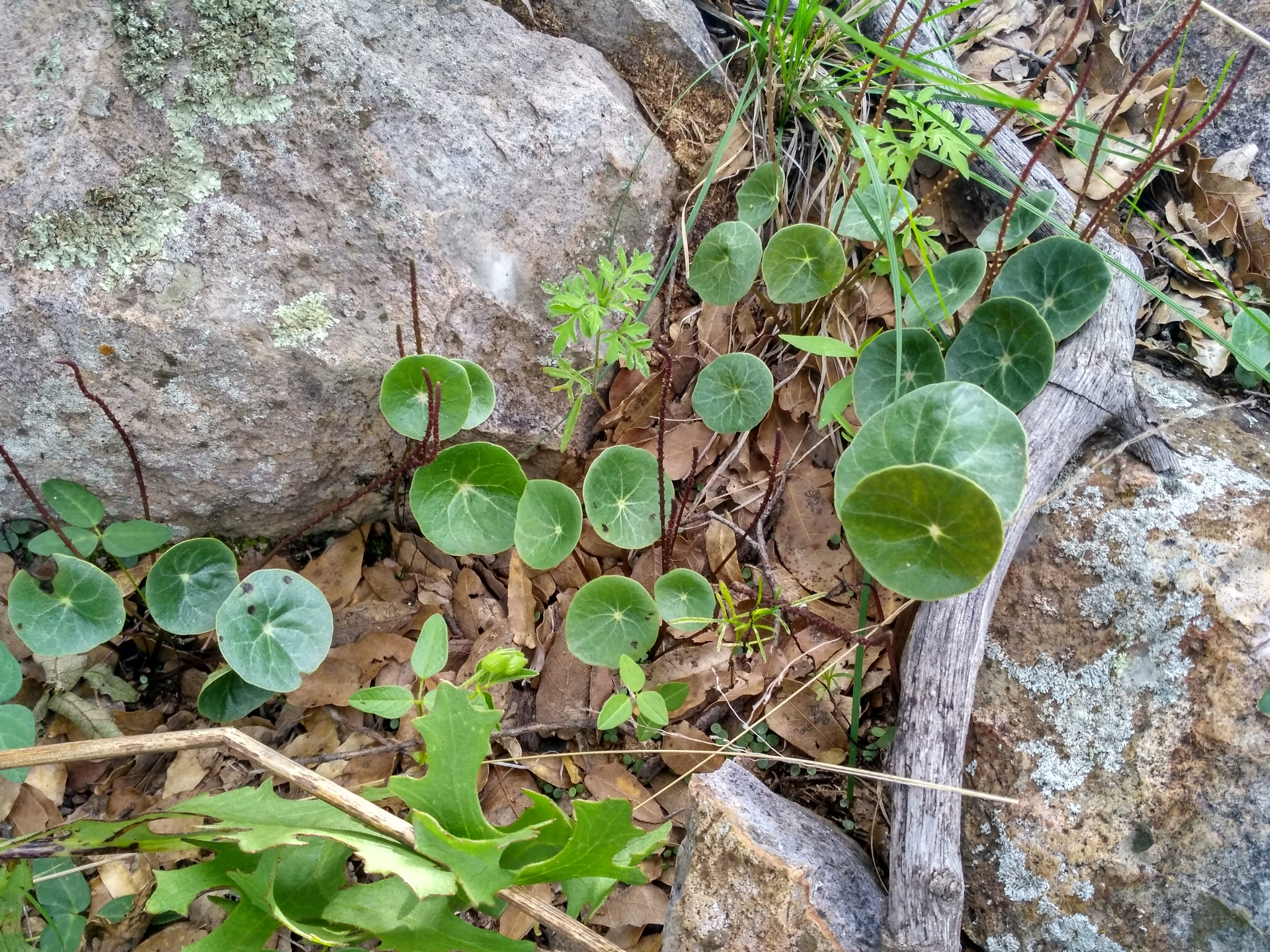
Peperomia bracteata

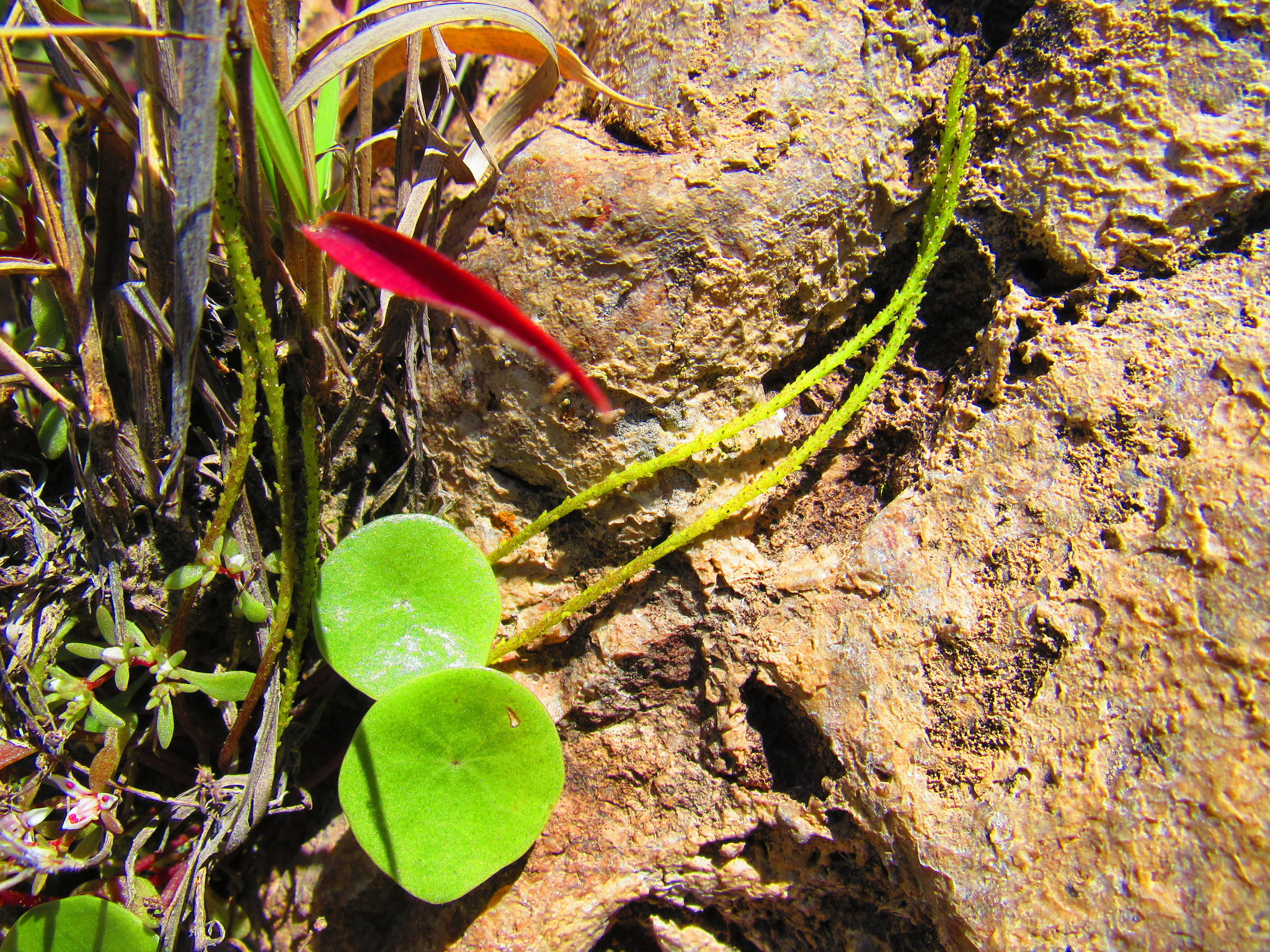
Peperomia monticola

== See also ==
- List of Peperomia species
- List of Peperomia diseases
