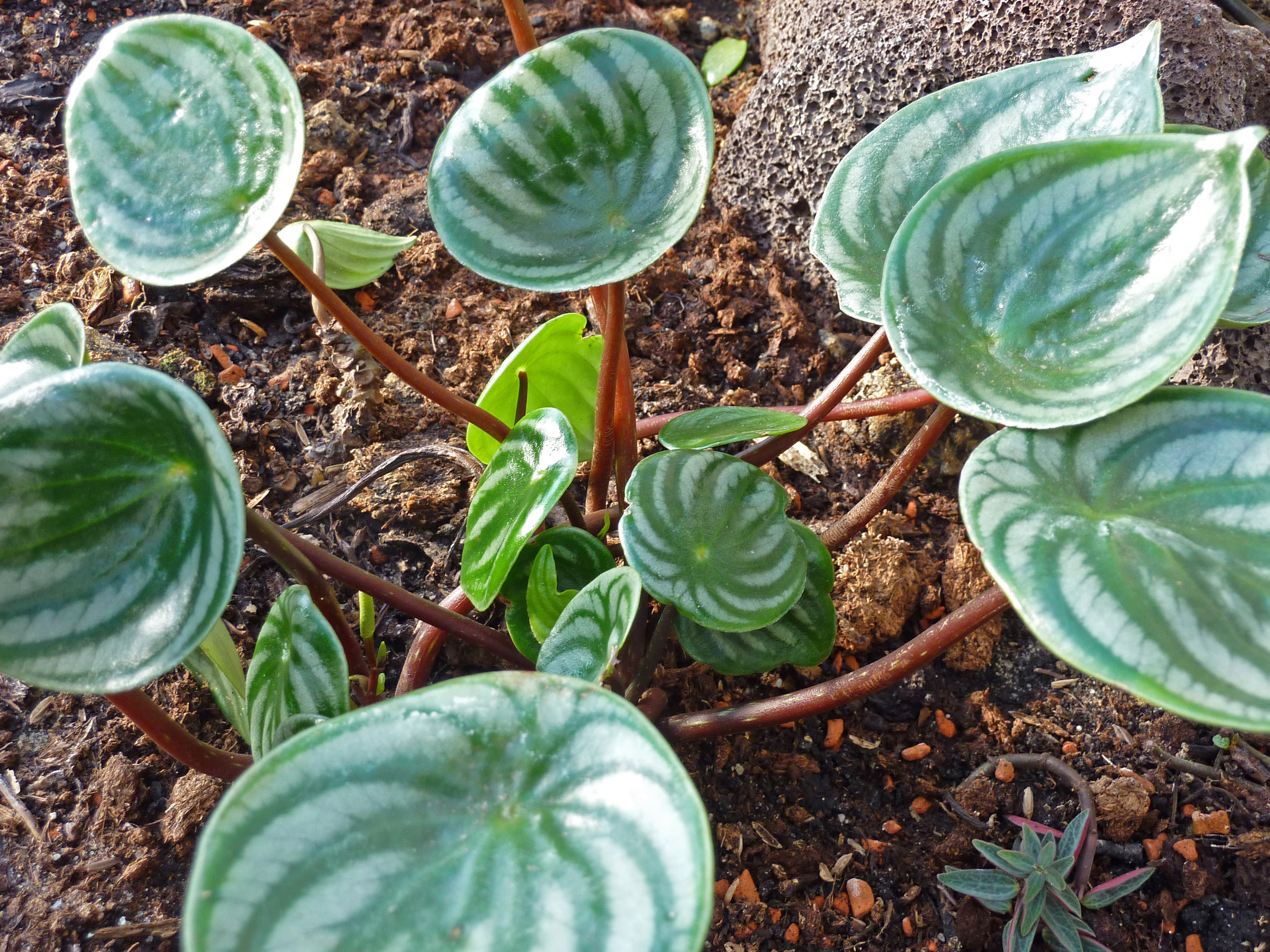

Scientific classification
- Kingdom: Plantae
- Clade: Tracheophytes
- Clade: Angiosperms
- Clade: Magnoliids
- Order: Piperales
- Family: Piperaceae
- Genus: Peperomia
- Species: P. argyreia

Binomial name
- Peperomia argyreia (Miq.) E.Morren

= Peperomia argyreia =

Species of flowering plant

Peperomia argyreia, the watermelon peperomia, is a species of flowering plant in the pepper family Piperaceae, native to northern South America, including Bolivia, Brazil, Ecuador, and Venezuela. The plant is not closely related to either watermelons or begonias. These terms relate to the shape, markings and texture of the leaves. Growing to 20 cm (7.9 in) tall and broad, it is an evergreen perennial with asymmetrical oval green leaves, slightly fleshy, strikingly marked with curved silver stripes, and red stems. Tiny green flower spikes appear in summer.

The Latin specific epithet argyreia means "silvery".

This decorative plant is valued in cultivation, and in temperate areas is generally grown as a houseplant at a minimum temperature of 10 °C (50 °F), in bright light but not direct sun. It has gained the Royal Horticultural Society's Award of Garden Merit.

It is non-toxic to animals according to ASPCA.
