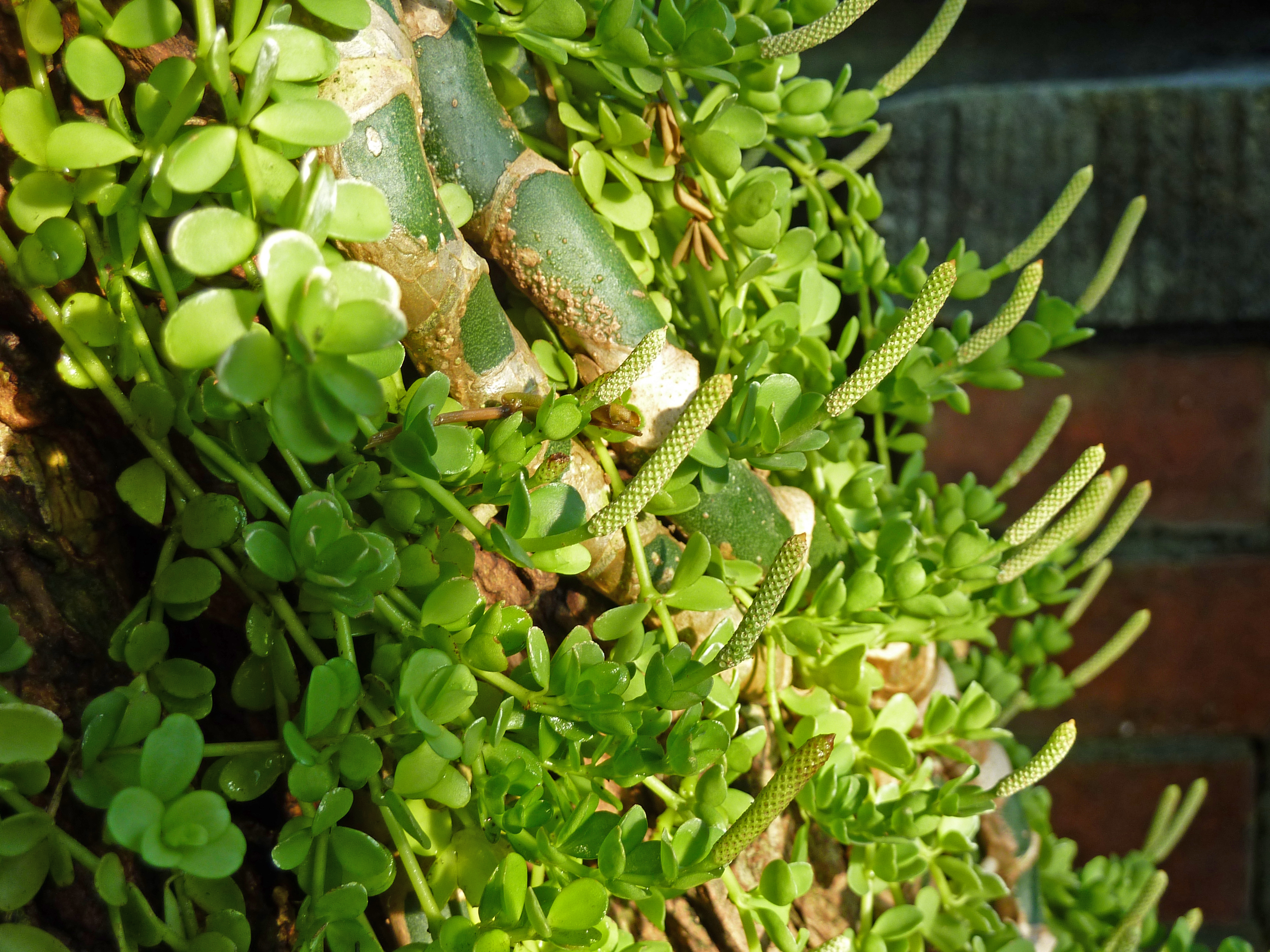

Scientific classification
- Kingdom: Plantae
- Clade: Tracheophytes
- Clade: Angiosperms
- Clade: Magnoliids
- Order: Piperales
- Family: Piperaceae
- Genus: Peperomia
- Species: P. hoffmannii

Binomial name
- Peperomia hoffmannii C.DC.

= Peperomia hoffmannii =

Species of plant

Peperomia hoffmannii is a species of plant in the genus Peperomia of the family Piperaceae. Its native range reaches from Mexico to Peru.
