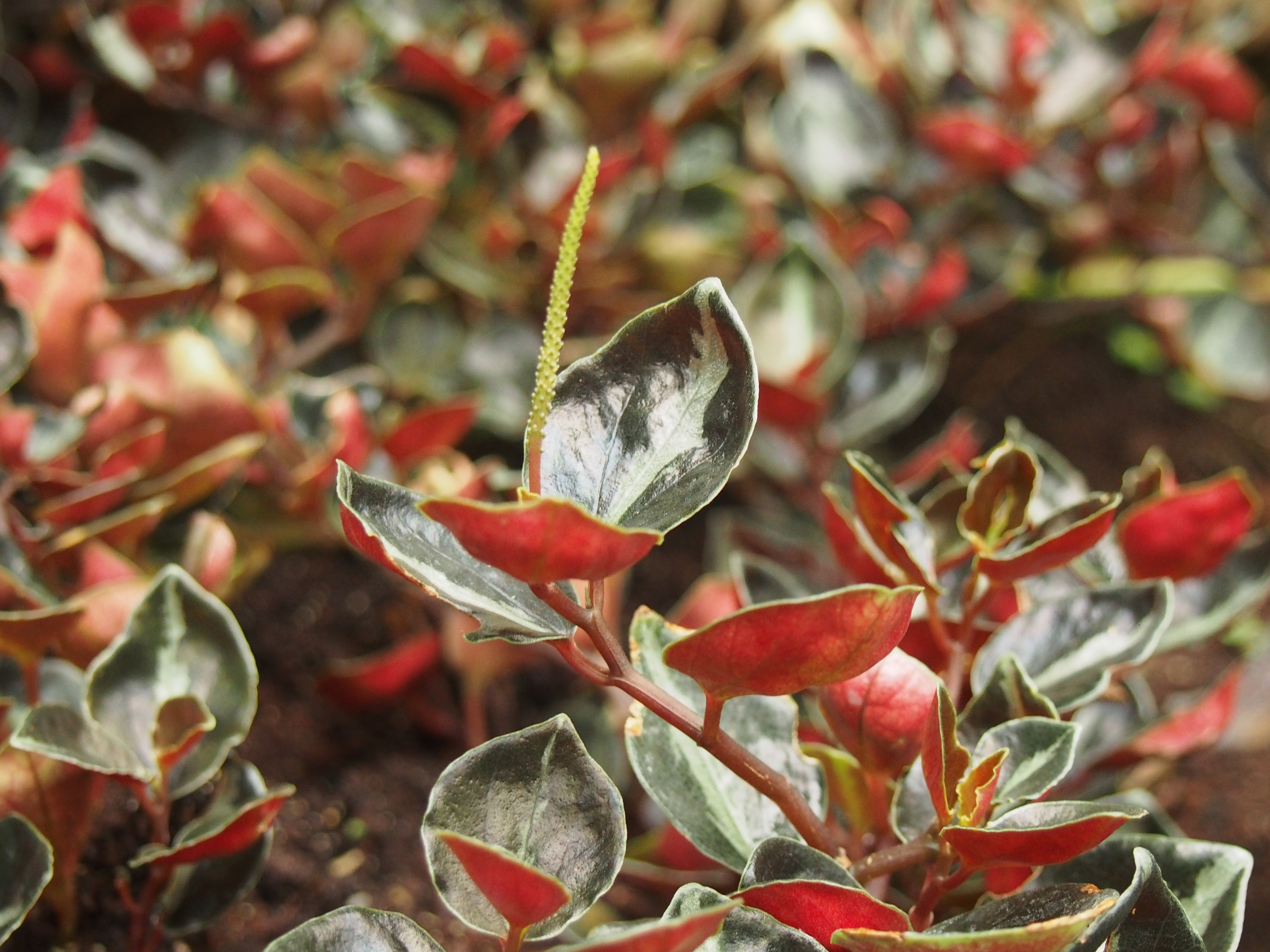
- Peperomia metallica

Scientific classification
- Kingdom: Plantae
- Clade: Tracheophytes
- Clade: Angiosperms
- Clade: Magnoliids
- Order: Piperales
- Family: Piperaceae
- Genus: Peperomia
- Species: P. metallica

Binomial name
- Peperomia metallica L.Linden & Rodigas

= Peperomia metallica =

Species of plant

Peperomia metallica is a species of plant in the genus Peperomia of the family Piperaceae. It is native to Peru.
