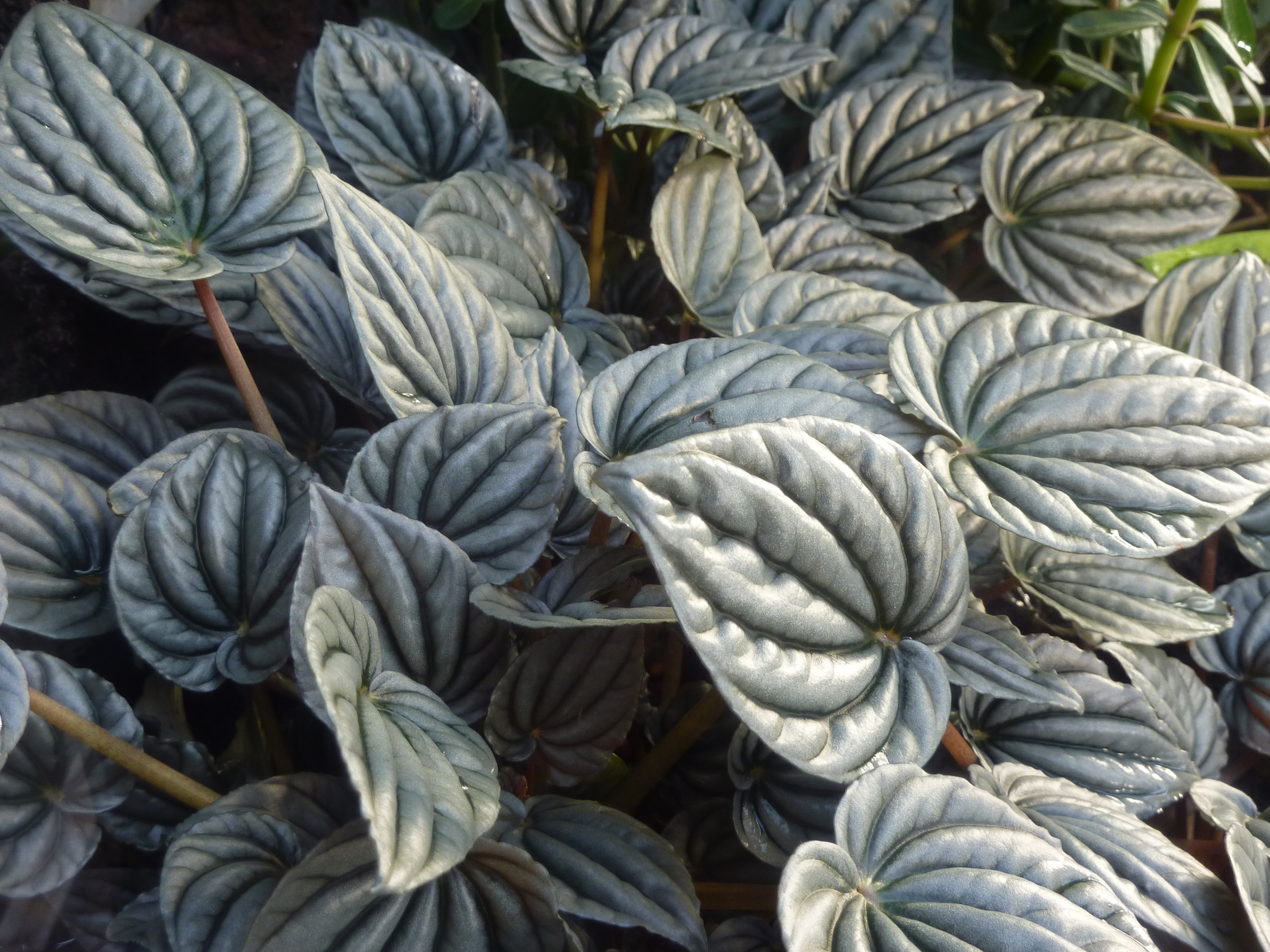

Scientific classification
- Kingdom: Plantae
- Clade: Tracheophytes
- Clade: Angiosperms
- Clade: Magnoliids
- Order: Piperales
- Family: Piperaceae
- Genus: Peperomia
- Species: P. griseoargentea

Binomial name
- Peperomia griseoargentea Yunck.

= Peperomia griseoargentea =

Species of flowering plant

Peperomia griseoargentea, the ivy peperomia, is a species of flowering plant in the family Piperaceae, native to Brazil.

This evergreen perennial forms rosettes of heart-shaped silver-gray leaves with heavy curved veining. It grows to about 50 cm (20 in) tall and broad. With a minimum temperature of 10 °C (50 °F) it is treated as a houseplant in temperate regions. However it may be placed outdoors in the summer months, in a sheltered position with some shade.

It holds the Royal Horticultural Society's Award of Garden Merit.
