= Peperomia umbilicata =

Scientific classification
- Kingdom: Plantae
- Clade: Tracheophytes
- Clade: Angiosperms
- Clade: Magnoliids
- Order: Piperales
- Family: Piperaceae
- Genus: Peperomia
- Species: P. umbilicata

Binomial name
- Peperomia umbilicata Ruiz & Pav.

Synonyms
- Piper umbilicatum (Ruiz & Pav.) Vahl; Tildenia peruviana Miq.; Peperomia gaudichaudii A.W.Hill; Peperomia hillii Trel.; Peperomia umbilicata f. major A.W.Hill; Piper globosum Poir.

Species of plant

Peperomia umbilicata is a species of flowering plant in the family Piperaceae. It is endemic to Peru. It is a geophytic plant, storing water and reserves in an underground tuber. During dry periods parts above ground, such as leaves, will wither away but the plant will survive due to the tuber. When more rain falls the plant regrows its stalks and leaves on the surface.
