= Peperomia verschaffeltii =

Scientific classification
- Kingdom: Plantae
- Clade: Tracheophytes
- Clade: Angiosperms
- Clade: Magnoliids
- Order: Piperales
- Family: Piperaceae
- Genus: Peperomia
- Species: P. verschaffeltii

Binomial name
- Peperomia verschaffeltii Linden

Synonyms
- Peperomia sarcostachya Trel.

Species of plant

Peperomia verschaffeltii is a species of plant in the genus Peperomia of the family Piperaceae. It is native to Peru.
