= Peperomia congona =

Scientific classification
- Kingdom: Plantae
- Clade: Tracheophytes
- Clade: Angiosperms
- Clade: Magnoliids
- Order: Piperales
- Family: Piperaceae
- Genus: Peperomia
- Species: P. congona

Binomial name
- Peperomia congona Sodiro

Species of plant

Peperomia congona is a species of plant in the genus Peperomia. Its native range is Ecuador and Peru.
