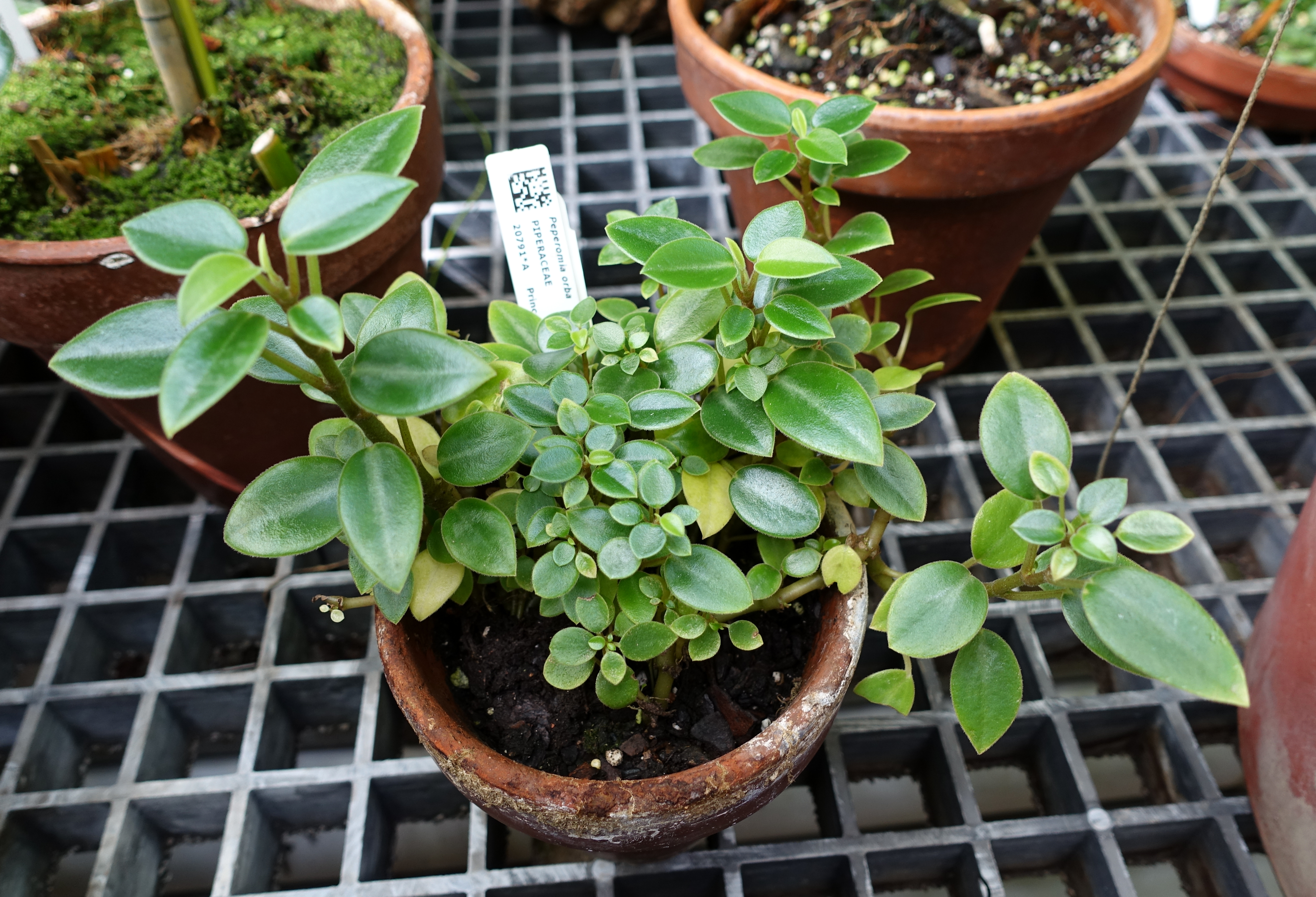

Scientific classification
- Kingdom: Plantae
- Clade: Tracheophytes
- Clade: Angiosperms
- Clade: Magnoliids
- Order: Piperales
- Family: Piperaceae
- Genus: Peperomia
- Species: P. orba

Binomial name
- Peperomia orba G.S.Bunting

= Peperomia orba =

Species of plant

Peperomia orba is a species of plant in the genus Peperomia of the family Piperaceae.

The plant is only known from cultivation, its native range is unknown. Therefore the name is considered unplaced and unaccepted. G.S. Bunting named the plant based on samples in cultivation, obtained from greenhouses of University of Gothenburg with no knowledge of their further origins. Because of this he used the epithet orba meaning "orphan" in Latin. Before Bunting the plant was known with various names including Peperomia Astrid, Peperomia Princess Astrid, Peperomia Pixie, and Peperomia Teardrop.
