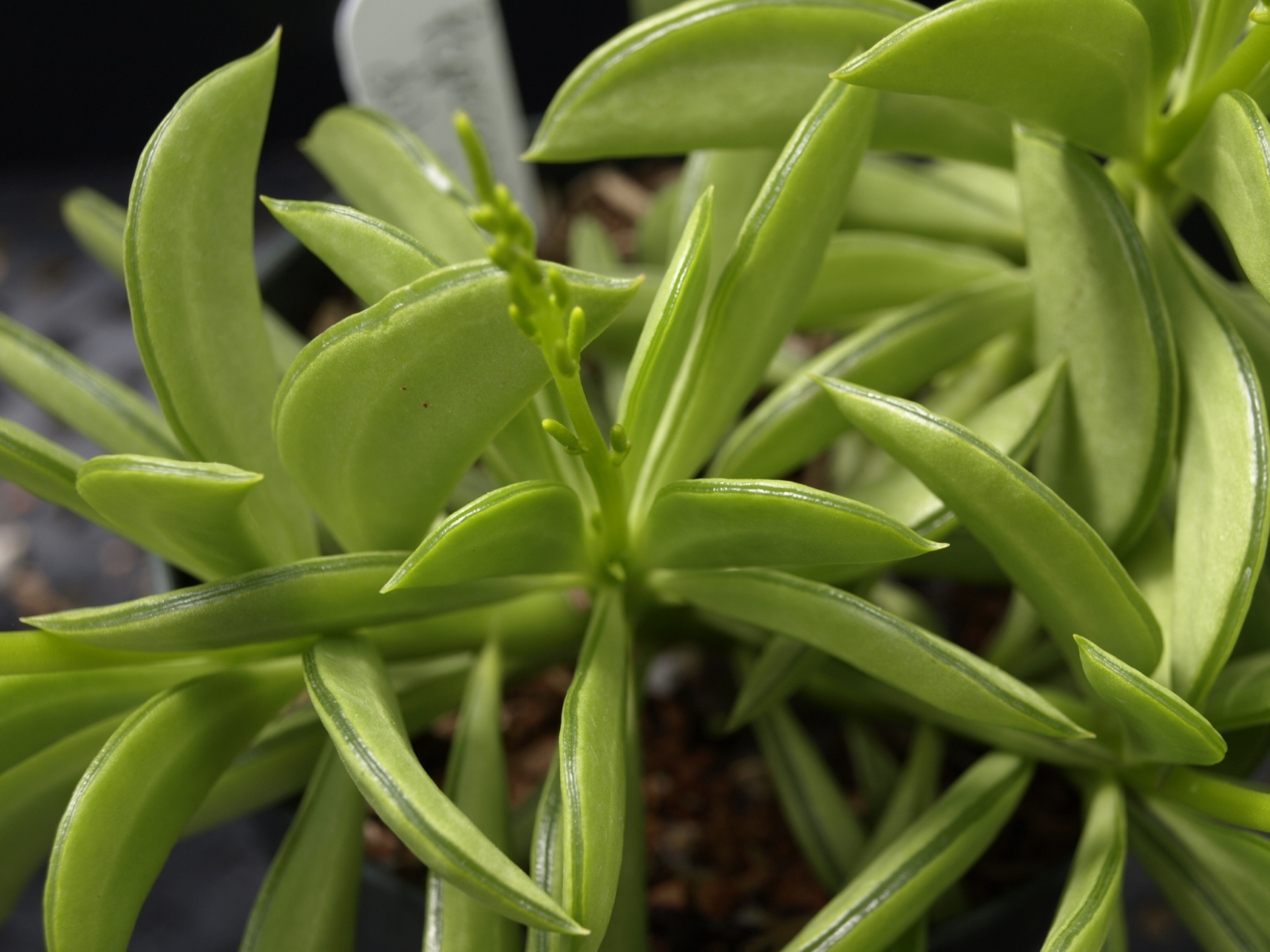
- Leaves and inflorescence of P. dolabriformis

Scientific classification
- Kingdom: Plantae
- Clade: Tracheophytes
- Clade: Angiosperms
- Clade: Magnoliids
- Order: Piperales
- Family: Piperaceae
- Genus: Peperomia
- Species: P. dolabriformis

Binomial name
- Peperomia dolabriformis Kunth

Synonyms
- Piper dolabriforme (Kunth) Poir.

= Peperomia dolabriformis =

Species of flowering plant

Peperomia dolabriformis is a species of plant in the genus Peperomia in the family Piperaceae. The species is also known as prayer pepper. The plant is used as an ornamental houseplant. It is native to Ecuador and Peru.

== Accepted varieties ==
- Peperomia dolabriformis var. brachyphylla Rauh
- Peperomia dolabriformis var. confertifolia Yunck.
- Peperomia dolabriformis var. glaucescens C.DC.
- Peperomia dolabriformis var. grandis Hutchison ex Pino & Klopf.
- Peperomia dolabriformis var. lombardii Pino
- Peperomia dolabriformis var. multicaulis Pino & Cieza
- Peperomia dolabriformis var. velutina Trel.
