= Peperomia macrorhiza =

Scientific classification
- Kingdom: Plantae
- Clade: Tracheophytes
- Clade: Angiosperms
- Clade: Magnoliids
- Order: Piperales
- Family: Piperaceae
- Genus: Peperomia
- Species: P. macrorhiza

Binomial name
- Peperomia macrorhiza Kunth

Species of plant

Peperomia macrorhiza is a species of plant in the genus Peperomia. It is endemic to Peru. It is a geophytic plant, storing water and reserves in an underground tuber. During dry periods parts above ground, such as leaves, will wither away but the plant will survive due to the tuber. When more rain falls the plant regrows its stalks and leaves on the surface.
