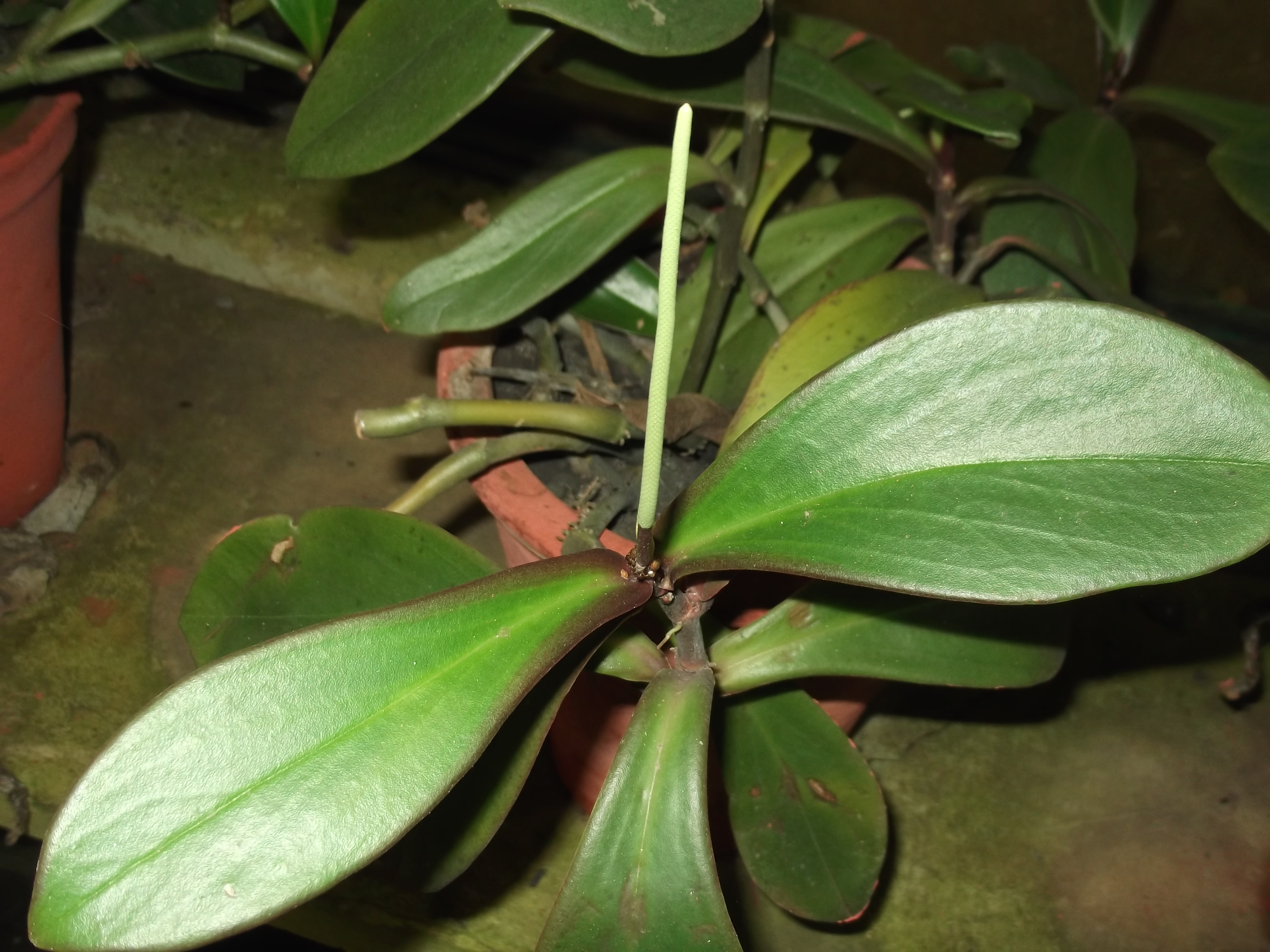

Scientific classification
- Kingdom: Plantae
- Clade: Tracheophytes
- Clade: Angiosperms
- Clade: Magnoliids
- Order: Piperales
- Family: Piperaceae
- Genus: Peperomia
- Species: P. clusiifolia

Binomial name
- Peperomia clusiifolia (Jacq.) Hook.

Synonyms
- Peperomia obtusifolia var. clusiaefolia (Jacq.) C. DC.; Piper clusiifolium Jacq.

= Peperomia clusiifolia =

Species of plant

Peperomia clusiifolia is a species of plant in the genus Peperomia. It is endemic to Jamaica. It is commonly known as red edge peperomia because its leaf margins are tinged with dark red. There are varieties where this red or lighter colors are shown as striking variegation. These are typically sold under names such as P. clusiifolia 'Variegata', P. 'Jellie', or P. 'Tricolor'.

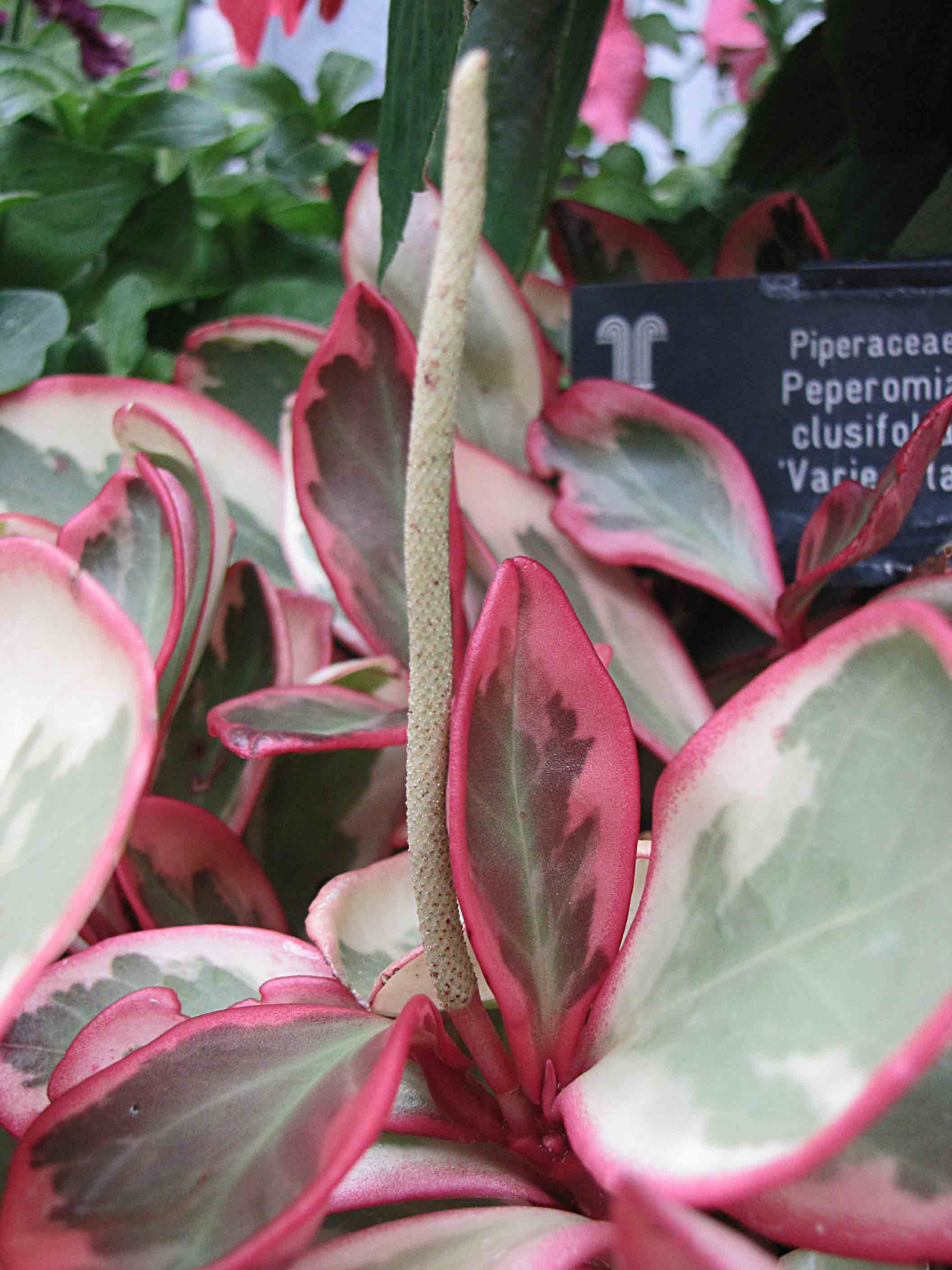
Peperomia clusiifolia variegata
