= Peperomia rugosa =

Scientific classification
- Kingdom: Plantae
- Clade: Tracheophytes
- Clade: Angiosperms
- Clade: Magnoliids
- Order: Piperales
- Family: Piperaceae
- Genus: Peperomia
- Species: P. rugosa

Binomial name
- Peperomia rugosa C.C.Berg, E.A.Mennega & Tolsma

Species of plant

Peperomia rugosa is a species of plant in the genus Peperomia of the family Piperaceae. It is native to Ecuador.
