= Peperomia kimnachii =

Scientific classification
- Kingdom: Plantae
- Clade: Tracheophytes
- Clade: Angiosperms
- Clade: Magnoliids
- Order: Piperales
- Family: Piperaceae
- Genus: Peperomia
- Species: P. kimnachii

Binomial name
- Peperomia kimnachii Rauh

Species of plant

Peperomia kimnachii is a species of plant in the genus Peperomia of the family Piperaceae. It is native to Bolivia, often growing as an epiphyte.

== Description ==
Peperomia kimnachii is a perennial shrub that puts out several branching shoots that can be over a meter in length. These creep prostrate and can root at the nodes, climbing onto surrounding plants or hang down. Its round (often slightly angled) internodes are elongated, 10 to 15 cm long and 5 to 10 mm thick, purple-red at the base and green above. Leaves grow in whorls, 3 to 8 together, their 3 to 5 cm long blades hard and erect with typically only the underside exposed to light. The oblong-lanceolate leaves are somewhat succulent, mat dark-green on the topside and light-green below.
