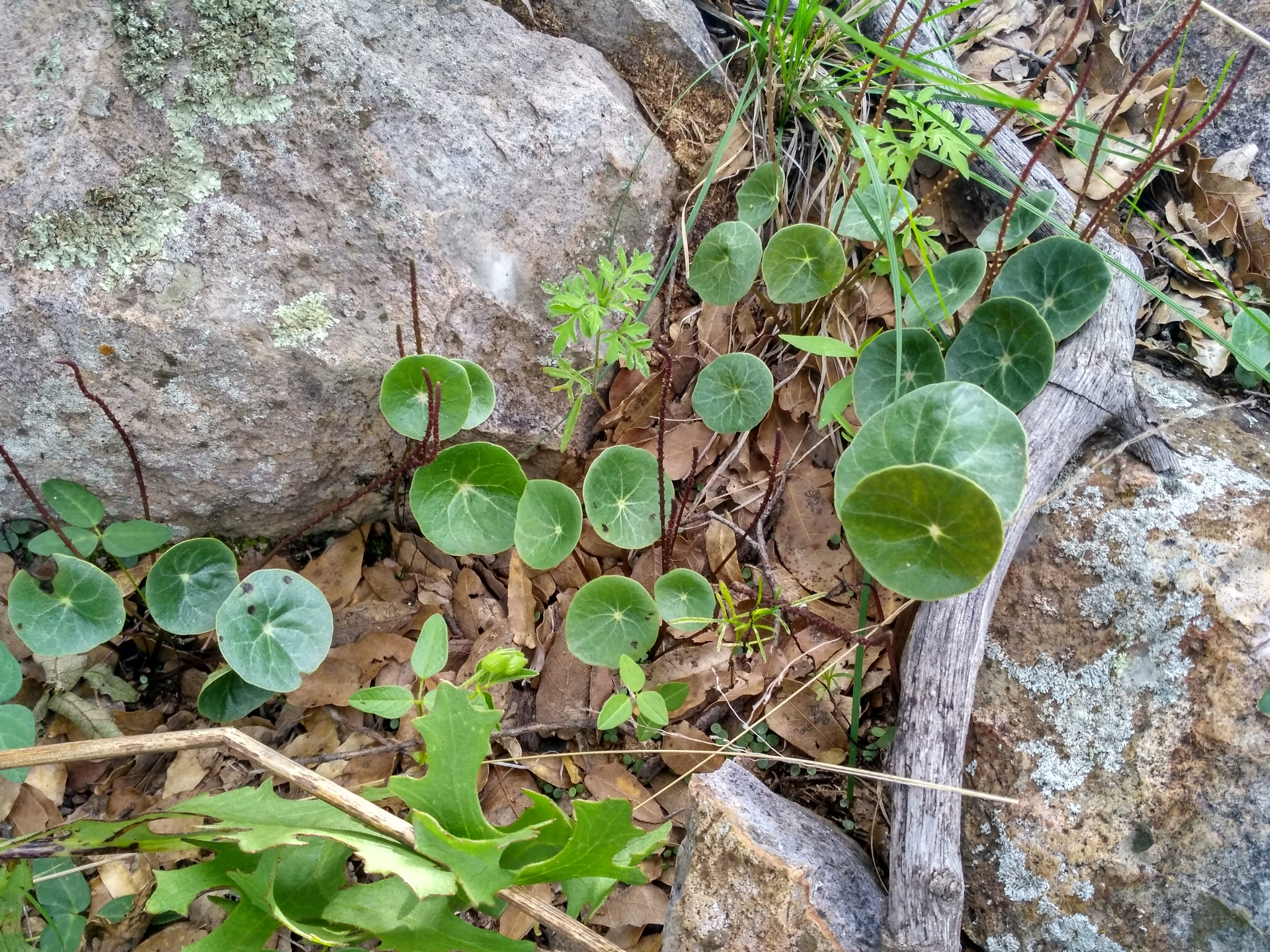

Scientific classification
- Kingdom: Plantae
- Clade: Tracheophytes
- Clade: Angiosperms
- Clade: Magnoliids
- Order: Piperales
- Family: Piperaceae
- Genus: Peperomia
- Species: P. bracteata

Binomial name
- Peperomia bracteata A.W.Hill

= Peperomia bracteata =

Species of plant

Peperomia bracteata is a species of plant in the genus Peperomia. Its native range covers Mexico and Guatemala. It is a geophytic plant, storing water and reserves in an underground tuber. During dry periods parts above ground, such as leaves, will wither away but the plant will survive due to the tuber. When more rain falls the plant regrows its stalks and leaves on the surface.
