= Peperomia turboensis =

Scientific classification
- Kingdom: Plantae
- Clade: Tracheophytes
- Clade: Angiosperms
- Clade: Magnoliids
- Order: Piperales
- Family: Piperaceae
- Genus: Peperomia
- Species: P. turboensis

Binomial name
- Peperomia turboensis Yunck.

Synonyms
- Peperomia buntingii Steyerm.

Species of plant

Peperomia turboensis is a species of plant in the genus Peperomia of the family Piperaceae. It is native to Colombia, growing as a subshrub primarily in wet tropical areas.
