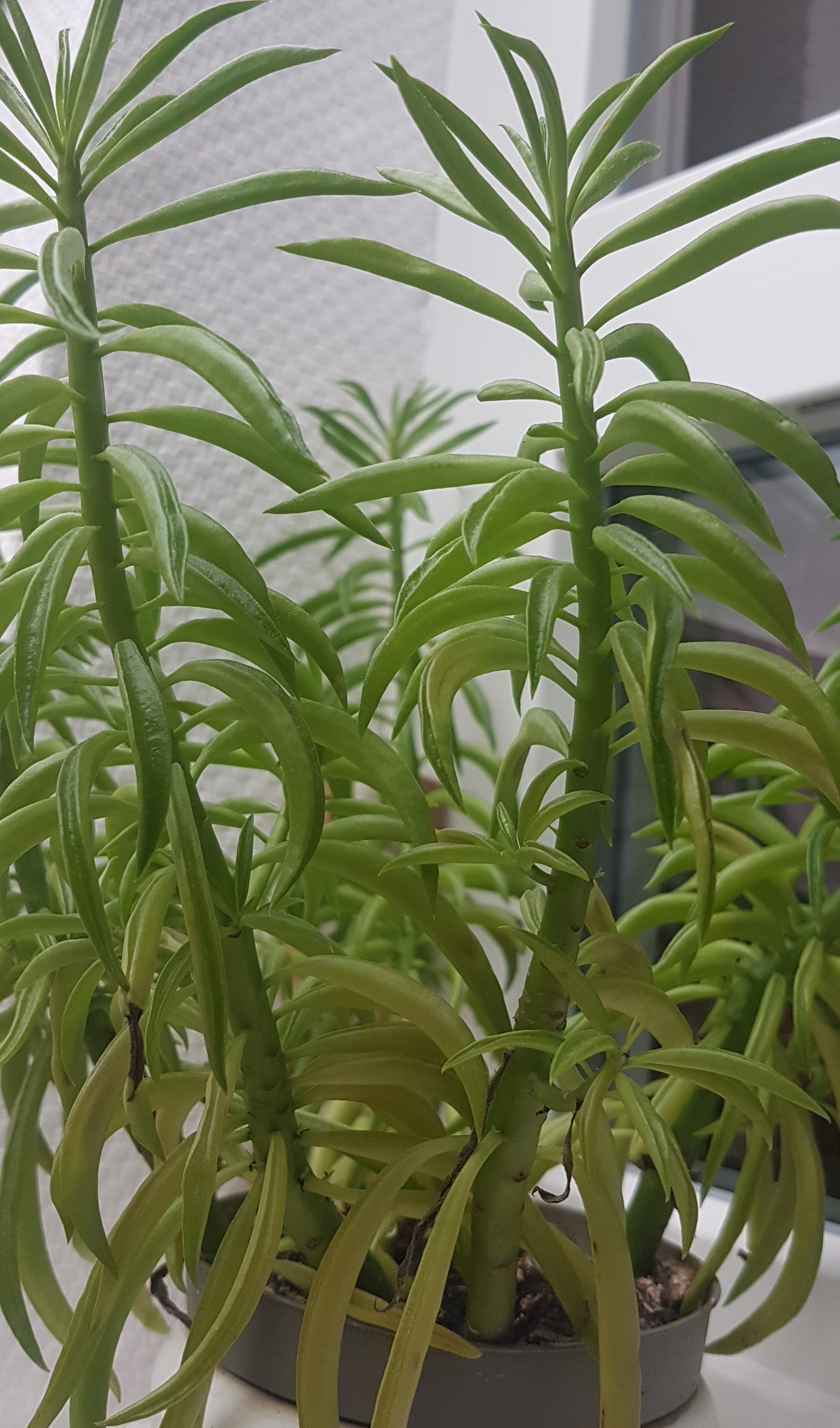

Scientific classification
- Kingdom: Plantae
- Clade: Tracheophytes
- Clade: Angiosperms
- Clade: Magnoliids
- Order: Piperales
- Family: Piperaceae
- Genus: Peperomia
- Species: P. ferreyrae

Binomial name
- Peperomia ferreyrae Yunck.

= Peperomia ferreyrae =

Species of plant

Peperomia ferreyrae is a species of plant in the genus Peperomia native to Peru. It is a small, succulent herb, growing erect to about 20 cm in height. The alternating, typically 3 to 5 cm long leaves, are in the form of tubes resembling green bean pods: U-shaped in cross-section with epidermal windows on the top-side.

Two varieties are known: P. ferreyrae and Peperomia ferreyrae var. musifolia. The variety musifolia is yellowish-green instead of bright green, grows slightly taller, and has leaves that are slightly shorter and thicker, tending to curve inwards rather than being straight. The leaf shape resembles an unripe banana, hence the epithet combines the words musa for banana and folia for leaf. This variety also grows on higher altitudes (over 2,000 meters elevation).
