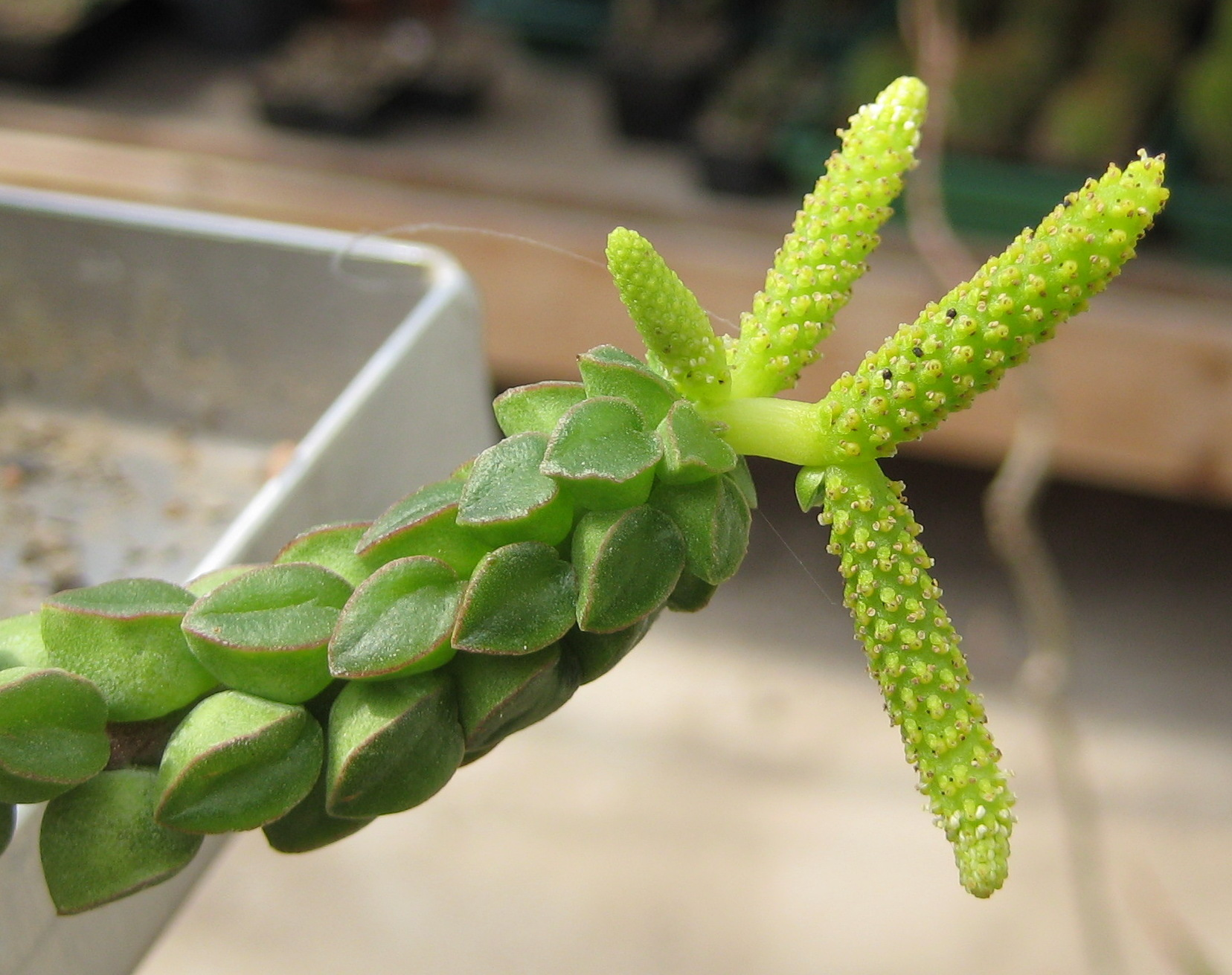

Scientific classification
- Kingdom: Plantae
- Clade: Tracheophytes
- Clade: Angiosperms
- Clade: Magnoliids
- Order: Piperales
- Family: Piperaceae
- Genus: Peperomia
- Species: P. columella

Binomial name
- Peperomia columella L.

= Peperomia columella =

Species of flowering plant

Peperomia columella is a species of plant in the family of Piperaceae. The species is endemic to Peru. It grows in dry areas, often in crevices on steep cliffs or in sandy soil.

It grows to about 20 cm in height, forming snake-like stems, which carry closely packed, succulent bright green leaves. The leaves are truncated, U-shape in cross-section, with epidermal windows on top.

It can be kept as a houseplant and has received the Award of Garden Merit by the Royal Horticultural Society.
