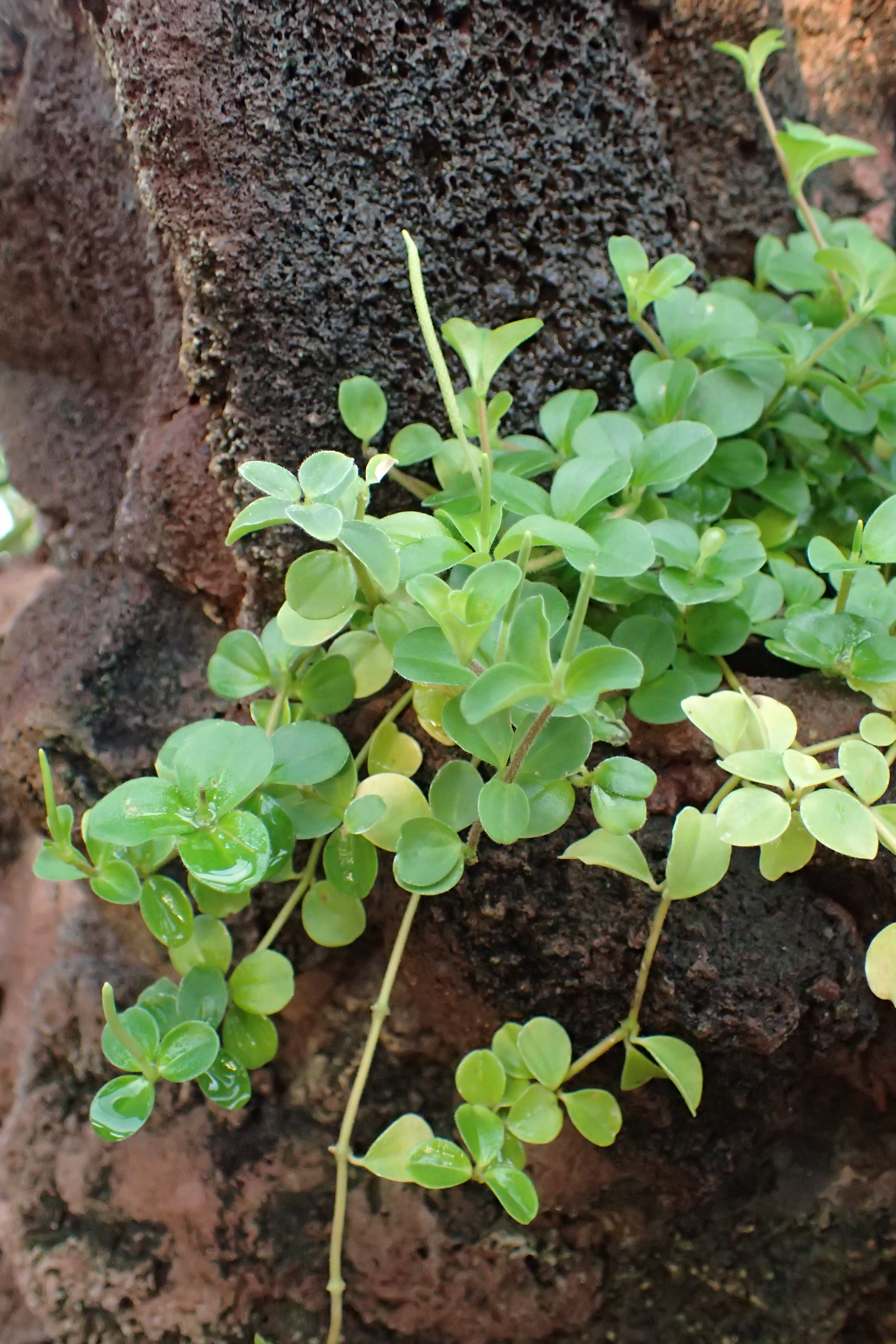

Scientific classification
- Kingdom: Plantae
- Clade: Tracheophytes
- Clade: Angiosperms
- Clade: Magnoliids
- Order: Piperales
- Family: Piperaceae
- Genus: Peperomia
- Species: P. trifolia

Binomial name
- Peperomia trifolia (L.) A.Dietr.

Synonyms
- List: Peperomia balbisii Dahlst.; Peperomia fimbriata Miq.; Peperomia fimbriata var. gracilior Dahlst.; Peperomia obovata (Vahl) C.DC.; Peperomia obversa (Vahl) A.Dietr.; Peperomia ovalifolia Hook.; Peperomia trifolia f. pilosior Dahlst.; Piper obovatum Vahl; Piper obversum Vahl; Piper orbiculatum Spreng.; Piper ovalifolium (Hook.) F.Dietr.; Piper trifolium L.; Schilleria obovata (Vahl) Kunth; Troxirum trifolium (L.) Raf.

= Peperomia trifolia =

Species of plant

Peperomia trifolia is a species of plant in the genus Peperomia. Its native range covers the Lesser Antilles and Trinidad.
