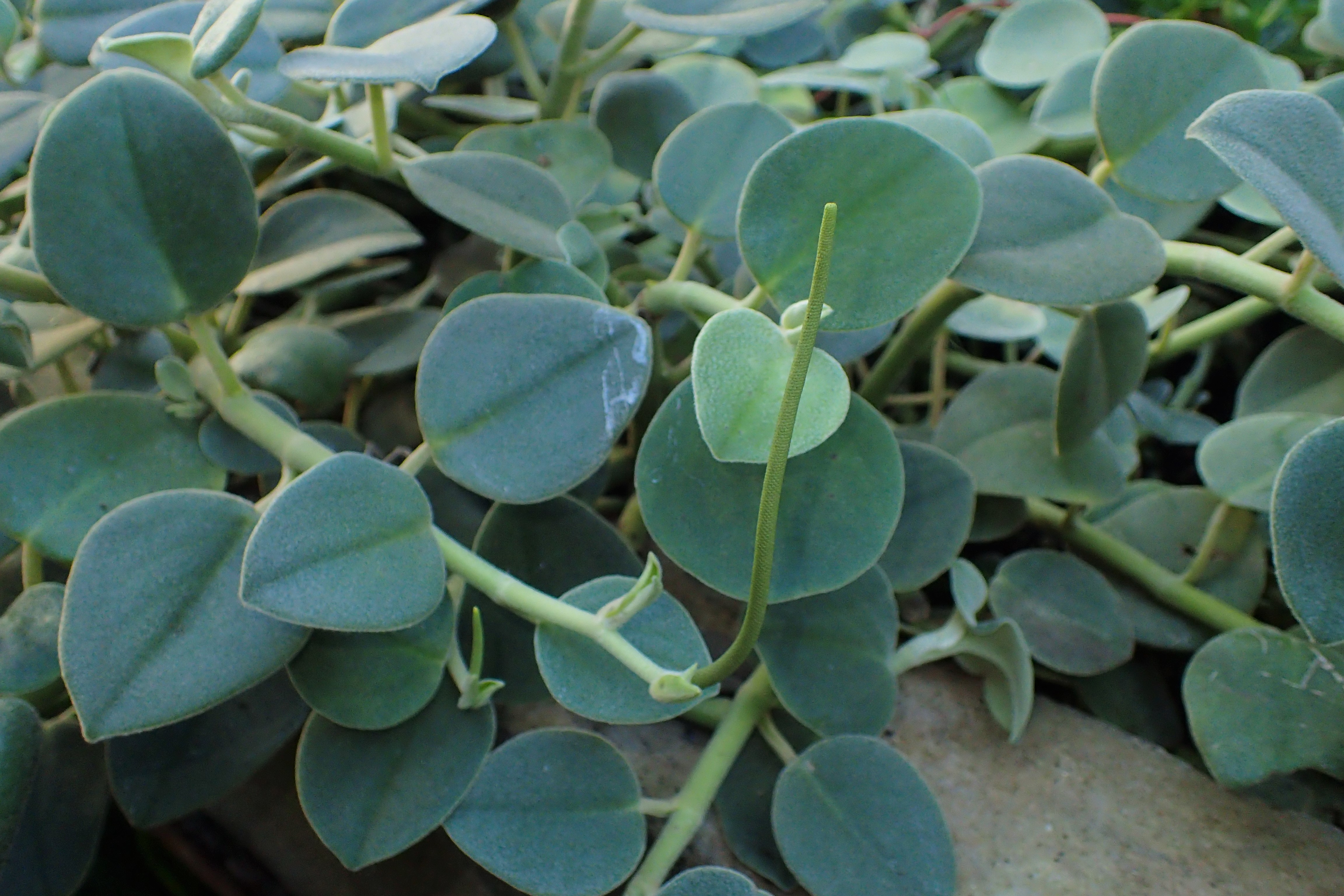

Scientific classification
- Kingdom: Plantae
- Clade: Tracheophytes
- Clade: Angiosperms
- Clade: Magnoliids
- Order: Piperales
- Family: Piperaceae
- Genus: Peperomia
- Species: P. incana

Binomial name
- Peperomia incana (Haw.) Hook.

Synonyms
- Piper incanum Haw.

= Peperomia incana =

Species of plant

Peperomia incana, commonly known as felted pepperface, is a species of plant in the genus Peperomia of the family Piperaceae. It is native to Brazil. Kept in cultivation at Kew Gardens since 1815, the species is notable among Peperomia for its thick, cordate leaves that are covered with a fuzzy, felt-like down.
