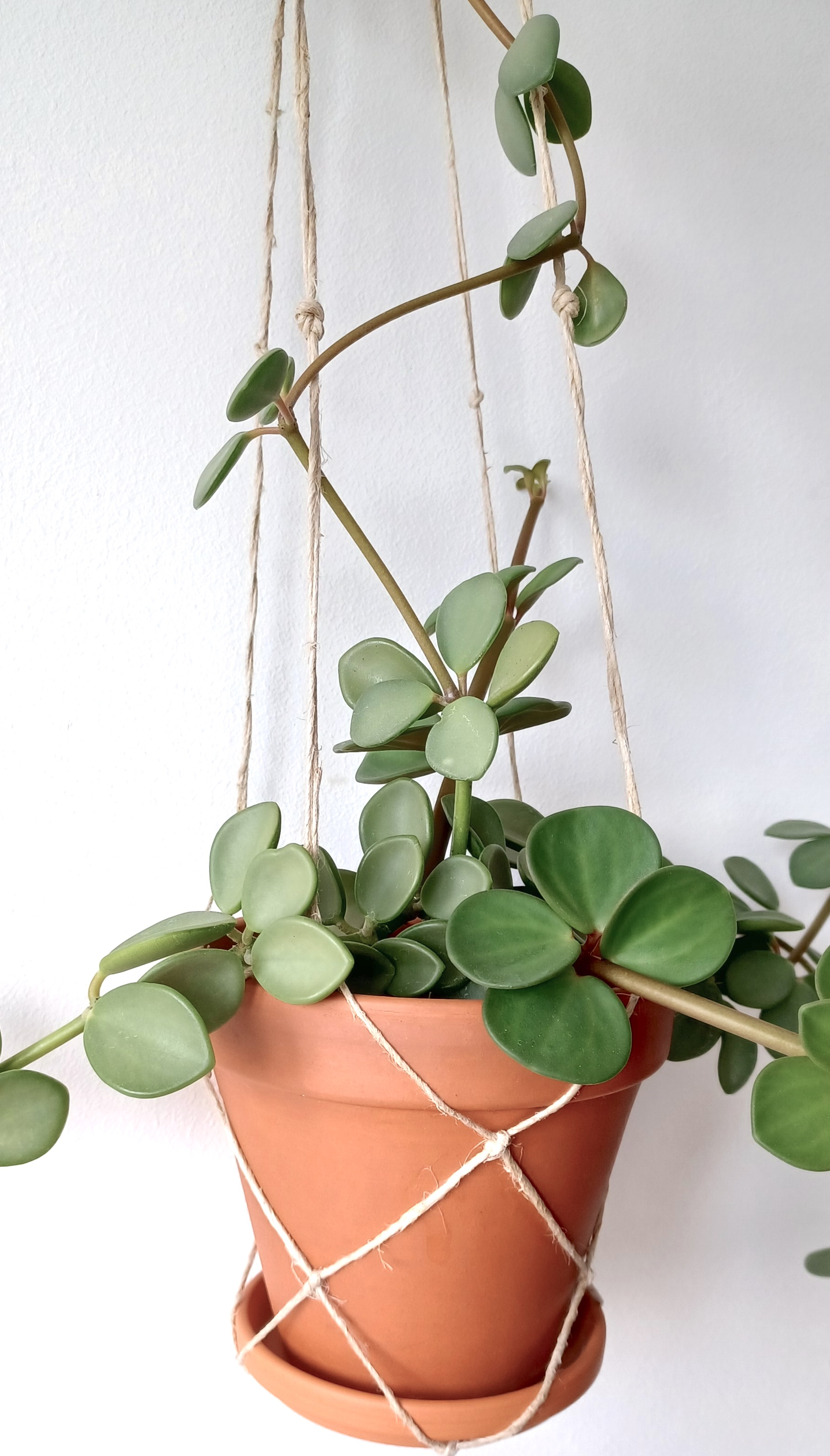
- Peperomia boivinii as a houseplant

Scientific classification
- Kingdom: Plantae
- Clade: Tracheophytes
- Clade: Angiosperms
- Clade: Magnoliids
- Order: Piperales
- Family: Piperaceae
- Genus: Peperomia
- Species: P. boivinii

Binomial name
- Peperomia boivinii C.DC.

Synonyms
- Peperomia humblotii C.DC.

= Peperomia boivinii =

Species of plant

Peperomia boivinii is a species of plant in the genus Peperomia of the family Piperaceae. It is endemic to the Comoro Islands situated between the southeastern coast of Africa and Madagascar. It is sometimes called the jade peperomia.

The artificial hybrid variety Peperomia 'Hope' (a cross between P. deppeana and P. quadrifolia) shares a superficial similarity with P. boivinii and these two are sometimes mixed. However, P. boivinii is clearly more of a succulent variety with stockier and thicker leaves. In addition, the leaves of Peperomia 'Hope' show a more distinct venation while P. boivinii leaves can be rather uniform matt olive green.
