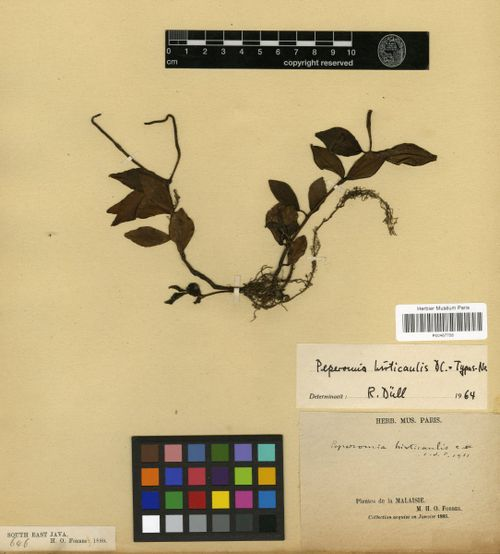

Scientific classification
- Kingdom: Plantae
- Clade: Tracheophytes
- Clade: Angiosperms
- Clade: Magnoliids
- Order: Piperales
- Family: Piperaceae
- Genus: Peperomia
- Species: P. hirticaulis

Binomial name
- Peperomia hirticaulis C. DC.

= Peperomia hirticaulis =

Species of epiphyte

Peperomia hirticaulis is a species of epiphyte in the genus Peperomia that is native to Java. It grows on wet tropical biomes. Its conservation status is Threatened.

== Description ==
The type specimen were collected at Goenoeng Warmijin, Java.

Peperomia hirticaulis is an epiphytic plant with a hirsute stem, simple, terete, rooting at the base, with the terminal spike about 12 cm long, up to 1.5 mm thick. The leaves are opposite with very short glabrous petioles 1 mm long; the blade is elliptic-lanceolate, acute at both base and apex, up to 2 cm long and 4 cm wide. The peduncles are axillary and terminal, much exceeding the petioles, up to 13 mm long. The spikes are much longer than the leaves, up to 5 cm long and 2 mm thick, densely flowered, glabrous. The bract has an orbicular pelt, shortly pedicellate at the center, 0.5 mm in diameter. The ovary is glabrous, obovate, immersed in the rachis at the base, bearing a stigma at the very apex; the stigma is glabrous. The berry is subglobose, roughened with glands, nearly 1 mm in diameter.

== Taxonomy and naming ==
It was described in 1920 by Casimir de Candolle in the Annuaire du Conservatoire et du Jardin botaniques de Genève, from specimens collected by Henry Ogg Forbes. The epithet hirticaulis refers to the hairy stem.

== Distribution and habitat ==
It is native to Java. It grows as a epiphyte and is a herb. It grows on wet tropical biomes.

== Conservation ==
This species is assessed as Threatened, in a preliminary report.
