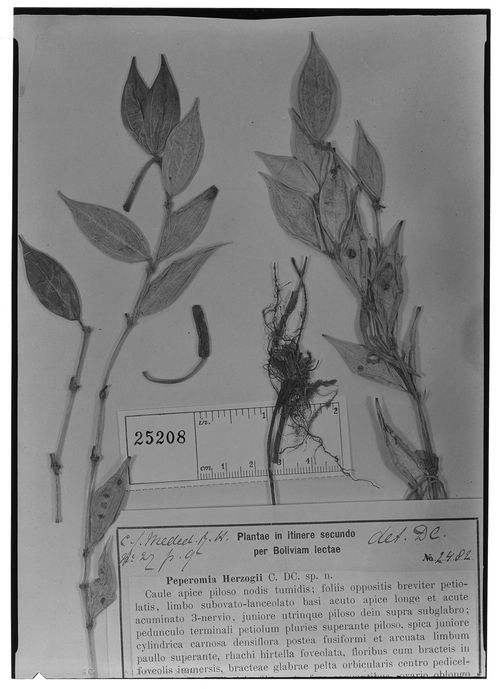

Scientific classification
- Kingdom: Plantae
- Clade: Tracheophytes
- Clade: Angiosperms
- Clade: Magnoliids
- Order: Piperales
- Family: Piperaceae
- Genus: Peperomia
- Species: P. hirtipeduncula

Binomial name
- Peperomia hirtipeduncula C. DC.

= Peperomia hirtipeduncula =

Species of epiphyte

Peperomia hirtipeduncula is a species of epiphyte in the genus Peperomia that is native to Ecuador. It grows on wet tropical biomes. Its conservation status is Threatened.

== Description ==
The type specimen were collected near Mount Pichincha, Ecuador.

Peperomia hirtipeduncula is densely hirsute everywhere except on the spikes. The stem is prostrate below, rooting at the nodes, erect above, hard when dry, 1 mm thick. The leaves are alternate with petioles nearly 1 cm long; the blade is elliptic-lanceolate, acute at both base and apex, measuring 3.5–4 cm long and 1.5–1.7 cm wide, firmly membranaceous when dry, 3-nerved, with black punctulations beneath. The peduncles are terminal and axillary, slightly exceeding the petioles. The spikes are filiform, glabrous, nearly three times longer than the leaf blade, up to 9 cm long and 0.75 mm thick, densely flowered. The bract has a round pelt with black punctulations, pedicellate very shortly at the center. The anthers are elliptic, exceeding the filament. The ovary is impressed into the rachis, ovate, obliquely acuminate at the apex and bearing a stigma below the apex; the stigma is minute and glabrous. The berry is globose, somewhat roughened with glutinous glands, sessile without a pseudocupula, scarcely 0.5 mm in diameter.

== Taxonomy and naming ==
It was described in 1920 by Casimir de Candolle in the Bulletin de la Société Royale de Botanique de Belgique, from specimens collected by Luis Sodiro. It got its epithet from the Latin hirtus and pedunculus, referring to the characteristic hairy flower stalk.

== Distribution and habitat ==
It is native to Ecuador. It grows on a epiphyte environment and is a herb. It grows on wet tropical biomes.

== Conservation ==
This species is assessed as Threatened, in a preliminary report.
