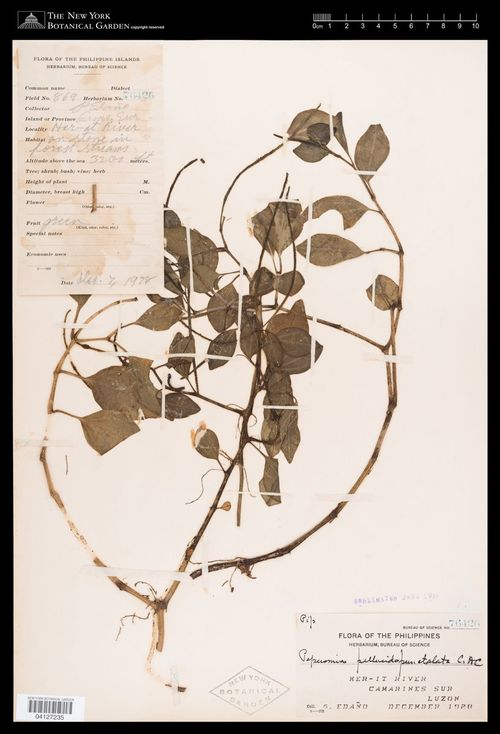

Scientific classification
- Kingdom: Plantae
- Clade: Tracheophytes
- Clade: Angiosperms
- Clade: Magnoliids
- Order: Piperales
- Family: Piperaceae
- Genus: Peperomia
- Species: P. pellucidopunctulata

Binomial name
- Peperomia pellucidopunctulata C.DC.

= Peperomia pellucidopunctulata =

Species of flowering plant

Peperomia pellucidopunctulata is a species of epiphyte in the genus Peperomia that is endemic in Philippines. It grows on wet tropical biomes. Its conservation status is Threatened.

== Description ==
The type specimen were collected near Dumaguete, Philippines.

Peperomia pellucidopunctulata has completely smooth, leaves that are moderately stalked, elliptic lance shaped with sharp bases and tips, five veined. Flower stalks are terminal, slightly longer than the leaf stalks. Spikes slightly exceed the leaf blade, rather densely flowered. The bract is circular with a stalk at the center. Anthers are small and elliptic. The ovary emerges above the flower, is top shaped, bears the stigma at the very tip. The stigma is spherical. The berry is nearly round with a shortly narrowed base.

Its stem root at the nodes below, branched. Branches appear erect, about 25 cm (9.8 in) long, 2.5 mm thick when dried. Leaves are alternate. Leaf blades are papery when dried, very densely covered with transparent dots, the upper ones up to 42 mm (1.7 in) long and 22 mm (0.87 in) wide. Leaf stalks are 9 mm long. Flower stalks are 12 mm long. Mature spikes are 5 cm (2.0 in) long and 1 mm thick. The central axis below the berry is eventually drawn out into a conical process. The berry is roughened with small glands and nearly 0.75 mm long.

== Taxonomy and naming ==
It was described in 1910 by Casimir de Candolle in Leaflets of Philippine Botany 3, from specimens collected by Adolph D. E. Elmer. It got its name description of the type specimen.

== Distribution and habitat ==
It is endemic in Philippines. It grows on a epiphyte environment and is a herb. It grows on wet tropical biomes.

== Conservation ==
This species is assessed as Threatened in a preliminary report.
