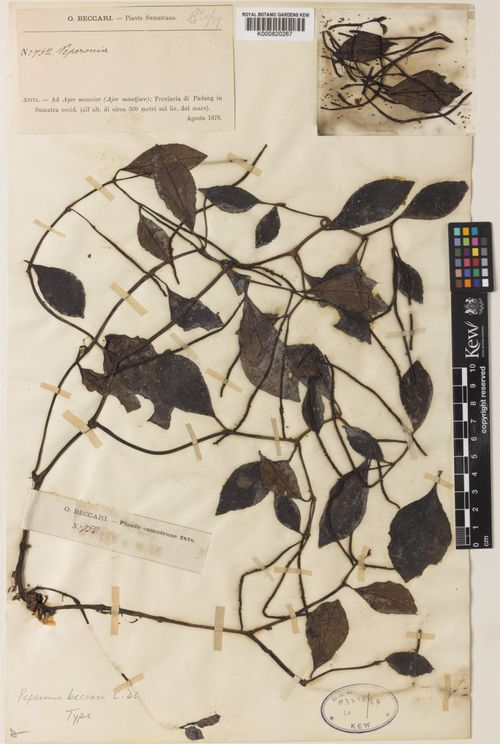

Scientific classification
- Kingdom: Plantae
- Clade: Tracheophytes
- Clade: Angiosperms
- Clade: Magnoliids
- Order: Piperales
- Family: Piperaceae
- Genus: Peperomia
- Species: P. beccarii

Binomial name
- Peperomia beccarii C. DC.

= Peperomia beccarii =

Species of flowering plant

Peperomia beccarii is a species of epiphyte in the genus Peperomia that is native to Sumatra. It grows on wet tropical biomes. Its conservation status is Threatened.

== Description ==
The type specimen were collected at Ayer Mantjoer, Sumatra, at an elevation of about 360 m.

Peperomia beccarii is entirely glabrous, with a stem that is decumbent at the base and rooting, terete when living, up to 2.5 mm thick. The leaves are alternate with short petioles 5 mm long; the blade is elliptic-lanceolate, acute at both base and apex, measuring 5.5 cm long and nearly 2.5 cm wide, rigidly membranaceous and opaque when dry, 5-plinerved, inconspicuously black-punctulate beneath especially at the base. The peduncles are axillary and terminal, unequal, much exceeding the petioles, measuring 10–25 mm long. The spikes are much longer than the leaves, up to 10 cm long and 2 mm thick, subdensely flowered, black when dry. The bract has an orbicular pelt, pedicellate at the center. The ovary is emergent, obovate, bearing a stigma obliquely just below the apex; the stigma is glabrous. The berry is ovate-globose, somewhat acute at the apex, roughened with glands, 1 mm long.

== Taxonomy and naming ==
It was described in 1920 by Casimir de Candolle in the Annuaire du Conservatoire et du Jardin botaniques de Genève, from specimens collected by Odoardo Beccari. It was named in honor of the Italian botanist Odoardo Beccari.

== Distribution and habitat ==
It is native to Sumatra. It grows as a terrestrial or epiphyte and is a herb. It grows on wet tropical biomes.

== Conservation ==
This species is assessed as Threatened, in a preliminary report.
