= Peperomia teysmannii =

Scientific classification
- Kingdom: Plantae
- Clade: Tracheophytes
- Clade: Angiosperms
- Clade: Magnoliids
- Order: Piperales
- Family: Piperaceae
- Genus: Peperomia
- Species: P. teysmannii

Binomial name
- Peperomia teysmannii C.DC.

Species of flowering plant

Peperomia ternata is a species of flowering plant from the genus Peperomia. It was first described by Casimir de Candolle and published in the book "Candollea 1: 327, in Clavi ". It primarily grows on wet tropical biomes. It is endemic to Indonesia. The species name came from Johannes Elias Teijsmann, who had expeditions in Indonesia.
