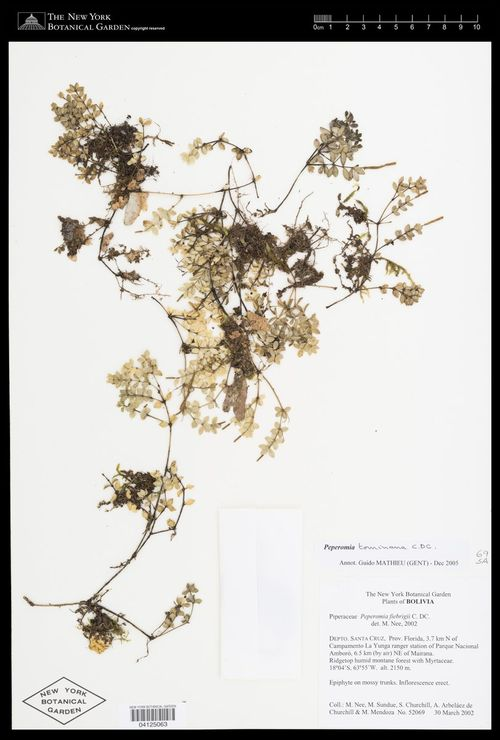

Scientific classification
- Kingdom: Plantae
- Clade: Tracheophytes
- Clade: Angiosperms
- Clade: Magnoliids
- Order: Piperales
- Family: Piperaceae
- Genus: Peperomia
- Species: P. tominana

Binomial name
- Peperomia tominana C.DC.

Synonyms
- Peperomia fiebrigii C.DC.; Peperomia fiebrigii f. glabrata Yunck.; Peperomia tominana f. pubifolia Yunck.

= Peperomia tominana =

Species of flowering plant

Peperomia tominana is a species of epiphyte or lithophyte in the genus Peperomia found in Argentina and Bolivia. It primarily grows on subtropical biomes. Its conservation status is Not Threatened.

== Description ==
The first specimens where collected in Bolivia.

Peperomia tominana has leaves that are tiny, mostly four-term, petiolate, elliptic at the base, and obtuse at the tip on both sides. It is ciliolate, glabrous at the apex, and nerves that are barely noticeable. Its terminal catkins are long-stalked, roughly twice as many as the leaves themselves, densely flowered, and filiform. The rhizomes are hairy, bracts are orbicular, ovary emergent is oblong and stigma is fleshy.

This herb grows from the base, developing hairy branches that are 4-5 cm long when dried, and has fleshy limbs that are 1 mm thick. When dry, the limbs appear leathery and slightly translucent, displaying a vein structure that is 6 mm in length. The petioles measure 1 mm The hairy peduncles are approximately 1 cm long, and the catkins are about 12 mm long.

Similar to it, P. reflexa differs in that it has emergent ovaries and considerably smaller leaves.

== Taxonomy and naming ==
It was described in 1898 by Casimir de Candolle in Bull. Torrey Bot. Club, from specimens collected by Weddell. It gets its name from the location where the specimens were first found.

== Subtaxa ==
Following subtaxa are accepted.

- Peperomia tominana f. pubifolia Yunck.

== Distribution and habitat ==
It is found in Argentina and Bolivia. It grows on epiphyte or lithophyte environment and is a herb. It grows on subtropical biomes.

== Conservation ==
This species is assessed as Not Threatened, in a preliminary report.
