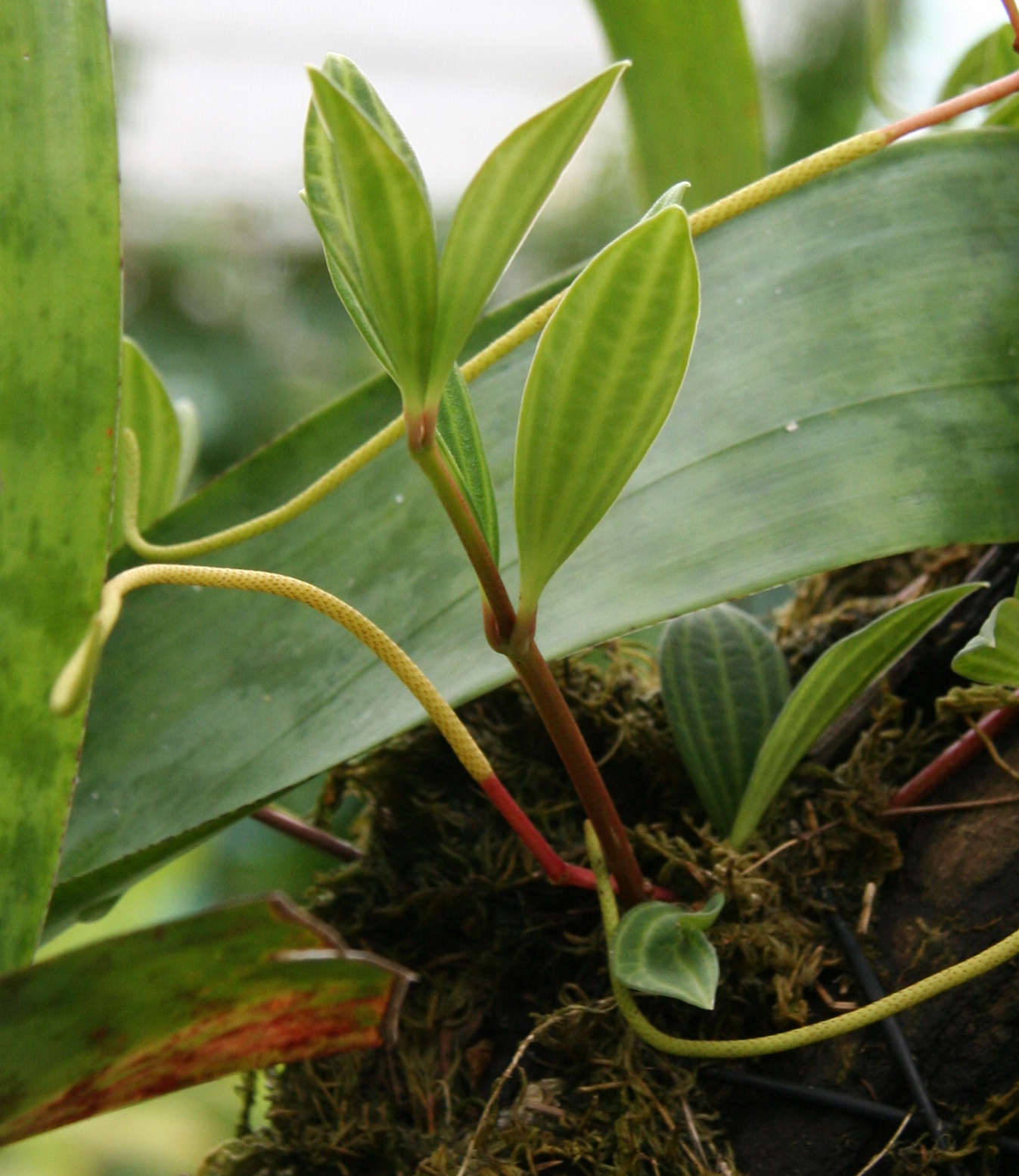

Scientific classification
- Kingdom: Plantae
- Clade: Tracheophytes
- Clade: Angiosperms
- Clade: Magnoliids
- Order: Piperales
- Family: Piperaceae
- Genus: Peperomia
- Species: P. cuspidilimba

Binomial name
- Peperomia cuspidilimba C. DC.

= Peperomia cuspidilimba =

Species of epiphyte

Peperomia cuspidilimba is a species of epiphyte in the genus Peperomia that is native to Ecuador. It grows on wet tropical biomes. Its conservation status is Threatened.

== Description ==
The type specimen were collected near the forests of Mount Tungurahua, Ecuador.

Peperomia cuspidilimba is entirely glabrous, with an erect, simple stem that is leathery and dark red when dry, up to 3 mm thick below. The leaves are ternate with rather long petioles 7–10 mm long; the blade is elliptic-lanceolate, acute at the base, long-cuspidate at the apex with a somewhat acute cusp, measuring 3.5–6 cm long and 1–2 cm wide, rigidly membranaceous when dry, densely pellucid-punctulate, 5-nerved. The peduncles are axillary at the apex of the stem and terminal, 2–3 cm long, exceeding the petioles. The spikes are twice as long as the leaf blade, up to 11.5 cm long and 2 mm thick, densely flowered. The bract is immersed with the flower, having an ovate pelt pedicellate at the center. The anthers are elliptic, exceeding the filament. The ovary is ovate, sprinkled with glands, bearing a stigma at the very apex; the stigma is fleshy and glabrous. The berry is ovate-acute, 0.75 mm long, without a pseudocupula.

== Taxonomy and naming ==
It was described in 1920 by Casimir de Candolle in the Annuaire du Conservatoire et du Jardin botaniques de Genève, from specimens collected by Luis Sodiro. The epithet cuspidilimba refers to the cuspidate leaf blade.

== Distribution and habitat ==
It is native to Ecuador. It grows as a terrestrial or epiphyte and is a herb. It grows on wet tropical biomes.

== Conservation ==
This species is assessed as Threatened, in a preliminary report.
