= Peperomia yungasana =

Scientific classification
- Kingdom: Plantae
- Clade: Embryophytes
- Clade: Tracheophytes
- Clade: Spermatophytes
- Clade: Angiosperms
- Clade: Magnoliids
- Order: Piperales
- Family: Piperaceae
- Genus: Peperomia
- Species: P. yungasana

Binomial name
- Peperomia yungasana C.DC.

Species of plant

Peperomia yungasana is a species of plant of the genus Peperomia, from Bolivia. It was described by Casimir de Candolle in 1914.
