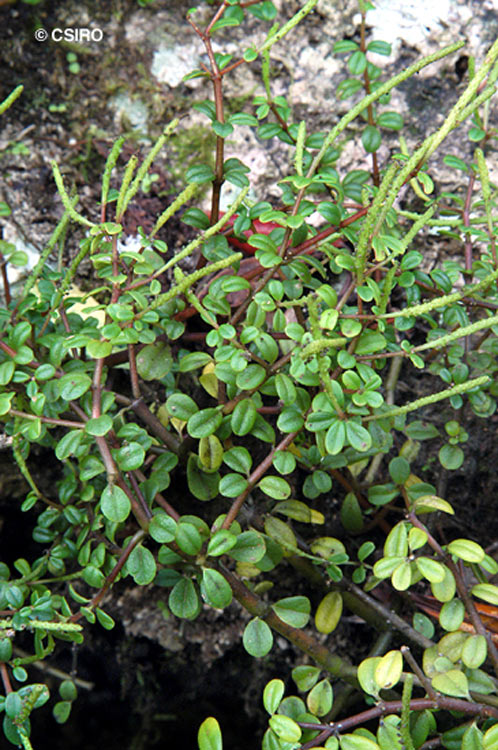

Conservation status
- Least Concern (NCA)

Scientific classification
- Kingdom: Plantae
- Clade: Tracheophytes
- Clade: Angiosperms
- Clade: Magnoliids
- Order: Piperales
- Family: Piperaceae
- Genus: Peperomia
- Species: P. enervis

Binomial name
- Peperomia enervis C.DC. & F.Muell.

Synonyms
- Peperomia johnsonii C.DC.

= Peperomia enervis =

Species of flowering plant

Peperomia enervis is a plant in the pepper family Piperaceae found only in rainforests of northeast Queensland near the cities of Cairns and Mackay. It was first described in 1891.

== Description ==
Peperomia enervis is a small succulent herb up to 30 cm (12 in) high. The stems are initially erect but after a time will lay down and produce roots from the nodes. The small glabrous leaves measure about 15 mm (0.59 in) long by 8 mm (0.31 in) wide, and are arranged either in opposite pairs or in whorls of three. They are carried on petioles about 1–4 mm (0.04–0.16 in) long, and the secondary venation is obscure.

The flowers are minute, measuring less than 1 mm (0.04 in) across, and are borne on terminal spikes about 5 cm (2.0 in) long. They are sunken into the axis of the inflorescence and lack both petals and sepals. The stigma is borne obliquely on the ovary and there are two stamens, one either side of the ovary. The fruit is, in botanical terms, a berry about 1 mm (0.04 in) diameter, dark brown in colour and containing a single seed.

=== Phenology ===
Flowering occurs between January and May, and fruits ripen from April to July.

== Taxonomy ==
This species was first described by the botanists Ferdinand von Mueller and Casimir de Candolle in a paper titled Descriptions of new Australian plants, with occasional other annotations, and published in the journal The Victorian Naturalist in 1891.

=== Etymology ===
The genus name Peperomia comes from the Ancient Greek words piperi "pepper", and homós "same", referring to its close relationship to the pepper genus Piper. The species epithet enervis means "without veins", a reference to the obscure venation of the leaves.

== Distribution and habitat ==
Peperomia enervis is found in two disjunct populations in Queensland - the larger one is within the Wet Tropics World Heritage Area near Cairns, and a smaller one in and around the Eungella National Park, west of Mackay. It grows on tree trunks and moss covered rocks in high altitude rainforest to about 1,200 m (3,900 ft).

== Conservation ==
This species is listed as least concern under the Queensland Government's Nature Conservation Act. As of 22 April 2024, it has not been assessed by the International Union for Conservation of Nature (IUCN).

== Gallery ==
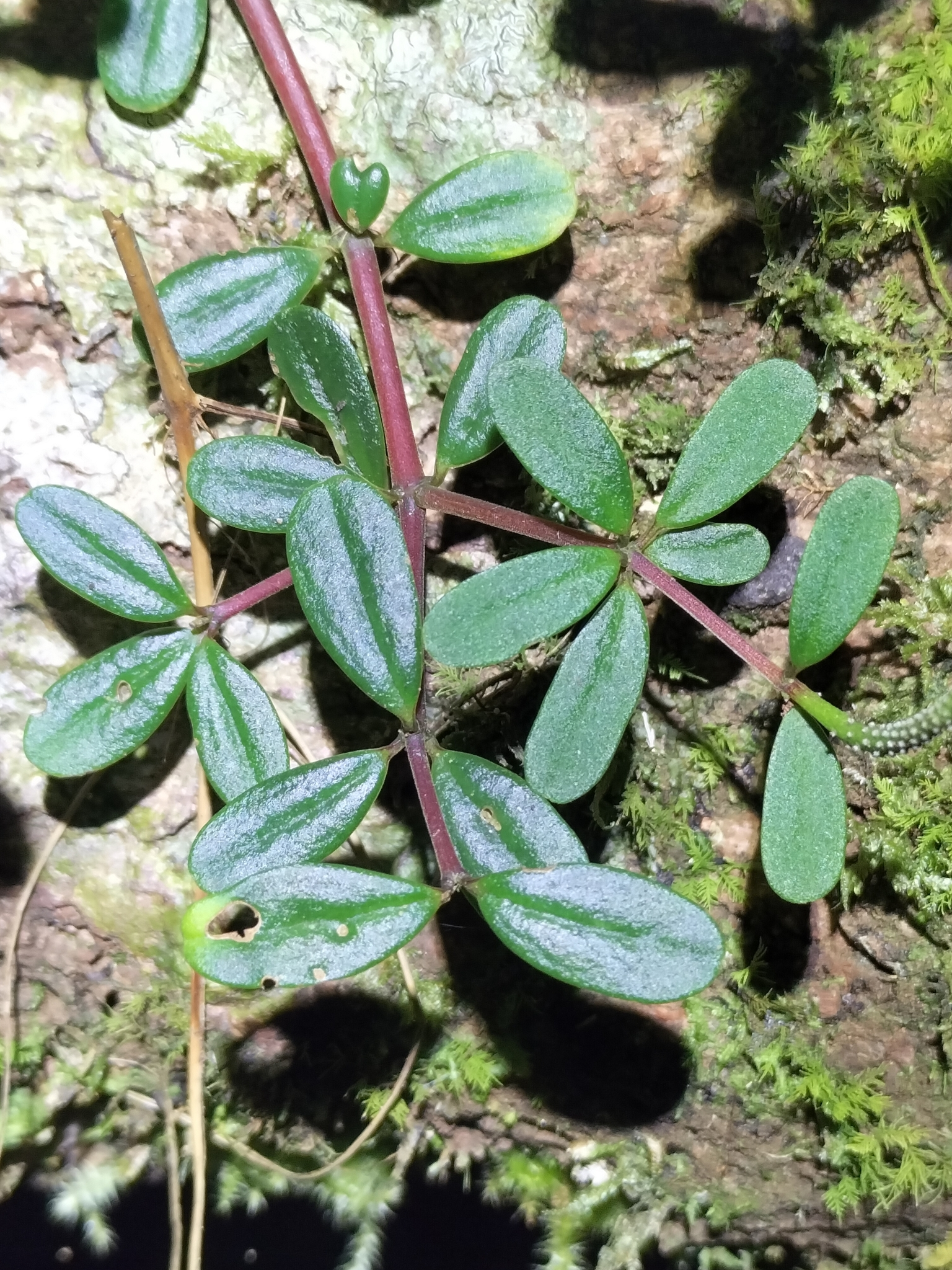

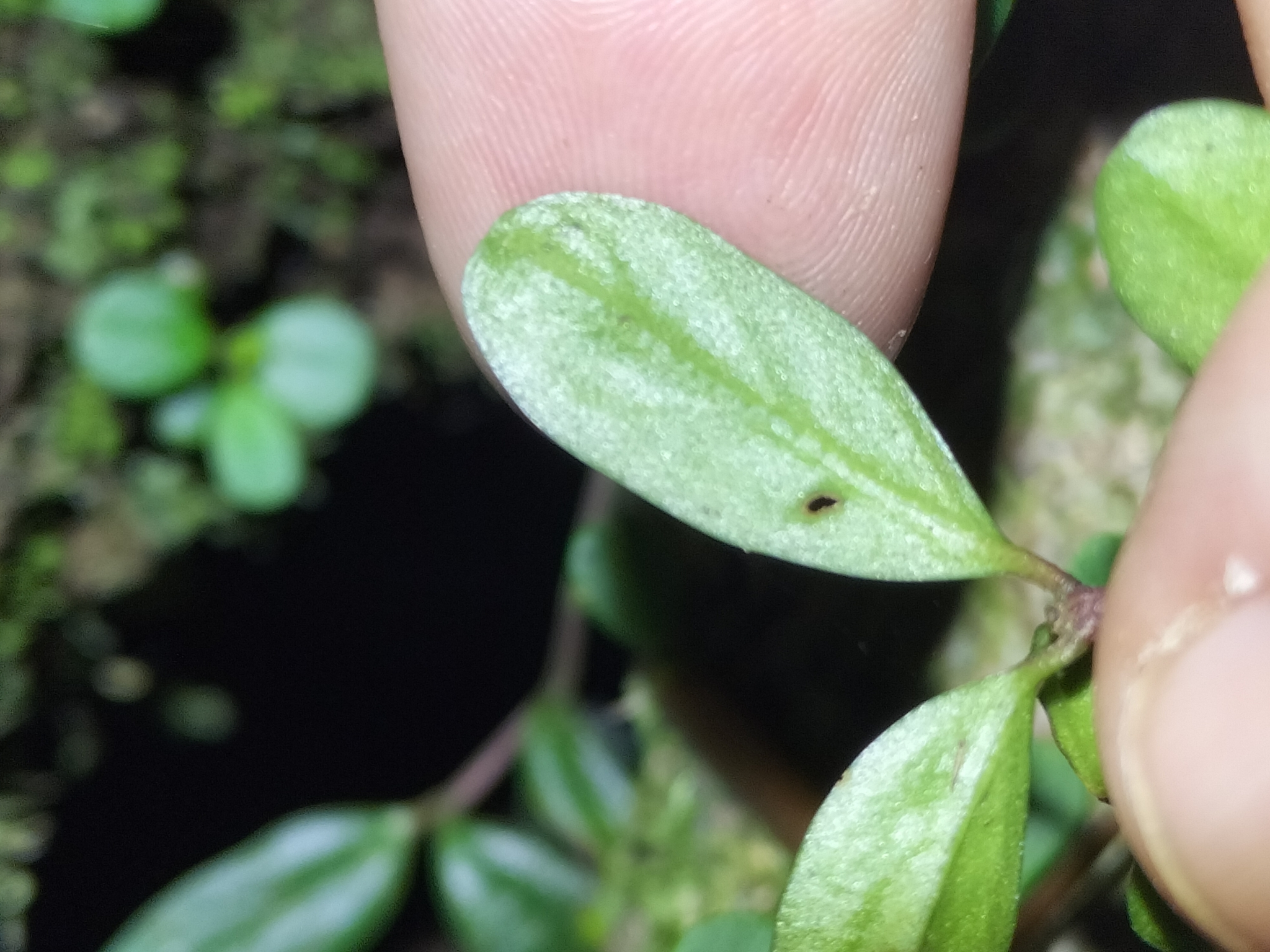

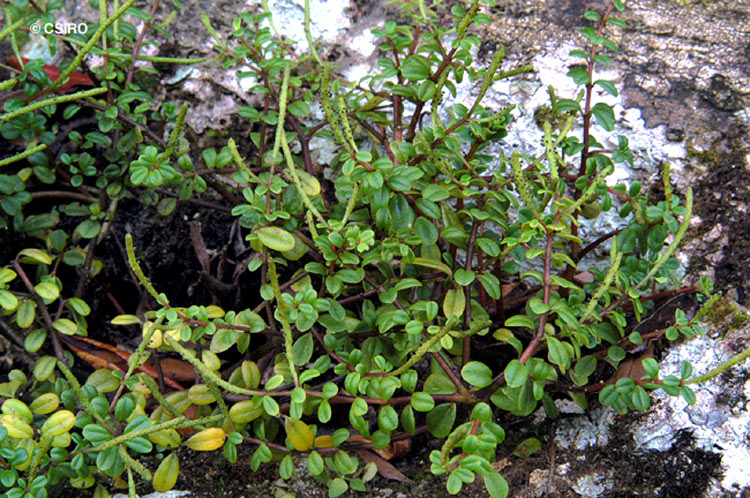

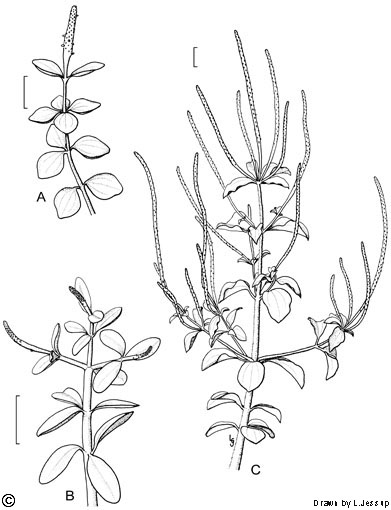

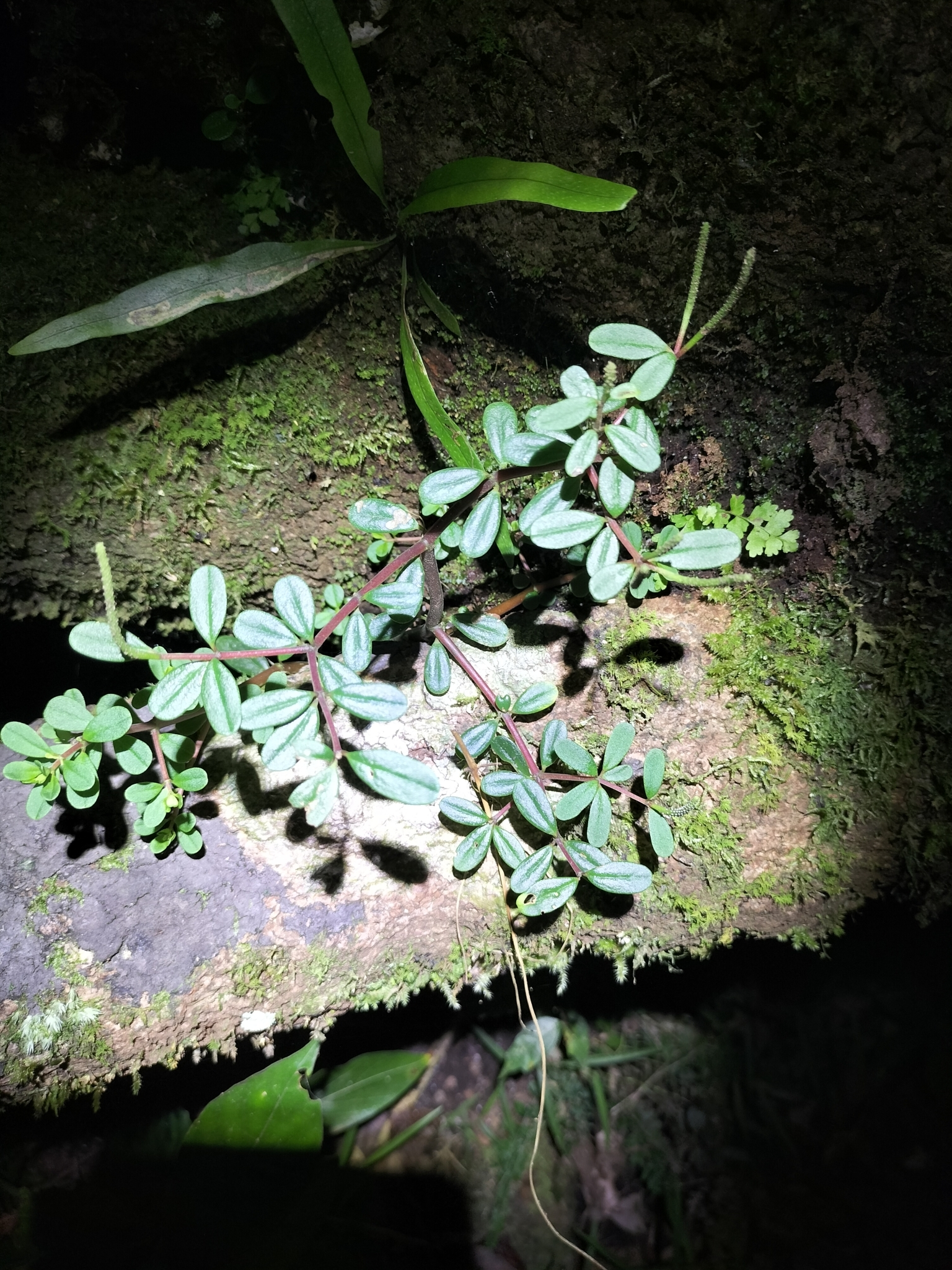
