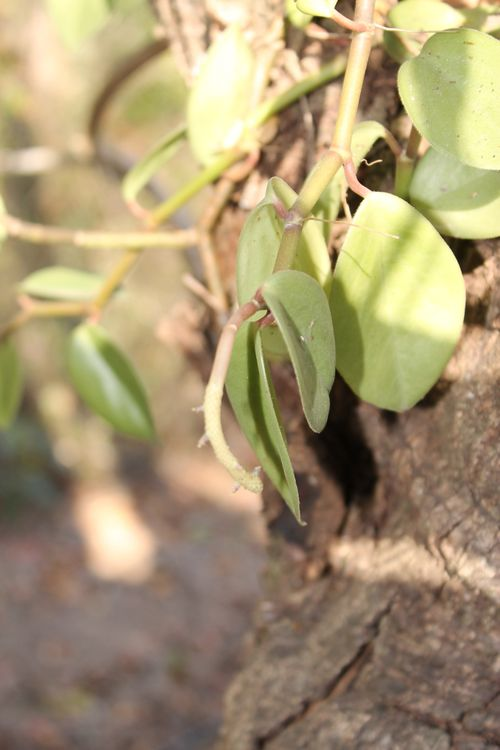

Scientific classification
- Kingdom: Plantae
- Clade: Tracheophytes
- Clade: Angiosperms
- Clade: Magnoliids
- Order: Piperales
- Family: Piperaceae
- Genus: Peperomia
- Species: P. tlapacoyoensis

Binomial name
- Peperomia tlapacoyoensis C.DC.

= Peperomia tlapacoyoensis =

Species of epiphyte

Peperomia tlapacoyoensis is a species of epiphyte in the genus Peperomia found in Veracruz. It primarily grows on wet tropical biomes. Its conservation status is Not Threatened.

== Description ==
The first specimens where collected on Tlapacoyo.

Peperomia tlapacoyoensis has long oval leaves with petioled tips that are acuminate; the base is rounded, opaque, leathery above and sparsely beneath; the central nerves protrude thickly beneath; there are two very fine nerves on either side that send loose spikes above the base; the petiole is hairy. The terminal leaves are somewhat larger than the leaves, and the petioles are equal to the peduncles, which are sporadically hairy. Orbicular bracts sub-sessile at the centre. At the centre of the stigmatic centrum, at the tip of the scutellum sursun pointed amata, a cylindrical pale berry openedly appeared.

Simple ceraceous stem with simple hairs that are 0.005 thick and very densely hairy. Limb length: 0.065; width: 0.035. Petiole length: 0.015 in. Berry length is 0.003 in.

== Taxonomy and naming ==
It was described in 1872 by Casimir de Candolle in Linnaea: Ein Journal für die Botanik in ihrem ganzen Umfange, from specimens collected by Frederik Liebmann in 1841. It gets its name from Tlapacoyo.

== Distribution and habitat ==
It is endemic to Vera Cruz. It grows on epiphyte environment and is a herb. It grows on wet tropical biomes.

== Conservation ==
This species is listed as Not Threatened under the Angiosperm Extinction Risk Predictions v1.
