= Peperomia wrayi =

Scientific classification
- Kingdom: Plantae
- Clade: Tracheophytes
- Clade: Angiosperms
- Clade: Magnoliids
- Order: Piperales
- Family: Piperaceae
- Genus: Peperomia
- Species: P. wrayi

Binomial name
- Peperomia wrayi C.DC

Species of plant

Peperomia wrayi is a species of plant from the genus Peperomia. It was discovered by Casimir de Candolle in the Malaya Peninsula.
