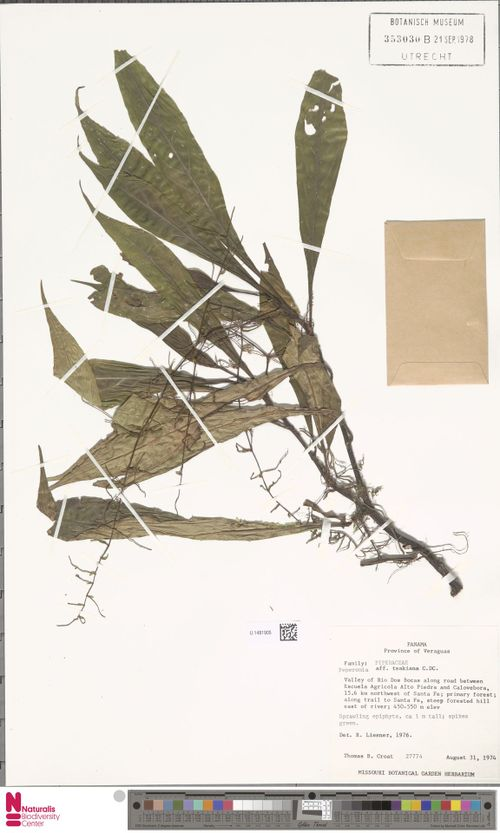

Scientific classification
- Kingdom: Plantae
- Clade: Tracheophytes
- Clade: Angiosperms
- Clade: Magnoliids
- Order: Piperales
- Family: Piperaceae
- Genus: Peperomia
- Species: P. tsakiana

Binomial name
- Peperomia tsakiana C.DC.

Synonyms
- Peperomia compotrix Trel.; Peperomia wedelii Yunck.

= Peperomia tsakiana =

Species of epiphyte subshrub

Peperomia trianae is a species of epiphyte subshrub in the genus Peperomia. It primarily grows on wet tropical biomes. Its Conservation Status is Not Threatened.

== Taxonomy and naming ==
It was described in 1899 by Casimir de Candolle in "Anales del Instituto Físico-Geográfico y del Museo Nacional de Costa Rica", from collected specimens by Henri François Pittier in 1895. It gets its name from Tsaki, where first specimens were collected.

== Subtaxa ==
Following subtaxa are accepted.

- Peperomia tsakiana var. victoriana C.DC. ex Trel.

== Distribution and habitat ==
It is endemic to Costa Rica and Panama. It grows on epiphyte environment and is a subshrub.
