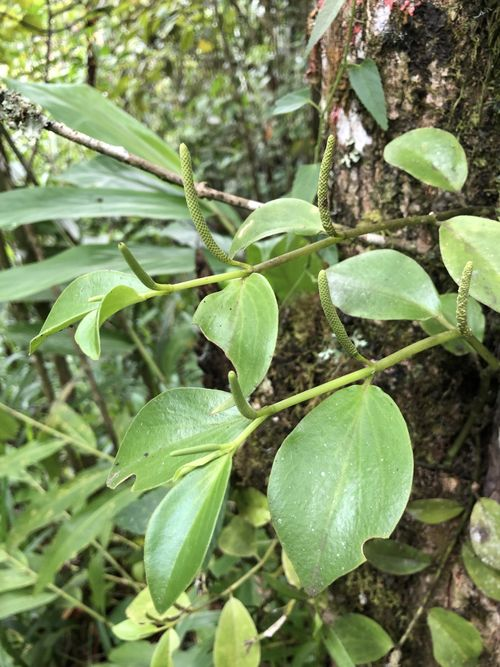

Scientific classification
- Kingdom: Plantae
- Clade: Tracheophytes
- Clade: Angiosperms
- Clade: Magnoliids
- Order: Piperales
- Family: Piperaceae
- Genus: Peperomia
- Species: P. trianae

Binomial name
- Peperomia trianae C.DC.

Synonyms
- Peperomia discistila C.DC.; Peperomia enantiostachya C.DC.; Peperomia flagrans Trel.; Peperomia imbracteata Yunck.

= Peperomia trianae =

Species of epiphyte

Peperomia trianae is a species of epiphyte in the genus Peperomia. It primarily grows on wet tropical biomes. Its conservation status is Not Threatened.

== Description ==
The first specimens where collected at 1500 metres elevation on Antioquia.

Change of leaves glabrous on both sides, juniors above and below the principal veins of a leaf, sparsely pubescent, dry, skin-like, sub-pellucid, 7-nerved, catkins opposite, isolated, leaves equal to densiflora, petiolate, subelliptic-lanceolate, apex acute, base subducting into the petiole, rachis foveolate, subglobose fruit, ovary submerged, oval, top flattened, stigmatiferous.

== Taxonomy and naming ==
It was described in 1866 by Casimir de Candolle in "Journal of Botany, British and Foreign.", from collected specimens by José Jerónimo Triana in 1852. It gets its name from José Jéronimo Triana.

== Distribution and habitat ==
It is endemic to South America, but primarily grows in Colombia. Its native distribution in Colombia is 1500-3000 metres in the Andes. It grows on epiphyte environment and is a herb.
