= Peperomia versteegii =

Scientific classification
- Kingdom: Plantae
- Clade: Tracheophytes
- Clade: Angiosperms
- Clade: Magnoliids
- Order: Piperales
- Family: Piperaceae
- Genus: Peperomia
- Species: P. versteegii

Binomial name
- Peperomia versteegii C.DC.

Species of plant

Peperomia versteegii is a species of plant belonging to the genus Peperomia. It grows in wet tropical biomes. It was discovered by Casimir de Candolle in 1910, in New Guinea.

== Etymology ==
versteegii came from the Dutch physician "Gerard Versteeg". Gerard Versteeg had expeditions in Dutch New Guinea.

== Distribution ==
Peperomia versteegii is endemic to New Guinea.
