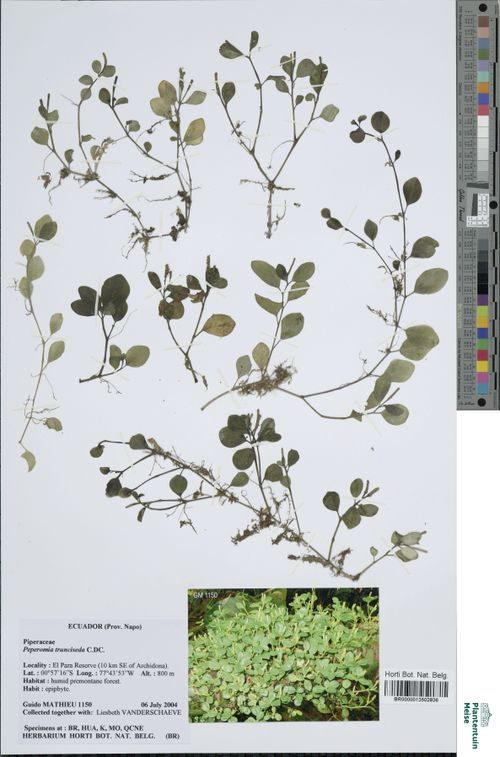

Scientific classification
- Kingdom: Plantae
- Clade: Tracheophytes
- Clade: Angiosperms
- Clade: Magnoliids
- Order: Piperales
- Family: Piperaceae
- Genus: Peperomia
- Species: P. trunciseda

Binomial name
- Peperomia trunciseda C.DC.

= Peperomia trunciseda =

Species of flowering plant

Peperomia trunciseda is a species of epiphyte in the genus Peperomia found in Colombia and Ecuador. Its conservation status is Threatened.

== Description ==
The first specimens where collected in Ecuador.

Peperomia trunciseda has leaves that are moderately petiolate, elliptical, acute at base, and obtuse at apex. It has a shallow board notch that is glabrous on both sides. It is 5-nerved, whose external nerves are often inconspicuous, with an end of the nerve running from the apex. The axillary and terminal axillary catkins are mature and sublaxiflorous. The bract is circle-like. The ovary has an obovate under apex bearing a small stigma. The berry is subimmersed, hairless, ovate, and obliquely rostellate at apex.

It is an epiphytic herb. The ramulose stem is a dry leathery that is about 2 mm thick. The younger branches are minutely pubescent and deglabrous. The sterile branchlets are rounded and fertile elliptic in dry membranous that is about 3 cm long and 2 cm wide. The petioles 1 cm long. Adult peduncles to 2 cm long.

== Taxonomy and Naming ==
It was described in 1898 by Casimir de Candolle in Bulletin de l'Herbier Boissier, from specimens collected by Luis Sodiro . It gets its name from the description of the species.

== Distribution and Habitat ==
It is found in Colombia and Ecuador.

== Conservation ==
This species is assessed as Threatened, in a preliminary report.
