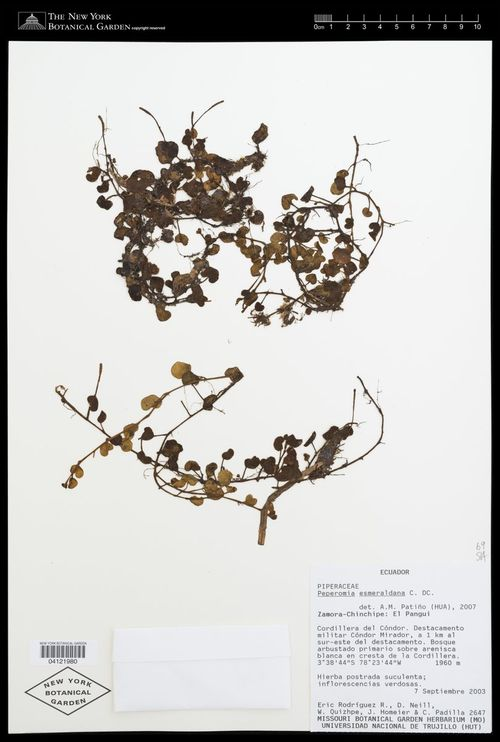

Scientific classification
- Kingdom: Plantae
- Clade: Tracheophytes
- Clade: Angiosperms
- Clade: Magnoliids
- Order: Piperales
- Family: Piperaceae
- Genus: Peperomia
- Species: P. esmeraldana

Binomial name
- Peperomia esmeraldana C. DC.

= Peperomia esmeraldana =

Species of epiphyte

Peperomia esmeraldana is a species of epiphyte in the genus Peperomia that is native to Ecuador. It grows on wet tropical biomes. Its conservation status is Threatened.

== Description ==
The type specimen were collected near the Cachabí River, Ecuador.

Peperomia esmeraldana is a creeping herb on old trees, with the stem sparsely puberulous, barely 1 mm thick. The leaves are alternate with glabrous petioles; the blade is reniform, ciliate, sprinkled with whitish glands on both sides, membranaceous when dry but fleshy when moist, up to 4 mm long and 7 mm wide, with inconspicuous nerves. The peduncles are mostly terminal, more rarely axillary, slightly exceeding the petioles. The spikes are glabrous, longer than the leaves, up to 7 mm long and nearly 1 mm thick, densely flowered. The bract has a round pelt, pedicellate at the center. The anthers are elliptic, exceeding the filament. The ovary is emergent, oblong, sprinkled with glands, shortly acuminate at the apex, bearing a stigma obliquely below the apex; the stigma is orbicular and glabrous.

== Taxonomy and naming ==
It was described in 1920 by Casimir de Candolle in the Annuaire du Conservatoire et du Jardin botaniques de Genève, from specimens collected by Luis Sodiro. It was named for Esmeraldas Province in Ecuador, where the type specimen was collected.

== Distribution and habitat ==
It is native to Ecuador. It grows as a epiphyte and is a herb. It grows on wet tropical biomes.

== Conservation ==
This species is assessed as Threatened, in a preliminary report.
