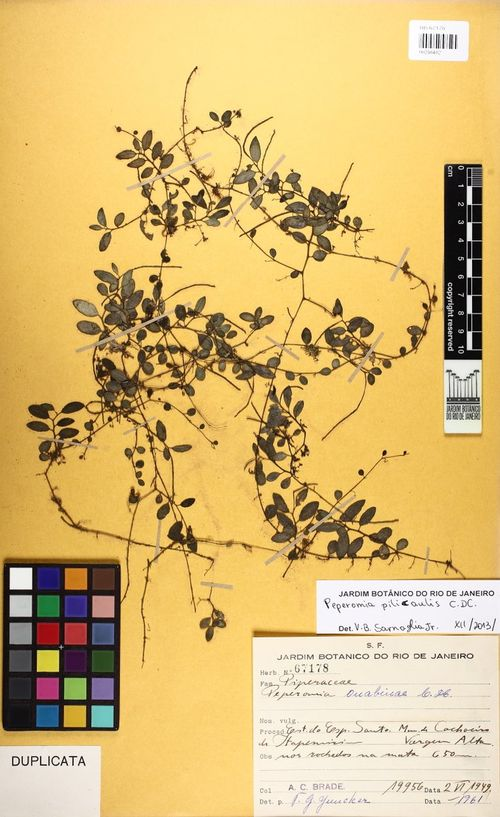

Scientific classification
- Kingdom: Plantae
- Clade: Tracheophytes
- Clade: Angiosperms
- Clade: Magnoliids
- Order: Piperales
- Family: Piperaceae
- Genus: Peperomia
- Species: P. pilicaulis

Binomial name
- Peperomia pilicaulis C. DC.

= Peperomia pilicaulis =

Species of epiphyte

Peperomia pilicaulis is a species of epiphyte in the genus Peperomia that is native to Ecuador. It grows on wet tropical biomes. Its conservation status is Threatened.

== Description ==
The type specimen were collected near Mount Tungurahua, Ecuador.

Peperomia pilicaulis has a stem and branches rather long-pilose, prostrate below and rooting at the nodes, 1 mm thick. The leaves are alternate with short petioles; the upper petioles 3 mm long; the blade is elliptic, acute at the base, obtuse at the apex, rigid and opaque when dry, shortly pilose above, glabrous beneath, 3-nerved; the upper leaves up to 17 mm long and 7 mm wide; subsequent leaves are elliptic, obtuse at both base and apex, 10 mm long and 7 mm wide; the lower leaves are round and smaller, all pilose on both sides. The peduncles are terminal, glabrous, 6 mm long, nearly twice the petioles. The spikes are glabrous, flowering spikes nearly four times longer than the leaf blade, 4 cm long and 1 mm thick. The bract has a round pelt, pedicellate at the center, slightly less than 0.5 mm in diameter. The anthers are rounded, nearly equaling the filament. The ovary is emergent, ovate, bearing a stigma below the obtuse apex; the stigma is fleshy and glabrous.

== Taxonomy and naming ==
It was described in 1920 by Casimir de Candolle in the Annuaire du Conservatoire et du Jardin botaniques de Genève, from specimens collected by Luis Sodiro. The epithet pilicaulis refers to the hairy stem.

== Distribution and habitat ==
It is native to Ecuador. It grows as a epiphyte and is a herb. It grows on wet tropical biomes.

== Conservation ==
This species is assessed as Threatened, in a preliminary report.
