= Peperomia variifolia =

Scientific classification
- Kingdom: Plantae
- Clade: Embryophytes
- Clade: Tracheophytes
- Clade: Spermatophytes
- Clade: Angiosperms
- Clade: Magnoliids
- Order: Piperales
- Family: Piperaceae
- Genus: Peperomia
- Species: P. variifolia

Binomial name
- Peperomia variifolia C.DC.

Species of epiphyte

Peperomia variifolia is a species of plant from the genus 'Peperomia'.

== Distribution ==
Peperomia variifolia is native to Peru.

- Peru

== Description ==
Leaves are generally very short-petiolate.
