= Peperomia gedehana =

Scientific classification
- Kingdom: Plantae
- Clade: Tracheophytes
- Clade: Angiosperms
- Clade: Magnoliids
- Order: Piperales
- Family: Piperaceae
- Genus: Peperomia
- Species: P. gedehana

Binomial name
- Peperomia gedehana C. DC.

Species of epiphyte

Peperomia gedehana is a species of epiphyte in the genus Peperomia that is native to Java. It grows on wet tropical biomes. Its conservation status is Threatened.

== Description ==
The type specimen were collected in the primeval forest of Mount Gedeh, on decaying wood and tree roots.

Peperomia gedehana has a glabrous stem that roots below, nearly 2 mm thick, leathery when dry, branched above with branchlets nearly 1 mm thick. The leaves are alternate with short glabrous petioles up to 3 mm long; the blade is ovate-lanceolate, acute at the base, subacute at the apex, somewhat rigid when dry, up to 2 cm long and 7 mm wide, 3-nerved. The peduncles are glabrous, axillary, equaling the petioles. The spikes nearly equal or slightly exceed the leaf blades, 1.5–2.8 cm long and 1 mm thick when bearing fruit. The bract has a pelt nearly 0.35 mm in diameter. The ovary is obovate, bearing a stigma just below the apex; the stigma is glabrous. The berry is ovate, sprinkled with whitish glands, slightly over 0.5 mm long, brownish when dry.

== Taxonomy and naming ==
It was described in 1920 by Casimir de Candolle in the Annuaire du Conservatoire et du Jardin botaniques de Genève, from specimens collected by Hugo Dihm. It was named for Mount Gedeh in Java, where the type specimen was collected.

== Distribution and habitat ==
It is native to Java. It grows as a epiphyte and is a herb. It grows on wet tropical biomes.

== Conservation ==
This species is assessed as Threatened, in a preliminary report.
