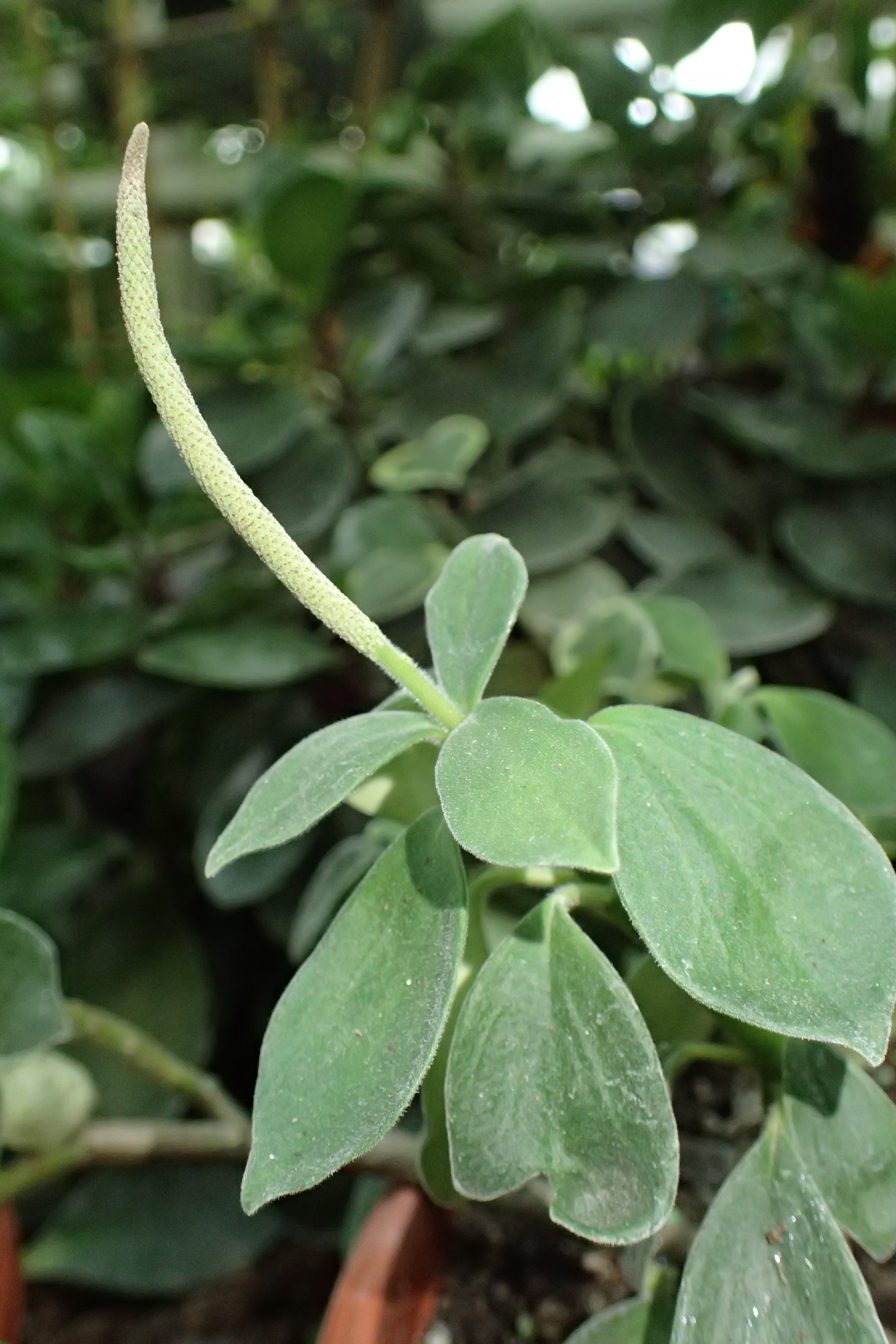

Scientific classification
- Kingdom: Plantae
- Clade: Tracheophytes
- Clade: Angiosperms
- Clade: Magnoliids
- Order: Piperales
- Family: Piperaceae
- Genus: Peperomia
- Species: P. hirta

Binomial name
- Peperomia hirta C.DC.

= Peperomia hirta =

Species of plant

Peperomia hirta is a species of plant in the genus Peperomia. Its native range is in Central America from Mexico to Panama.
