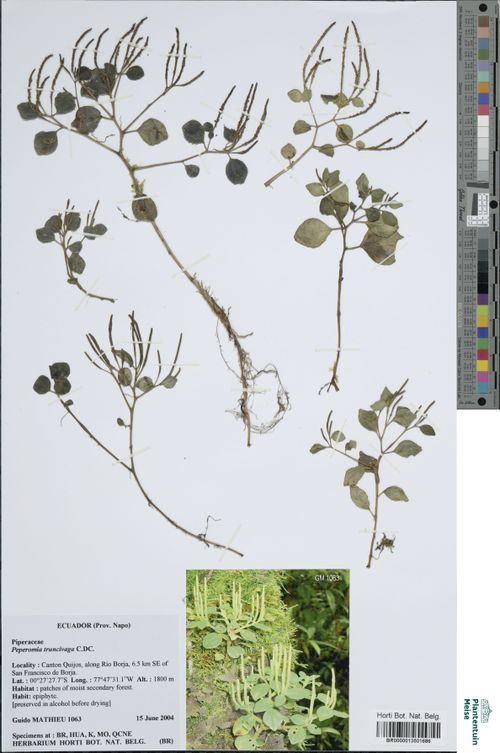

Scientific classification
- Kingdom: Plantae
- Clade: Tracheophytes
- Clade: Angiosperms
- Clade: Magnoliids
- Order: Piperales
- Family: Piperaceae
- Genus: Peperomia
- Species: P. truncivaga

Binomial name
- Peperomia truncivaga C.DC.

= Peperomia truncivaga =

Species of flowering plant

Peperomia truncivaga is a species of epiphyte in the genus Peperomia found in Colombia and Ecuador. It primarily grows on wet tropical biomes. Its conservation status is Not Threatened.

== Description ==
The first specimens where collected in Ecuador.

The branches are adpressed and hairy at the nodes, and when dried, they measure barely 1/2 mm in thickness. The limbs, when dried, appear membranous and subopaque below, with an inconspicuous dark-punctate texture, measuring up to 2 1/2 cm in length and 11 mm in width. The petioles are 1 cm long, and the anthers have a minutely rounded shape.

== Taxonomy and naming ==
It was described in 1898 by Casimir de Candolle in Bulletin de l'Herbier Boissier, from specimens collected by Luis Sodiro. It gets its name from the location where the specimens were.

== Distribution and habitat ==
It is found in Colombia and Ecuador. It grows on epiphyte environment and is a herb. In Colombia, its elevation range is 1500 - 2000 meters. It grows on wet tropical biomes.

== Conservation ==
This species is assessed as Not Threatened, in a preliminary report.
