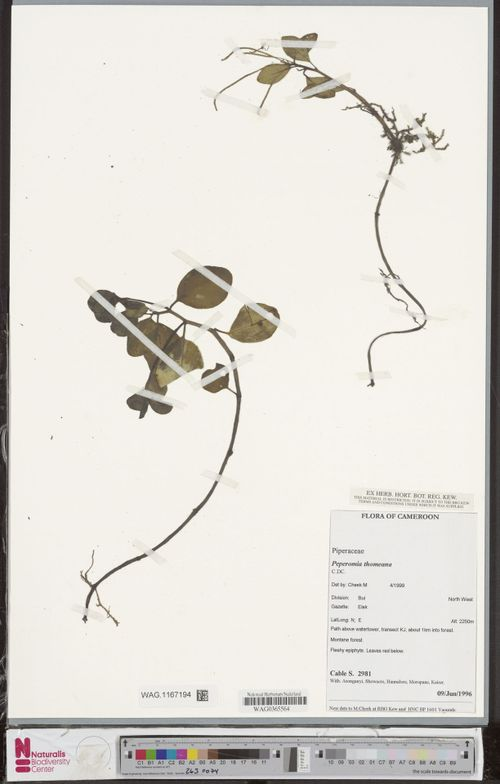

Scientific classification
- Kingdom: Plantae
- Clade: Tracheophytes
- Clade: Angiosperms
- Clade: Magnoliids
- Order: Piperales
- Family: Piperaceae
- Genus: Peperomia
- Species: P. thollonii

Binomial name
- Peperomia thollonii C.DC.

= Peperomia thollonii =

Species of flowering plant

Peperomia thollonii is a species of flowering plant from the genus Peperomia. It was first described by Casimir de Candolle and published in the book "Notulae Systematicae. Herbier du Museum de Paris 3: 38. 1914 ". It primarily grows on wet tropical biomes. Its etymology came from François-Romain Thollon, a botanist and plant collector who worked in Gabon and the Congo.

== Distribution ==
It is endemic to Cameroon, Gabon and Republic of the Congo. First specimens where found Gabon.

- Cameroon
  - North-West Region
- Gabon
  - Tchimbélé River
  - Forêt du Mayumbe
- Republic of the Congo

== Description ==
The stalk is thickly hairy, featuring alternating leaves that are somewhat petiolate and glabrous; the limbs are elliptic-lanceolate at the base and have an acute 3-nerved tip; the axillary and terminal peduncles are almost as long as the petioles; the filiform spikes are almost as long as the limbs; the bracts are pelt obovate, situated slightly above the middle of the subsessile; the ovary emerges ovate at the top, with a stigmatiferous tip that is fleshy and glabrous; the berry is globose-ovate at the tip, with mucronulate stigma and asperulate glands.

stems that rise 1 mm, or around 13 cm, thick, from a prostrate base. extended Legs in dry membranous minute transparent-punctate, petiole measuring 9 mm in length and up to 3 cm in length and 1.8 cm in width. Approximately 0.75 mm thick berry spikes and 0.5 mm diameter plate fur.
