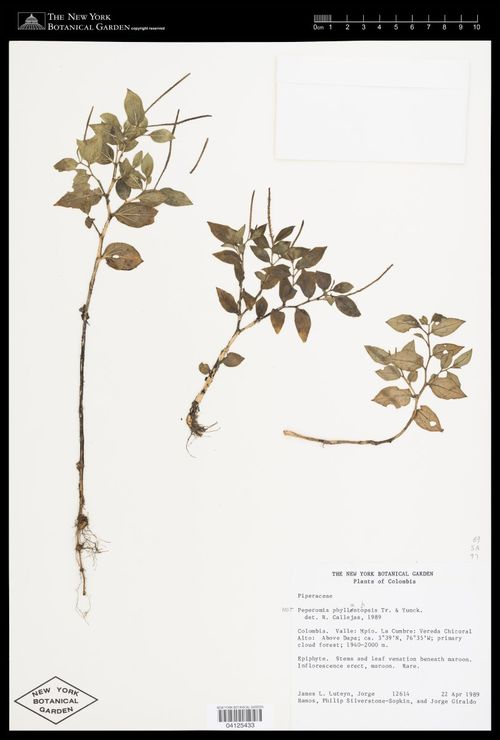

Scientific classification
- Kingdom: Plantae
- Clade: Tracheophytes
- Clade: Angiosperms
- Clade: Magnoliids
- Order: Piperales
- Family: Piperaceae
- Genus: Peperomia
- Species: P. cachabiana

Binomial name
- Peperomia cachabiana C. DC.

= Peperomia cachabiana =

Species of flowering plant

Peperomia cachabiana is a species of epiphyte in the genus Peperomia that is native to Ecuador. It grows on wet tropical biomes. Its conservation status is Threatened.

== Description ==
The type specimen were collected near the Cachabí River in Esmeraldas, Ecuador.

Peperomia cachabiana is entirely glabrous, with an erect stem that is hard when dry, measuring 1 mm thick. The leaves are alternate with very short petioles 2 mm long; the blade is elliptic-oblong, acute at both base and apex, measuring 4–5 cm long and 2 cm wide, membranaceous when dry and densely pellucid-punctate, with a central nerve emitting 5–6 ascending thin nerves. The peduncle is terminal, 25 mm long, several times longer than the petiole. The spike is slightly longer than the leaf blade, 5 cm long and 1 mm thick, densely flowered. The bract has an obovate pelt, pedicellate almost at the center. The anthers are rounded, nearly equaling the filament. The ovary is emergent, oblong, filled with glands, bearing a rounded stigma at the very apex.

== Taxonomy and naming ==
It was described in 1890 by Casimir de Candolle in the Bulletin de la Société Royale de Botanique de Belgique, from specimens collected by Luis Sodiro. It was named for the locality in Ecuador where it was first collected, the Cachabí River.

== Distribution and habitat ==
It is native to Ecuador. It grows as a terrestrial or epiphyte and is a herb. It grows on wet tropical biomes.

== Conservation ==
This species is assessed as Threatened, in a preliminary report.
