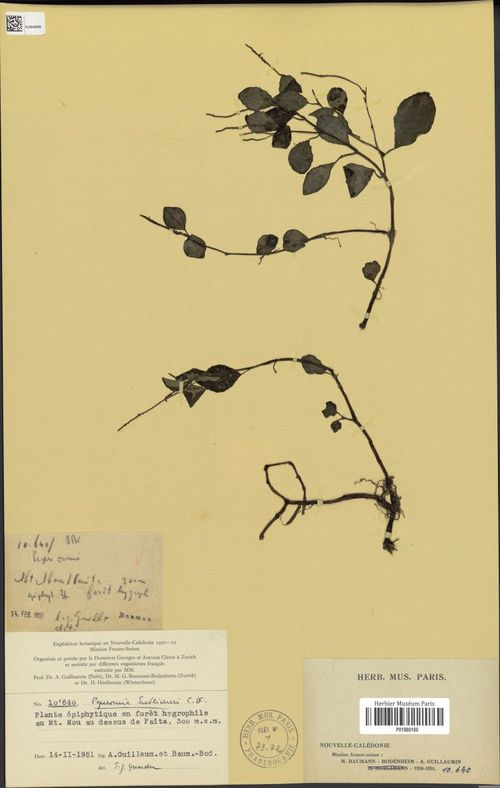

Scientific classification
- Kingdom: Plantae
- Clade: Tracheophytes
- Clade: Angiosperms
- Clade: Magnoliids
- Order: Piperales
- Family: Piperaceae
- Genus: Peperomia
- Species: P. endlichii

Binomial name
- Peperomia endlichii C. DC.

= Peperomia endlichii =

Species of epiphyte

Peperomia endlichii is a species of epiphyte in the genus Peperomia that is native to Mexico. It grows on wet tropical biomes. Its conservation status is Threatened.

== Description ==
The type specimen were collected at Jalapa, Mexico, at an elevation of about 1410 m, growing on walls and trees.

Peperomia endlichii is entirely glabrous, with a stem that roots at the nodes below, leathery and pellucid when dry, up to 2.5 mm thick. The leaves are alternate with moderate petioles 5–6 mm long; the blade is ovate-lanceolate, acute at the base, shortly and obtusely acuminate at the apex, membranaceous when dry, pellucid-punctulate, up to 3 cm long and 1.5 cm wide, 5-nerved. The peduncles are axillary and terminal, nearly equaling the petioles. The spikes exceed the leaves, up to 4.5 cm long and 2 mm thick, densely flowered. The bract is immersed with the flower into the rachis, having an orbicular pelt pedicellate at the center. The anthers are minute, elliptic, nearly equaling the filament. The ovary is ovate, bearing a stigma obliquely just below the apex; the stigma is minute and glabrous. The berry is ovate-globose, obliquely rostellate at the apex, slightly over 0.5 mm long.

== Taxonomy and naming ==
It was described in 1920 by Casimir de Candolle in the Annuaire du Conservatoire et du Jardin botaniques de Genève, from specimens collected by Rudolf Endlich. It was named in honor of the collector Rudolf Endlich.

== Distribution and habitat ==
It is native to Mexico. It grows as a terrestrial or epiphyte and is a herb. It grows on wet tropical biomes.

== Conservation ==
This species is assessed as Threatened, in a preliminary report.
