= Peperomia hallieri =

Scientific classification
- Kingdom: Plantae
- Clade: Tracheophytes
- Clade: Angiosperms
- Clade: Magnoliids
- Order: Piperales
- Family: Piperaceae
- Genus: Peperomia
- Species: P. hallieri

Binomial name
- Peperomia hallieri C. DC.

Synonyms
- Peperomia candida Koord.

Species of flowering plant

Peperomia hallieri is a species of epiphyte in the genus Peperomia that is native to Java. It grows on wet tropical biomes. Its conservation status is Threatened.

== Description ==
The type specimen were collected on Mount Gedeh, Java.

Peperomia hallieri is a creeping herb among mosses, with a glabrous stem up to 1 mm thick when dry; the flowering branches with spikes are about 4 cm long. The leaves are alternate with moderate glabrous petioles nearly 4 mm long; the blade is elliptic, acute at the base, obtuse at the apex, rigid when dry, fleshy when living, shiny and dark green above, up to 2 cm long and 1.5 cm wide, 3-nerved. The peduncles are glabrous, 7 mm long, much longer than the petioles. The spikes are terminal, nearly equaling the leaves, filiform, densely flowered, glabrous. The bract has a round pelt, shortly pedicellate at the center, 0.5 mm in diameter. The ovary is emergent, ovate, bearing a stigma at the very apex; the stigma is somewhat pilose. The berry is sub-obovate-globose, smooth, straightly mucronulate at the apex, 0.75 mm long.

== Taxonomy and naming ==
It was described in 1920 by Casimir de Candolle in the Annuaire du Conservatoire et du Jardin botaniques de Genève, from specimens collected by Johannes Gottfried Hallier. It was named in honor of the collector Hallier. The synonym Peperomia candida Koord. was published earlier in Tip. van Java p. 64 p.p.

== Distribution and habitat ==
It is native to Java. It grows as a epiphyte and is a herb. It grows on wet tropical biomes.

== Conservation ==
This species is assessed as Threatened, in a preliminary report.
