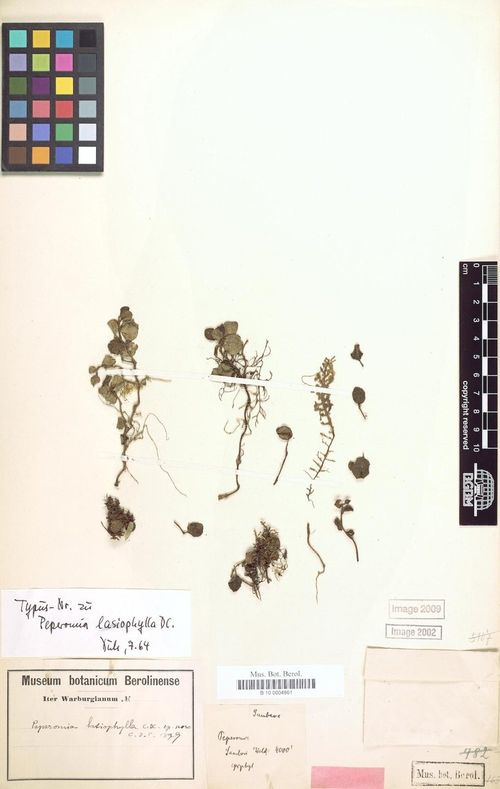

Scientific classification
- Kingdom: Plantae
- Clade: Tracheophytes
- Clade: Angiosperms
- Clade: Magnoliids
- Order: Piperales
- Family: Piperaceae
- Genus: Peperomia
- Species: P. lasiophylla

Binomial name
- Peperomia lasiophylla C. DC.

= Peperomia lasiophylla =

Species of epiphyte

Peperomia lasiophylla is a species of epiphyte in the genus Peperomia that is native to Sumbawa. It grows on wet tropical biomes. Its conservation status is Threatened.

== Description ==
The type specimen were collected near Sumbawa at an elevation of 4000 ft.

Peperomia lasiophylla is an epiphytic plant with branchlets rather long-pilose, nearly 4 cm long and 1 mm thick. The leaves are alternate with short petioles nearly 2 mm long, pilose; the blade is elliptic-rounded, rigid and somewhat opaque when dry, about 15 mm long and 13 mm wide, 3-nerved, pilose on both sides and dark-punctulate. The peduncles are pilose, slightly exceeding the petioles. The spikes are glabrous, slightly shorter than the leaf blade. The bract has an orbicular pelt, subsessile at the center. The anthers are elliptic, exceeding the very short filament. The ovary is immersed, bearing a stigma obliquely just below the apex; the stigma is minute and glabrous. The berry is globose, immersed at the base, obtusely apiculate at the apex, nearly 0.5 mm long, sprinkled with glands.

== Taxonomy and naming ==
It was described in 1920 by Casimir de Candolle in the Annuaire du Conservatoire et du Jardin botaniques de Genève, from specimens collected by Otto Warburg. The epithet lasiophylla comes from the Greek lasios and phyllon, referring to the hairy leaves.

== Distribution and habitat ==
It is native to Sumbawa. It grows as a epiphyte and is a herb. It grows on wet tropical biomes.

== Conservation ==
This species is assessed as Threatened, in a preliminary report.
