= Peperomia carnicaulis =

Scientific classification
- Kingdom: Plantae
- Clade: Tracheophytes
- Clade: Angiosperms
- Clade: Magnoliids
- Order: Piperales
- Family: Piperaceae
- Genus: Peperomia
- Species: P. carnicaulis

Binomial name
- Peperomia carnicaulis C. DC.

Species of flowering plant

Peperomia carnicaulis is a species of epiphyte in the genus Peperomia that is native to Celebes. It grows on wet tropical biomes. Its conservation status is Threatened.

== Description ==
The type specimen were collected at Fjamba, Celebes.

Peperomia carnicaulis is glabrous, creeping, with stems rooting at the nodes, leathery when dry, up to 3 mm thick; the flowering branches are erect. The leaves are alternate with moderate petioles 5 mm long; the blade is elliptic-lanceolate, acute at both ends, membranaceous when dry, up to 3.5 cm long and 2 cm wide, 5-nerved. The peduncles are axillary and terminal, nearly equaling the petioles. The spikes are slightly longer than the leaves, up to 4 cm long and 0.75 mm thick when dry, densely flowered. The bract has an orbicular pelt, shortly pedicellate at the center. The ovary is emergent, oblong-obovate, with an inconspicuous stigma.

== Taxonomy and naming ==
It was described in 1920 by Casimir de Candolle in the Annuaire du Conservatoire et du Jardin botaniques de Genève, from specimens collected by Johannes Elias Teijsmann. The epithet carnicaulis refers to the fleshy stem.

== Distribution and habitat ==
It is native to Celebes. It grows as a terrestrial or epiphyte and is a herb. It grows on wet tropical biomes.

== Conservation ==
This species is assessed as Threatened, in a preliminary report.
