= Richard Émile Augustin de Candolle =

Swiss botanist (1868–1920)

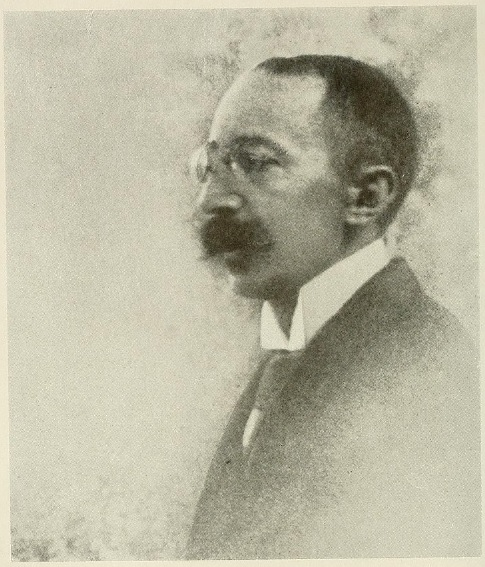
- Born: 8 December 1868; Walton-on-Thames
- Died: 4 May 1920 (aged 51); Vallon, Broye District
- Known for: plant systematics
- Spouse: Louise de Saugy
- Scientific career
- Fields: botany
- Author abbrev. (botany): Aug.DC.

Richard Émile Augustin de Candolle (8 December 1868, Walton-on-Thames – 4 May 1920, Vallon) was a Swiss botanist and was British consul to the Canton of Geneva between 1912 and 1918.

== Early life and education ==
Richard Émile Augustin de Candolle was the grandson of Alphonse Pyramus de Candolle, and son of Casimir de Candolle and Anna-Mathilde Marcet, granddaughter of William Marcet. He had three siblings: Raymond Charles de Candolle 1864–1935, Florence Pauline Lucienne de Candolle 1865–1943 and Reyne Marguerite de Candolle 1876–1958.

Having initially studied in Geneva, he was sent to England because of the maternal family connections and, in 1883, was sent to Rugby School where he remained until 1887. He then spent time in Frankfurt to improve his German before returning to London to study for the Civil Service, with the intention of entering the Diplomatic Service. However, he was obliged to abandon that ambition and, instead, studied for a career in law in Leipzig and Heidelberg from 1890 to 1893. Despite this he was always oriented towards botany, and, returning to Geneva, he vowed to continue the botanical family dynasty.

He married Louise de Saugy in 1895, and they had three daughters and two sons.

== Career ==
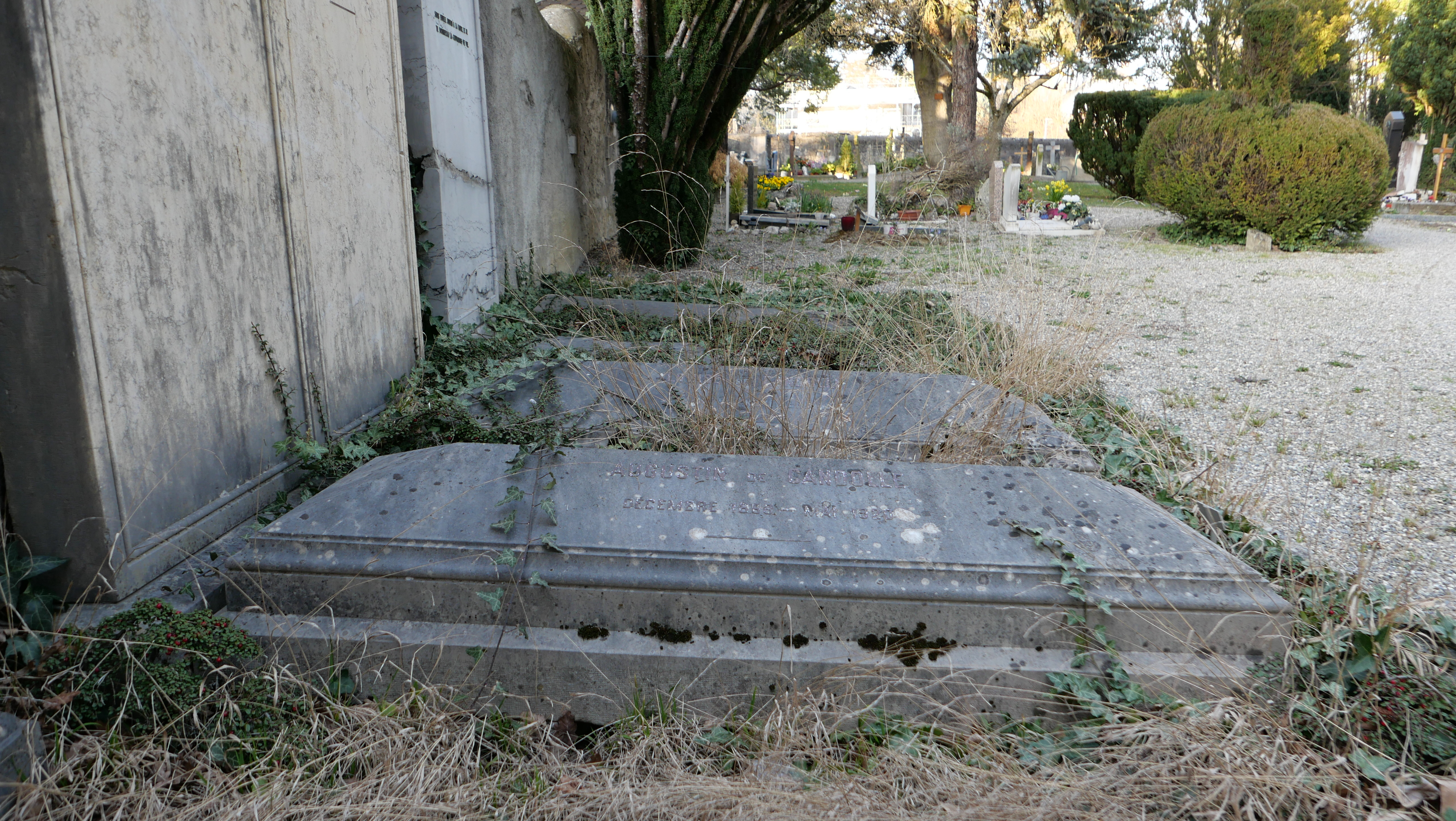
De Candolle's grave at the cemetery of Chêne-Bougeries

Not having particularly prepared for a career in botany, he was mentored by his father. He made a study of the east Madagascan collection of Emile Mocquerys, publishing several descriptions of new species in conjunction with colleagues. In 1912 he was called to work for the British consulate, a role for which his formal education had prepared him well. The demands of this, particularly during the four years of World War I, inevitably reduced his botanical studies.

The death of his father in 1918, and the end of war prompted him to resign from the consulate and he was set to continue his botanic career with renewed vigour. His death, at the age of 51, was unexpected. After his death, the de Candolle herbarium collection comprising 400,000 specimens and substantial library of 14,000 works, (which included a copy of the 1485, Herbarius latinus, the earliest illustrated work known, along with other pre-Linnean works) was donated to the city of Geneva.

== Awards, honours and affiliations ==
Member of:

- Swiss Society of Natural Sciences
- Botanical Society of Geneva, president 1903–1907
- Botanical Society of Switzerland
- Geneva Society of Physical and Natural History, of which he was first treasurer, then president in 1914
