= Raymond de Candolle =

British railway engineer (1864–1935)

Major-General Raymond de Candolle CB
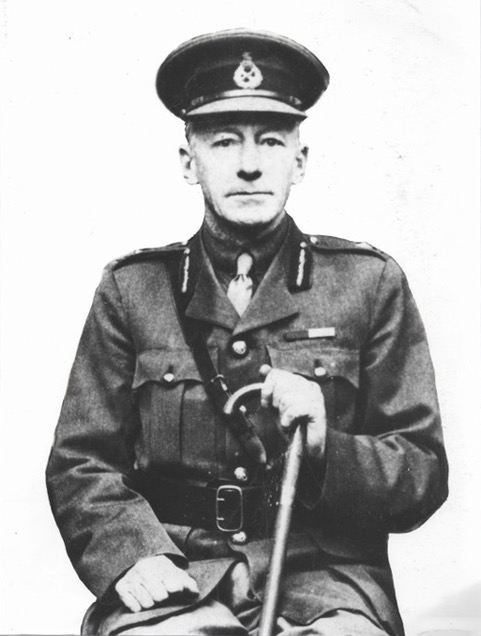
- Major-General Raymond de Candolle in 1917
- Born: 24 August 1864; Walton-on-Thames, England
- Died: 25 January 1935 (aged 70); London, England
- Education: Cambridge University
- Occupations: Engineer and Major-General of the British Army
- Spouse: Beatrix Chapman
- Father: Casimir de Candolle
- Relatives: Richard Émile Augustin de Candolle (brother)

Raymond Charles Pyramus de Candolle (24 August 1864 – 25 January 1935) was a British railway engineer and a Major General in the British Army. After graduating in engineering at the University of Cambridge in 1886, he joined James Livesey & Son (railway engineering contractors) and undertook railway building assignments in Mexico, Spain, China and Argentina, where he became Director of the Buenos Aires Great Southern Railways (BAGS) in 1907. During the First World War he was recruited as Brigadier-General and was sent to Romania, Russia and Anatolia on a series of railway-related missions. Later, he was sent to Russia again in 1917 to sort out the Trans-Siberian Railway. Raymond was promoted to Major-General and Director General of Mesopotamian Transportation in 1918. He was one of the British representatives at the Paris peace conference in 1919.

== Early life and career ==
Raymond de Candolle was born on 24 August 1864 in Walton-on-Thames, Surrey, the son of Casimir de Candolle, a botanist, and Anne-Mathilde Marcet. He belonged to a prominent family from Geneva, Switzerland, and was a great-grandson of the botanist Augustin Pyramus de Candolle and the physician Alexander Marcet. Raymond's younger brother, Richard Émile Augustin de Candolle, became British Consul in Geneva. Raymond graduated from Cambridge University in 1886.

After graduation, Candolle traveled to the United States, then to Mexico, where he was put to work modernizing railroads. He returned to London in 1981 and became a partner of the railroad contractors Livesey, Son, and Henderson. Later works included the West Galicia Railway in 1896, a connecting line to coalfields in Beijing in 1904, and the Buenos Aires Great Southern Railway in 1908, where he worked until the start of World War I.

In 1902 he received the Imperial Service Medal for his work in South America.

== British Army ==
Railways were a solution to the supply issues faced by troops on the Eastern Front during World War I. Candolle's skills as an engineer as well as his knowledge of French quickly led him to be appointed liaison officer to the French general Berthelot, then leading the French army corps in Romania. As Brigadier-General, in 1916 Candolle headed the railway mission to Romania to fix the narrow-gauge railway line across Bessarabia from Odessa. He stayed for a time in the Balkans before being transferred further east, to Ataman Aleksei Kaledine, general of the White armies. Candolle represented the British crown in Rostov, briefly acting as British Consul there.

He was ordered to Russia in July 1917 with intent to assist work on the Trans-Siberian Railway in advance of an assignment by the Royal Flying Corps. His work was interrupted by the October Revolution. At the time, Candolle was considered the most capable British railway man in Russia. He believed that "co-operation with the Bolsheviks was the best means of serving the allied cause", and assisted in diplomatic efforts with R. H. Bruce Lockhart.

Following the Sykes-Picot agreement for the partition of the Middle East in 1916, Candolle was promoted to Major-General and Director General of Mesopotamian Transportation in 1918 and was assigned to restructure the region's transport.

Later, de Candolle became Manager of the Ottoman Railway Company in 1922. Sent there by Downing Street, he witnessed first hand the final outcome of the Greco-Turkish War and the Burning of Smyrna. He and his then wife Beatrix de Candolle were instrumental in the evacuation of British citizens and other nationalities on the King George V. De Candolle went to Constantinople once he had negotiated the security of the railway with Mustafa Kemal.

== Later life ==
Candolle was appointed to a number of League of Nations committees dealing with the development of international transportation. He was a key spokesman in the Permanent Committee for transport by Rail, and became involved with railway disputes in Czechoslovakia and opium production in Persia. His most active participation eventually centred around the development of transport by container.

He remained secretive and modest about his interventions. When asked by Ian Fleming to talk about his career, he responded: "I am only mysterious because I am not famous enough to be talked about. My ancestors did mysterious things with plants, and everybody talked about them. A little bit like a child, I decided to build railways, and it also proved to be quite exciting."

Raymond de Candolle C.B., C.E., died on 25 January 1935, aged 71, at the Almonds Hotel, London.
