= Peperomia quadrifolia =

Scientific classification
- Kingdom: Plantae
- Clade: Tracheophytes
- Clade: Angiosperms
- Clade: Magnoliids
- Order: Piperales
- Family: Piperaceae
- Genus: Peperomia
- Species: P. quadrifolia

Binomial name
- Peperomia quadrifolia (L.) Kunth

Synonyms
- List: Acrocarpidium jamesonianum Miq.; Peperomia alpina M.Martens & Galeotti; Peperomia cabaiana Trel.; Peperomia circulifolia Trel.; Peperomia collicola Trel.; Peperomia jamesoniana (Miq.) C.DC.; Peperomia luxii C.DC.; Peperomia portulacifolia Kunth; Peperomia pseudotetraphylla Trel.; Peperomia quadrifolia f. angusta Dahlst.; Peperomia rioalbae Trel.; Peperomia santa-rosana C.DC.; Peperomia schomburgkii C.DC.; Peperomia standleyi Trel.; Peperomia stenocaulis C.DC.; Peperomia subpeltata C.DC.; Peperomia subquadrifolia Trel.; Peperomia subrenifolia Trel. & Yunck.; Peperomia sumichrastii C.DC.; Peperomia tenuicaulis Sodiro; Peperomia yaquena Trel.; Piper affine M.Martens & Galeotti; Piper incisum Rich. ex C.DC.; Piper portulacifolium (Kunth) Poir.; Piper quadrifolium L.

Species of plant

Peperomia quadrifolia is a species of plant in the genus Peperomia of the family Piperaceae. It is endemic to Central and South America.
