= Peperomia deppeana =

Scientific classification
- Kingdom: Plantae
- Clade: Tracheophytes
- Clade: Angiosperms
- Clade: Magnoliids
- Order: Piperales
- Family: Piperaceae
- Genus: Peperomia
- Species: P. deppeana

Binomial name
- Peperomia deppeana Schltdl. & Cham.

Synonyms
- List: Peperomia chucanebana Trel.; Peperomia compaginata Trel.; Peperomia imbricata Trel.; Peperomia polochicana Trel.; Peperomia pseudohoffmannii Trel.; Peperomia rothschuhii C.DC.; Peperomia sepicola Trel.; Piper deppeanum (Schltdl. & Cham.) F.Dietr.

Species of plant

Peperomia deppeana is a species of plant in the genus Peperomia of the family Piperaceae. Its native range reaches from Mexico to Central America.
