= Casimir de Candolle =

Swiss botanist

Anne Casimir Pyramus de Candolle
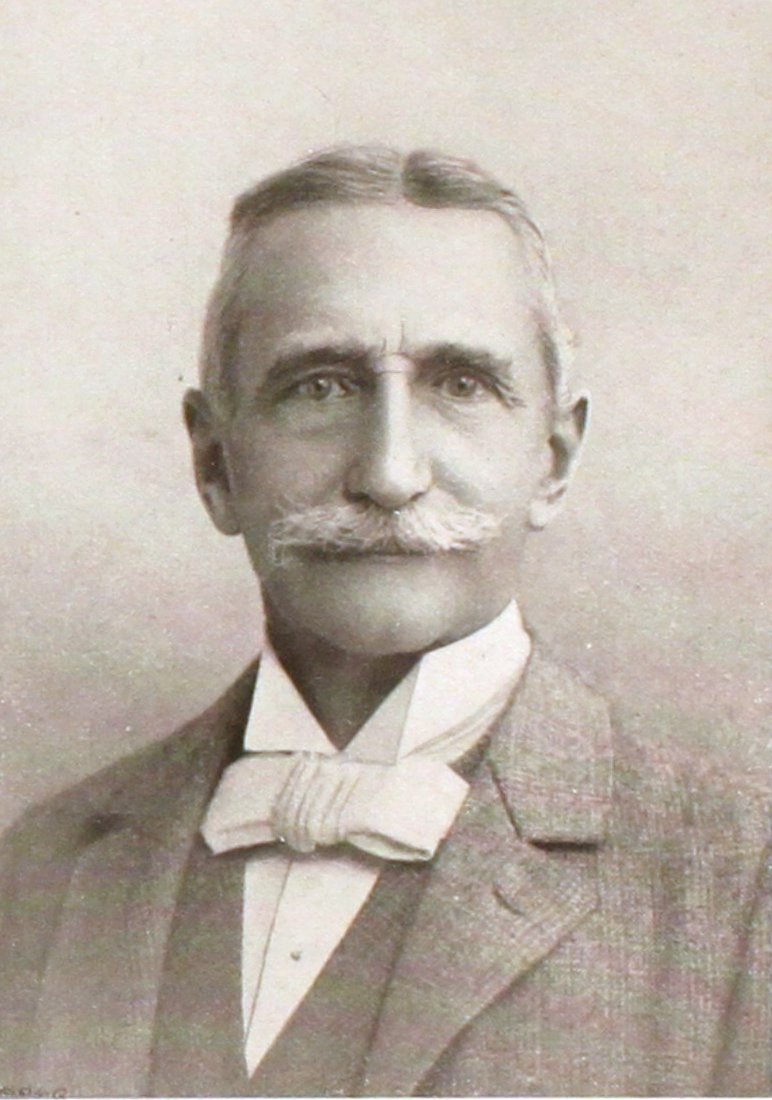
- Anne Casimir Pyramus de Candolle
- Born: 20 February 1836; Geneva
- Died: 3 October 1918 (aged 82); Chêne-Bougeries
- Other names: Anne Casimir Pyrame de Candolle
- Known for: plant systematics, plant physiology
- Spouse: Anna-Mathilde Marcet
- Children: Raymond Charles Pyramus de Candolle (1864–1935), Florence Pauline Lucienne de Candolle (1865–1943), Richard Émile Augustin de Candolle (1868–1920), Reyne Marguerite de Candolle (1876–1958)
- Awards: doctor honoris causa
- Scientific career
- Fields: botany
- Author abbrev. (botany): C.DC.

Anne Casimir Pyramus (or Pyrame) de Candolle (20 February 1836, Geneva – 3 October 1918, Chêne-Bougeries) was a Swiss botanist, the son of Alphonse Pyramus de Candolle.

== Early life and education ==
He studied chemistry, physics and mathematics in Paris (1853–57), later spending time in England, where he met with Miles Berkeley. In 1859 he visited Algeria, and during the following year, continued his education in Berlin. Afterwards, he returned to Geneva as an assistant and colleague to his father. He married Anna-Mathilde Marcet and they had four children: Raymond Charles de Candolle (1864–1935), Florence Pauline Lucienne de Candolle (1865–1943), Richard Émile Augustin de Candolle (1868–1920) and Reyne Marguerite de Candolle (1876–1958).

== Career ==
In the field of plant systematics, he used criteria such as stem structure and/or leaf arrangement as a basis of anatomical criteria. As a plant physiologist, he conducted investigations on the movement of leaves, the curling of tendrils, the effect of low temperatures on seed germination and the influence of ultraviolet radiation on flower formation. He was particularly interested in the botanical family Piperaceae.

He continued work on Monographiae phanerogamarum, a project begun by his father, and was co-editor of the Archives des sciences physiques et naturelles (Geneva). He held honorary degrees (doctor honoris causa) from the universities of Rostock, Geneva, Aberdeen and Uppsala.
