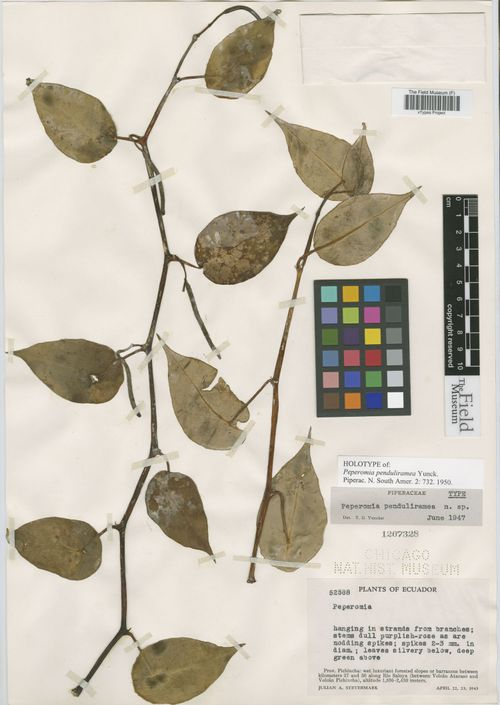

Scientific classification
- Kingdom: Plantae
- Clade: Tracheophytes
- Clade: Angiosperms
- Clade: Magnoliids
- Order: Piperales
- Family: Piperaceae
- Genus: Peperomia
- Species: P. penduliramea

Binomial name
- Peperomia penduliramea Yunck.

= Peperomia penduliramea =

Species of flowering plant

Peperomia penduliramea is a species of epiphyte in the genus Peperomia that is endemic in Ecuador. It grows on wet tropical biomes. Its conservation status is Threatened.

== Description ==
The type specimen where collected near Río Saloya, Ecuador, at an altitude of 1,830–2,340 m (6,000–7,680 ft).

Peperomia penduliramea is an epiphyte that is entirely hairless except for the dense fringe of hairs along the leaf margins. The stems are long-pendulous, dull purplish-rose colored when living, 3–4 mm thick when dry, with internodes 5–7 cm or more long. The alternate leaves are deep green above and silvery beneath when living, ovate, measuring 3–4 cm wide by 7–9 cm long, with attenuately sharp-acuminate apex and rounded base, peltate 10–15 mm from the margin. They are 5–7-nerved from the petiole with the midrib branched near the base and at about the middle, drying leathery and opaque. The petiole is 3–4 cm long. The axillary spikes are nodding, 3 mm thick by 5 cm long, on peduncles about 2 cm long with a bract near the middle. The floral bracts are round-peltate. The ovary is ovoid, obliquely beaked, with stigma anterior near the base of the beak.

The long-pendulous stems, entirely glabrous surfaces except for dense marginal ciliation on the leaves, the dull purplish-rose stem coloration, and the nodding axillary spikes set this species apart.

== Taxonomy and naming ==
It was described in 1950 by Truman G. Yuncker in The Piperaceae of northern South America 2, from specimens collected by Julian Alfred Steyermark. It got its name from description of the species, which literally translates to hanging branches.

== Distribution and habitat ==
It is endemic in Ecuador. It grows on a epiphyte environment and is a herb. It grows on wet tropical biomes.

== Conservation ==
This species is assessed as Threatened, in a preliminary report.
