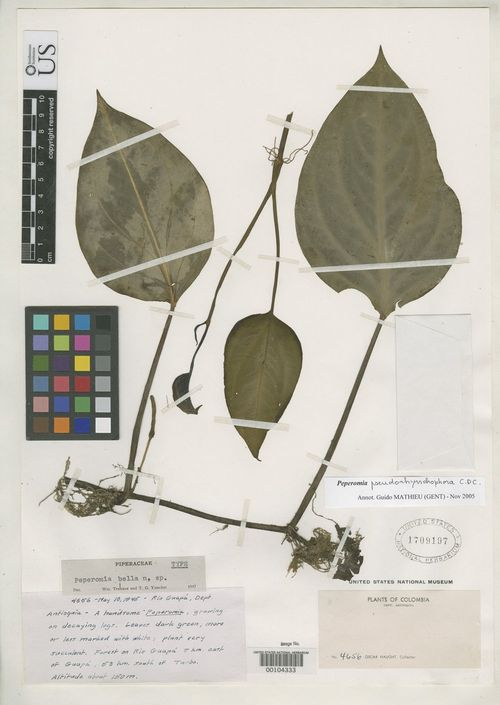

Scientific classification
- Kingdom: Plantae
- Clade: Tracheophytes
- Clade: Angiosperms
- Clade: Magnoliids
- Order: Piperales
- Family: Piperaceae
- Genus: Peperomia
- Species: P. bella

Binomial name
- Peperomia bella Yunck.

= Peperomia bella =

Species of plant

Peperomia duendensis is a species of epiphyte in the genus Peperomia that is endemic in Colombia. It grows on wet tropical biomes. Its conservation status is Threatened.

== Description ==
The first specimens where collected in Antioquia, Colombia.

Peperomia bella is a succulent, hairless, stoloniferous herb notable for its large leaves. The stem is 3 mm thick, rooting at the nodes, with internodes 5–12 cm (2.0–4.7 in) or more long. The alternate leaves are broadly elliptic-ovate, measuring 6–10.5 cm (2.4–4.1 in) wide by 9–16 cm (3.5–6.3 in) long, with a long-tapering pointed apex and base that is truncate to shortly acute. They are dark green with white mottling, slightly fringed with fine hairs at the apex, drying thin and membranous. The venation is distinctive: three pairs of prominent lateral nerves arise within the lowermost 2–3 cm (0.8–1.2 in) of the blade, curving upward, with the innermost pair reaching the apex; the upper branches of the midrib are slender and rather inconspicuous. The petiole is nearly or quite as long as the blade, smooth and hairless. The spike is about 1 mm thick and 4.5 cm (1.8 in) long, borne on a bracted axillary peduncle 3–4 cm (1.2–1.6 in) long. The bracts are round-peltate. The fruit is ellipsoidal with a beak, the beak rather broad at the base and sharply pointed, about 1.2 mm long including the beak; the stigma is positioned anteriorly at the base of the beak.

== Taxonomy and naming ==
It was described in 1950 by Truman G. Yuncker in The Piperaceae of northern South America 2, from specimens collected by Oscar Lee Haught. It got its name from description of the species.

== Subtaxa ==
Following subtaxa are accepted.

- Peperomia tenella var. subcordata Yunck.

== Distribution and habitat ==
It is endemic in Colombia. It grows on a epiphyte environment and is a herb. In Colombia, its elevation range is 100–150 meters (330–490 ft). It grows on wet tropical biomes.

== Conservation ==
This species is assessed as Threatened, in a preliminary report.
