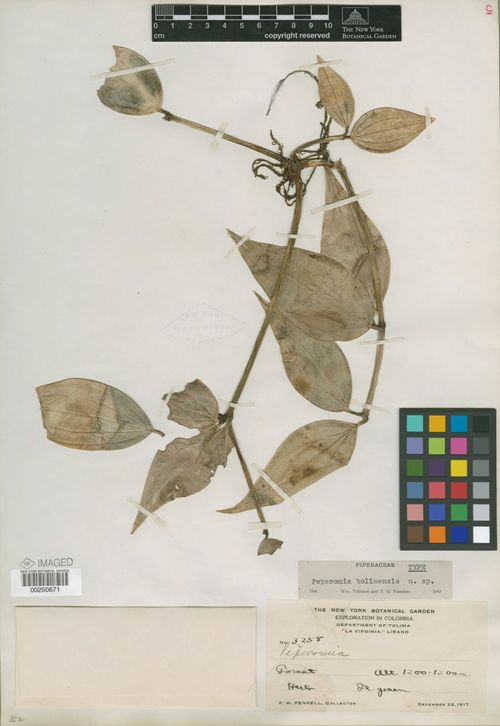

Scientific classification
- Kingdom: Plantae
- Clade: Tracheophytes
- Clade: Angiosperms
- Clade: Magnoliids
- Order: Piperales
- Family: Piperaceae
- Genus: Peperomia
- Species: P. tolimensis

Binomial name
- Peperomia tolimensis Trel. & Yunck.

= Peperomia tolimensis =

Species of flowering plant

Peperomia tolimensis is a species of epiphyte in the genus Peperomia that is endemic in Colombia. It primarily grows on wet tropical biomes. Its conservation status is Threatened.

== Description ==
The first specimens where collected in Tolima, Colombia.

Peperomia tolimensisis a wide-spreading, branching, and assurgent herb. When drying angular and rigid, its stems are 3–4 mm thick, branches ascend up to 25 cm or more, and it is sparsely puberulent, with internodes up to 15 cm long. The leaves alternate, elliptic-lanceolate, and it is 2.5–4.5 cm wide and 5-10 long. It is an acuminate apex, abruptly acute at the base, palmately 5-nerved or the innermost pair is slightly with the midrib. The nerves are impressed above, salient beneath, drying coriaceous and transulent, minutely pellucid-dotted. It is punctulate and glabrate near the base above and sparsely puberulent beneath. The petiole is up to 3 mm long, more or less puberulent. The spikes aren't present.

== Taxonomy and Naming ==
It was described in 1950 by Trel. & Yunck. in The Piperaceae of northern South America, from specimens collected by Francis W. Pennell. It got its name from the location of the specimens where it was first found, which was Tolima, Colombia.

== Distribution and Habitat ==
It is endemic in Colombia. It grows on an epiphyte environment and is a herb. Its elevation range is 1200–1500 meters. It grows on wet tropical biomes.

== Conservation ==
This species is assessed as Threatened, in a preliminary report.
