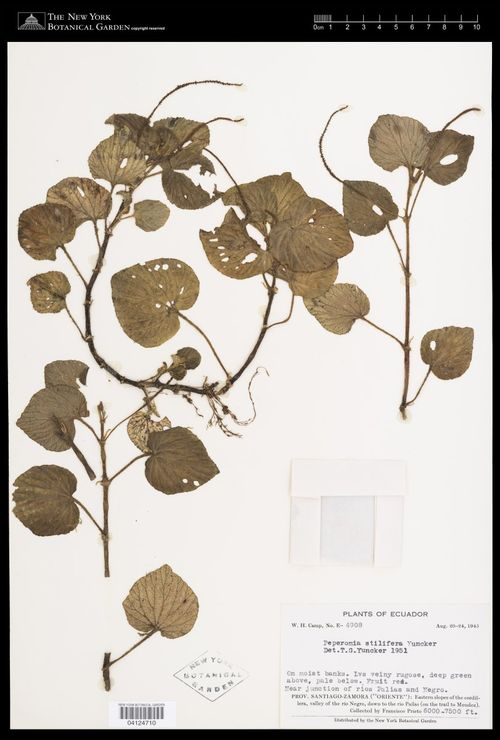

Scientific classification
- Kingdom: Plantae
- Clade: Tracheophytes
- Clade: Angiosperms
- Clade: Magnoliids
- Order: Piperales
- Family: Piperaceae
- Genus: Peperomia
- Species: P. stilifera

Binomial name
- Peperomia stilifera Yunck.

= Peperomia stilifera =

Species of flowering plant

Peperomia stilifera is a species of epiphyte in the genus Peperomia that is endemic in Ecuador. Its conservation status is Threatened.

== Description ==
The first specimens where collected in Santiago-Zamora, Ecuador.

Peperomia stilifera is a moderately sized, spreading, glabrous terrestrial herb. The stem is dull purple when living, measuring 3–4 mm thick, with branches ascending 10–15 cm or more from a prostrate rooting base; these stems are more or less ridged with irregularly winged ridges. The alternate leaves are round-ovate, 3.5–5.5 cm wide by 4–6 cm long, with an obtuse or somewhat acute apex and cordate base. They are palmately 7-nerved, with the nerves and midrib strongly branched upward and somewhat impressed above; beneath, they bear irregular membranous wings and are dark glandular-dotted, very rugose on both sides, deep dull green above when living and paler beneath, drying thin and translucent with subpellucid dots. The petiole reaches up to 5 cm long, longitudinally ridged with irregular membranous wings. The leaf-opposed spikes are 1 mm thick by 7–8 cm or more long, borne on filiform peduncles 2–3 cm long that are longitudinally striate with narrow, irregular, membranous wings. The bracts are round-peltate. The fruit is ovoid, glandular-verrucose, with a stout style and terminal stigma.

== Taxonomy and naming ==
It was described in 1950 by Truman G. Yuncker in The Piperaceae of northern South America 2, from specimens collected by Julian Alfred Steyermark.

== Subtaxa ==
Following subtaxa are accepted.

- Peperomia tenella var. nana Yunck.

== Distribution and habitat ==
It is endemic in Ecuador. It grows on a epiphyte environment and is a herb.

== Conservation ==
This species is assessed as Threatened, in a preliminary report.
