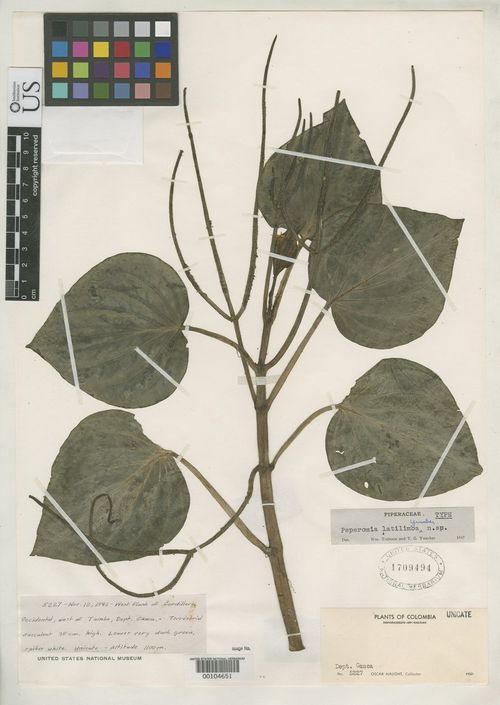

Scientific classification
- Kingdom: Plantae
- Clade: Tracheophytes
- Clade: Angiosperms
- Clade: Magnoliids
- Order: Piperales
- Family: Piperaceae
- Genus: Peperomia
- Species: P. latilimba

Binomial name
- Peperomia latilimba Yunck.

= Peperomia latilimba =

Species of flowering plant

Peperomia latilimba is a species of epiphyte in the genus Peperomia that is endemic in Colombia. It grows on wet tropical biomes. Its conservation status is Threatened.

== Description ==
The type specimen was collected in Tambo, Colombia.

Peperomia latilimba is a terrestrial, succulent herb with a stem 10 mm or more thick at the base, reaching up to 35 cm (14 in) tall, somewhat finely hairy above and becoming hairless downward, with internodes 2–6 cm or more long. The alternate leaves are broadly round-ovate, measuring 9–10 cm wide by 10–11 cm long, with acute apex and shallowly cordate base. They are 13-plinerved, with the midrib branching within the lowermost 3 cm, finely hairy on the nerves near the base above, hairless beneath or slightly finely hairy on the nerves at the base, and fringed with fine hairs along the margin. The leaves dry membranous and translucent. The petioles are 5.5–9 cm long and somewhat finely hairy. The spikes are 3–4 mm thick by 10–17 cm long, 2 or 3 on a common, sympodial, finely hairy stalk 5–8 cm long, on peduncles 1–2 cm long that are velvety-puberulent. The bracts are round-peltate. The fruit is ellipsoidal with a beak, about 1 mm long including the acute beak, with stigma anterior at the base of the beak.

The combination of its large, rounded, cordate leaves (10–11 cm long and nearly as wide) with 13 main veins, the rather long petioles (5.5–9 cm), and multiple spikes (2 or 3) on sympodial stalks 5–8 cm long characterize this species. It sets apart from P. multiplinervia, which has similar leaf shape and size but differs in being 13-plinerved and hairy along the nerves

== Taxonomy and naming ==
It was described in 1950 by Truman G. Yuncker in The Piperaceae of northern South America 2, from specimens collected by Oscar Lee Haught. It got its name from the description of the type specimen.

== Distribution and habitat ==
It is endemic in Colombia. It grows on a epiphyte environment and is a herb. In Colombia, its elevation range is 1,100 meters (3,600 ft). It grows on wet tropical biomes.

== Conservation ==
This species is assessed as Threatened, in a preliminary report.
