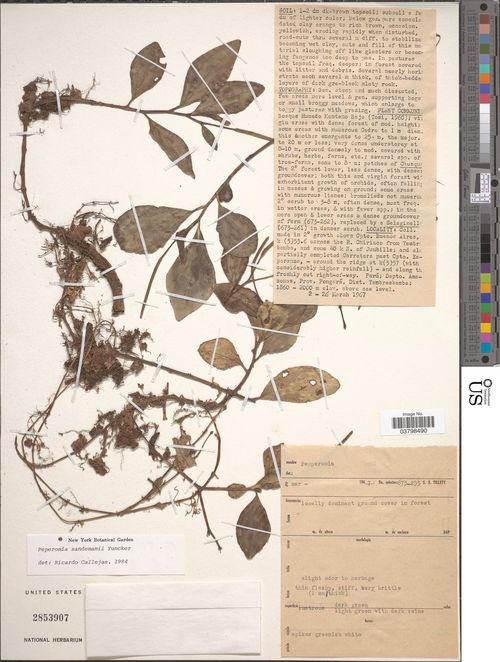

Scientific classification
- Kingdom: Plantae
- Clade: Tracheophytes
- Clade: Angiosperms
- Clade: Magnoliids
- Order: Piperales
- Family: Piperaceae
- Genus: Peperomia
- Species: P. sandemanii

Binomial name
- Peperomia sandemanii Yunck.

= Peperomia sandemanii =

Species of flowering plant

Peperomia sandemanii is a species of epiphyte in the genus Peperomia that is endemic in Peru. Its conservation status is Threatened.

== Description ==
The first specimens where collected in Huacapistana, Peru.

Peperomia scutilimba is a succulent, repent-assurgent, glabrous, and terrestrial herb. Its stems are 2–3 mm thick when dry that ascends up to 15 cm or more from the rooting base. Its internodes are mostly 1-1.5 cm long, winged by the decurrent ridges below the nodes. The leaves alternate, elliptic or obovoate, rounded or slightly contracted to retuse at apex. The notch is minutely hirtellous, cuneate at base, 2-2.5 cm wide and 3–5 cm long. Drying firm, narrowly revoluate, translucent, 7-plinerved, the inner nerves coalescing with the midrib within the lowermost 5 mm, the midrib and nerves are branched upward. The petioles are 5–7 mm long, channelled above, clasping-decurrent. The axillary spikes are at the tip, 1 mm thick and 3.5 cm long. The peduncles are 1-1.5 cm long. The bracts are round. The ovary is ovoid with oblique, acute tip. The stigma is subapical.

The glabrous stems and leaves, elliptic, retuse, plinerved nerves, and clasping-decurrent petioles are the distinguishing characteristics of this species.

== Taxonomy and naming ==
It was described in 1950 by Truman G. Yuncker in American Journal of Botany 39, from specimens collected by Christopher Sandeman. It got its name from the person who collected the first specimens, who was Christopher Sandeman.

== Distribution and habitat ==
It is endemic in Bolivia. It grows on a epiphyte environment and is a herb.

== Conservation ==
This species is assessed as Threatened, in a preliminary report.
