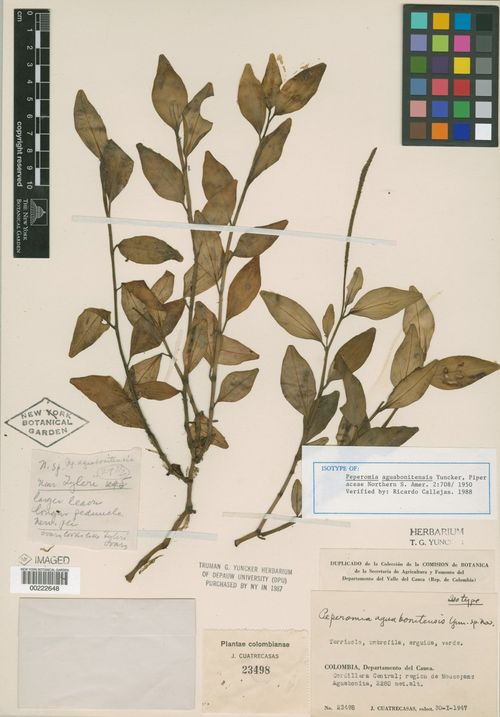

Scientific classification
- Kingdom: Plantae
- Clade: Tracheophytes
- Clade: Angiosperms
- Clade: Magnoliids
- Order: Piperales
- Family: Piperaceae
- Genus: Peperomia
- Species: P. aguabonitensis

Binomial name
- Peperomia aguabonitensis Yunck.

= Peperomia aguabonitensis =

Species of plant endemic to Colombia

Peperomia aguabonitensis is a species of epiphyte in the genus Peperomia that is endemic in Colombia. It grows on wet tropical biomes. Its conservation status is Threatened.

== Description ==
The first specimens where collected in Aguabonita, Colombia.

Peperomia aguabonitensis is a medium-sized, ascending, hairless terrestrial herb that branches from the base, with branches ascending to 20 cm (7.9 in) or more from a decumbent, rooting base. The internodes are mostly about 2 cm long. The alternate leaves are elliptic-lanceolate, measuring 1.5–2 cm wide by 3–4.5 cm long, with a narrowed, blunt, notched apex that is bristly-hairy in the notch, and acute base. They are 3-plinerved, with the lateral nerves joining the midrib in the lowermost 5 mm, and the midrib and laterals branching upward. The leaves dry firm, translucent, and somewhat dotted beneath. The petiole is about 5 mm long, clasping and decurrent. The terminal or sympodial spikes are 2–3 mm thick and 6–8 cm long, on peduncles 2–3 cm long. The bracts are round-peltate. The ovary has an obliquely shield-shaped apex with an apical stigma. Fruit was not fully matured at the time of description, though it may eventually become stalked.

It closely resembles P. tyleri in ovary structure and general vegetative appearance, but differs markedly in its larger, plinerved leaves (1.5–2 cm wide by 3–4.5 cm long versus smaller leaves in P. tyleri) and longer peduncles (2–3 cm versus shorter in P. tyleri).

== Taxonomy and naming ==
It was described in 1950 by Truman G. Yuncker in The Piperaceae of northern South America 2, from specimens collected by José Cuatrecasas. It got its name from location where the first specimens were collected.

== Distribution and habitat ==
It is endemic in Colombia. It grows on a epiphyte environment and is a herb. In Colombia, its elevation range is 2,100–2,280 meters (6,890–7,480 ft). It grows on wet tropical biomes.

== Conservation ==
This species is assessed as Threatened, in a preliminary report.
