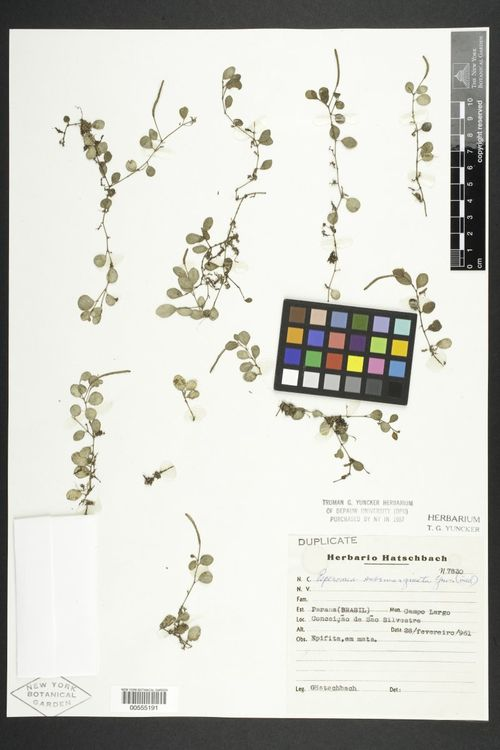

Scientific classification
- Kingdom: Plantae
- Clade: Tracheophytes
- Clade: Angiosperms
- Clade: Magnoliids
- Order: Piperales
- Family: Piperaceae
- Genus: Peperomia
- Species: P. subemarginata

Binomial name
- Peperomia subemarginata Yunck.

= Peperomia subemarginata =

Species of flowering plant

Peperomia subemarginata is a species of epiphyte in the genus Peperomia that is endemic in Brazil. It grows on wet tropical biomes. Its conservation status is Threatened.

== Description ==
The first specimens where collected in Paraná, Brazil.

Peperomia subemarginata is a small, freely branching, creeping herb that grows on trees. The stem is minutely hirtellous, measuring 1 mm thick when dry, and roots from the lower nodes; the fruiting branches ascend to about 5 cm, with internodes 5–20 mm long. The alternate leaves are round, ovate, or broadly elliptic, with rounded, commonly shallowly notched apices and obtuse or somewhat acute bases, measuring 8–14 mm wide and 8–17 mm long. They are glabrous above or thinly hirtellous near the margin, thinly minutely hirtellous along the midrib beneath, ciliate at least toward the apex, palmately 3–5-nerved with a submarginal nervule above the middle, glandular-dotted, drying rather thin, translucent, and pellucid-dotted. The petiole is 3–5 mm long, canaliculate, and minutely hirtellous. The terminal and upper axillary spikes are 2 mm thick and 2–3 cm long, borne on peduncles about 1 cm long that are minutely hirtellous; the rachis is verrucose. The bracts are round-peltate. The drupe is about 0.75 mm long, globose-ovoid, with a conic style and apical stigma.

The combination of its minutely hirtellous stems, petioles, and peduncles, together with the rounded, shallowly emarginate (notched) leaf apices, the distinctive submarginal nervule above the middle of the leaf, and the verrucose rachis of the spikes set it apart from other Peperomia species.

== Taxonomy and naming ==
It was described in 1966 by Truman G. Yuncker in Boletim do Instituto de Botânica 3, from specimens collected by Per Karl Hjalmar Dusén.

== Distribution and habitat ==
It is endemic in Brazil. It grows on a epiphyte environment and is a herb. It grows on wet tropical biomes.

== Conservation ==
This species is assessed as Threatened, in a preliminary report.
