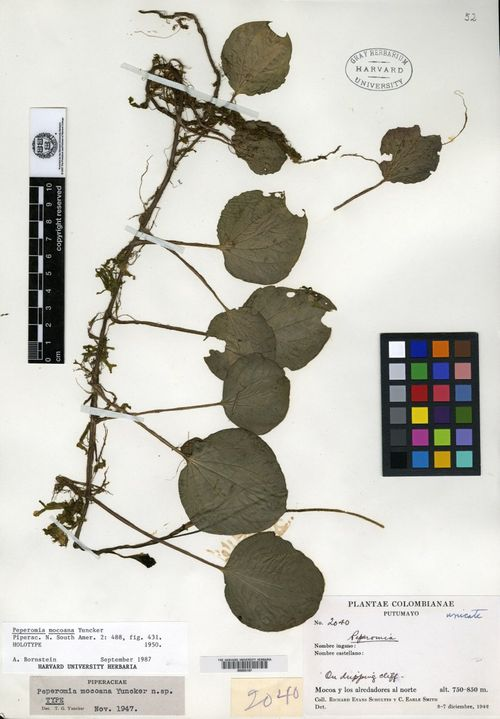

Scientific classification
- Kingdom: Plantae
- Clade: Tracheophytes
- Clade: Angiosperms
- Clade: Magnoliids
- Order: Piperales
- Family: Piperaceae
- Genus: Peperomia
- Species: P. mocoana

Binomial name
- Peperomia mocoana Yunck.

= Peperomia mocoana =

Species of flowering plant

Peperomia mocoana is a species of epiphyte in the genus Peperomia that is endemic in Colombia. It grows on wet tropical biomes. Its conservation status is Threatened.

== Description ==
The type specimen where collected in Mocoa, Colombia.

Peperomia mocoana is a spreading, creeping, nearly hairless herb with stems 2–3 mm thick, rooting at the nodes, hairless, with thin, narrow, membranous longitudinal ridges, and internodes about 4 cm (1.6 in) long. The alternate leaves are suborbicular, 4–6.5 cm (1.6–2.6 in) in diameter, with rounded, obtuse apex and rounded base that is abruptly short-acute at the petiole. They are hairless above, minutely finely hairy along the nerves beneath, palmately 7-nerved or 9-nerved with the lowermost pair of nerves slender and obscure. The midrib and lateral nerves are slenderly branched upward, with thin membranous ridges beneath that become wider and narrowly wing-like toward the base of the blade and continue down the petiole. The leaves dry thin and membranous. The petiole is 5–9 cm (2.0–3.5 in) long, very minutely finely hairy, clasping and decurrent. The leaf-opposed spikes near the apex of the short ascending end of the stem are young at the time of description, 1.5 mm thick by 8 cm (3.1 in) long, on slender peduncles 5 cm long that are obscurely minutely finely hairy. The bracts are round-peltate with yellow glandular dots. The ovary is top-shaped with apical stigma. Fruit was not mature.

The combination of its spreading habit with prominently ridged stems, petioles, and nerves—the ridges being thin, narrow, membranous, and wing-like toward the leaf base and continuing down the petiole—together with the larger, scarcely cordate suborbicular leaves (4–6.5 cm diameter), and longer peduncles (5 cm) characterize this species. It resembles P. Grisarii but differs in these prominently ridged features and leaf shape

== Taxonomy and naming ==
It was described in 1950 by Truman G. Yuncker in The Piperaceae of northern South America 2, from specimens collected by Oscar Lee Haught. It got its name from the location of where the type specimen was collected, which was in Mocoa.

== Distribution and habitat ==
It is endemic in Colombia. It grows on a epiphyte environment and is a herb. In Colombia, its elevation range is 750–850 meters (2,460–2,790 ft). It grows on wet tropical biomes.

== Conservation ==
This species is assessed as Threatened, in a preliminary report.
