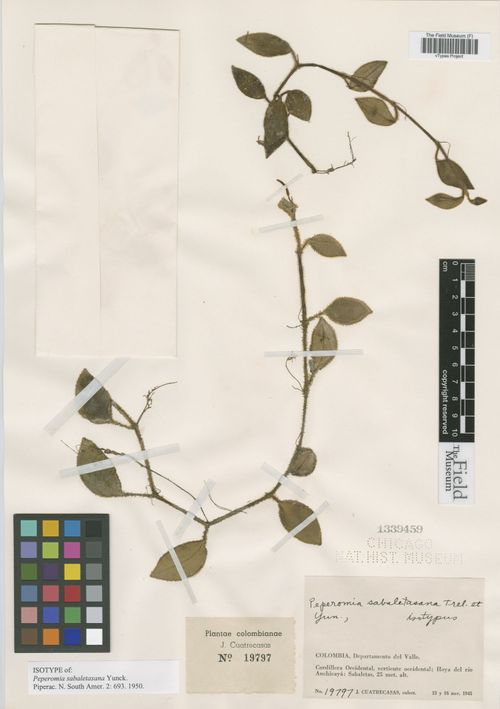

Scientific classification
- Kingdom: Plantae
- Clade: Tracheophytes
- Clade: Angiosperms
- Clade: Magnoliids
- Order: Piperales
- Family: Piperaceae
- Genus: Peperomia
- Species: P. sabaletasana

Binomial name
- Peperomia sabaletasana Yunck.

= Peperomia sabaletasana =

Species of flowering plant

Peperomia sabaletasana is a species of epiphyte in the genus Peperomia that is endemic in Colombia. Its conservation status is Threatened.

== Description ==
The first specimens where collected in Colombia.

Peperomia sabaletasana is a repent, branching, densely rusty-villous, epiphytic herb, with hairs about 2 mm long. Its stems are 2 mm thick, rooting at the nodes, and branches ascending to 5-10 cm. The leaves alternate, elliptic-sublanceolate that is 1.5-2 cm wide and 2.5-4cm long. The tip and base is acute, drying subcoriaceous and opaque, dark above, pale yellow beneath, appressed-villous above, also beneath especially along the midrib with its characteristics being densely long-ciliate. It is 7-plinerved from below the middle, the lateral nerves are scarcely evident. The petioles are 1-2 cm long and densely villous. The axillary spikes are at the tip, as yet young, it is 1 cm long with a 2 cm villous stalk. The bracts are round. The ovary is rostrate. The stigma at the base is at the tip. The fruit is not matured.

The size and shape of the leaves, together with its densely villous parts distinguish this species.

== Taxonomy and naming ==
It was described in 1950 by Truman G. Yuncker in The Piperaceae of northern South America 2, from specimens collected by José Cuatrecasas. It got its name from the location where the specimens were first collected, which were in Sabaletas.

== Distribution and habitat ==
It is endemic in Colombia. It grows on a epiphyte environment and is a herb. In Colombia, its elevation range is 25 meters.

== Conservation ==
This species is assessed as Threatened, in a preliminary report.
