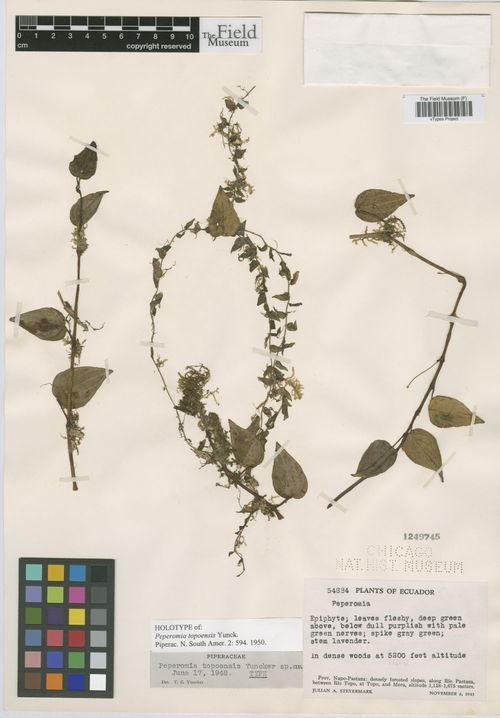

Scientific classification
- Kingdom: Plantae
- Clade: Tracheophytes
- Clade: Angiosperms
- Clade: Magnoliids
- Order: Piperales
- Family: Piperaceae
- Genus: Peperomia
- Species: P. topoensis

Binomial name
- Peperomia topoensis Trel. & Yunck.

= Peperomia topoensis =

Species of flowering plant

Peperomia topoensis is a species of epiphyte in the genus Peperomia that is endemic in Ecuador. It primarily grows on wet tropical biomes. Its conservation status is Threatened.

== Description ==
The first specimens where collected in Napo, Ecuador at an altitude of 1158–1675 meters.

Peperomia topoensis is a moderately small, glabrous, assurgent, and epiphytic herb. Its stems are 2 mm thick that ascends up to 15 cm or more from a decumbent rooting base. It is lavender when growing. Its internodes are mostly 1–3 cm long. Its leaves are fleshy, alternate, elliptic-ovate, that is 2-2.5 cm wide and 3–4 cm long. Its apex gradually acuminates. Its leaves are rounded, cordulate, and 7-plinerved. The innermost pair of lateral nerves coalesces with the midrib within the lowermost 5 mm. It is ciliolate near the tip, deep green above, dull purplish with a pale green nerves when growing. When is subcoriaceous and translucent when it's drying. Its petiole is 1-1.5 cm long clasping-decurrent. Its spikes at the tip are 2 mm thick and 4 cm or more long. Its peduncle is about 1 cm long. Its bracts are round. It has an ovoid ovary with an oblique tip. Its stigma is near to the tip.

The glabrous stems and ovate, cordulate, 7-plinerved leaves are the distinctive characteristics of P. topoensis.

== Taxonomy and Naming ==
It was described in 1950 by Truman G. Yuncker in The Piperaceae of northern South America, from specimens collected by Julian Alfred Steyermark in 1943. It got its name from the location where its first specimens were collected, which was along the Rio Pastaze, between Rio Topo, at Topo.

== Distribution and Habitat ==
It is endemic in Ecuador. It grows on an epiphyte environment and is a herb. It grows on wet tropical biomes.

== Conservation ==
This species is assessed as Threatened, in a preliminary report.
