= Peperomia aroensis =

Scientific classification
- Kingdom: Plantae
- Clade: Tracheophytes
- Clade: Angiosperms
- Clade: Magnoliids
- Order: Piperales
- Family: Piperaceae
- Genus: Peperomia
- Species: P. aroensis

Binomial name
- Peperomia aroensis Steyerm.

Species of epiphyte

Peperomia aroensis is a species of epiphyte in the genus Peperomia that is endemic in Venezuela. It grows on wet tropical biomes. Its conservation status is Threatened.

== Description ==
The type specimen was collected near Sierra de Aroa, Venezuela.

Peperomia aroensis is a terrestrial, creeping herb that is completely smooth and hairless, rooting at the stem nodes. The stem is elongated, at least 45 centimeters long, and 1 to 1.5 millimeters thick, with internodes measuring 2.7 to 7 centimeters long. The leaves are alternate, broadly oval to nearly round-oval, with an abruptly narrowed tip. The leaf base is rounded and shallowly heart-shaped with a slightly shield-like attachment. Each leaf has 7 to 9 veins radiating from the base in a palmate pattern, with the upper side veins arising 3 to 5 millimeters above the leaf base. The leaf blade is 4.5 to 5.5 centimeters long and 3.5 to 4.5 centimeters wide, with very fine hairs along the upper margins. The petiole, is 2.5 to 4 centimeters long. The inflorescence is terminal, meaning it grows at the tip of the stem, and is simple in form. The peduncle, is 3 to 4.5 centimeters long, 1 millimeter wide, and 1.5 millimeters thick. The floral bract is 0.7 to 0.8 millimeters long with glandular dots. The anthers are 0.3 to 0.5 millimeters long. The stigma is located in front of the base of a thin beak.

The holotype specimen was previously and questionably placed by Truman G. Yuncker with Peperomia cumbreana, a species that differs from P. aroensis by having hairs on its stems and on the underside of its leaves. Compared to Peperomia tenuimarginata, also collected from the same region of Colombia, P. aroensis differs by having smaller leaves, by having the upper side veins arise from the midvein within the first 3 to 5 millimeters above the leaf base, and by having narrower spikes.

== Taxonomy and naming ==
It was described in 1984 by Julian Alfred Steyermark in Flora de Venezuela 11, from the specimen collected by Leandro Aristeguieta & F. Pannier. The epithet aroensis refers to the type locality.

== Distribution and habitat ==
It is endemic in Venezuela. It grows on a epiphyte environment and is a herb. It grows on wet tropical biomes.

== Conservation ==
This species is assessed as Threatened.
