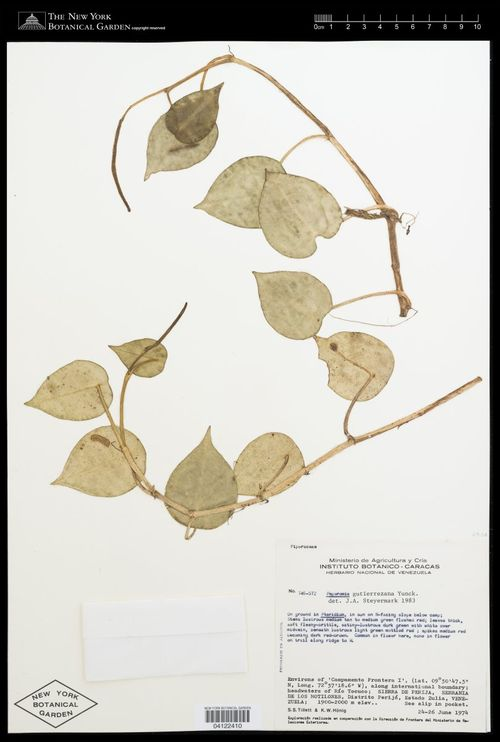

Scientific classification
- Kingdom: Plantae
- Clade: Tracheophytes
- Clade: Angiosperms
- Clade: Magnoliids
- Order: Piperales
- Family: Piperaceae
- Genus: Peperomia
- Species: P. gutierrezana

Binomial name
- Peperomia gutierrezana Yunck.

= Peperomia gutierrezana =

Species of flowering plant

Peperomia gutierrezana is a species of epiphyte in the genus Peperomia that is endemic in Colombia and Venezuela. It grows on wet tropical biomes. Its conservation status is Not Threatened.

== Description ==
The type specimen where collected in Cundinamarca, Colombia.

Peperomia gutierrezana is a moderate-sized, ascending terrestrial herb with a stem 3 mm thick and internodes up to 12 cm (4.7 in) or more long, loosely covered with soft hairs. The rounded-ovate leaves measure 3.5–4.5 cm wide by 5.5–7 cm long, with short-acuminate apex and rounded base, peltate 10–12 mm from the margin. They are very loosely hairy above and nearly hairless, hairy beneath, strongly fringed with hairs along the margin, with about 9 nerves; the innermost pair of lateral nerves joins with the midrib near the base, and the nerves are rather obscure. The petiole is 5–9 cm long and hairy. The spikes are 3 mm thick and 9 cm long, on a somewhat hairy stalk 5–7 cm long that bears a small leaf or bract about 2 cm from the spike. The floral bracts are round-peltate. The fruit is ellipsoidal and beaked, 1.5 mm long including the beak, which is stout with a rounded apex and less than half as long as the fruit; the stigma is positioned anteriorly near the base of the beak.

It is closely related to P. aquilae but differs in its lateral, axillary spikes and somewhat longer petioles.

== Taxonomy and naming ==
It was described in 1950 by Truman G. Yuncker in The Piperaceae of northern South America 2, from specimens collected by Martin Lawrence Grant. It got its name from description of the species.

== Distribution and habitat ==
It is endemic in Colombia and Venezuela. It grows on a epiphyte environment and is a herb. In Colombia, its elevation range is 1,575–2,300 meters (5,170–7,550 ft). It grows on wet tropical biomes.

== Conservation ==
This species is assessed as Not Threatened, in a preliminary report.
