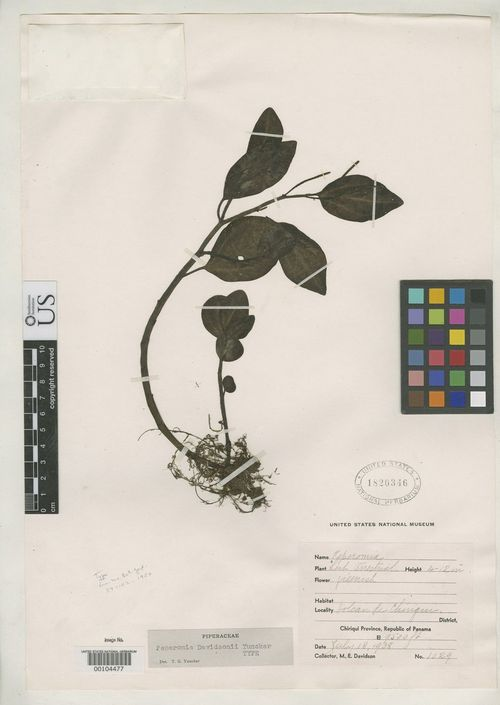

Scientific classification
- Kingdom: Plantae
- Clade: Tracheophytes
- Clade: Angiosperms
- Clade: Magnoliids
- Order: Piperales
- Family: Piperaceae
- Genus: Peperomia
- Species: P. davidsoniae

Binomial name
- Peperomia davidsoniae Yunck.

= Peperomia davidsoniae =

Species of flowering plant

Peperomia davidsoniae or Peperomia davidsonii is a species of subshrub in the genus Peperomia that is endemic in Panama. It grows on wet tropical biomes. Its conservation status is Threatened.

== Description ==
The first specimens where collected in Chiriquí, Panama.

Peperomia davidsoniae is a medium-sized, ascending terrestrial herb with a stem 4 mm thick when dry, ascending to 30 cm (12 in), sparsely covered with crisped hairs above and becoming hairless downward, with internodes 1–2 cm long. The alternate leaves are broadly elliptic or elliptic-obovate, slightly constricted toward the obtuse apex, with base abruptly acute, measuring 2–3.5 cm wide by 3–6 cm long. They are palmately 3-nerved, with the midrib and lateral nerves bearing numerous slender, interconnecting branches, sparsely crisp-hairy on both sides at least along the nerves toward the base, and fringed with fine hairs toward the apex. The leaves dry membranous and translucent, with fine glandular dots beneath. The petioles are 5–15 mm long, grooved above with the groove crisp-hairy, clasping and decurrent. The terminal and axillary spikes are loosely flowered, 1 mm thick by 3 cm long, on peduncles 5–10 mm long that are sparsely crisp-hairy. The bracts are round-peltate. The ovary is ovoid with oblique apex and subapical stigma. Fruit was not matured at the time of description.

It resembles P. pascuicola to a considerable extent, but differs in these leaf shape and pubescence characteristics. The numerous slender, anastomosing branches from the main nerves, the clasping-decurrent petioles with grooved, crisp-hairy surfaces, and the subapical stigma position are additional diagnostic features.

== Taxonomy and naming ==
It was described in 1950 by Truman G. Yuncker in Annals of the Missouri Botanical Garden 37, from specimens collected by Mary Ellen Davidson. It got its name from person who collected the type specimen, M. E. Davidson.

== Distribution and habitat ==
It is endemic to Panama. It grows on a subshrub environment and is a herb. It grows on wet tropical biomes.

== Conservation ==
This species is assessed as Threatened, in a preliminary report.
