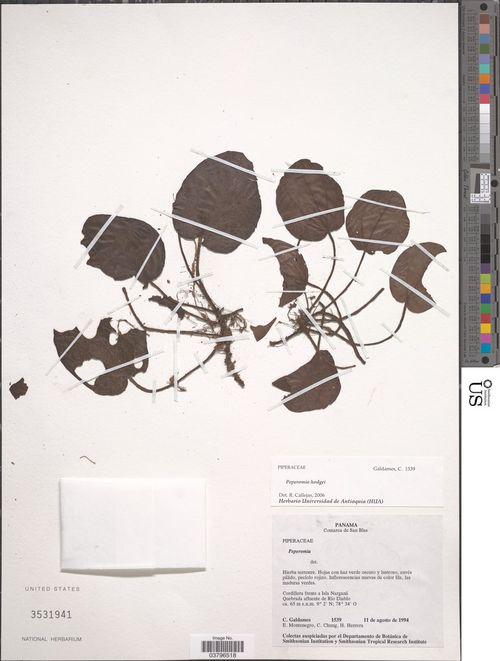

Scientific classification
- Kingdom: Plantae
- Clade: Tracheophytes
- Clade: Angiosperms
- Clade: Magnoliids
- Order: Piperales
- Family: Piperaceae
- Genus: Peperomia
- Species: P. hodgei

Binomial name
- Peperomia hodgei Yunck.

= Peperomia hodgei =

Species of flowering plant

Peperomia hodgei is a species of perennial or epiphyte in the genus Peperomia that is endemic in Panama to Colombia. It grows on wet tropical biomes. Its conservation status is Not Threatened.

== Description ==
The type specimen where collected in Caldas, Colombia.

Peperomia hodgei is a succulent, somewhat stemless, terrestrial herb with a short, thick stem 5 mm in diameter, possibly rhizomatous and hairless. The alternate leaves are rather closely clustered near the end of the fleshy stem, suborbicular or slightly longer than wide, measuring 4–6 cm (1.6–2.4 in) wide by 5–7 cm (2.0–2.8 in) long. The apex is rounded, the base rounded-cordate with a sinus 5–10 mm deep that is closed or nearly so. The upper surface is hairless, while the nerves beneath are laterally hairy near the base and hairless toward the apex; the margin is not fringed with hairs. The leaves are palmately 7–9-nerved, with the innermost pair of lateral nerves sometimes slightly joining with the midrib near the base, and the nerves fork upward. They dry membranous, dark above, paler and minutely dark-dotted beneath. The petiole is 5–10 cm (2.0–3.9 in) long, covered with crisped hairs 0.5–1 mm long. The spikes are leaf-opposed, about 1–2 mm thick by 5–6 cm (2.0–2.4 in) long, loosely flowered, on slender peduncles 2–3 cm (0.8–1.2 in) long that are crisp-hairy. The bracts are round-peltate. The fruit is top-shaped, about 0.7–0.8 mm long, with a large, apical stigma.

The very short stem, rounded, cordate, rather long-petiolate leaves, and turbinate fruit distinguish this species.

== Taxonomy and naming ==
It was described in 1950 by Truman G. Yuncker in The Piperaceae of northern South America 2, from specimens collected by Kjell von Sneidern. It got its name from description of the species.

== Distribution and habitat ==
It is endemic in Panama to Colombia. It grows on a perennial or epiphyte environment and is a herb. In Colombia, its elevation range is 150–400 meters (490–1,310 ft). It grows on wet tropical biomes.

== Conservation ==
This species is assessed as Not Threatened, in a preliminary report.
