= Peperomia venusta =

Scientific classification
- Kingdom: Plantae
- Clade: Embryophytes
- Clade: Tracheophytes
- Clade: Angiosperms
- Clade: Magnoliids
- Order: Piperales
- Family: Piperaceae
- Genus: Peperomia
- Species: P. venusta

Binomial name
- Peperomia venusta Yunck.

Species of subshrub

Peperomia venusta is a species of subshrub from the genus Peperomia. It grows in wet tropical biomes. It was first described by Truman G. Yuncker in 1957.

== Distribution ==
Peperomia venusta is native to Venezuela and Colombia. Specimens can be collected at an elevation of 240-1000 meters.

== Description ==
It is a glabrous herb. The stem lies on the ground and the roots are at the lower nodes. The branches ascend to 10 centimeters or more, it is 1-3 millimeters thick at the base when dry, the internodes are 2 centimeters long above, and lengthen to 10 centimeters or more when downward. Leaves alternate, Broad-lance, gradually narrowed to the blunt tip, peltate are 5-10 millimeters above the rounded base, the lower leaves are 3-4 centimeters wide and 7-8 centimeters long. It is palmately 7-9 nerved, the nerves are conspicuous beneath and obscurely branched upward. The innermost two pairs of lateral nerves gently curve and continue to the tip. It is translucent, glandular-dotted beneath, and lacks ciliolation. The petioles are up to 8 centimeters long on lower leaves and scarcely 1 centimeter long on the smaller upper leaves. Terminal spikes and axillary are 2 millimeters thick and 2-4 centimeters long, and the peduncle to 3 centimeters long.
