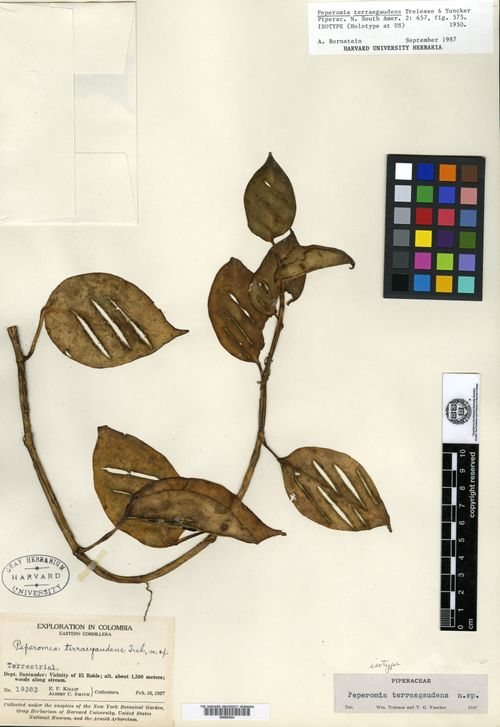

Scientific classification
- Kingdom: Plantae
- Clade: Embryophytes
- Clade: Tracheophytes
- Clade: Angiosperms
- Clade: Magnoliids
- Order: Piperales
- Family: Piperaceae
- Genus: Peperomia
- Species: P. terraegaudens

Binomial name
- Peperomia terraegaudens Trel. & Yunck.

Synonyms
- Peperomia decurrens C.DC Peperomia allartii Trel. Peperomia durandii var. oligostachya C.DC.

= Peperomia terraegaudens =

Species of flowering plant

Peperomia terraegaudens is a species of flowering plant from the genus Peperomia. It was first described by William Trelease & Truman G. Yuncker and published in the book "Piperac. Northern S. Amer. 657 ". It primarily grows on wet tropical biomes. It is endemic to Santander, Colombia. First specimens where found in Santander on February 16, 1927.
