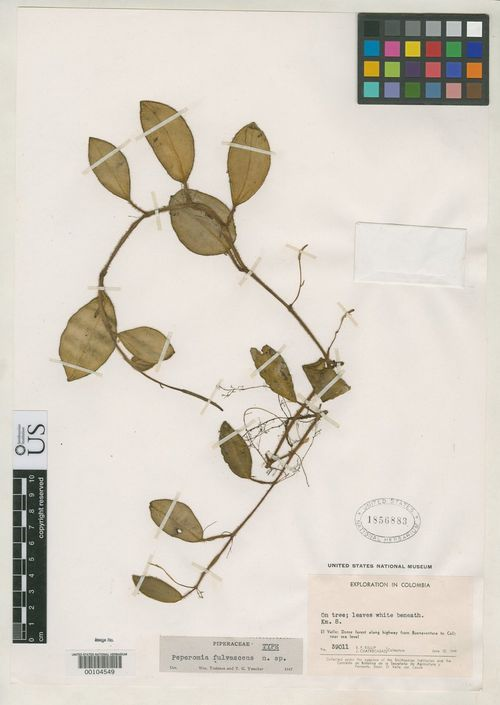

Scientific classification
- Kingdom: Plantae
- Clade: Tracheophytes
- Clade: Angiosperms
- Clade: Magnoliids
- Order: Piperales
- Family: Piperaceae
- Genus: Peperomia
- Species: P. fulvescens

Binomial name
- Peperomia fulvescens Yunck.

= Peperomia fulvescens =

Species of flowering plant

Peperomia fulvescens is a species of epiphyte in the genus Peperomia that is endemic in Colombia. It grows on wet tropical biomes. Its conservation status is Threatened.

== Description ==
The type specimen where collected in El Valle, Colombia.

Peperomia fulvescens is a creeping, branching epiphytic herb densely covered with tawny-yellow hairs up to 2 mm long. The stem is 2 mm thick, with branches ascending up to 20 cm or more and internodes 3–4 cm long. The alternate leaves are elliptic-obovate, measuring 1.5–3.5 cm wide by 3.5–5.5 cm long, with shortly acute apex and acute base, subpeltate with the margin just continuous over the petiole. They are white beneath while growing, drying somewhat opaque, leathery, and saffron-yellow, loosely hairy on both surfaces, densely long-fringed along the margin, 7-plinerved from below the middle with obscure nerves. The petiole is 1–2 cm long and densely hairy. The terminal and axillary spikes are closely flowered, 3 cm long when young, on a 1-bracted, moderately hairy stalk 3–4 cm long. The floral bracts are round-peltate. The ovary has a beak with stigma anterior near the base of the beak. Fruit was not matured at the time of description.

The densely long-villous stems, and leaves which are 7-plinerved, elliptic-obovate, and safron-yellow when dry, distinguish this species.

== Taxonomy and naming ==
It was described in 1950 by Truman G. Yuncker in The Piperaceae of northern South America 2, from specimens collected by Ellsworth Paine Killip & José Cuatrecasas. It got its name from description of the species.

== Distribution and habitat ==
It is endemic in Colombia. It grows on a epiphyte environment and is a herb. In Colombia, its elevation range is 0–100 meters (330 ft). It grows on wet tropical biomes.

== Conservation ==
This species is assessed as Threatened, in a preliminary report.
