= Peperomia tomentella =

Scientific classification
- Kingdom: Plantae
- Clade: Tracheophytes
- Clade: Angiosperms
- Clade: Magnoliids
- Order: Piperales
- Family: Piperaceae
- Genus: Peperomia
- Species: P. tomentella

Binomial name
- Peperomia tomentella Trel. & Yunck.

Species of flowering plant

Peperomia tomentella is a species of flowering plant in the genus Peperomia that is endemic in Colombia. It primarily grows on wet tropical biomes. Its conservation status is Threatened.

== Description ==
The first specimens where collected in Colombia.

Peperomia tomentella is a delicate but large-leaved herb. Its stems are 3 mm thick, somewhat having a dense covering of hairs. The leaves alternate, broadly elliptic, 4–6 cm wide and 6–9 cm long, rounded at both ends, 7-plinerved. The nerves are confluent within the lowermost 10 mm with velvety on the nerves beneath. Its petioles are 2–3 cm long, subtomentose. It has terminal spikes that is 2 mm thick and 2 cm long. Its peduncle is 15 mm crisp-pubescent. Its bracts are round. Its ovary and fruit are not developed.

The species is placed with those having stigmas at the tip because of the close resemblance of its vegetative characters with a number of Peperomia species. The shape of the leaves, pubescence, and nervation distinguish it.

== Taxonomy and Naming ==
It was described in 1950 by Trel. & Yunck. in The Piperaceae of northern South America, from specimens collected by José Celestino Mutis. It got its name from the description of its stem, which means having a dense covering of hairs.

== Distribution and Habitat ==
It is endemic in Colombia. It grows on an epiphyte environment and is a herb. Its elevation range is 1200–1500 meters. It grows on wet tropical biomes.

== Conservation ==
This species is assessed as Threatened, in a preliminary report.
