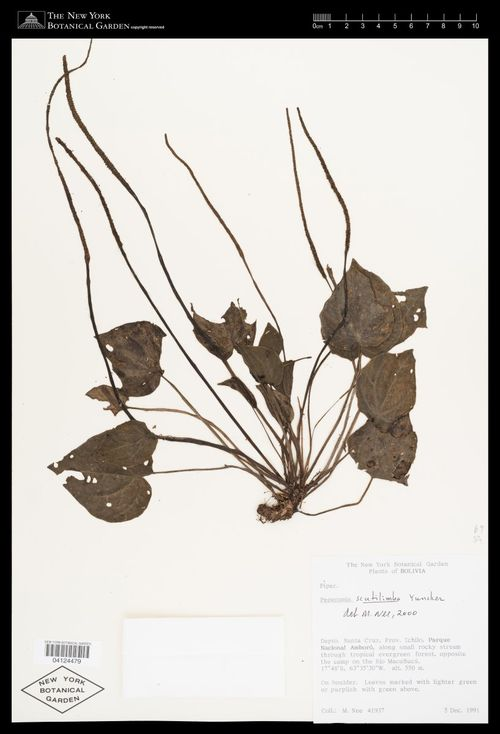

Scientific classification
- Kingdom: Plantae
- Clade: Tracheophytes
- Clade: Angiosperms
- Clade: Magnoliids
- Order: Piperales
- Family: Piperaceae
- Genus: Peperomia
- Species: P. scutilimba

Binomial name
- Peperomia scutilimba Yunck.

= Peperomia scutilimba =

Species of flowering plant

Peperomia scutilimba is a species of epiphyte in the genus Peperomia that is endemic in Peru. Its conservation status is Threatened.

== Description ==
The first specimens where collected in La Paz, Bolivia.

Peperomia scutilimba is a rather small, short-stemmed, glabrous, and terrestrial herb. The stems are 2 mm thick when dry that ascends up to 2–3 cm from the prostrate. The internodes are 2–5 mm long. The leaves alternate, round that are 5–10 mm from the rounded base. The tip is acute that is 3–4.5 cm wide and 3–6 cm long. The tip of the leaf is palmately 7-nerved, the nerves are slender, faintly branched, gladular-dotted, drying thin and membranous, and transulecent. The petioles are up to 7 cm long. The spikes are axillary, rather densely flowered, that are 2 mm thick and 3–4 cm long. The peduncles are up to 4 cm long. The bracts are small and round. The fruits are broadly turbinate and 0.5 mm long with a broad and flattened apex. The stigma is at the tip, specifically at the first pilose.

This species resembles P. arifolia in certain aspects but it differs in its smaller plants and parts, fewer-nerved leaves, etc.

== Taxonomy and naming ==
It was described in 1955 by Truman G. Yuncker in American Journal of Botany 39, from specimens collected by Christopher Sandeman.

== Distribution and Habitat ==
It is endemic in Bolivia. It grows on a epiphyte environment and is a herb.

== Conservation ==
This species is assessed as Threatened, in a preliminary report.
