= Peperomia zipaquirana =

Scientific classification
- Kingdom: Plantae
- Clade: Tracheophytes
- Clade: Angiosperms
- Clade: Magnoliids
- Order: Piperales
- Family: Piperaceae
- Genus: Peperomia
- Species: P. zipaquirana

Binomial name
- Peperomia zipaquirana Trel. & Yunck.

Species of perennial herb

Peperomia zipaquirana is a herbal plant from the genus Peperomia. It was described by William Trelease and Truman G. Yuncker in 1917. It is native to Colombia and Ecuador. It is found at an elevation of 2700 – 2900 meters in Colombia.
