= Peperomia verticillatispica =

Scientific classification
- Kingdom: Plantae
- Clade: Tracheophytes
- Clade: Angiosperms
- Clade: Magnoliids
- Order: Piperales
- Family: Piperaceae
- Genus: Peperomia
- Species: P. verticillatispica

Binomial name
- Peperomia verticillatispica Trel. & Yunck.

Species of epiphyte

Peperomia verticillatispica is a species of epiphyte from the pepper genus Peperomia. It grows in wet tropical biomes. It was first described by William Trelease and Truman G. Yuncker in 1950.

== Distribution ==
Peperomia verticillatispica is native to Ecuador and Colombia. In Colombia, specimens can be found at an elevation of 280–1750 meters. In Ecuador, the specimens were collected at an elevation of 530-1200 meters.
