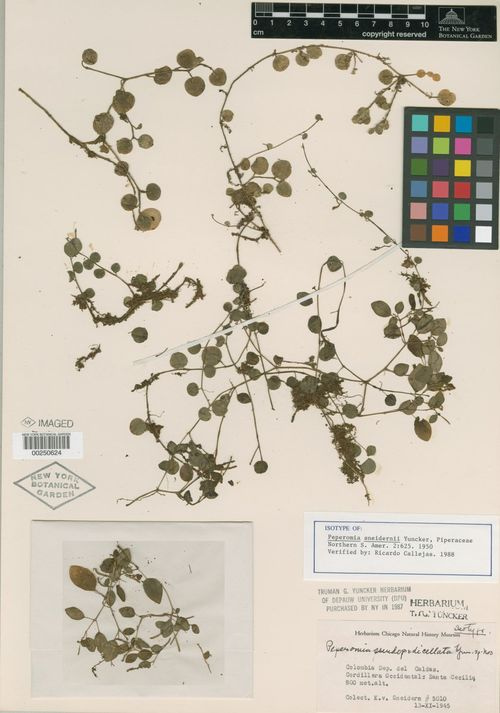

Scientific classification
- Kingdom: Plantae
- Clade: Tracheophytes
- Clade: Angiosperms
- Clade: Magnoliids
- Order: Piperales
- Family: Piperaceae
- Genus: Peperomia
- Species: P. sneidernii

Binomial name
- Peperomia sneidernii Yunck.

= Peperomia sneidernii =

Species of flowering plant

Peperomia sneidernii is a species of epiphyte in the genus Peperomia that is endemic in Colombia. It grows on wet tropical biomes. Its conservation status is Threatened.

== Description ==
The first specimens where collected in Caldas, Colombia.

Peperomia sneiderniiis a small repent herb. The stems are 1-2 mm thick, divaricately branched, rather densely crisp-pubescent. The fruiting branches ascend up to 6-8 cm. The leaves alternate, round, or those on the branchse elliptic, mostly 7-12 mm wide and 7-15 mm long and even rarely up to 15 x 28 mm. Its tip and base is obtuse, crisp-pubescent on both surfaces, ciolate, palmately 3-5 nerved, drying membranous, translucent. The petioles are 3-5 mm long or on larger leaves up to 10 mm, crisp-puberulent, channelled above. There are several spikes that are opposed to the leaf that is about 1 mm thick and 10-12 mm long. The peduncles are slender, 5-8 mm long, and crisp-puberulent. The bracts are round. The fruit is globose that is 0.5 mm long, eventually on proiment pseudopedicels, the tip is oblique. The stigma is at the tip.

The short, clustered, leaf-opposed spikes, and small globose fruits on pseudopedicels distinguish this species.

== Taxonomy and naming ==
It was described in 1950 by Truman G. Yuncker in The Piperaceae of northern South America 2, from specimens collected by Kjell von Sneidern. It got its name from botanist who collected the first specimen, who was Kjell von Sneidern.

== Distribution and habitat ==
It is endemic in Colombia. It grows on a epiphyte environment and is a herb. In Colombia, its elevation range is 800 meters. It grows on wet tropical biomes.

== Conservation ==
This species is assessed as Threatened, in a preliminary report.
