= Peperomia venosa =

Scientific classification
- Kingdom: Plantae
- Clade: Embryophytes
- Clade: Tracheophytes
- Clade: Angiosperms
- Clade: Magnoliids
- Order: Piperales
- Family: Piperaceae
- Genus: Peperomia
- Species: P. venosa

Binomial name
- Peperomia venosa Yunck.

Species of herb

Peperomia venosa is a species of herb from the genus 'Peperomia'. It grows in wet tropical biomes. It was discovered by Truman G. Yuncker in 1950.

== Etymology ==
venosa came from the Latin word "venosus". Venosus means "veiny" or "venous".

== Distribution ==
Peperomia venosa is native to Colombia. Specimens can be found at an altitude of 900–2870 meters.

- Colombia
  - Nariño
    - La Planada Nature Reserve
  - Putumayo
  - Valle del Cauca
    - Cali
