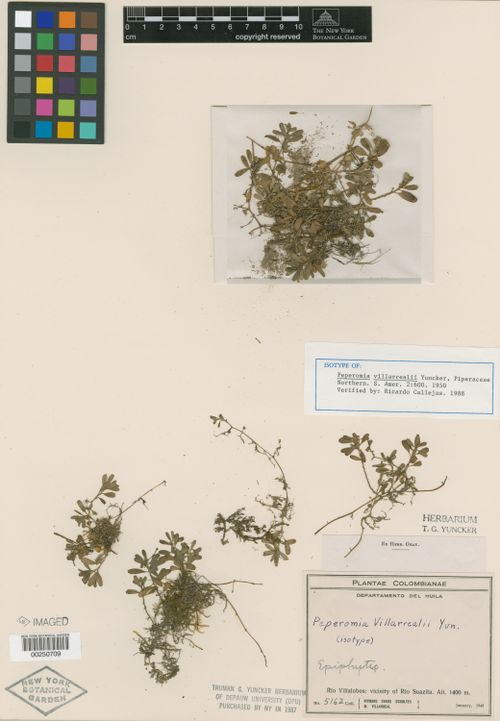

Scientific classification
- Kingdom: Plantae
- Clade: Embryophytes
- Clade: Tracheophytes
- Clade: Angiosperms
- Clade: Magnoliids
- Order: Piperales
- Family: Piperaceae
- Genus: Peperomia
- Species: P. villarrealii

Binomial name
- Peperomia villarrealii Yunck.

= Peperomia villarrealii =

Species of flowering plant

Peperomia villarrealii is a species of epiphyte or lithophyte from the genus Peperomia. It was first described by Truman G. Yuncker and published in the book "The Piperaceae of northern South America 2: 600–601, f. 524. 1950.".

== Distribution ==
First specimens were collected at an altitude of 1,400–2,100 meters (4,600–6,900 ft).

- Colombia
  - Antioquia
- Costa Rica
  - Cartago
  - Limón
- Ecuador
  - Carchi
  - El Oro
  - Napo
