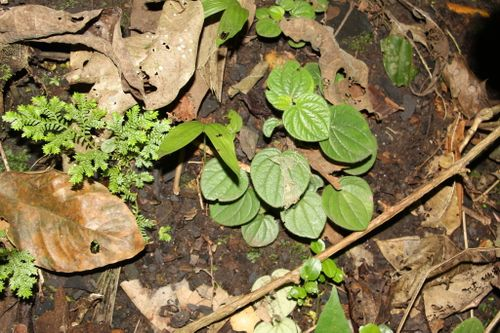

Scientific classification
- Kingdom: Plantae
- Clade: Tracheophytes
- Clade: Angiosperms
- Clade: Magnoliids
- Order: Piperales
- Family: Piperaceae
- Genus: Peperomia
- Species: P. pubirhachis

Binomial name
- Peperomia pubirhachis Yunck.

= Peperomia pubirhachis =

Species of flowering plant

Peperomia pubirhachis is a species of epiphyte in the genus Peperomia that is endemic in Colombia. It grows on wet tropical biomes. Its conservation status is Threatened.

== Description ==
The type specimen was collected in San Francisco, Colombia.

== Taxonomy and naming ==
It was described in 1950 by Truman G. Yuncker in The Piperaceae of northern South America 2, from specimens collected by García Barriga. It got its name from description of the species, which literally translates to hairy rachis.

== Distribution and habitat ==
It is endemic in Colombia. It grows on a epiphyte environment and is a herb. In Colombia, its elevation range is 1550 meters. It grows on wet tropical biomes.

== Conservation ==
This species is assessed as Threatened, in a preliminary report.
