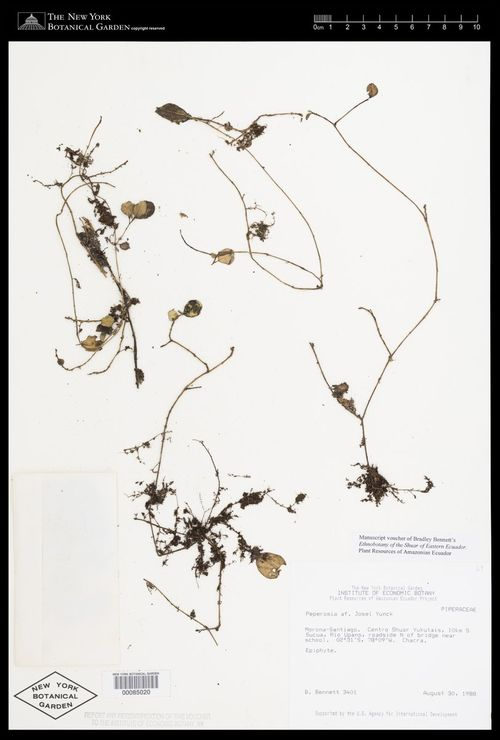

Scientific classification
- Kingdom: Plantae
- Clade: Tracheophytes
- Clade: Angiosperms
- Clade: Magnoliids
- Order: Piperales
- Family: Piperaceae
- Genus: Peperomia
- Species: P. josei

Binomial name
- Peperomia josei Yunck.

= Peperomia josei =

Species of flowering plant

Peperomia josei is a species of epiphyte in the genus Peperomia that is endemic in Colombia and Peru. It grows on wet tropical biomes. Its conservation status is Threatened.

== Description ==
The type specimen was collected in Río Cali Valley, Colombia.

Peperomia josei is a small, fleshy, epiphytic herb branching from the base, with branches decumbent-ascending up to 4–5 cm (1.6–2.0 in) long, loosely covered with crisped hairs, and short internodes. The alternate leaves are elliptic, measuring 5–7 mm wide by 8–10 mm long, with obtuse apex and acute base, crisp-pubescent on both sides but more so above, fringed with fine hairs along the margin, paler and glandular-dotted beneath, obscurely palmately 3-nerved, drying membranous and translucent. The petiole is 2–5 mm long, nearly hairless, clasping and decurrent. The yellow terminal spikes are 1.5 mm thick by 10–15 mm long, on peduncles about 1 cm long that are smooth and hairless. The bracts are round-peltate. The fruit is globose, about 0.75 mm long, with the lower part more or less submerged in the rachis, oblique apex, and subapical stigma.

The small, somewhat erect, somewhat tufted habit with crisp-pubescent surfaces, the tiny elliptic leaves (only 8–10 mm long) with obscure 3-nerved venation, and the short yellow spikes (10–15 mm long) on smooth peduncles about 1 cm long characterize this species.

== Taxonomy and naming ==
It was described in 1950 by Truman G. Yuncker in The Piperaceae of northern South America 2, from specimens collected by José Cuatrecasas. It got its name from the botanist who collected the type specimen, who was José Cuatrecasas.

== Distribution and habitat ==
It is endemic in Colombia and Peru. It grows on a epiphyte environment and is a herb. In Colombia, its elevation range is 2,070–2,260 meters (6,790–7,410 ft). It grows on wet tropical biomes.

== Conservation ==
This species is assessed as Threatened in a preliminary report.
