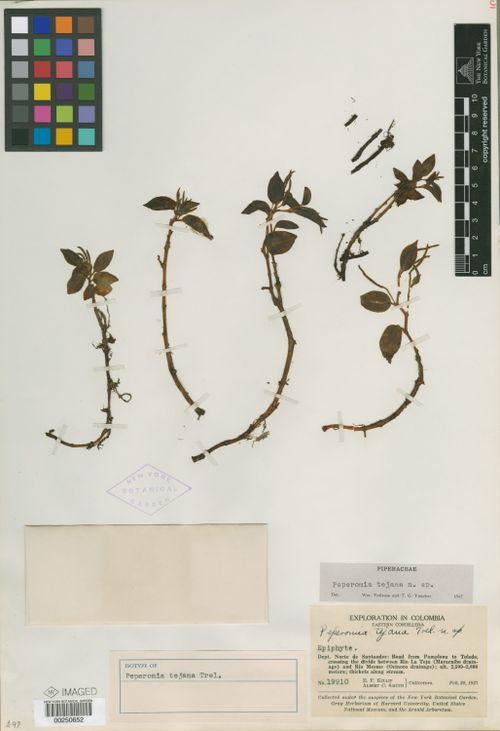

Scientific classification
- Kingdom: Plantae
- Clade: Embryophytes
- Clade: Tracheophytes
- Clade: Angiosperms
- Clade: Magnoliids
- Order: Piperales
- Family: Piperaceae
- Genus: Peperomia
- Species: P. tejana

Binomial name
- Peperomia tejana Trel. & Yunck.

= Peperomia tejana =

Species of epiphyte

Peperomia tejana is a species of epiphyte in the genus Peperomia. It was first described by William Trelease & Truman G. Yuncker and published in the book "The Piperaceae of northern South America 2: 611, f. 535. 1950". It primarily grows on wet tropical biomes. The species name came from Río La Teja, where first specimens of this species were collected.

== Distribution ==
It is endemic to Colombia and Venezuela. First specimens where found at an altitude of 2500–2800 in Río La Teja.

- Colombia
  - Boyacá
  - Cundinamarca
  - Norte de Santander
  - Santander
  - Valle del Cauca
- Venezuela
  - Mérida
  - Táchira
  - Trujillo
  - Zulia
