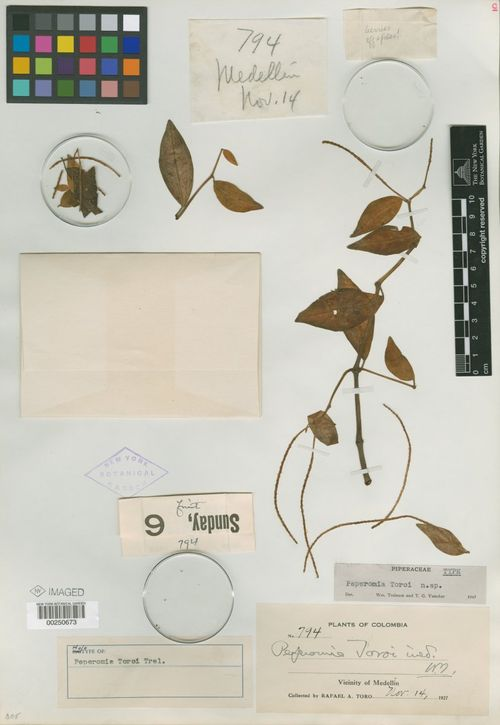

Scientific classification
- Kingdom: Plantae
- Clade: Tracheophytes
- Clade: Angiosperms
- Clade: Magnoliids
- Order: Piperales
- Family: Piperaceae
- Genus: Peperomia
- Species: P. toroi

Binomial name
- Peperomia toroi Trel. & Yunck.

= Peperomia toroi =

Species of flowering plant

Peperomia toroi is a species of epiphyte in the genus Peperomia that is endemic in Colombia. It primarily grows on wet tropical biomes. Its conservation status is Threatened.

== Description ==
The first specimens where collected in Antioquia, Colombia.

Peperomia toroi is a moderately sized herb. Its stems are 3 mm thick with a zigzag above that ascends to 15 cm. The internodes are 3–4 cm long, supappressed-pubescent. The leaves alternate, lance-elliptic, that is 1.5-2.5 cm wide and 3–5 cm long. Its tip is acute. Its base is subacute. It is appressed on both sides or glabrescent except for the nerves. The leaves is a ciliate 5-nerved with the outermost pair being thin. Its petioles is a 5 mm long pubescent crip. It has spikes at the tip. From the upper axils, it is loosely flowered and up to 90 mm long. Its peduncles is a 15 mm long with hairs that are thin. Its bracts are round. Its fruits shape is a spherical that is 1 mm long. Its stigma is subapical.

== Taxonomy and naming ==
It was described in 1950 by Trel. & Yunck. in The Piperaceae of northern South America, from specimens collected by Rafael Andres Toro. It got its name from the botanist who collected the first specimen, who was Rafael Andres Toro.

== Distribution and habitat ==
It is endemic in Colombia. It grows on an epiphyte environment and is a herb. Its elevation range is 1500–1600 meters. It grows on wet tropical biomes.

== Conservation ==
This species is assessed as Threatened, in a preliminary report.
