= Peperomia zarzalana =

Scientific classification
- Kingdom: Plantae
- Clade: Embryophytes
- Clade: Tracheophytes
- Clade: Angiosperms
- Clade: Magnoliids
- Order: Piperales
- Family: Piperaceae
- Genus: Peperomia
- Species: P. zarzalana

Binomial name
- Peperomia zarzalana Trel. & Yunck.

Species of perennial herb

Peperomia zarzalana is a herb species of plant from the genus Peperomia. It was described by William Trelease and Truman G. Yuncker in 1922. In Colombia, its elevation range is about 680-1100 Meters.

== Departments ==
Colombian Department :

1. Antioquia
2. Cundinamarca
3. Huila
4. Norte de Santander
5. Putumayo
6. Santander
7. Tolima
8. Valle del Cauca
