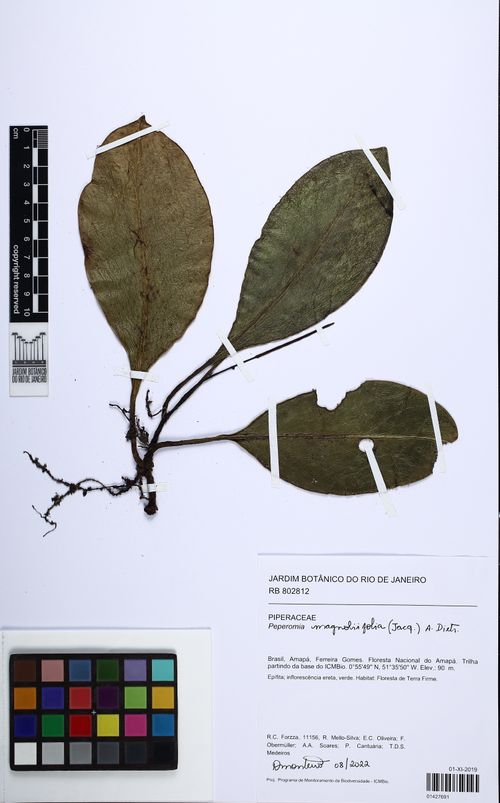

Scientific classification
- Kingdom: Plantae
- Clade: Tracheophytes
- Clade: Angiosperms
- Clade: Magnoliids
- Order: Piperales
- Family: Piperaceae
- Genus: Peperomia
- Species: P. uaupesensis

Binomial name
- Peperomia uaupesensis Yunck.

= Peperomia uaupesensis =

Species of plant

Peperomia uaupesensis is a species of epiphyte from the genus Peperomia. It was first described by Truman G. Yuncker and published in the book "Boletim do Instituto de Botânica (São Paulo) 3: 194–195, f. 171. 1966. (23 Dec 1966)". Its etymology came from "Vaupes".

== Distribution ==
It is endemic to Brazil, Colombia, and Venezuela.
