= Peperomia vareschii =

Scientific classification
- Kingdom: Plantae
- Clade: Embryophytes
- Clade: Tracheophytes
- Clade: Angiosperms
- Clade: Magnoliids
- Order: Piperales
- Family: Piperaceae
- Genus: Peperomia
- Species: P. vareschii

Binomial name
- Peperomia vareschii Yunck.

Species of subshrub

Peperomia vareschii is a species of subshrub in the genus Peperomia. It primarily grows in wet tropical biomes.

== Etymology ==
vareschii came from the full name "Volkmar Vareschi". Volkmar Vareschi is an Austrian ecologist who mainly focuses on lichens and ferns in Venezuela. This refers to his discovery of lichens and ferns in Venezuela.

== Distribution ==
Peperomia vareschii is native to Venezuela.

- Venezuela
  - Trujillo

== See also ==
Volkmar Vareschi
