= Peperomia vallensis =

Scientific classification
- Kingdom: Plantae
- Clade: Embryophytes
- Clade: Tracheophytes
- Clade: Angiosperms
- Clade: Magnoliids
- Order: Piperales
- Family: Piperaceae
- Genus: Peperomia
- Species: P. vallensis

Binomial name
- Peperomia vallensis Trel. & Yunck.

Species of herb

Peperomia vallensis is a species of herb and epiphyte in the Peperomia genus. It mostly grows in wet tropical biomes. Specimens can be at an altitude of 100–2320.

== Etymology ==
vallensis came from the Spanish word for valley.

== Distribution ==
Peperomia vallensis can only be found in 2 countries, Colombia and Ecuador.

- Colombia
  - Antioquia
  - Valle del Cauca
- Ecuador
