= Peperomia yeracuiana =

Scientific classification
- Kingdom: Plantae
- Clade: Tracheophytes
- Clade: Angiosperms
- Clade: Magnoliids
- Order: Piperales
- Family: Piperaceae
- Genus: Peperomia
- Species: P. yeracuiana

Binomial name
- Peperomia yeracuiana Trel. & Yunck.

Species of flowering plant

Peperomia yeracuiana is a species of plant in the family Piperaceae. It was probably discovered in 1950 or 1939, the exact date is unknown. The plant is endemic to Colombia, where it grows at the elevation of 200–275 metres (656–902 ft) in Chocó.
