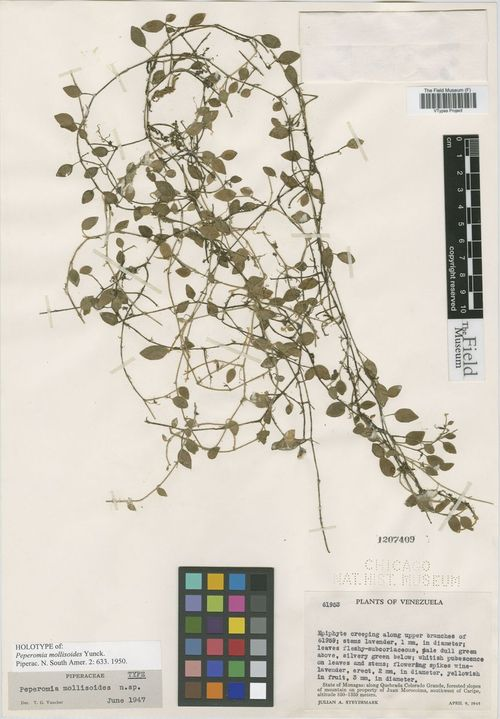

Scientific classification
- Kingdom: Plantae
- Clade: Tracheophytes
- Clade: Angiosperms
- Clade: Magnoliids
- Order: Piperales
- Family: Piperaceae
- Genus: Peperomia
- Species: P. mollisoides

Binomial name
- Peperomia mollisoides Yunck.

= Peperomia mollisoides =

Species of flowering plant

Peperomia mollisoides is a species of epiphyte in the genus Peperomia that is endemic in Colombia. It grows on wet tropical biomes. Its conservation status is Threatened.

== Description ==
The type specimen where collected in Quebrada Colorado Grande, Venezuela, at an altitude of 850–1,350 meters (2,790–4,430 ft).

Peperomia mollisoides is a slender, prostrate epiphyte with a stem lavender when growing, 1 mm thick, with fruiting branches ascending 3–4 cm (1.2–1.6 in). The stem is loosely covered with pale hairs up to 1 mm or more long, with internodes mostly 2–3 cm (0.8–1.2 in) long. The alternate leaves are fleshy and somewhat leathery when growing, pale dull green above and silvery green beneath, elliptic-ovate, measuring 6–9 mm wide by 10–18 mm (0.4–0.7 in) long, with acute apex and base obtuse or somewhat acute. They are palmately 3-nerved, moderately crisp-hairy above and more densely so beneath, fringed with fine hairs along the margin, drying membranous and translucent. The petiole is thread-like, up to 10 mm long and hairy. The terminal spikes are erect, wine-lavender when growing, 2 mm thick by 15 mm long, on peduncles scarcely 5 mm long that are nearly hairless. The bracts are round-peltate. The fruit is globose, about 0.6 mm long, glandular-warty, abruptly obliquely pointed, with subapical stigma.

The slender, prostrate habit with lavender-colored growing stems, the proportionally longer elliptic-ovate leaves (10–18 mm long) on longer thread-like petioles (up to 10 mm), and the shorter, more densely flowered wine-lavender spikes (only 15 mm long on very short peduncles) characterize this species. It resembles P. mollis, from which it differs in these proportional features of leaves, petioles, and spike structure.

== Taxonomy and naming ==
It was described in 1950 by Truman G. Yuncker in The Piperaceae of northern South America 2, from specimens collected by Julian Alfred Steyermark. It got its name from the description of the species, which resembles P. mollis.

== Distribution and habitat ==
It is endemic in Venezuela. It grows on a epiphyte environment and is a herb. It grows on wet tropical biomes.

== Conservation ==
This species is assessed as Threatened, in a preliminary report.
