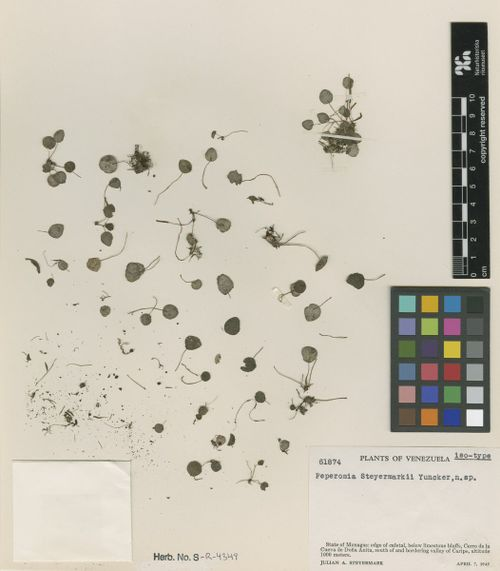

Scientific classification
- Kingdom: Plantae
- Clade: Embryophytes
- Clade: Tracheophytes
- Clade: Spermatophytes
- Clade: Angiosperms
- Clade: Magnoliids
- Order: Piperales
- Family: Piperaceae
- Genus: Peperomia
- Species: P. steyermarkii

Binomial name
- Peperomia steyermarkii Yunck.

= Peperomia steyermarkii =

Species of flowering plant

Peperomia steyermarkii is a species of lithophyte in the genus Peperomia that is endemic in Venezuela. It grows on wet tropical biomes. Its conservation status is Threatened.

== Description ==
The first specimens where collected in Monagas, Venezuela.

Peperomia steyermarkii is a tiny, delicate herb that grows in compact tufts, reaching only 3–4 mm in thickness on its tuber-like stem. It features fleshy, almost translucent leaves that are round and shield-shaped, measuring just 8–10 mm across. The leaves attach to the stem 2–4 mm in from the margin, and each bears a distinctive pale green spot at the center where five, interconnecting veins radiate outward. The upper surface is deep green with purplish suffusion around that central spot, while the underside appears silvery pale green or tinged with soft lavender. The thread-like leaf stalks are exceptionally slender, stretching up to 3.5 cm long and appearing pale greenish-white when fresh. The narrow, flower spikes are 1 mm thick and 15–20 mm long when dry, carried on stalks 2–2.5 cm long that often blush an attractive rose-lilac color during growth; occasionally a small leaf appears about 1 cm below the spike. The bracts are round and shield-shaped. The plant bears small, warty black fruits shaped like globes, about 0.8 mm long, each topped with a short, awl-shaped style and an apical stigma.

The combination of its extremely small size, the characteristic pale central spot on the leaves with radiating veins, the subtranslucent quality of the foliage, and the distinctive rose-lilac coloration of the flowering stalks set it apart from other Peperomia species.

== Taxonomy and naming ==
It was described in 1951 by Truman G. Yuncker in Fieldiana, Botany, from specimens collected by Julian Alfred Steyermark. It got its name from botanist who collected the first specimen, who was Julian Alfred Steyermark.

== Distribution and habitat ==
It is endemic in Venezuela. It grows on a epiphyte environment and is a herb. It grows on wet tropical biomes.

== Conservation ==
This species is assessed as Threatened, in a preliminary report.
