= Peperomia wibomii =

Conservation status
- Endangered (IUCN 3.1)

Scientific classification
- Kingdom: Plantae
- Clade: Tracheophytes
- Clade: Angiosperms
- Clade: Magnoliids
- Order: Piperales
- Family: Piperaceae
- Genus: Peperomia
- Species: P. wibomii

Binomial name
- Peperomia wibomii Yunck., 1956

Species of flowering plant

Peperomia wibomii is a species of plant in the family Piperaceae. A member of the genus Peperomia, it is endemic to Ecuador, where it can be found in humid coastal forests (up to 500 meters in elevation).
