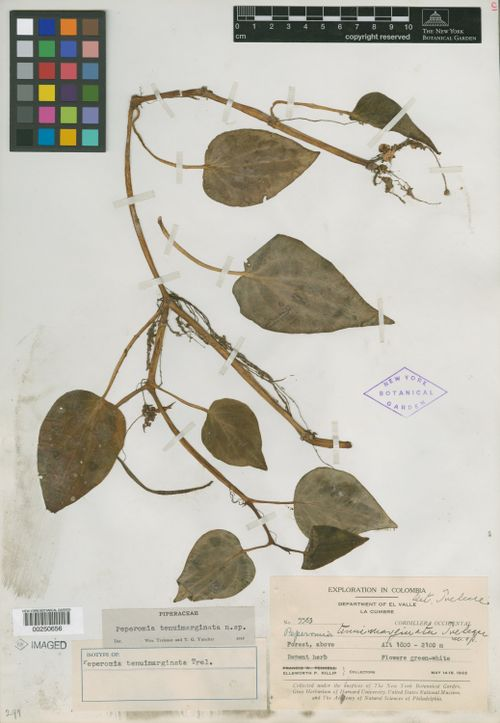

Scientific classification
- Kingdom: Plantae
- Clade: Tracheophytes
- Clade: Angiosperms
- Clade: Magnoliids
- Order: Piperales
- Family: Piperaceae
- Genus: Peperomia
- Species: P. tenuimarginata

Binomial name
- Peperomia tenuimarginata Trel. & Yunck.

= Peperomia tenuimarginata =

Species of flowering plant

Peperomia tenuimarginata is a species of flowering plant in the genus Peperomia endemic in Colombia. It primarily grows on wet tropical biomes. Its conservation status is Threatened.

== Taxonomy and naming ==
It was described in 1950 by William Trelease and Yunck. in The Piperaceae of northern South America, from specimens collected by Ellsworth Paine Killip. It got its name from the description of the leaves.

== Distribution and habitat ==
The first specimens where collected in Colombia. It is endemic in Colombia, specifically Antioquia and Valle del Cauca. Its elevation range is 900–2400 meters. It grows on wet tropical biomes.

== Conservation ==
This species is assessed as Threatened, in a preliminary report.
