= Primary vein =

Leaf anatomy

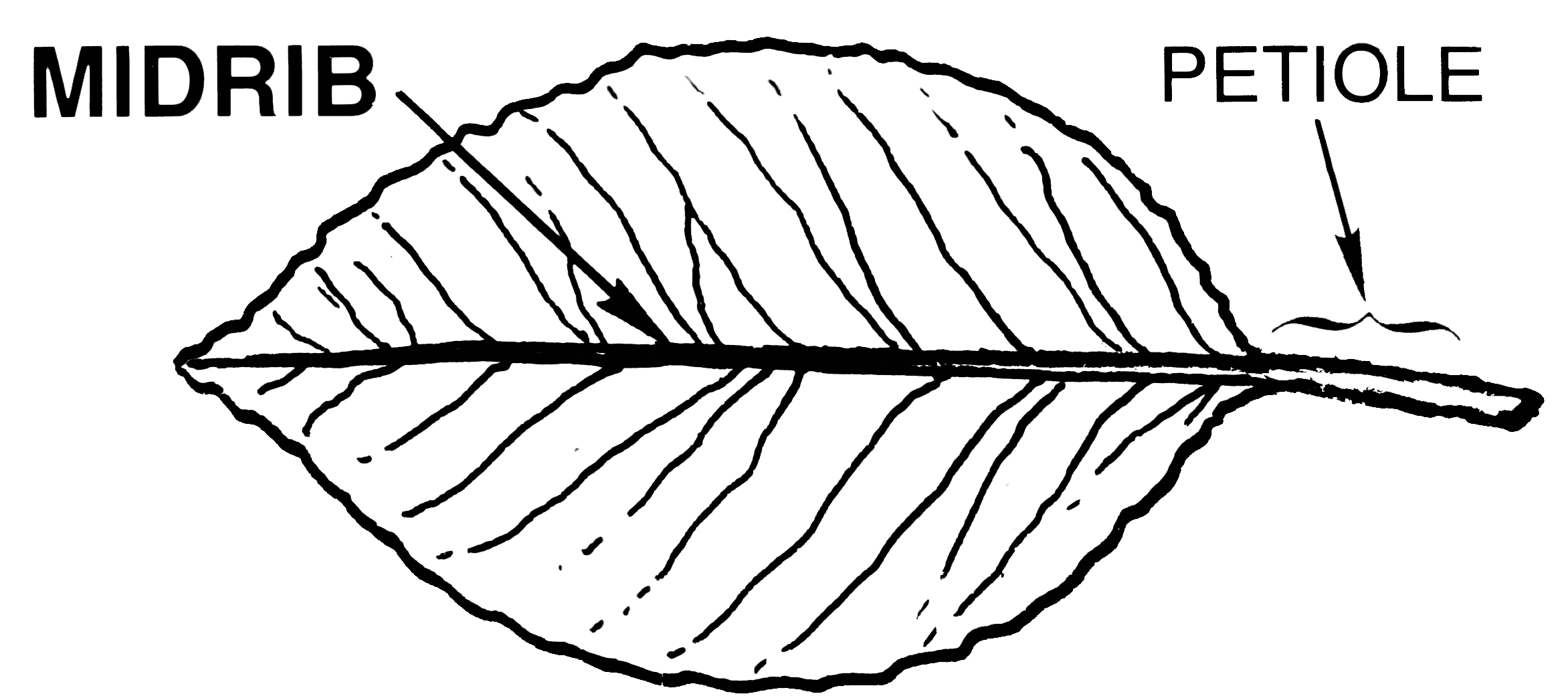
Sketch showing the midrib of a leaf

A primary vein, also known as the midrib, is the main vascular structure running through the center of a leaf. The primary vein is crucial for the leaf’s efficiency in photosynthesis and overall health, as it ensures the proper flow of materials and structural integrity.

It serves several critical functions, including structural support, as the primary vein helps the leaf maintain its shape and structure; food and water transportation, as it contains xylem and phloem tissues that transport water, minerals, and nutrients to and from the leaf; and connection to the stem, as it links the leaf to its vascular system, facilitating the exchange of materials between the leaf and the rest of the plant. From the primary vein, secondary and tertiary veins branch out, forming a network that distributes resources throughout the leaf.

The arrangement of veins, including the primary vein, varies among plants. Reticulate venation occurs in dicots, where the primary vein branches into a network; parallel venation is found in monocots, where multiple veins run parallel to each other.
