= Truman G. Yuncker =

American taxonomic botanist

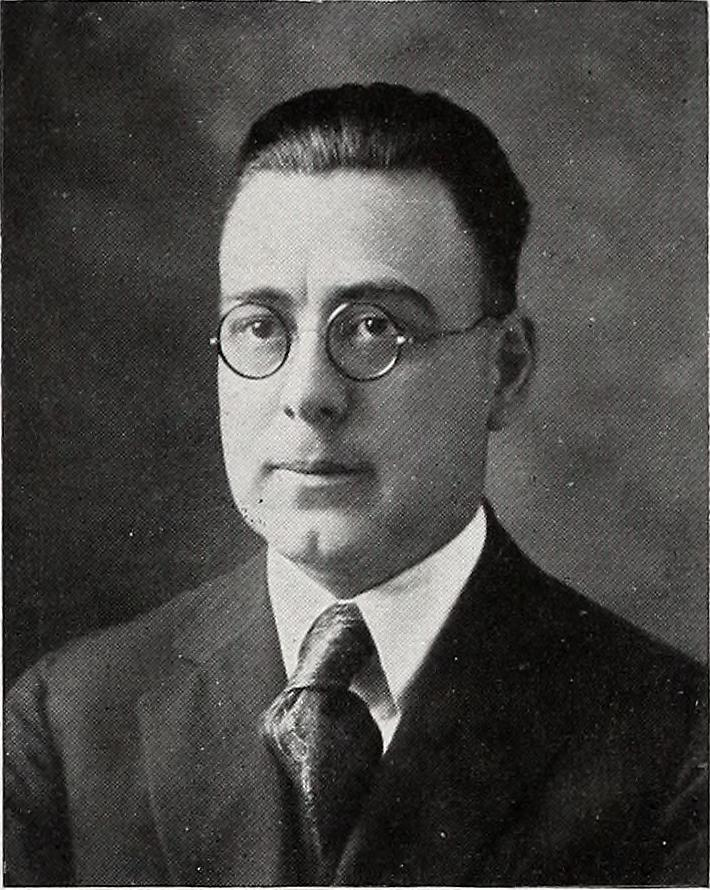
Yuncker circa 1920s

Truman George Yuncker (March 20, 1891 – January 8, 1964) was a taxonomic botanist best known for his work in the family Piperaceae.

== Biography ==
Graves of Ethel and Truman Yuncker at Mount Evergreen Cemetery

Yuncker first taught at Manual High School in Indianapolis, Indiana. After service in World War I, he received his doctorate from the University of Illinois in 1919. Soon after, he became a faculty member at DePauw University and became head of the botany and bacteriology department in 1921 and held that post until retirement in 1956. During his tenure he described 839 new species, 211 new varieties and 25 new formae in the Piperaceae. He wrote the treatment of that family in almost every regional flora published during his lifetime. His early studies were on the genus Cuscuta, in which he described 67 new species and 39 new varieties.

Yuncker acquired an impressive collection of plant samples which became an herbarium maintained by DePauw. DePauw sold the collection to the New York Botanical Garden in 1987.

Yuncker died in Greencastle, Indiana on January 8, 1964, and was buried at Mount Evergreen Cemetery in Jackson, Michigan.
