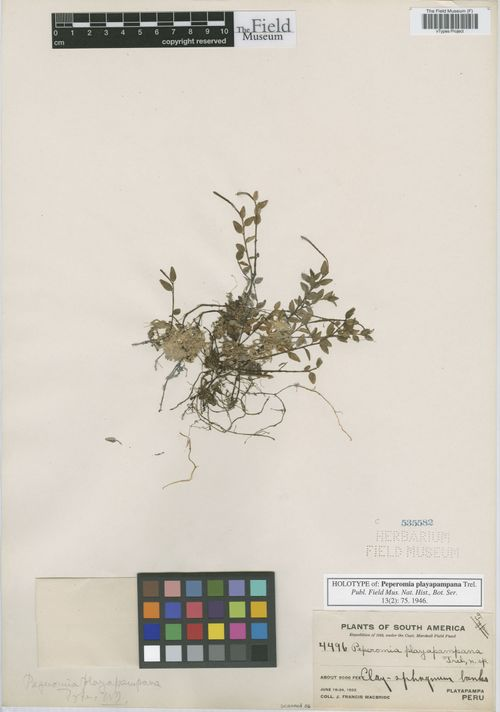

Scientific classification
- Kingdom: Plantae
- Clade: Tracheophytes
- Clade: Angiosperms
- Clade: Magnoliids
- Order: Piperales
- Family: Piperaceae
- Genus: Peperomia
- Species: P. playapampana

Binomial name
- Peperomia playapampana Trel.

= Peperomia playapampana =

Species of plant

Peperomia playapampana is a species of terrestrial or epiphytic herb in the genus Peperomia that is native to Peru. It grows on wet tropical biomes. Its conservation status is Threatened.

== Description ==
The type specimen were collected at Playapampa, Peru at na altitude of 2700 meters above sea level.

Peperomia playapampana is a small, glabrate herb with a filiform, stoloniferous-ascending, more or less tufted stem. The alternate leaves are oblong to oblong-ovate, with a slightly attenuated, obtuse to obscurely emarginate apex and a rounded base. They are small, measuring 8–10 mm long and 3–5 mm wide, 1-nerved, and have a few scattered, soft, transient hairs on both surfaces (especially toward the apex), with a pale granular underside. The very short petiole is about 1 mm long. The small terminal spikes are 20 mm long and 1 mm thick, becoming loosely flowered when mature, and are borne on a filiform peduncle 5–10 mm long. The sessile berries are ovoid and somewhat mucronate, with an apical stigma.

== Taxonomy and naming ==
It was described in 1936 by William Trelease in Publications of the Field Museum of Natural History, Botanical Series 13, from specimens collected by James Francis Macbride.

The epithet playapampana is derived from the type locality.

== Distribution and habitat ==
It is native to Peru. It grows as a terrestrial or epiphytic herb. It grows on wet tropical biomes.

== Conservation ==
This species is assessed as Threatened, in a preliminary report.
