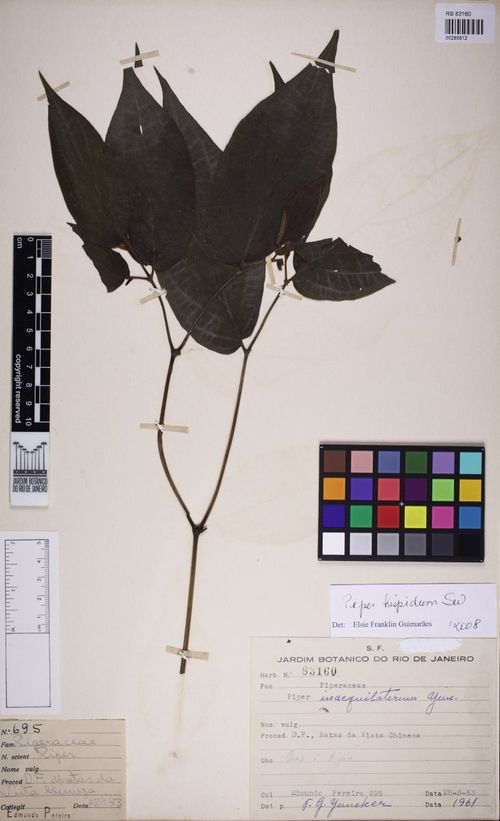

Scientific classification
- Kingdom: Plantae
- Clade: Tracheophytes
- Clade: Angiosperms
- Clade: Magnoliids
- Order: Piperales
- Family: Piperaceae
- Genus: Peperomia
- Species: P. inaequilatera

Binomial name
- Peperomia inaequilatera Trel.

= Peperomia inaequilatera =

Species of plant

Peperomia inaequilatera is a species of terrestrial or epiphytic herb in the genus Peperomia that is native to Peru. It grows on wet tropical biomes. Its conservation status is Threatened.

== Description ==
The type specimen were collected at Río Santo Domingo, Peru at an altitude of 1500 meters above sea level.

Peperomia inaequilatera is a moderately small (perhaps creeping), ascending, densely puberulous herb with a somewhat slender stem 2–3 mm thick and short internodes. The leaves are typically in whorls of 3 at the nodes. They are elliptic-oblong, somewhat acute to obtuse at both ends, and small, about 2 cm long and 1 cm wide. Leaves on sterile branchlets are larger, reaching 4.5 cm long and 2 cm wide, or even much larger (7 cm long, 2.5 cm wide) and rhombic-oblanceolate. A distinctive feature is that one side of the leaf base decurrent onto the petiole about 3 mm further than the other side. The leaves are thin and pellucid when dry, 5-nerved with a more or less branched midrib. The short petiole is barely 5 mm long. The terminal spikes are 60 mm long and 1 mm thick, with loosely arranged flowers in whorls, and are borne on a 1 cm peduncle that is puberulous like the rachis. The ovary is ovoid with a subapical stigma.

== Taxonomy and naming ==
It was described in 1936 by William Trelease in Publications of the Field Museum of Natural History, Botanical Series 13, from specimens collected by James Francis Macbride.

The epithet is derived from the Latin meaning "unequal-sided," referring to the distinctive asymmetrical leaf base where one side decurrent further than the other.

== Distribution and habitat ==
It is native to Peru. It grows as a terrestrial or epiphytic herb. It grows on wet tropical biomes.

== Conservation ==
This species is assessed as Threatened, in a preliminary report.
