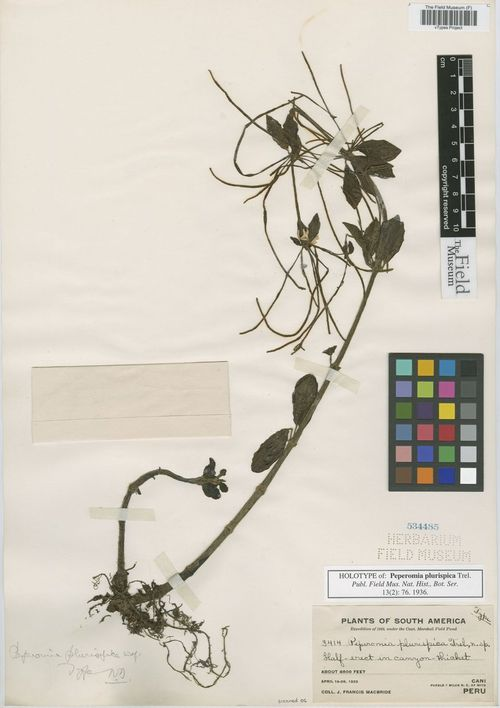

Scientific classification
- Kingdom: Plantae
- Clade: Tracheophytes
- Clade: Angiosperms
- Clade: Magnoliids
- Order: Piperales
- Family: Piperaceae
- Genus: Peperomia
- Species: P. plurispica

Binomial name
- Peperomia plurispica Trel.

= Peperomia plurispica =

Species of plant

Peperomia plurispica is a species of terrestrial or epiphytic herb in the genus Peperomia that is native to Peru. It grows on wet tropical biomes. Its conservation status is threatened.

== Description ==
The type specimen were collected at Cani, Peru at an altitude of 2550 meters above sea level.

Peperomia plurispica is a medium-sized, stoloniferous, ascending herb with a stem 2–3 mm thick (much thicker at the base), covered in crisp pilose hairs. The leaves are typically in whorls of 4–5 at the nodes. They are elliptic-oblong, somewhat acute at both ends, and somewhat small, measuring 15–30 mm long and 5–10 mm wide. They are glabrate above, crisp-pilose along the nerves beneath, and have more or less conspicuous black punctulations. The short, crisp-pilose petiole is 2–3 mm long. The terminal and axillary spikes are filiform, reaching 100 mm or more in length and 1 mm in thickness, with loosely arranged flowers, and are borne on an appressed-villous peduncle 2.5 cm long. The immersed ovaries are ovoid with a subapical stigma.

== Taxonomy and naming ==
It was described in 1936 by William Trelease in Publications of the Field Museum of Natural History, Botanical Series 13, from specimens collected by James Francis Macbride.

The epithet combines the Latin pluri- and spica, meaning "many-spiked," referring to the numerous spikes produced by this species.

== Distribution and habitat ==
It is native to Peru. It grows as a terrestrial or epiphytic herb. It grows on wet tropical biomes.

== Conservation ==
This species has been assessed as threatened in a preliminary report.
