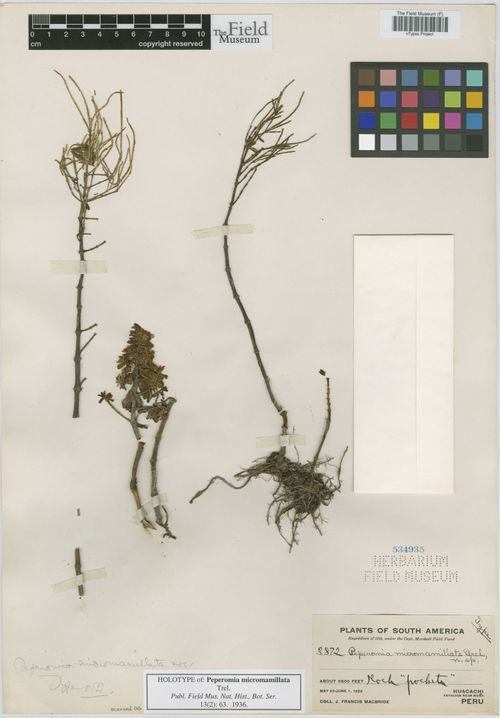

Scientific classification
- Kingdom: Plantae
- Clade: Tracheophytes
- Clade: Angiosperms
- Clade: Magnoliids
- Order: Piperales
- Family: Piperaceae
- Genus: Peperomia
- Species: P. micromamillata

Binomial name
- Peperomia micromamillata Trel.

= Peperomia micromamillata =

Species of plant

Peperomia micromamillata is a species of terrestrial or epiphytic herb in the genus Peperomia that is native to Peru. It grows on wet tropical biomes. Its conservation status is Threatened.

== Description ==
The type specimen were collected at Muña, Peru at an altitude of 1950 meters above sea level.

Peperomia micromamillata is a somewhat small, tufted, succulent herb that turns brown when dry. The stem is 1–3 mm thick with short internodes that are initially velvety but quickly become exfoliated and scurfy. The leaves are crowded in whorls of about 6 at the nodes. They are elliptic, somewhat obtuse at both ends, small (8 mm long, 3 mm wide), very fleshy, opaque, and 1-nerved. The underside is covered in microscopic mamilate projections, and the apex is ciliate-bearded. The very short petiole is barely 1 mm long. The (apparently terminal) spikes are 60 mm long and 1 mm thick, with loosely arranged flowers, and are borne on a peduncle scarcely 10 mm long. The ovaries are ovoid with a subapical stigma.

== Taxonomy and naming ==
It was described in 1936 by William Trelease in Publications of the Field Museum of Natural History, Botanical Series 13, from specimens collected by James Francis Macbride.

The epithet is derived from the Greek mikros and the Latin mamillata, referring to the tiny, breast-like structures on the underside of the leaves.

== Distribution and habitat ==
It is native to Peru. It grows as a terrestrial or epiphytic herb. It grows on wet tropical biomes.

== Conservation ==
This species is assessed as Threatened, in a preliminary report.
