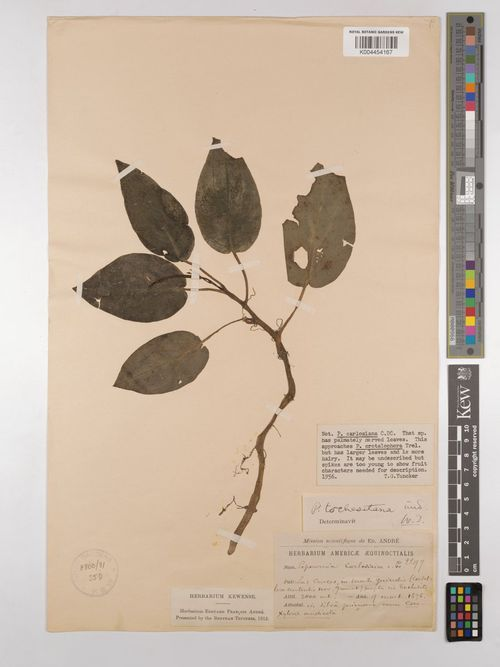

Scientific classification
- Kingdom: Plantae
- Clade: Tracheophytes
- Clade: Angiosperms
- Clade: Magnoliids
- Order: Piperales
- Family: Piperaceae
- Genus: Peperomia
- Species: P. crotalophora

Binomial name
- Peperomia crotalophora Trel.

Synonyms
- Peperomia semielongata Trel.

= Peperomia crotalophora =

Species of flowering plant

Peperomia crotalophora is a species of epiphyte in the genus Peperomia that is endemic in Colombia and Peru. It grows on wet tropical biomes. Its conservation status is Not Threatened.

== Description ==
The type specimen were collected near Hacienda Schunke, Peru, at an altitude of 1,200 meters (3,900 ft).

Peperomia crotalophora is a moderately tall, procumbent, glabrous herb that dries to a green color. The somewhat slender stem is 2–3 mm thick with elongated internodes. The alternate leaves are rounded-ovate to almost triangular-ovate, acute or occasionally obtuse or shortly acuminate, and medium-sized (5.5–6.5 cm long, 4.5 cm wide). They have multiple pinnate nerves: 4 basal nerves and 2 additional pairs arising from the lower quarter of the midrib. The petiole ranges from 3 cm to as long as 10 cm 10 cm (3.9 in). The terminal spikes are solitary, terminating 2 cm long, single-bracteate peduncles. They are 50–70 mm long and 1 mm thick, with flowers tightly arranged in whorls. The whorls of large anthers are densely clustered and very conspicuous in the young state. The round-peltate bracts are obscure and arranged in pseudowhorls of about 12.

== Taxonomy and naming ==
It was described in 1936 by William Trelease in Publications of the Field Museum of Natural History, Botanical Series 13, from specimens collected by James Francis Macbride. It got its epithet from the Greek krotalon + phoros, meaning "rattle-bearing", referring to the rattle-like appearance of the densely whorled flowers with their conspicuous anthers.

== Distribution and habitat ==
It is endemic in Colombia and Peru. It grows on a epiphyte environment and is a herb. It grows on wet tropical biomes.

== Conservation ==
This species is assessed as Not Threatened, in a preliminary report.
