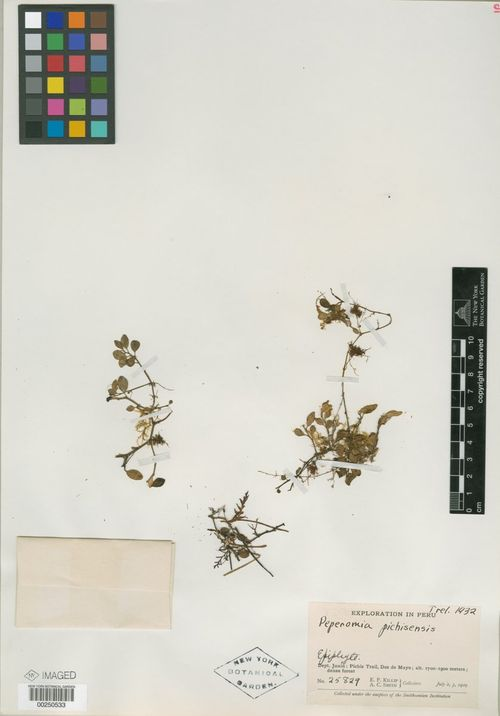

Scientific classification
- Kingdom: Plantae
- Clade: Tracheophytes
- Clade: Angiosperms
- Clade: Magnoliids
- Order: Piperales
- Family: Piperaceae
- Genus: Peperomia
- Species: P. pichisensis

Binomial name
- Peperomia pichisensis Trel.

= Peperomia pichisensis =

Species of plant

Peperomia pichisensis is a species of terrestrial or epiphytic herb in the genus Peperomia that is native to Peru. It grows on wet tropical biomes. Its conservation status is Threatened.

== Description ==
The type specimen were collected at Pichis Trail, Peru at an altitude of 2550 meters above sea level.

Peperomia pichisensis is a small, creeping, epiphytic herb with erect branches and a slender stem covered in minute, soft villous hairs. The alternate leaves are rounded, round-obovate, or elliptic, obtuse, with an acute base, measuring 5–14 mm long and 5–7 mm wide. They are crisp-subvillous above, obscurely 3-nerved. The glabrous petiole is 3–5 mm long. The terminal spikes are 30–40 mm long and 1 mm thick, with a very short peduncle.

== Taxonomy and naming ==
It was described in 1936 by William Trelease in Publications of the Field Museum of Natural History, Botanical Series 13, from specimens collected by James Francis Macbride.

The epithet pichisensis is derived from the type locality.

== Distribution and habitat ==
It is native to Peru. It grows as a terrestrial or epiphytic herb. It grows on wet tropical biomes.

== Conservation ==
This species is assessed as Threatened, in a preliminary report.
