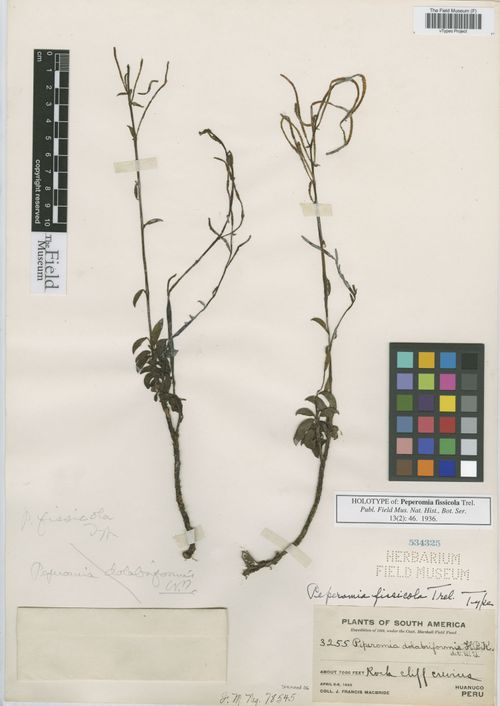

Scientific classification
- Kingdom: Plantae
- Clade: Tracheophytes
- Clade: Angiosperms
- Clade: Magnoliids
- Order: Piperales
- Family: Piperaceae
- Genus: Peperomia
- Species: P. fissicola

Binomial name
- Peperomia fissicola Trel.

= Peperomia fissicola =

Species of flowering plant

Peperomia fissicola is a species of lithophyte in the genus Peperomia that is endemic in Peru. It grows on wet tropical biomes. Its conservation status is Threatened.

== Description ==
The type specimen were collected near Huánuco, Peru, at an altitude of 2,100 meters (6,900 ft).

Peperomia fissicola is a moderately tall, glabrous herb that grows quickly erect from rock crevices. The firm stem is about 3 mm thick. The alternate leaves are clustered at the stem apex, recurved, and axe-shaped, pointed at both ends, measuring 15 mm long and 5 mm wide. The petiole is scarcely 5 mm long. The spikes are paniculate, terminating a rather long, slender, few-leaved prolongation of the stem. They are 50 mm long and 1 mm thick, with peduncles about 5 mm long.

== Taxonomy and naming ==
It was described in 1936 by William Trelease in Publications of the Field Museum of Natural History, Botanical Series 13, from specimens collected by James Francis Macbride. It got its epithet from the Latin fissura + colo, referring to its habitat growing in rock fissures.

== Distribution and habitat ==
It is endemic in Peru. It grows on a lithophyte environment and is a herb. It grows on wet tropical biomes.

== Conservation ==
This species is assessed as Threatened, in a preliminary report.
