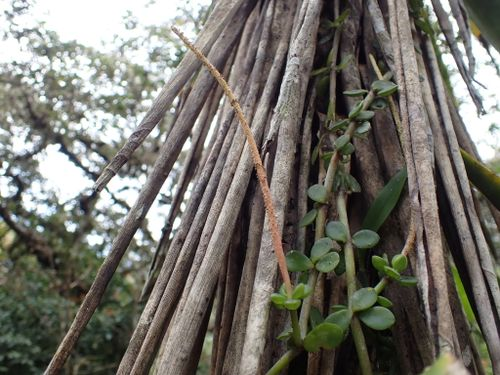

Scientific classification
- Kingdom: Plantae
- Clade: Tracheophytes
- Clade: Angiosperms
- Clade: Magnoliids
- Order: Piperales
- Family: Piperaceae
- Genus: Peperomia
- Species: P. cerea

Binomial name
- Peperomia cerea Trel.

= Peperomia cerea =

Species of flowering plant

Peperomia cerea is a species of epiphyte in the genus Peperomia that is endemic in Peru. It grows on wet tropical biomes. Its conservation status is Threatened.

== Description ==
The type specimen were collected near Mito, Peru, at an altitude of 2,700 meters (8,900 ft).

Peperomia cerea is a moderately tall, succulent, completely glabrous herb that hangs from rocks. Its stout stem is 5 mm thick near the base, becoming more slender upward. The leaves are opposite, or in whorls of 3–5 on the upper stem. They are rounded-elliptic with rounded ends, about 15 mm long and 10 mm wide, though upper leaves can be more oblong and smaller (barely 10 x 7 mm). The thin margin is more or less revolute. When dry, the leaves have a distinctive waxy-translucent appearance and are 1-nerved. The short petiole is 1–3 mm long. The terminal spikes are over 100 mm (3.9 in) long and 3–4 mm thick, and are described as being dark red. The flowers are somewhat loosely inserted on the thick, 15 mm peduncle. The ovaries are immersed in the rachis, acuminate, and have a subapical stigma.

== Taxonomy and naming ==
It was described in 1936 by William Trelease in Publications of the Field Museum of Natural History, Botanical Series 13, from specimens collected by James Francis Macbride. It got its name from the description of the type specimen.

== Distribution and habitat ==
It is endemic in Peru. It grows on a epiphyte environment and is a herb. It grows on wet tropical biomes.

== Conservation ==
This species is assessed as Threatened, in a preliminary report.
