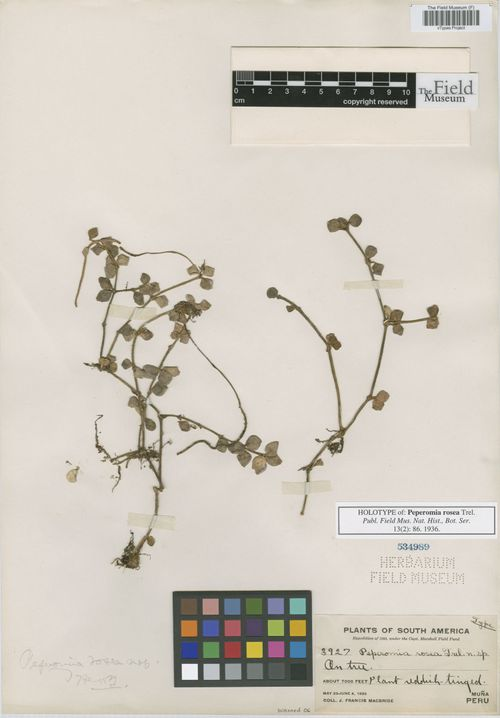

Scientific classification
- Kingdom: Plantae
- Clade: Tracheophytes
- Clade: Angiosperms
- Clade: Magnoliids
- Order: Piperales
- Family: Piperaceae
- Genus: Peperomia
- Species: P. rosea

Binomial name
- Peperomia rosea Trel.

= Peperomia rosea =

Species of flowering plant

Peperomia rosea is a species of epiphyte in the genus Peperomia that is endemic in Peru. It grows on wet tropical biomes. Its conservation status is Threatened.

== Description ==
The type specimen were collected near Munã, Peru at an altitude of 2100 meters.

Peperomia rosea is a somewhat small, diffuse, red-tinged, tree-dwelling herb with a somewhat slender stem 2 mm thick, covered in dirty hirsute or crisp pilose hairs. The leaves are typically in whorls of 3–5 at the nodes. They are rounded to round-elliptic, revolute, loosely hirsute beneath and above near the base, small, measuring 9–10 mm long and 5–10 mm wide, and are leathery with no visible nerves. The petiole is barely 1 mm long. The terminal and axillary spikes are 80 mm long and 1 mm thick, somewhat densely flowered, with a somewhat loosely pilose peduncle 2 cm long. The berries are ovoid, pointed, and bear pseudocupulae, with an apical stigma.

== Taxonomy and naming ==
It was described in 1936 by William Trelease in Publications of the Field Museum of Natural History, Botanical Series 13, from specimens collected by James Francis Macbride. The epithet rosea is Latin for "rosy" or "pink," referring to the reddish-pink tinge of the plant.

== Distribution and habitat ==
It is endemic in Peru. It grows on a epiphyte environment and is a herb. It grows on wet tropical biomes.

== Conservation ==
Its conservation status is Threatened.
