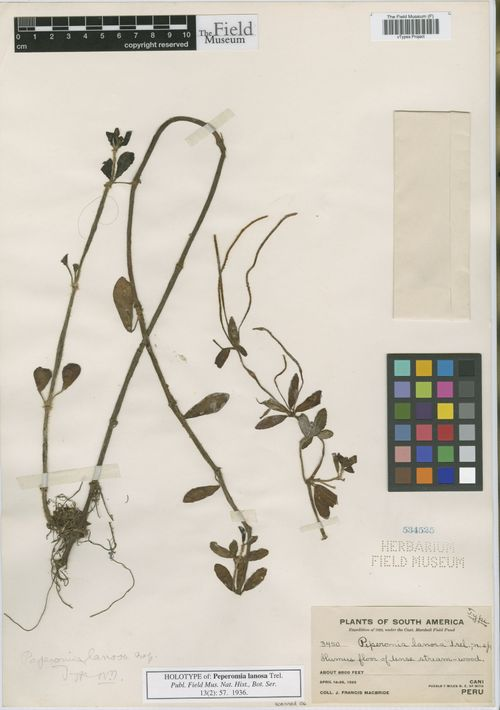

Scientific classification
- Kingdom: Plantae
- Clade: Tracheophytes
- Clade: Angiosperms
- Clade: Magnoliids
- Order: Piperales
- Family: Piperaceae
- Genus: Peperomia
- Species: P. lanosa

Binomial name
- Peperomia lanosa Trel.

= Peperomia lanosa =

Species of plant

Peperomia lanosa is a species of terrestrial or epiphytic herb in the genus Peperomia that is native to Peru. It grows on wet tropical biomes. Its conservation status is Threatened.

== Description ==
The type specimen were collected at near Cani, Peru at an altitude of 2550 meters above sea level.

Peperomia lanosa is a moderately tall, rather slender, stoloniferous-erect herb. The stem is 1–3 mm thick with rather long internodes densely covered in long, soft hairs. The lower leaves are opposite, obovate-cuneate, 2 cm long and 1.5 cm wide, with long petioles (about 1 cm). The upper leaves are typically in whorls of 3–5 at the nodes, spathulate to somewhat oblong, with shorter petioles. They measure 3 cm long and 1 cm wide, or sometimes only 2 cm long and 6 mm wide. All leaves are 3-nerved and have appressed hairs on both surfaces (or at least along the nerves above). The densely pilose petiole is 1 cm long on lower leaves, shorter above. The terminal and axillary spikes are 40–70 mm long and 1 mm thick, with loosely arranged flowers, and are borne on a pilose peduncle 1.5–2 cm long. The berries are ovoid and mucronate, with an oblique, apical stigma.

== Taxonomy and naming ==
It was described in 1936 by William Trelease in Publications of the Field Museum of Natural History, Botanical Series 13, from specimens collected by James Francis Macbride.

The epithet is derived from the Latin for "woolly," referring to the dense, long, soft hairs covering the stems and other parts of the plant.

== Distribution and habitat ==
It is native to Peru. It grows as a terrestrial or epiphytic herb. It grows on wet tropical biomes.

== Conservation ==
This species is assessed as Threatened, in a preliminary report.
