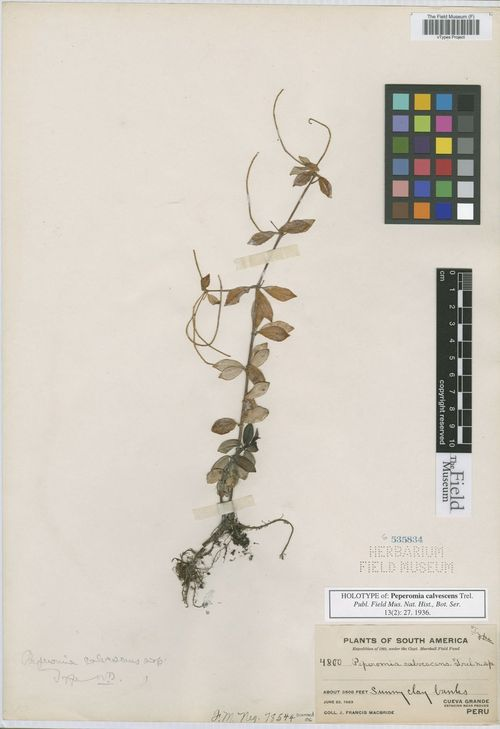

Scientific classification
- Kingdom: Plantae
- Clade: Tracheophytes
- Clade: Angiosperms
- Clade: Magnoliids
- Order: Piperales
- Family: Piperaceae
- Genus: Peperomia
- Species: P. calvescens

Binomial name
- Peperomia calvescens Trel.

= Peperomia calvescens =

Species of flowering plant

Peperomia calvescens is a species of epiphyte in the genus Peperomia that is endemic in Peru. It grows on wet tropical biomes. Its conservation status is Threatened.

== Description ==
The type specimen were collected near Cueva Grande, Peru, at an altitude of 1,050 meters (3,440 ft).

Peperomia calvescens is a small, succulent, stoloniferous herb with stems that are somewhat cespitose. The erect, slender stems are about 2 mm thick. When young, they are sparsely covered in soft hairs, but they quickly become glabrescent as the epidermis exfoliates in a scurfy layer, though hairs may persist at the nodes. The leaves are in whorls of 3–4 and are lanceolate-elliptic, pointed at both ends, and 3-nerved. They are small, about 16 mm long and 8 mm wide. The upper surface has persistent crisp hairs along the nerves, while the lower surface is hairless and appears whitish due to the exfoliating epidermis. The glabrous petiole is short, only about 2 mm long. The terminal spikes are 60 mm long and 1 mm thick, with loosely inserted flowers, and are borne on a slender, glabrous peduncle just 2 mm long. The rachis bears short pseudopedicels. The ovary is ovoid and appears impressed into the rachis, with a subapical stigma.

== Taxonomy and naming ==
It was described in 1936 by William Trelease in Publications of the Field Museum of Natural History, Botanical Series 13, from specimens collected by James Francis Macbride. It got its name from the description of the type specimen.

== Distribution and habitat ==
It is endemic in Peru. It grows on a epiphyte environment and is a herb. It grows on wet tropical biomes.

== Conservation ==
This species is assessed as Threatened, in a preliminary report.
