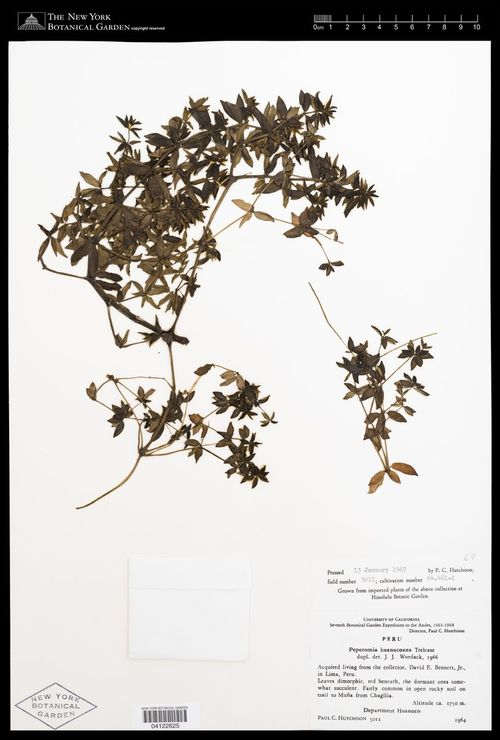

Scientific classification
- Kingdom: Plantae
- Clade: Tracheophytes
- Clade: Angiosperms
- Clade: Magnoliids
- Order: Piperales
- Family: Piperaceae
- Genus: Peperomia
- Species: P. huanucoana

Binomial name
- Peperomia huanucoana Trel.

= Peperomia huanucoana =

Species of flowering plant

Peperomia huanucoana is a species of epiphytic herb in the genus Peperomia that is native to Peru. It grows on wet tropical biomes. Its conservation status is Threatened.

== Description ==
The type specimen were collected at Huánuco, Peru.

Peperomia huanucoana is a moderately small, ascending, branching herb with a slender stem 1–2 mm thick, densely covered in papillose-puberulous hairs. The leaves are typically in whorls of 3–4 at the nodes, spreading or reflexed. They are ovate-elliptic to oblong-elliptic, obtuse at both ends, and sessile or nearly so. They are small, 10–20 mm long and 5–6 mm wide, papillose-puberulous on both surfaces, rather thin, and narrowly 3-nerved with a more or less branched midrib. The spikes are terminal and axillary, 40 mm long and 1 mm thick, with loosely arranged flowers, and are borne on a scarcely 10 mm long, papillose-puberulous peduncle. The ovary is ovoid and impressed, with a subapical stigma. On stolons, the foliage is very different: leaves overlapping, round-elliptic, thick, revolute, and scarcely more than 5 mm long and 4 mm wide.

== Taxonomy and naming ==
It was described in 1936 by William Trelease in Publications of the Field Museum of Natural History, Botanical Series 13, from specimens collected by James Francis Macbride. The epithet is derived from the type locality, Huánuco in Peru, where this species was first collected.

== Distribution and habitat ==
It is native to Peru. It grows as an epiphytic herb. It grows on wet tropical biomes.

== Conservation ==
This species is assessed as Threatened, in a preliminary report.
