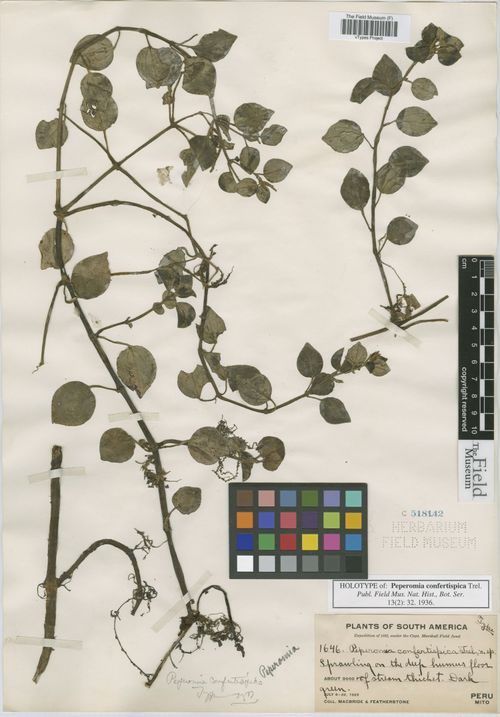

Scientific classification
- Kingdom: Plantae
- Clade: Tracheophytes
- Clade: Angiosperms
- Clade: Magnoliids
- Order: Piperales
- Family: Piperaceae
- Genus: Peperomia
- Species: P. confertispica

Binomial name
- Peperomia confertispica Trel.

= Peperomia confertispica =

Species of flowering plant

Peperomia confertispica is a species of epiphyte in the genus Peperomia that is endemic in Peru. It grows on wet tropical biomes. Its conservation status is Threatened.

== Description ==
The type specimen were collected near Mito, Peru, at an altitude of 2,700 meters (8,900 ft).

Peperomia confertispica is a moderately small, procumbent to ascending herb with a dark green color. The stem is 2–3 mm thick, with long lower internodes covered in dirty, soft hairs. The leaves are alternate, but become opposite on the upper part of erect stems. They are rounded to broadly ovate, with a rounded to obtuse apex and a rounded base, and are moderately small (1.5–3.5 cm in both length and width). The leaves are 3–5-nerved, paler beneath, and sparsely covered on both surfaces with appressed hairs, especially along the nerves. The densely pilose petiole is 1–1.5 cm long. The spikes are solitary or multiple in the upper axils. When young, they are barely 15 mm long and 1 mm thick, densely flowered, and borne on a slender, pilose peduncle scarcely 5 mm long. The floral bracts are round-peltate, relatively large, and yellow.

== Taxonomy and naming ==
It was described in 1936 by William Trelease in Publications of the Field Museum of Natural History, Botanical Series 13, from specimens collected by James Francis Macbride. It got its epithet from the description of the type specimen, which translates to "crowded spike".

== Subtaxa ==
Following subtaxa are accepted.

- Peperomia confertispica var. erecta Trel.

== Distribution and habitat ==
It is endemic in Peru. It grows on a epiphyte environment and is a herb. It grows on wet tropical biomes.

== Conservation ==
This species is assessed as Threatened, in a preliminary report.
