= P. polymorpha =

P. polymorpha may refer to:

- Pareledone polymorpha, a cephalopod mollusc
- Parmelia polymorpha, a strap lichen
- Pecopteris polymorpha, a prehistoric plant
- Peperomia polymorpha, a radiator plant
- Persicaria polymorpha, a buckwheat native to Russia
- Peyssonnelia polymorpha, a red alga
- Pheidole polymorpha, a fungus-growing ant
- Pinanga polymorpha, a palm tree
- Plecoptera polymorpha, an owlet moth
- Plumatella polymorpha, a freshwater bryozoan
- Polymixis polymorpha, an owlet moth
- Potentilla polymorpha, a herbaceous plant
- Preussia polymorpha, a saprobic fungus
- Pseudopalaina polymorpha, a land snail
- Psychotria polymorpha, an understorey tree
