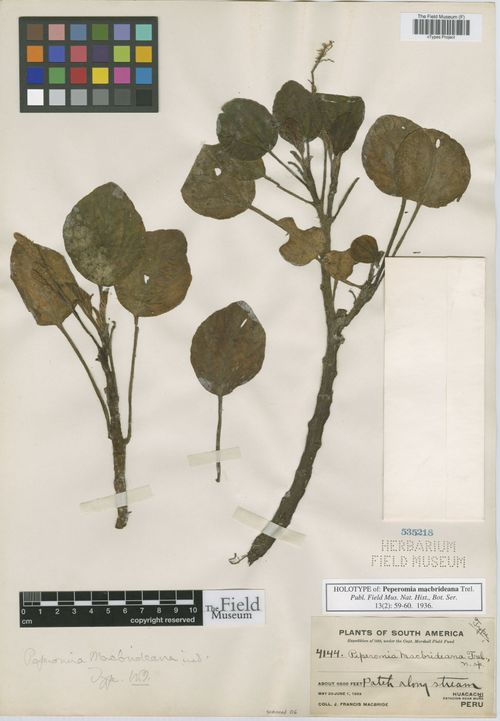

Scientific classification
- Kingdom: Plantae
- Clade: Tracheophytes
- Clade: Angiosperms
- Clade: Magnoliids
- Order: Piperales
- Family: Piperaceae
- Genus: Peperomia
- Species: P. macbrideana

Binomial name
- Peperomia macbrideana Trel.

= Peperomia macbrideana =

Species of plant

Peperomia macbrideana is a species of epiphytic herb in the genus Peperomia that is endemic to Peru. It grows on wet tropical biomes. Its conservation status is Threatened.

== Description ==
The type specimen were collected at near Huacachi, Peru at an altitude of 1950 meters above sea level.

Peperomia macbrideana is a rather large, ascending herb with a somewhat thick stem, 3–6 mm in diameter, with short, glabrate internodes. The leaves are alternate or occasionally subopposite, round-elliptic to orbicular, rounded at both ends, and medium-sized, measuring 4–6 cm long and 3.5–5 cm wide. They are palmately 5-nerved, with branched nerves, and have rust-colored villous hairs on the underside along the nerves. The slender petiole is 3–8 cm long, shorter on the upper leaves. The spikes are congested in a spicate arrangement at the apex of a pilose branchlet. When young, they are barely 5 mm long.

== Taxonomy and naming ==
It was described in 1936 by William Trelease in Publications of the Field Museum of Natural History, Botanical Series 13, from specimens collected by James Francis Macbride.

The epithet macbrideana honors the collector of the type specimen.

== Distribution and habitat ==
It is endemic to Peru. It grows as an epiphytic herb. It grows on wet tropical biomes.

== Conservation ==
This species is assessed as Threatened, in a preliminary report.
