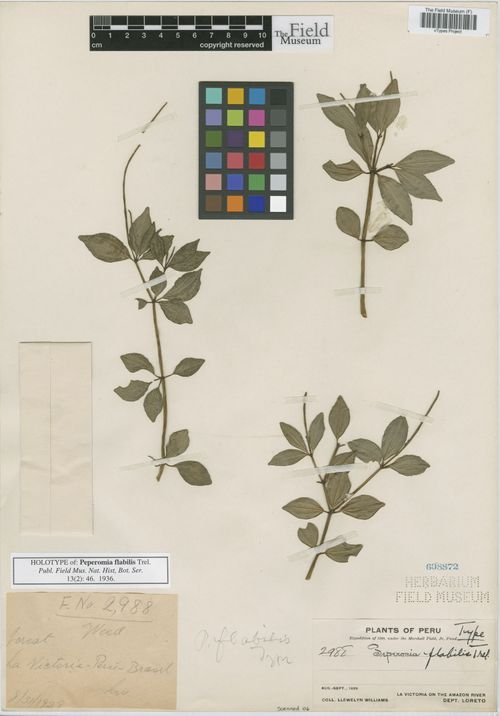

Scientific classification
- Kingdom: Plantae
- Clade: Tracheophytes
- Clade: Angiosperms
- Clade: Magnoliids
- Order: Piperales
- Family: Piperaceae
- Genus: Peperomia
- Species: P. flabilis

Binomial name
- Peperomia flabilis Trel.

= Peperomia flabilis =

Species of flowering plant

Peperomia flabilis is a species of epiphyte in the genus Peperomia that is endemic in Peru. It grows on wet tropical biomes. Its conservation status is Threatened.

== Description ==
The type specimen were collected near Victoria, Peru.

Peperomia flabilis is a moderately small, more or less forked, glabrous herb with a stem 2–3 mm thick. The leaves are in whorls of 3–4 at the nodes. They are bluntly acuminate, with an acute base, measuring 2–3 cm long and 1–1.5 cm wide. The leaves are 3-nerved, opaque, and paler with a minute granular texture on the underside. The slender petiole is 3–6 mm long. The spikes are terminal and from the upper axils, filiform, reaching 100 mm (3.9 in) in length, and are borne on a very slender peduncle 10 mm long.

== Taxonomy and naming ==
It was described in 1936 by William Trelease in Publications of the Field Museum of Natural History, Botanical Series 13, from specimens collected by James Francis Macbride. It got its epithet from the Latin flabilis, referring to its delicate, slender spikes that might sway in the wind, or to its habitat.

== Distribution and habitat ==
It is endemic in Peru. It grows on a epiphyte environment and is a herb. It grows on wet tropical biomes.

== Conservation ==
This species is assessed as Threatened, in a preliminary report.
