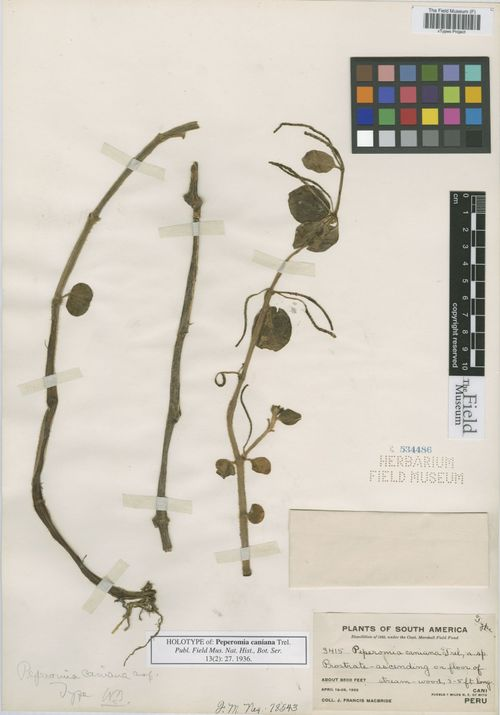

Scientific classification
- Kingdom: Plantae
- Clade: Tracheophytes
- Clade: Angiosperms
- Clade: Magnoliids
- Order: Piperales
- Family: Piperaceae
- Genus: Peperomia
- Species: P. caniana

Binomial name
- Peperomia caniana Trel.

= Peperomia caniana =

Species of flowering plant

Peperomia caniana is a species of epiphyte in the genus Peperomia that is endemic in Peru. It grows on wet tropical biomes. Its conservation status is Threatened.

== Description ==
The type specimen were collected near Cani, Peru, at an altitude of 2,550 meters (8,370 ft).

Peperomia caniana is a moderately small, creeping then ascending herb with stems 2–4 mm thick that are covered in crisp, villous hairs. The leaves alternate. The lower leaves are orbicular that measure 12–25 mm long and 12–20 mm wide, while the upper ones are broadly ovate. All leaves are obtuse or rounded at both ends, with the lower ones sometimes bearing a small point. The leaves are 3-nerved and covered in rather tightly appressed hairs, though the upper surface may become glabrescent. The petiole is scarcely 5 mm long and crisp-pilose. The terminal spikes are borne in an umbel-like cluster. They are about 60 mm long and 1 mm thick, with loosely arranged flowers, and are carried on a loosely pilose peduncle 1.5–2 cm long. The berries are globose to ovoid, immersed in the rachis, and have a subapical stigma.

== Taxonomy and naming ==
It was described in 1936 by William Trelease in Publications of the Field Museum of Natural History, Botanical Series 13, from specimens collected by James Francis Macbride. It got its name from the location where the type specimen was collected.

== Distribution and habitat ==
It is endemic in Peru. It grows on a epiphyte environment and is a herb. It grows on wet tropical biomes.

== Conservation ==
This species has been assessed as threatened in a preliminary report.
