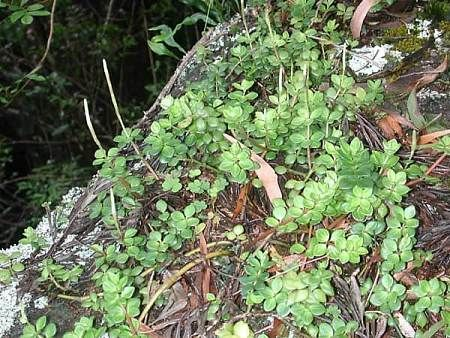

Scientific classification
- Kingdom: Plantae
- Clade: Tracheophytes
- Clade: Angiosperms
- Clade: Magnoliids
- Order: Piperales
- Family: Piperaceae
- Genus: Peperomia
- Species: P. trichopus

Binomial name
- Peperomia trichopus Trel.

= Peperomia trichopus =

Species of flowering plant

Peperomia trichopus is a species of epiphytic subshrub or herb in the genus Peperomia found in parts of United States and parts of South America. It primarily grows on wet tropical biomes. Its conservation status is Not Threatened.

== Description ==
The first specimens where collected in Peru.

Peperomia trichopus is a very delicate epiphytic creeping herb, with a glabrous filiform stem. The leaves at the node usually 5 obovate-cuneate with a rounded tip. It is barely 5 mm long and 4 mm wide. It is 3-nerved, appressed-pubescent above, filiform petioles in whorls, 2–5 mm long. The terminal spikes are 30 mm long, 1 cm thick, loose catkins, with a filiform peduncle 3–4 cm long. The bracts are round. The red-brown berries are oblong, curved, short but distinctly loaded, subconically apiculate, with terminal stigma.

== Taxonomy and naming ==
It was described in 1936 by William Trelease in Publications of the Field Museum of Natural History, Botanical Series 13, from specimens collected by James Francis Macbride. It got its name from the description of the leaves.

== Distribution and Habitat ==
It is found in United States and parts of South America, specifically West South America. It grows on an epiphyte environment and is a subshrub or herb. In Colombia, its elevation range is 1600–2300 meters. It grows on wet tropical biomes.

== Conservation ==
This species is assessed as Not Threatened, in a preliminary report.
