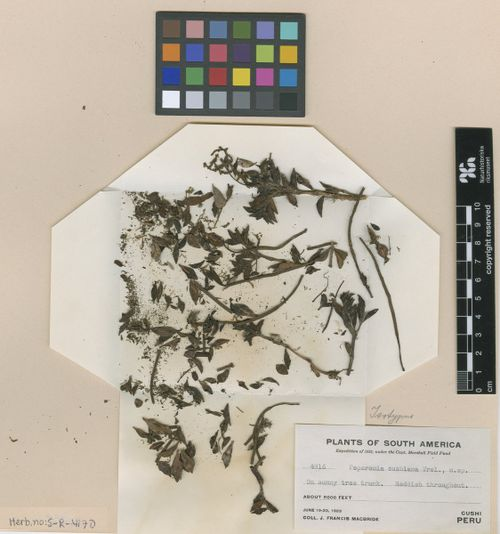

Scientific classification
- Kingdom: Plantae
- Clade: Tracheophytes
- Clade: Angiosperms
- Clade: Magnoliids
- Order: Piperales
- Family: Piperaceae
- Genus: Peperomia
- Species: P. cushiana

Binomial name
- Peperomia cushiana Trel.

= Peperomia cushiana =

Species of flowering plant

Peperomia cushiana is a species of epiphyte in the genus Peperomia that is endemic in Peru. It grows on wet tropical biomes. Its conservation status is Threatened.

== Description ==
The type specimen were collected near Cushi, Peru, at an altitude of 1,500 meters (4,900 ft).

Peperomia cushiana is a somewhat small, tufted, more or less forked, succulent herb that turns reddish and is glabrous, drying to a brown color. The stem is barely 2 mm thick with short internodes that are more or less exfoliating in a scurfy manner. The leaves are typically in whorls of 3. They are elliptical, pointed at both ends, and small (10–15 mm long, 5–7 mm wide), very fleshy, and 1-nerved, becoming plicate when dry. The very short petiole is 1–2 mm long. The spikes are terminal and from the upper axils, 60 mm long and 1.5 mm thick, densely flowered, and borne on a peduncle 10–17 mm long. The immersed ovary is ovoid-acuminate with a nearly apical stigma.

== Taxonomy and naming ==
It was described in 1936 by William Trelease in Publications of the Field Museum of Natural History, Botanical Series 13, from specimens collected by James Francis Macbride. It got its epithet from the type locality.

== Distribution and habitat ==
It is endemic in Peru. It grows on a epiphyte environment and is a herb. It grows on wet tropical biomes.

== Conservation ==
This species is assessed as Threatened, in a preliminary report.
