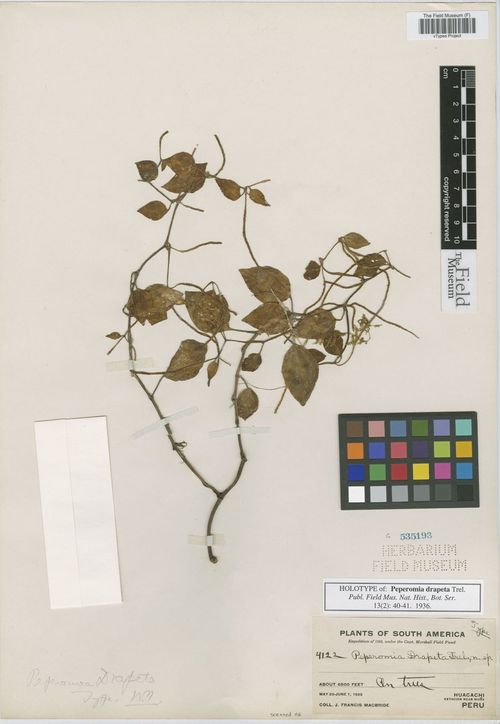

Scientific classification
- Kingdom: Plantae
- Clade: Tracheophytes
- Clade: Angiosperms
- Clade: Magnoliids
- Order: Piperales
- Family: Piperaceae
- Genus: Peperomia
- Species: P. drapeta

Binomial name
- Peperomia drapeta Trel.

= Peperomia drapeta =

Species of flowering plant

Peperomia drapeta is a species of epiphyte in the genus Peperomia that is endemic in Peru. It grows on wet tropical biomes. Its conservation status is Threatened.

== Description ==
The type specimen were collected near Huacachi, Peru, at an altitude of 1,950 meters (6,400 ft).

Peperomia drapeta is a moderately small, diffuse, tree-dwelling herb. When dry, the somewhat slender, angled stem is 1–2 mm thick, with densely interwoven branches, the sterile tips of which are crisp-villous. The alternate leaves are round to ovate and somewhat acuminate, with the longer leaves having a somewhat acute base. They are small, measuring 1–3.5 cm long and 1.5–2 cm wide, and are somewhat opaque when dry. The leaves are 3–5-nerved, with crisp pubescence above or glabrescent except on the nerves. The depressed-pilose petiole is about 1 cm long. The terminal and axillary spikes are 30–50 mm long and 1 mm thick, with loosely arranged flowers, and are borne on a 5 mm peduncle that is sparsely soft-pilose to glabrate. The berries are rounded-ovoid, mucronate, with a subapical stigma.

== Taxonomy and naming ==
It was described in 1936 by William Trelease in Publications of the Field Museum of Natural History, Botanical Series 13, from specimens collected by James Francis Macbride. It got its epithet from the Greek wikt:drapeta, referring to its sprawling, diffuse growth habit.

== Distribution and habitat ==
It is endemic in Peru. It grows on a epiphyte environment and is a herb. It grows on wet tropical biomes.

== Conservation ==
This species is assessed as Threatened, in a preliminary report.
