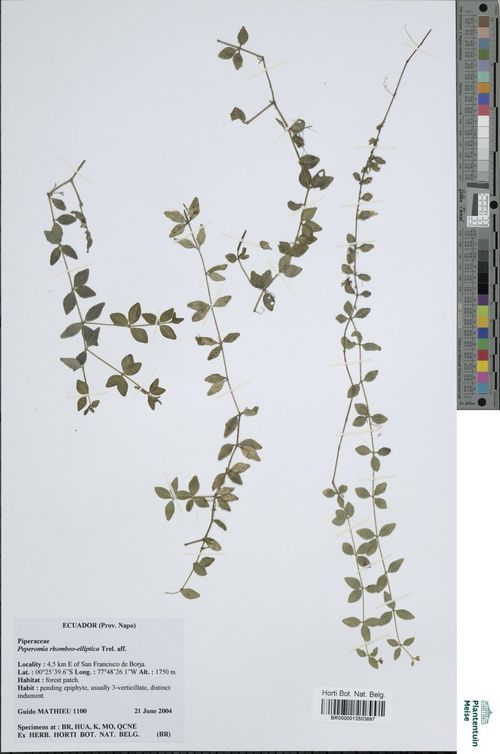

Scientific classification
- Kingdom: Plantae
- Clade: Tracheophytes
- Clade: Angiosperms
- Clade: Magnoliids
- Order: Piperales
- Family: Piperaceae
- Genus: Peperomia
- Species: P. rhombeoelliptica

Binomial name
- Peperomia rhombeoelliptica Trel.

= Peperomia rhombeoelliptica =

Species of flowering plant

Peperomia rhombeoelliptica is a species of epiphyte in the genus Peperomia that is endemic in Peru. It grows on wet tropical biomes. Its conservation status is Not Threatened.

== Description ==
The type specimen were collected near Huacachi, Peru at an altitude of 1950 meters.

Peperomia rhombeoelliptica is a delicate, creeping, essentially glabrous, tree-dwelling, pendulous herb. The leaves are in whorls of 2–5 at the nodes. They are elliptic or rhombic, equally rounded at both ends (though the base is more acute), small, measuring 9–12 mm long and about 6 mm wide. The lowermost leaves are more rounded and only 3 mm long. They are thin, obscurely 3-nerved, with the midrib having a few branches above. The very short petiole is about 1 mm long and puberulous. The terminal spikes are 15 mm long and 2 mm thick, densely flowered, with a peduncle 5–10 mm long. The round-peltate bracts are glandular.

== Taxonomy and naming ==
It was described in 1936 by William Trelease in Publications of the Field Museum of Natural History, Botanical Series 13, from specimens collected by James Francis Macbride. The epithet rhombeo-elliptica describes the leaf shape as intermediate between rhombic and elliptic.

== Distribution and habitat ==
It is endemic in Peru. It grows on a epiphyte environment and is a herb. It grows on wet tropical biomes.

== Conservation ==
Its conservation status is Not Threatened.
