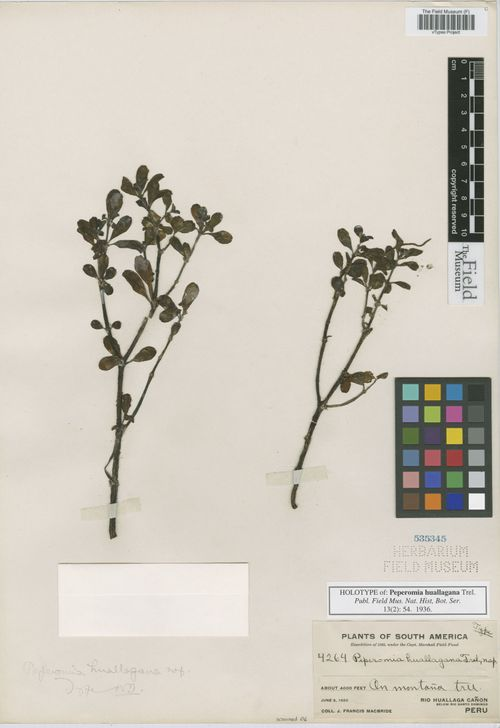

Scientific classification
- Kingdom: Plantae
- Clade: Tracheophytes
- Clade: Angiosperms
- Clade: Magnoliids
- Order: Piperales
- Family: Piperaceae
- Genus: Peperomia
- Species: P. huallagana

Binomial name
- Peperomia huallagana Trel.

= Peperomia huallagana =

Species of flowering plant

Peperomia huallagana is a species of epiphytic herb in the genus Peperomia that is native to Peru. It grows on wet tropical biomes. Its conservation status is Threatened.

== Description ==
The type specimen were collected at Río Huallaga Canyon, Peru.

Peperomia huallagana is a moderately small, epiphytic, erect, more or less dichotomously branched, glabrous herb with a stem 2–3 mm thick. The leaves are typically in whorls of 3–4 at the nodes. They are obovate to obovate-oblong, slightly emarginate, with a cuneate base, measuring 12–20 mm long and 6–10 mm wide. They are obscurely 3-nerved, with the midrib indistinctly branched. The winged petiole is 2–5 mm long. The small terminal spikes are 30 mm long and 1 mm thick, densely flowered, and borne on a 1 cm peduncle. The flowers are immersed between anastomosing ribs on the rachis.

== Taxonomy and naming ==
It was described in 1936 by William Trelease in Publications of the Field Museum of Natural History, Botanical Series 13, from specimens collected by James Francis Macbride.

The epithet is derived from the type locality, the Río Huallaga Canyon in Peru, where this species was first collected.

== Distribution and habitat ==
It is native to Peru. It grows as an epiphytic herb. It grows on wet tropical biomes.

== Conservation ==
This species is assessed as Threatened, in a preliminary report.
