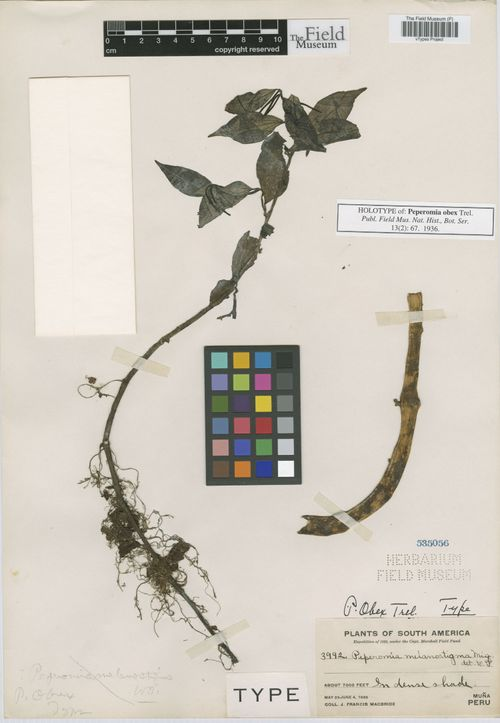

Scientific classification
- Kingdom: Plantae
- Clade: Tracheophytes
- Clade: Angiosperms
- Clade: Magnoliids
- Order: Piperales
- Family: Piperaceae
- Genus: Peperomia
- Species: P. obex

Binomial name
- Peperomia obex Trel.

= Peperomia obex =

Species of plant

Peperomia obex is a species of terrestrial or epiphytic herb in the genus Peperomia that is native to Peru. It grows on wet tropical biomes. Its conservation status is Threatened.

== Description ==
The type specimen were collected at Muña, Peru.

Peperomia obex is a rather large, more or less branched, stoloniferous-ascending, glabrous herb with a stem 2–3 mm thick, sometimes becoming very thick toward the base. The alternate leaves are lanceolate-ovate, acuminate, with an acute base, measuring 3–5 cm long and 1.5–2 cm wide. They are 5-nerved and dotted with black glands, and when dry are thin and purplish. The petiole is 5–10 mm long. The spikes are terminal and from the upper axils, 25 mm long, and shortly pedunculate.

== Taxonomy and naming ==
It was described in 1936 by William Trelease in Publications of the Field Museum of Natural History, Botanical Series 13, from specimens collected by James Francis Macbride.

The epithet obex is Latin for "barrier" or "obstacle," possibly referring to some feature that confused identification.

== Distribution and habitat ==
It is native to Peru. It grows as a terrestrial or epiphytic herb. It grows on wet tropical biomes.

== Conservation ==
This species is assessed as Threatened, in a preliminary report.
