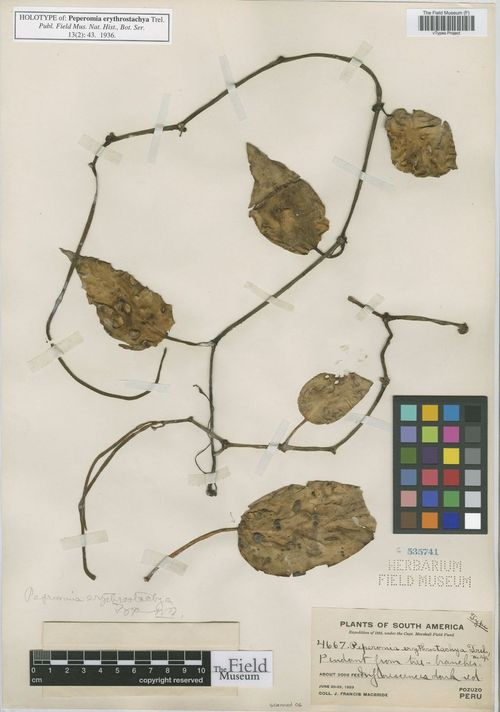

Scientific classification
- Kingdom: Plantae
- Clade: Tracheophytes
- Clade: Angiosperms
- Clade: Magnoliids
- Order: Piperales
- Family: Piperaceae
- Genus: Peperomia
- Species: P. erythrostachya

Binomial name
- Peperomia erythrostachya Trel.

Synonyms
- Peperomia rubrispica Trel.

= Peperomia erythrostachya =

Species of flowering plant

Peperomia erythrostachya is a species of epiphyte in the genus Peperomia that is endemic in Peru. It grows on wet tropical biomes. Its conservation status is Threatened.

== Description ==
The type specimen were collected near Posuso, Peru, at an altitude of 600 meters (2,000 ft).

Peperomia erythrostachya is a rather large, glabrous, pendulous, epiphytic herb. The moderately slender stem is 2–3 mm thick and, when dry, is a reddish-brown with a somewhat shiny surface. The alternate leaves are ovate to elongated-ovate, acute to somewhat acuminate, with a rounded to subcordate base. They are quite large, 6–9 cm long and about 4 cm wide, and when dry are opaque, leathery, with multiple pinnate nerves. The petiole is 2.5–6 cm long or more. The axillary spikes are long and slender, reaching 200 mm (7.9 in) in length and 2 mm in thickness. They are dark red and densely flowered, borne on a 2 cm peduncle that is bracteate in the middle. The round-peltate bracts are relatively large.

== Taxonomy and naming ==
It was described in 1936 by William Trelease in Publications of the Field Museum of Natural History, Botanical Series 13, from specimens collected by James Francis Macbride. It got its epithet from the Greek erythro- + stachys, referring to the distinctive dark red flower spikes.

== Distribution and habitat ==
It is endemic in Peru. It grows on a epiphyte environment and is a herb. It grows on wet tropical biomes.

== Conservation ==
This species is assessed as Threatened, in a preliminary report.
