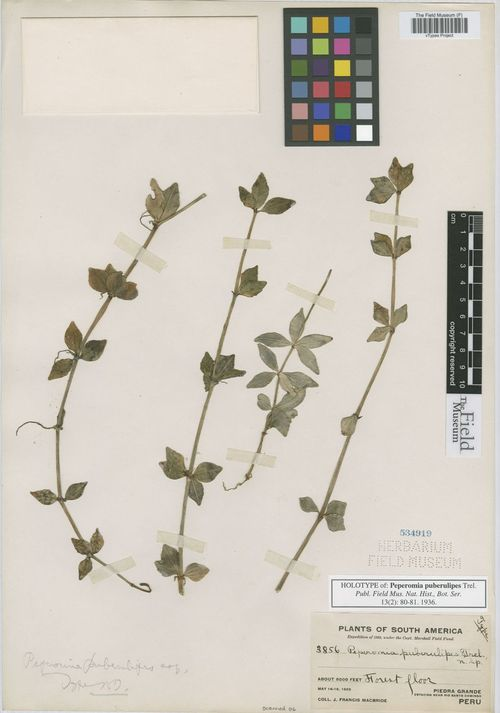

Scientific classification
- Kingdom: Plantae
- Clade: Tracheophytes
- Clade: Angiosperms
- Clade: Magnoliids
- Order: Piperales
- Family: Piperaceae
- Genus: Peperomia
- Species: P. puberulipes

Binomial name
- Peperomia puberulipes Trel.

= Peperomia puberulipes =

Species of plant

Peperomia puberulipes is a species of terrestrial or epiphytic herb in the genus Peperomia that is native to Peru. It grows on wet tropical biomes. Its conservation status is threatened.

== Description ==
The type specimen were collected at Piedra Grande, Peru at an altitude of 1500 meters above sea level.

Peperomia puberulipes is a moderately small, diffuse, essentially glabrous herb with a somewhat slender stem 2–3 mm thick, grooved when dry. The leaves are typically in whorls of 3–4 at the nodes. They are rhombic, obtuse, with an acute base, small, measuring 2–2.5 cm long and 1–1.5 cm wide. When dry, they are more or less revolute, 3- or obscurely 5-nerved. The very short petiole is about 2 mm long and, along with the midrib beneath, is microscopically puberulous. The terminal spikes are 100 mm long and 2 mm thick, densely flowered, with a peduncle as thick as the spike, 3.5 cm long. The anthers are oblong, about 0.5 mm long.

== Taxonomy and naming ==
It was described in 1936 by William Trelease in Publications of the Field Museum of Natural History, Botanical Series 13, from specimens collected by James Francis Macbride.

The epithet combines puberulus (minutely pubescent) and pes (foot), referring to the minutely hairy petioles and peduncles.

== Distribution and habitat ==
It is native to Peru. It grows as a terrestrial or epiphytic herb. It grows on wet tropical biomes.

== Conservation ==
This species has been assessed as threatened in a preliminary report.
