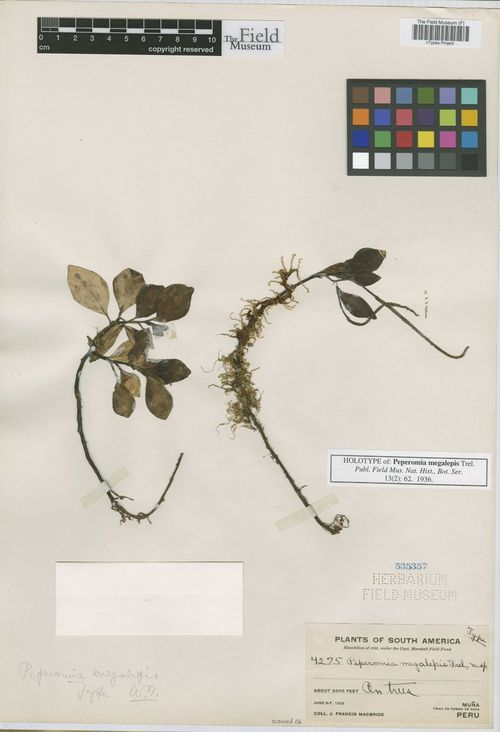

Scientific classification
- Kingdom: Plantae
- Clade: Tracheophytes
- Clade: Angiosperms
- Clade: Magnoliids
- Order: Piperales
- Family: Piperaceae
- Genus: Peperomia
- Species: P. megalepis

Binomial name
- Peperomia megalepis Trel.

= Peperomia megalepis =

Species of plant

Peperomia megalepis is a species of terrestrial or epiphytic herb in the genus Peperomia that is native to Peru. It grows on wet tropical biomes. Its conservation status is Threatened.

== Description ==
The type specimen were collected at Muña, Peru at an altitude of 2400 meters above sea level.

Peperomia megalepis is a moderately small, creeping then ascending, glabrous, tree-dwelling herb with a somewhat slender stem 2–3 mm thick and short internodes. The alternate leaves are rhombic-elliptic to obovate, somewhat acute, and small, measuring 1.5–3.5 cm long and 1–2 cm wide. When dry, they are opaque and 5-nerved. The petiole is 5–10 mm long. The terminal and axillary spikes are 70 mm long and 2 mm thick, with somewhat loosely arranged flowers, and are borne on a peduncle nearly 2 cm long. The floral bracts are notably large, about 1 mm wide, and round-peltate.

== Taxonomy and naming ==
It was described in 1936 by William Trelease in Publications of the Field Museum of Natural History, Botanical Series 13, from specimens collected by James Francis Macbride.

The epithet is derived from the Greek megas (large) and lepis (scale), referring to the unusually large floral bracts that distinguish this species.

== Distribution and habitat ==
It is native to Peru. It grows as a terrestrial or epiphytic herb. It grows on wet tropical biomes.

== Conservation ==
This species is assessed as Threatened, in a preliminary report.
