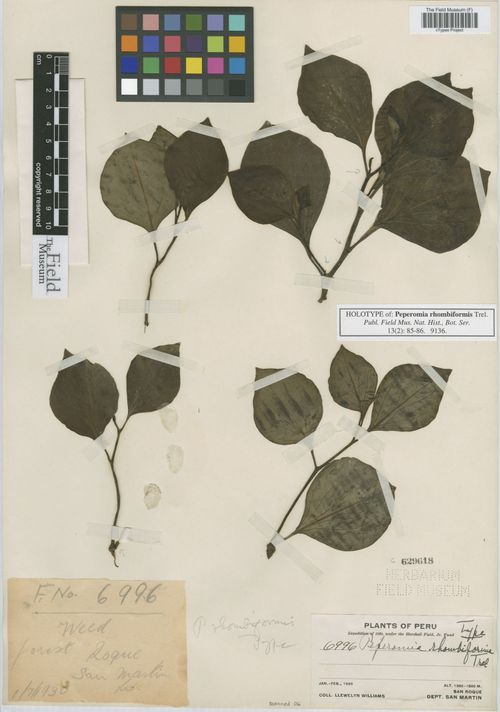

Scientific classification
- Kingdom: Plantae
- Clade: Tracheophytes
- Clade: Angiosperms
- Clade: Magnoliids
- Order: Piperales
- Family: Piperaceae
- Genus: Peperomia
- Species: P. rhombiformis

Binomial name
- Peperomia rhombiformis Trel.

= Peperomia rhombiformis =

Species of flowering plant

Peperomia rhombiformis is a species of epiphyte in the genus Peperomia that is endemic in Peru. It grows on wet tropical biomes. Its conservation status is Threatened.

== Description ==
The type specimen were collected near San Roque, Peru at an altitude of 1350-1500 meters.

Peperomia rhombiformis is a moderately tall, forest-dwelling herb that is transiently crisp-pubescent at the nodes, with ciliate petiole bases. The alternate leaves are rhombic, round-ovate, or obovate, shortly acuminate, with a cuneate base, measuring 5–8 cm long and 4–6 cm wide. They are 7–9-nerved, with 1–2 pairs of inner nerves confluent with the midrib for 1–2 cm. The upper surface is minutely black-granular, and the underside is coarsely granular. The petiole is 1–2 cm long. The inflorescence was not seen on the type specimen.

== Taxonomy and naming ==
It was described in 1936 by William Trelease in Publications of the Field Museum of Natural History, Botanical Series 13, from specimens collected by Lleweyn Williams. The epithet rhombiformis means "formed like a rhombus," referring to the characteristic rhombic shape of the leaves.

== Distribution and habitat ==
It is endemic in Peru. It grows on a epiphyte environment and is a herb. It grows on wet tropical biomes.

== Conservation ==
Its conservation status is Threatened.
