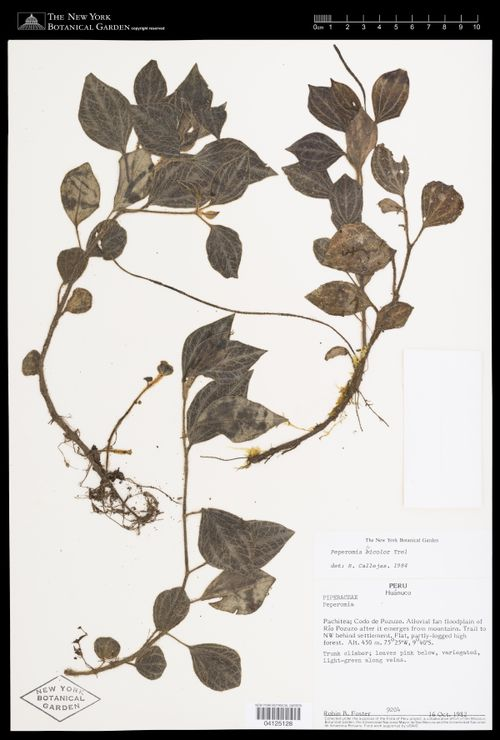

Scientific classification
- Kingdom: Plantae
- Clade: Embryophytes
- Clade: Tracheophytes
- Clade: Angiosperms
- Clade: Magnoliids
- Order: Piperales
- Family: Piperaceae
- Genus: Peperomia
- Species: P. tricolor

Binomial name
- Peperomia tricolor Trel.

= Peperomia tricolor =

Species of epiphyte

Peperomia tricolor is a species of epiphyte from the genus Peperomia. It was first described by William Trelease and published in the book "Publications of the Field Museum of Natural History, Botanical Series 13(2): 101. 1936 ". It grows on wet tropical biomes. Its etymology came from the green with white nerves, and red black glabrous.

== Distribution ==
It is endemic to Peru. First specimens where found at an altitude of 1100 meters in Junín.

- Colombia
  - Caquetá
- Ecuador
  - Morona-Santiago
  - Santiago-Zamora
- Peru
  - Huánuco
  - Junín
  - Cusco

== Description ==
It is a huge, abruptly ascending epiphytic herb. With a 3 mm thick, loosely pale-haired stem; with alternating leaves that are subrhombic-ovate and obtusely pointed at the base. They measure about 4-5 cm, and 3–5 cm in length. It has wide five nerves. The peduncle are 10 mm long, they are curly-pubescent and spike terminals. They are 100 mm long and 2 mm think. The petioles are 1 cm long, green with white nerves above, red black-granulous glabrous below.
