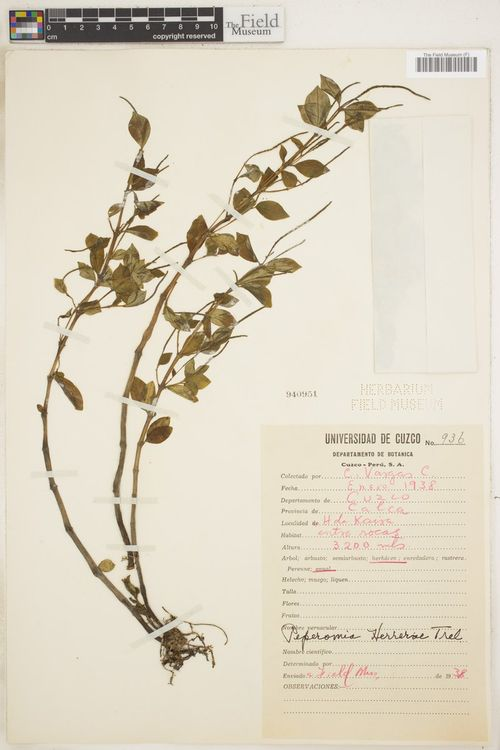

Scientific classification
- Kingdom: Plantae
- Clade: Tracheophytes
- Clade: Angiosperms
- Clade: Magnoliids
- Order: Piperales
- Family: Piperaceae
- Genus: Peperomia
- Species: P. herrerae

Binomial name
- Peperomia herrerae Trel.

= Peperomia herrerae =

Species of flowering plant

Peperomia herrerae is a species of epiphyte in the genus Peperomia that is endemic to Peru. It grows on wet tropical biomes. Its conservation status is Threatened.

== Description ==
The type specimen were collected in the Paucartambo, Peru, at an altitude of 3,500 meters (11,500 ft).

Peperomia herrerae is an ascending, more or less branched, moderately small, glabrous herb with a stem 2–3 mm thick. The opposite leaves are elliptic, acute at both ends, measuring 2–2.5 cm long and 1–1.5 cm wide. They are delicately 3-nerved, with the midrib more or less branched, and when dry are thin and green. The petiole is 2 mm long. The terminal and axillary spikes are somewhat abundant, 40–50 mm (1.6–2.0 in) long and 2 mm thick, with rather loosely arranged flowers, and are borne on a slender peduncle 15 mm long. The berries are rounded-ovoid and mucronate, with a somewhat lobed, subapical stigma.

== Taxonomy and naming ==
It was described in 1936 by William Trelease in Publications of the Field Museum of Natural History, Botanical Series 13, from specimens collected by Fortunato L. Herrera. The epithet herrerae honors Fortunato L. Herrera, the collector of the type specimen from Paucartambo, Peru.

== Distribution and habitat ==
It is endemic to Peru. It grows on an epiphyte environment and is a herb. It grows on wet tropical biomes.

== Conservation ==
This species is assessed as Threatened, in a preliminary report.
