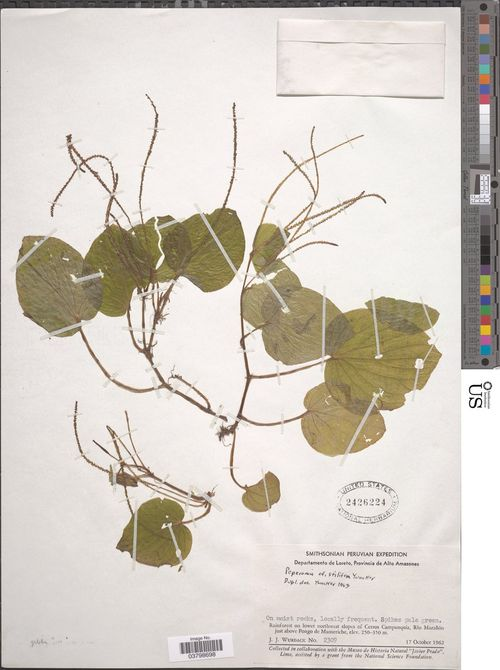

Scientific classification
- Kingdom: Plantae
- Clade: Tracheophytes
- Clade: Angiosperms
- Clade: Magnoliids
- Order: Piperales
- Family: Piperaceae
- Genus: Peperomia
- Species: P. fragilissima

Binomial name
- Peperomia fragilissima Trel.

= Peperomia fragilissima =

Species of flowering plant

Peperomia fragilissima is a species of epiphyte in the genus Peperomia that is endemic in Peru. It grows on wet tropical biomes. Its conservation status is Threatened.

== Description ==
The type specimen were collected near Yurimagus, Peru.

Peperomia fragilissima is a fleshy herb with a slender stem, notable for its extremely brittle and fragile texture. The alternate leaves are round-ovate, very obtuse, with a cordate base, measuring 2–4 cm in length and 2–3.5 cm in width. The leaves have multiple pinnate nerves, with the longer nerves forked. The petiole is quite short, only 2–3 mm long. The spikes are axillary and terminal, very slender, 40–50 mm long, and are borne on a relatively long peduncle of 20–25 mm.

== Taxonomy and naming ==
It was described in 1936 by William Trelease in Publications of the Field Museum of Natural History, Botanical Series 13, from specimens collected by Richard Spruce. It got its epithet from the Latin fragilis, referring to the plant's notably delicate and easily broken fleshy stems and leaves.

== Distribution and habitat ==
It is endemic in Peru. It grows on a epiphyte environment and is a herb. It grows on wet tropical biomes.

== Conservation ==
This species is assessed as Threatened, in a preliminary report.
