= Peperomia teresitensis =

Scientific classification
- Kingdom: Plantae
- Clade: Tracheophytes
- Clade: Angiosperms
- Clade: Magnoliids
- Order: Piperales
- Family: Piperaceae
- Genus: Peperomia
- Species: P. teresitensis

Binomial name
- Peperomia teresitensis Trel.

Species of plant

Peperomia teresitensis is a flowering plant from the genus Peperomia. Its native range is Peru. Its only country that is native in is also Peru.
