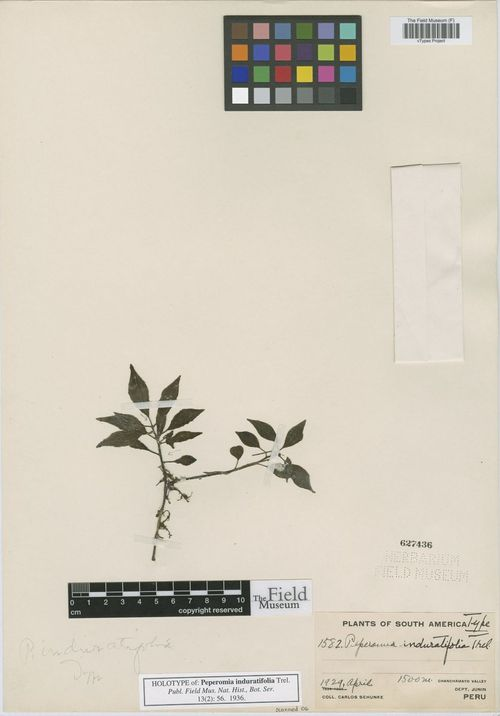

Scientific classification
- Kingdom: Plantae
- Clade: Tracheophytes
- Clade: Angiosperms
- Clade: Magnoliids
- Order: Piperales
- Family: Piperaceae
- Genus: Peperomia
- Species: P. induratifolia

Binomial name
- Peperomia induratifolia Trel.

= Peperomia induratifolia =

Species of flowering plant

Peperomia induratifolia is a species of epiphytic herb in the genus Peperomia that is native to Peru. It grows on wet tropical biomes. Its conservation status is Threatened.

== Description ==
The type specimen were collected at near Chanchamayo Valley, Peru, at an altitude of 1,500 meters (4,900 ft) above sea level.

Peperomia induratifolia is a small, essentially glabrous, creeping or stoloniferous herb that turns blackish when dry. The stem is 1–2 mm thick with short internodes. The leaves are alternate or the uppermost in whorls of 3. They are lanceolate, acuminate, with an acute base, measuring 20–30 mm long and 5–12 mm wide. They are opaque and scarcely more than 1-nerved. The petiole is 5–10 mm long. The apparently terminal spikes are filiform, 80–90 mm long, and borne on a 10 mm peduncle.

== Taxonomy and naming ==
It was described in 1936 by William Trelease in Publications of the Field Museum of Natural History, Botanical Series 13, from specimens collected by Carlos Schunke.

The epithet is drived from the Latin induratus + folia, referring to the firm, hardened texture of the leaves when dry.

== Distribution and habitat ==
It is native to Peru. It grows as an epiphytic herb. It grows on wet tropical biomes.

== Conservation ==
This species is assessed as Threatened, in a preliminary report.
