= Peperomia variculata =

Scientific classification
- Kingdom: Plantae
- Clade: Tracheophytes
- Clade: Angiosperms
- Clade: Magnoliids
- Order: Piperales
- Family: Piperaceae
- Genus: Peperomia
- Species: P. variculata

Binomial name
- Peperomia variculata Trel.

Species of herb

Peperomia variculata is a species of herb and epiphyte in the genus Peperomia.

== Etymology ==
variculata came from the Spanish word "varicela". Varicela means "chicken pox".

== Distribution ==
Peperomia variculata is native to Peru. Specimens can be found at an altitude of 525–1125 meters.

- Peru
  - Huánuco
    - Norte de Tingo María
      - Venenillo
  - Junín
    - Cahuapanas

== Description ==
It is a glabrous herb and epiphyte that has a slender stem. Leaves alternate broadly.
