= Peperomia yapasana =

Scientific classification
- Kingdom: Plantae
- Clade: Tracheophytes
- Clade: Angiosperms
- Clade: Magnoliids
- Order: Piperales
- Family: Piperaceae
- Genus: Peperomia
- Species: P. yapasana

Binomial name
- Peperomia yapasana Trel.

Species of plant

Peperomia yapasana is a species of plant from the genus Peperomia. It was discovered by William Trelease in Peru, 1929. In Junín, Pichis Trail, Peperomia yapasana has an elevation of 1,350 to 1,600 m (4,430 to 5,250 ft).
