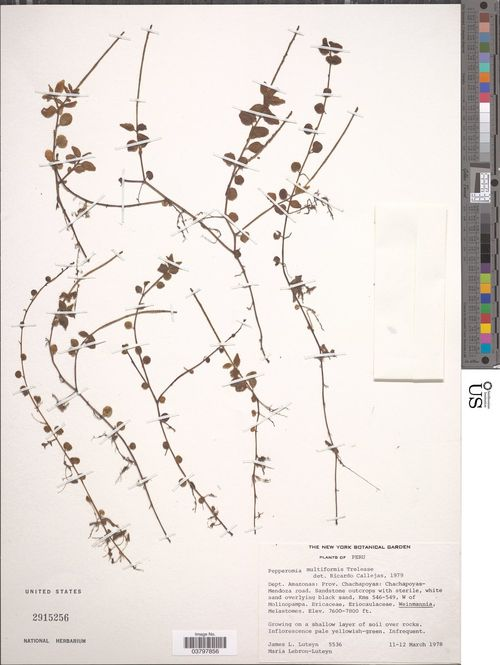

Scientific classification
- Kingdom: Plantae
- Clade: Tracheophytes
- Clade: Angiosperms
- Clade: Magnoliids
- Order: Piperales
- Family: Piperaceae
- Genus: Peperomia
- Species: P. multiformis

Binomial name
- Peperomia multiformis Trel.

= Peperomia multiformis =

Species of plant

Peperomia multiformis is a species of terrestrial or epiphytic herb in the genus Peperomia that is native to Peru. It grows on wet tropical biomes. Its conservation status is Threatened.

== Description ==
The type specimen were collected at Tarapoto, Peru.

Peperomia multiformis is a delicate, creeping then ascending herb with a filiform stem that is crisp-pubescent to somewhat villous. The leaves are alternate, and their form varies. Leaves on the stolons are orbicular, about 5 mm wide. Leaves on the ascending branchlets are obovate, barely 10 mm long, or elliptic, more or less acute at both ends. They may be glabrate or crisp-pubescent and glandular-granular on the underside. The petiole is barely 5 mm long. The terminal spikes are filiform, 40–70 mm long, and borne on a peduncle scarcely 1 cm long.

== Taxonomy and naming ==
It was described in 1936 by William Trelease in Publications of the Field Museum of Natural History, Botanical Series 13, from specimens collected by Richard Spruce.

The epithet is derived from the Latin for "many-formed"," directly referring to the variable leaf shapes found on different parts of the same plant, particularly between stolons and ascending branches.

== Distribution and habitat ==
It is native to Peru. It grows as a terrestrial or epiphytic herb. It grows on wet tropical biomes.

== Conservation ==
This species is assessed as Threatened, in a preliminary report.
