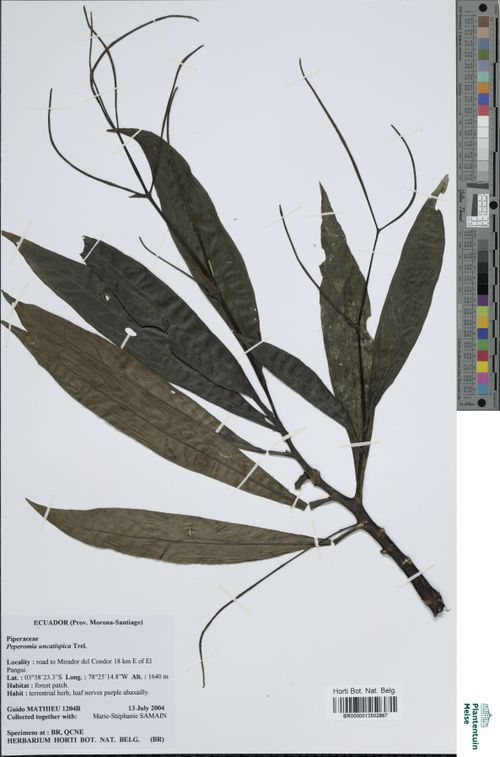

Scientific classification
- Kingdom: Plantae
- Clade: Embryophytes
- Clade: Tracheophytes
- Clade: Angiosperms
- Clade: Magnoliids
- Order: Piperales
- Family: Piperaceae
- Genus: Peperomia
- Species: P. uncatispica

Binomial name
- Peperomia uncatispica Trel.

= Peperomia uncatispica =

Species of flowering plant

Peperomia uncatispica is a species of plant from the genus Peperomia. It was first described by William Trelease and published in the book "Publications of the Field Museum of Natural History, Botanical Series 13(2): 102. 1936.". It primarily grows on wet tropical biomes.

== Distribution ==
It is endemic to Peru and Ecuador. First specimens were found at an altitude of 1400–1700 in Junín.

== Description ==
It is a huge, glabrous herb with euneate, 14–16 cm (5.5–6.3 in) bases, alternating leaves that are oblanceolate and increasingly pointy, and a short, thick stem with short internodes. Slender, 70 mm (2.8 in) long, 5 mm (0.20 in) long peduncle; round-peltate plates; spikes distributed in a single panicle terminating a lateral branch at the nodes of a solitary panicle; broad pinnatinervia everywhere, 4–6 cm (1.6–2.4 in) long, petiole 2 cm (0.79 in) long.
