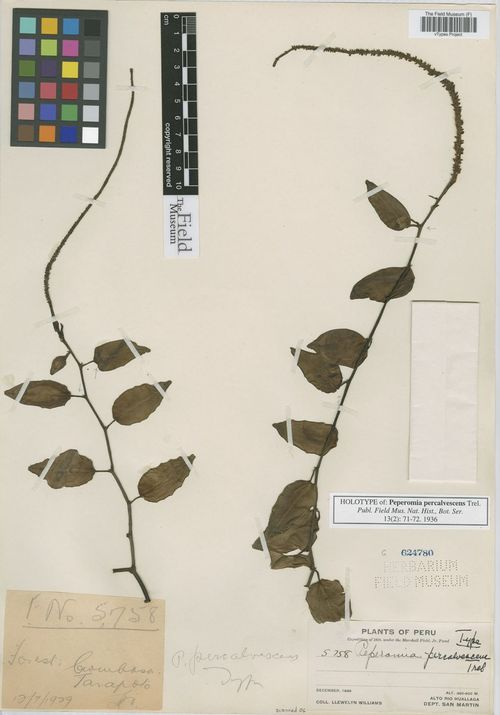

Scientific classification
- Kingdom: Plantae
- Clade: Tracheophytes
- Clade: Angiosperms
- Clade: Magnoliids
- Order: Piperales
- Family: Piperaceae
- Genus: Peperomia
- Species: P. percalvescens

Binomial name
- Peperomia percalvescens Trel.

= Peperomia percalvescens =

Species of plant

Peperomia percalvescens is a species of terrestrial or epiphytic herb in the genus Peperomia that is native to Peru. It grows on wet tropical biomes. Its conservation status is Threatened.

== Description ==
The type specimen were collected at Tarapoto, Peru at an altitude of 360-900 meters above sea level.

Peperomia percalvescens is a pendulous herb that is glabrous except for scattered, transient, slightly crisp-silky hairs. The firm stem is 2–3 mm thick. The alternate leaves are ovate, somewhat obtuse, with a rounded or obscurely cordulate base, measuring 4 cm long and 2 cm wide. They are pinnately nerved and, when dry, are leathery, opaque, and brown on the underside. The petiole is 5–10 mm long. The solitary spikes are terminal or terminate a deciduous, 2-bracteate branchlet about 1 cm long. They are slender, 150 mm long, reaching 5 mm thick in fruit, and are borne on a 10 mm peduncle. The berries are oblong with an oblique, acute shield bearing the central stigma.

== Taxonomy and naming ==
It was described in 1936 by William Trelease in Publications of the Field Museum of Natural History, Botanical Series 13, from specimens collected by Llewelyn Williams.

The epithet is derived from the Latin percalvescere (to grow warm), referring to the brownish coloration of the leaf undersides or some other feature suggesting warmth or heat.

== Distribution and habitat ==
It is native to Peru. It grows as a terrestrial or epiphytic herb. It grows on wet tropical biomes.

== Conservation ==
This species is assessed as Threatened, in a preliminary report.
