= Peperomia dyscrita =

Scientific classification
- Kingdom: Plantae
- Clade: Tracheophytes
- Clade: Angiosperms
- Clade: Magnoliids
- Order: Piperales
- Family: Piperaceae
- Genus: Peperomia
- Species: P. dyscrita

Binomial name
- Peperomia dyscrita Trel.

Species of epiphyte

Peperomia dyscrita is a species of epiphyte in the genus Peperomia that is endemic in Costa Rica. It grows on wet tropical biomes. Its conservation status is Threatened.

== Description ==
The type specimen was collected in Río Naranjo, Costa Rica.

Peperomia dyscrita is a moderately small, ascending, hairless herb. The stem is zigzag in shape, slender at 2 millimeters thick, and roots from the lower nodes. The leaves are alternate, narrowly lance-shaped, with a sharply long-tapered tip and an acute base. They are moderate in size at 1.5 to 2 by 8 to 10 centimeters, with 5 or 7 curved veins. The petiole is scarcely over 5 millimeters long and decurrent, meaning the leaf blade extends downward along the petiole as narrow wings. The spikes are terminal, thread-like, and rather long at 1 by 80 millimeters. The peduncle is scarcely 10 millimeters long. The floral bracts are round and shield-shaped (peltate).

== Taxonomy and naming ==
It was described in 1929 by William Trelease in Contributions from the United States National Herbarium 6. The epithet dyscrita comes from the Greek dyskritos meaning "hard to distinguish" or "hard to separate," referring to its similarity to other species or its zigzag stem that is difficult to characterize.

== Distribution and habitat ==
It is endemic in Costa Rica. It grows as an epiphyte and is a herb. It grows on wet tropical biomes.

== Conservation ==
This species is assessed as Threatened.
