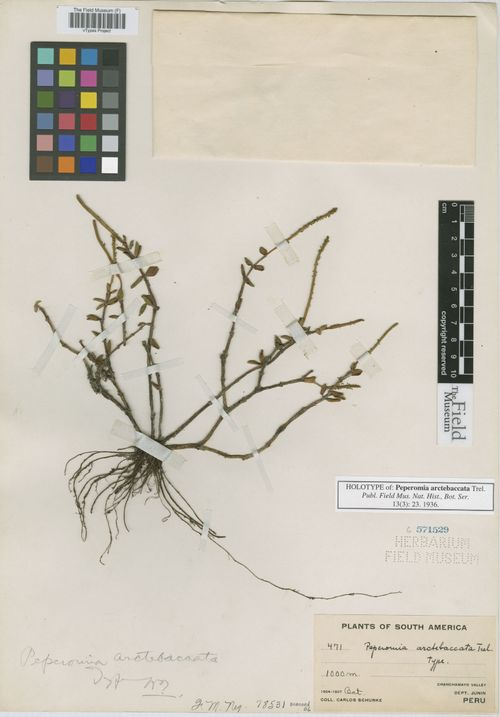

Scientific classification
- Kingdom: Plantae
- Clade: Tracheophytes
- Clade: Angiosperms
- Clade: Magnoliids
- Order: Piperales
- Family: Piperaceae
- Genus: Peperomia
- Species: P. arctebaccata

Binomial name
- Peperomia arctebaccata Trel.

= Peperomia arctebaccata =

Species of flowering plant

Peperomia arctebaccata is a species of epiphyte in the genus Peperomia that is endemic in Peru. It grows on wet tropical biomes. Its conservation status is Threatened.

== Description ==
The type specimen were collected near Chanchamayo Valley, Peru, at an altitude of 1,000 meters (3,300 ft).

Peperomia arctebaccata is a moderately small, densely tufted herb that roots closely along its stems, with a dichotomous branching pattern and a smooth surface. Its stems are 2 mm thick, firm, and somewhat scaly with exfoliating bark. The leaves are opposite or arranged in whorls of three or four, elliptical in shape with a blunt, slightly mucronate tip. They are scarcely 10 mm long and 5 mm wide, opaque, very thick, and have revolute margins. The undersides appear brownish when dried, with no visible nerves. Petioles are only 1 to 2 mm long. The flower spikes are terminal, 30 to 50 mm long and 2 mm thick, densely flowered, with each flower set into deep, oblong pits. They are borne on a thick peduncle 5 to 10 mm long. The floral bracts are minute, rounded, and peltate. The berries are extremely numerous, each with a short pseudocupula and a terminal stigma.

== Taxonomy and naming ==
It was described in 1936 by William Trelease in Publications of the Field Museum of Natural History, Botanical Series 13, from specimens collected by Carlos Schunke. It got its name from the description of the type specimen.

== Distribution and habitat ==
It is endemic in Peru. It grows on a epiphyte environment and is a herb. It grows on wet tropical biomes.

== Conservation ==
This species is assessed as Threatened, in a preliminary report.
