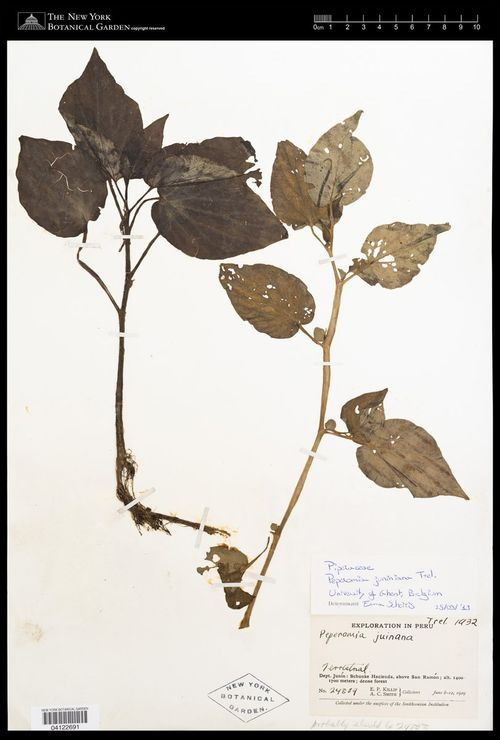

Scientific classification
- Kingdom: Plantae
- Clade: Tracheophytes
- Clade: Angiosperms
- Clade: Magnoliids
- Order: Piperales
- Family: Piperaceae
- Genus: Peperomia
- Species: P. juniniana

Binomial name
- Peperomia juniniana Trel.

= Peperomia juniniana =

Species of plant

Peperomia juniniana is a species of epiphytic herb in the genus Peperomia that is native to Ecuador & Peru. It grows on wet tropical biomes. Its conservation status is Threatened.

== Description ==
The type specimen were collected at Chanchamayo Valley, Peru at an altitude of 1200 meters above sea level.

Peperomia juniniana is a medium-sized, branching herb with a stem 1–3 mm thick that bears a transient crisp-villous indumentum. The alternate leaves are ovate, acuminate, with a shortly cordate base that is briefly cuneate within the sinus. They measure 4–10 cm long and 3–5 cm wide, with multiple pinnate nerves and a branched midrib. When dry, the leaves are thin, with a pale underside dotted with minute black glands, and the nerves are hirtellous. The crisp-hirtellous petiole is 1–4 cm long. The axillary spikes, when young, are 65 mm long and 2 mm thick, densely flowered, and borne on a 1 cm long, hirtellous peduncle.

== Taxonomy and naming ==
It was described in 1936 by William Trelease in Publications of the Field Museum of Natural History, Botanical Series 13, from specimens collected by Carlos Schunke.

The epithet is derived from the type locality where this species was first collected.

== Distribution and habitat ==
It is native to Ecuador & Peru. It grows as an epiphytic herb. It grows on wet tropical biomes.

== Conservation ==
This species is assessed as Threatened, in a preliminary report.
