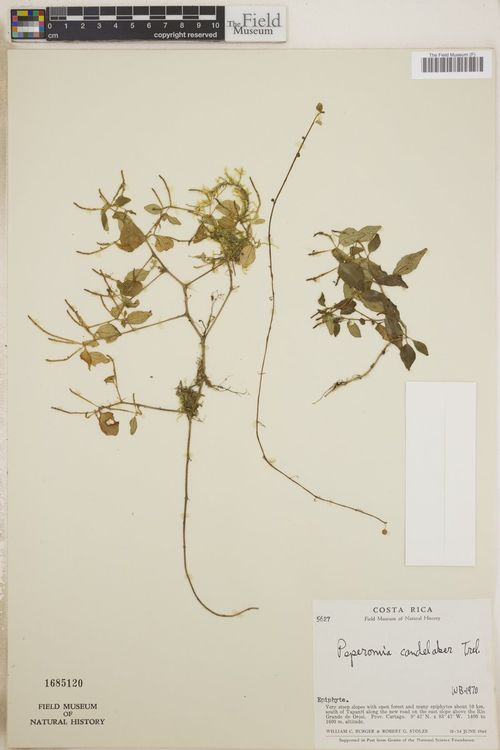

Scientific classification
- Kingdom: Plantae
- Clade: Tracheophytes
- Clade: Angiosperms
- Clade: Magnoliids
- Order: Piperales
- Family: Piperaceae
- Genus: Peperomia
- Species: P. candelaber

Binomial name
- Peperomia candelaber Trel.

= Peperomia candelaber =

Species of epiphyte

Peperomia candelaber is a species of epiphyte in the genus Peperomia that is endemic in Costa Rica. It grows on wet tropical biomes. Its conservation status is Threatened.

== Description ==
The type specimen was collected in La Palma, Costa Rica at an altitude of 1800 meters.

Peperomia candelaber is a small, creeping then ascending herb, often growing on trees. The stem is slender, measuring 1 to 2 millimeters thick, short, rooting from below, and sparsely velvety. The leaves are alternate, broadly elliptic but varying to round or oval, typically blunt at both ends, and small at 7 by 10 to 14 by 17 millimeters. Each leaf has 3 nerves and is obscurely minutely hairy beneath. The petiole is 3 to 6 millimeters long and somewhat minutely hairy. The flower spikes grow at the stem tip and from several of the upper leaf axils, spreading outward and turning upward, measuring about 1 by 20 millimeters with rather loosely spaced flowers, eventually developing false stalks. The peduncle is thread-like, about 5 millimeters long, and nearly hairless. The floral bracts are relatively large and round and shield-shaped (peltate). The berries are nearly globe-shaped with a short point at the tip. The stigma is nearly terminal and slightly lobed.

== Taxonomy and naming ==
It was described in 1929 by William Trelease in Contributions from the United States National Herbarium 6. The epithet candelaber is Latin for "candlestick" or "lampstand," referring to the spreading flower spikes that turn upward, resembling the branches of a candelabrum.

== Distribution and habitat ==
It is endemic in Costa Rica. It grows as an epiphyte and is a herb. It grows on wet tropical biomes.

== Conservation ==
This species is assessed as Threatened.
