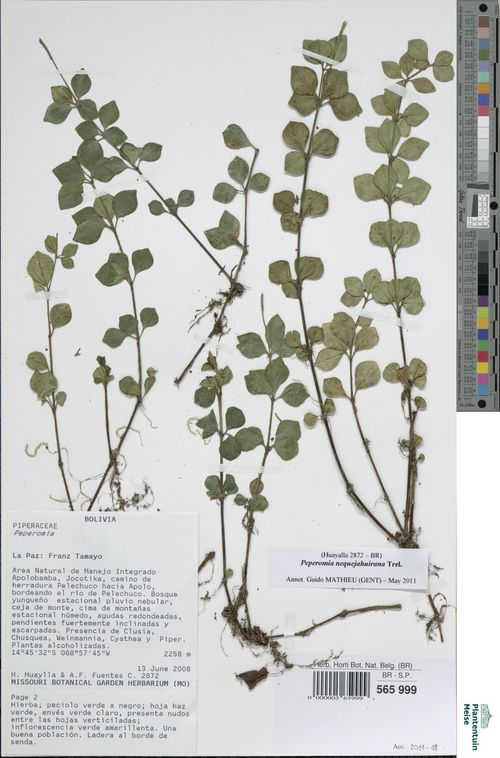

Scientific classification
- Kingdom: Plantae
- Clade: Tracheophytes
- Clade: Angiosperms
- Clade: Magnoliids
- Order: Piperales
- Family: Piperaceae
- Genus: Peperomia
- Species: P. nequejahuirana

Binomial name
- Peperomia nequejahuirana Trel.

= Peperomia nequejahuirana =

Species of flowering plant

Peperomia nequejahuirana is a species of epiphyte in the genus Peperomia that is endemic in Bolivia. It grows on wet tropical biomes. Its conservation status is Threatened.

== Description ==
The type specimen were collected near Nequejahuira, Bolivia, at an altitude of 8,000 ft (2,400 m).

Peperomia nequejahuirana is a stoloniferous-erect herb with a somewhat simple stem 2 mm thick, covered with fine short hairs. The leaves are commonly arranged about 4 at a node, elliptic-subovate, the lowest somewhat round and the uppermost sometimes somewhat oblong, obtuse, acute at base or cuneate, rather small at 1 × 1–2 cm or 1.5–2 × 2.5 cm. They are hairless, 3-nerved with the midrib branching, dull dark green above and paler beneath. The petiole is 5 mm long and covered with fine short hairs. The inflorescence is unknown.

== Taxonomy and naming ==
It was described in 1928 by William Trelease in Bulletin of the Torrey Botanical Club 55, from specimens collected by George Henry Hamilton Tate. It got its name from the location where the type specimen was collected.

== Distribution and habitat ==
It is endemic in Bolivia. It grows on a epiphyte environment and is a herb. It grows on wet tropical biomes.

== Conservation ==
This species is assessed as Threatened, in a preliminary report.
