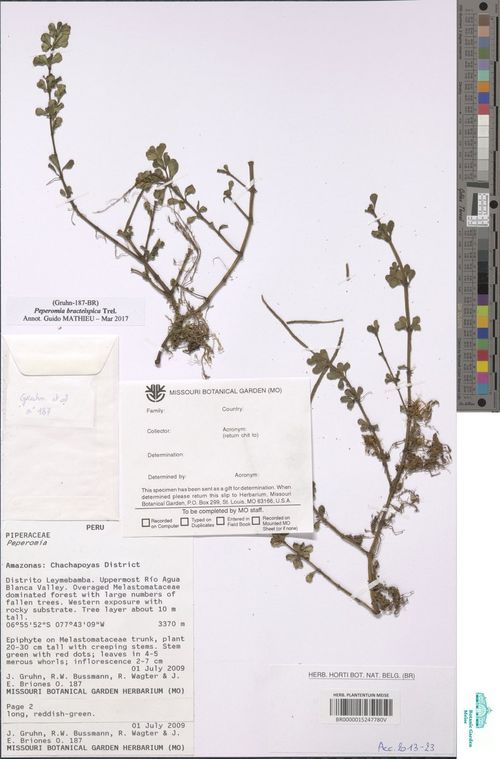

Scientific classification
- Kingdom: Plantae
- Clade: Tracheophytes
- Clade: Angiosperms
- Clade: Magnoliids
- Order: Piperales
- Family: Piperaceae
- Genus: Peperomia
- Species: P. bracteispica

Binomial name
- Peperomia bracteispica Trel.

= Peperomia bracteispica =

Species of flowering plant

Peperomia bracteispica is a species of epiphyte in the genus Peperomia that is endemic in Peru. It grows on wet tropical biomes. Its conservation status is Threatened.

== Description ==
The type specimen were collected near Nuña, Peru, at an altitude of 1,950 meters (6,400 ft).

Peperomia bracteispica is a small, creeping then ascending, hairless epiphytic herb with a very thin stem, only about 1 mm thick. The leaves are typically arranged in whorls of three. They are obovate in shape, with a truncate and slightly notched tip and a wedge-shaped base. They are quite small, measuring 9–11 mm long and 5–6 mm wide, with very obscure three-nerved venation. The filiform (thread-like) petioles are 3–4 mm long. The terminal spikes are barely 40 mm long and 1 mm thick, with somewhat loosely arranged flowers. The spike is borne on a 5 mm peduncle and is subtended by a single leaf inserted about 15 mm above the uppermost whorl. The rachis is covered in short, stalk-like structures. The floral bracts are round-peltate.

== Taxonomy and naming ==
It was described in 1936 by William Trelease in Publications of the Field Museum of Natural History, Botanical Series 13. It got its name from the description of the type specimen.

== Distribution and habitat ==
It is endemic in Peru. It grows on a epiphyte environment and is a herb. It grows on wet tropical biomes.

== Conservation ==
This species is assessed as Threatened, in a preliminary report.
