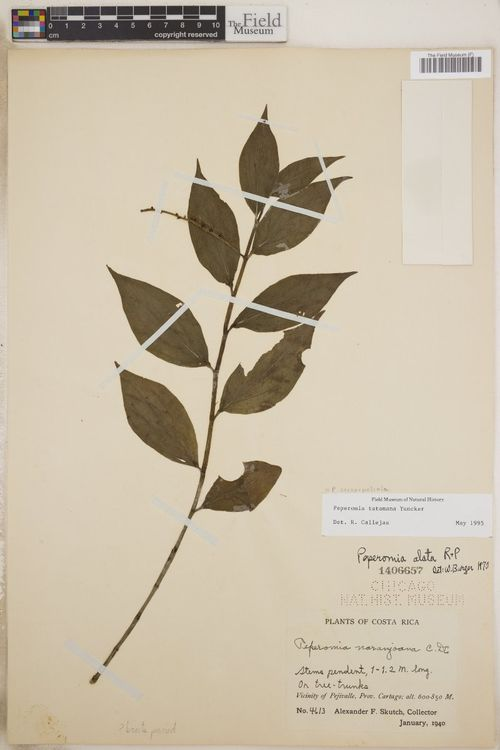

Scientific classification
- Kingdom: Plantae
- Clade: Tracheophytes
- Clade: Angiosperms
- Clade: Magnoliids
- Order: Piperales
- Family: Piperaceae
- Genus: Peperomia
- Species: P. crispipetiola

Binomial name
- Peperomia crispipetiola Trel.

Synonyms
- Peperomia tatamana Yunck.

= Peperomia crispipetiola =

Species of epiphyte

Peperomia crispipetiola is a species of epiphyte in the genus Peperomia that is endemic in Colombia, Costa Rica, and Panama. It grows on wet tropical biomes. Its conservation status is Threatened.

== Description ==
The type specimen was collected in Limón at an altitude of 300 - 1150 meters.

Peperomia crispipetiola is a rather large, hairless herb that grows on trees, resembling P. glabriaculis in appearance. The stem is moderate at 3 millimeters thick and roots from the nodes. The leaves are alternate, broadly elliptic, with a pointed, acuminate tip and an acute base. They are rather large at 4 to 4.5 by 8 to 10 centimeters, with pinnate veins arising from near the base. The branches of the midrib number about 3 pairs by 2, and the leaves have dark granular dots. The petiole is very short at only 3 millimeters long and has a crisped or wavy wing extending to the base. The spikes are solitary, positioned opposite the leaves, thread-like, about 1 by 120 millimeters, with rather loosely spaced flowers. The peduncle is 1 centimeter long. The floral bracts are round-oval. The berries are globe-shaped, dark red, and glandular. The stigma is located near the tip.

== Taxonomy and naming ==
It was described in 1929 by William Trelease in Contributions from the United States National Herbarium 6. The epithet crispipetiola comes from the Latin crispus meaning "curled" or "wavy" and petiolus meaning "leaf stalk," referring to the crisped or wavy wing on the petiole.

== Distribution and habitat ==
It is endemic in Colombia, Costa Rica, and Panama. In Colombia, it found at an altitude of 300 - 1150 meters. It grows as an epiphyte and is a herb. It grows on wet tropical biomes.

== Conservation ==
This species is assessed as Threatened.
