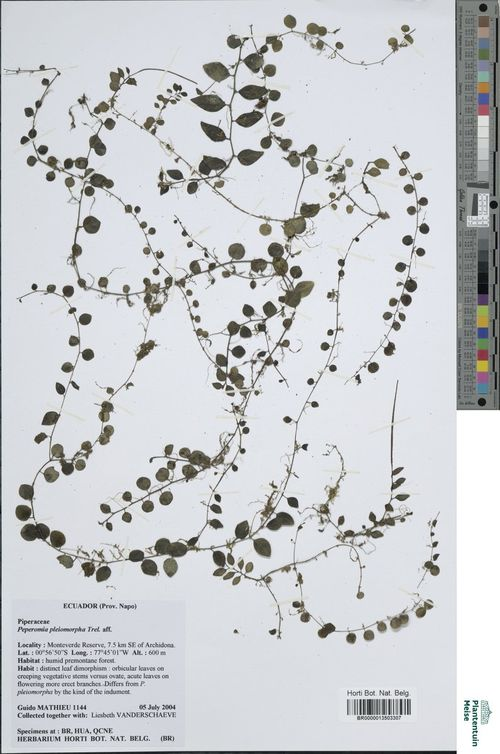

Scientific classification
- Kingdom: Plantae
- Clade: Tracheophytes
- Clade: Angiosperms
- Clade: Magnoliids
- Order: Piperales
- Family: Piperaceae
- Genus: Peperomia
- Species: P. pleiomorpha

Binomial name
- Peperomia pleiomorpha Trel.

= Peperomia pleiomorpha =

Species of plant

Peperomia pleiomorpha is a species of terrestrial or epiphytic herb in the genus Peperomia that is native to Peru. It grows on wet tropical biomes. Its conservation status is threatened.

== Description ==
The type specimen were collected at Sangabán, Peru.

Peperomia pleiomorpha is a small, stoloniferous-ascending, epiphytic herb with a stem 1 mm thick, loosely and minutely pilose. The leaves on the stolons are round-obovate and minute, while those on the flowering branches are gradually larger and elliptic-ovate to lanceolate, measuring 10–15 mm long and 3–10 mm wide. They are obtuse with a somewhat acute base, minutely appressed-pubescent, and obscurely 3–5-nerved. The loosely pubescent petiole is 3–5 mm long. The spikes are 30 mm long and 1 mm thick, with rather densely inserted flowers, and are borne on a filiform, more or less pubescent peduncle 5–10 mm long.

== Taxonomy and naming ==
It was described in 1936 by William Trelease in Publications of the Field Museum of Natural History, Botanical Series 13, from specimens collected by Willibald Lechler.

The epithet is derived from the Greek pleion and morphē, meaning "many-formed," referring to the variable leaf shapes found on different parts of the plant.

== Distribution and habitat ==
It is native to Peru. It grows as a terrestrial or epiphytic herb. It grows on wet tropical biomes.

== Conservation ==
This species has been assessed as threatened in a preliminary report.
