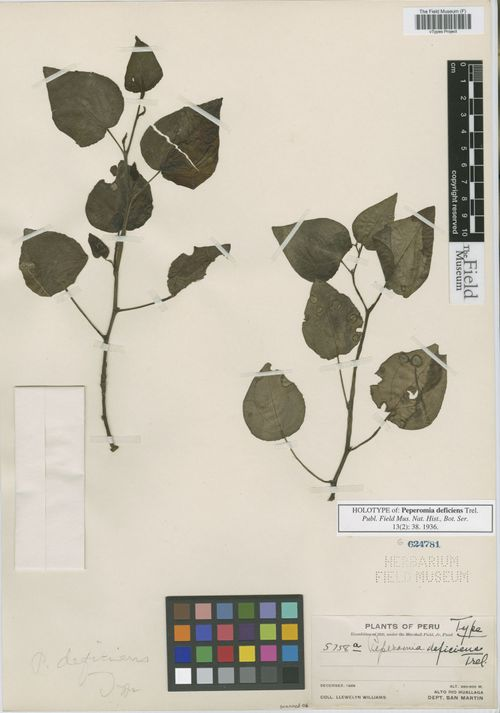

Scientific classification
- Kingdom: Plantae
- Clade: Tracheophytes
- Clade: Angiosperms
- Clade: Magnoliids
- Order: Piperales
- Family: Piperaceae
- Genus: Peperomia
- Species: P. deficiens

Binomial name
- Peperomia deficiens Trel.

= Peperomia deficiens =

Species of flowering plant

Peperomia deficiens is a species of epiphyte in the genus Peperomia that is endemic in Peru. It grows on wet tropical biomes. Its conservation status is Threatened.

== Description ==
The type specimen were collected near Alto Río Huallaga, Peru, at an altitude of 360–900 meters (1,180–2,950 ft).

Peperomia deficiens is a moderately tall, unbranched, glabrous herb with slender stems. The alternate leaves are somewhat deltoid-ovate, with a rounded to subtruncate base. They are distinctly peltate or, in some cases, shortly cordate and epeltate, measuring 5–5.5 cm (2.0–2.2 in) long and 3.5–4.5 cm (1.4–1.8 in) wide. The leaves are about 7-nerved, thin when dry, and have a brownish granular texture on the underside. The slender petiole is 2–4 cm (0.8–1.6 in) long. The inflorescence was not seen on the type specimen.

== Taxonomy and naming ==
It was described in 1936 by William Trelease in Publications of the Field Museum of Natural History, Botanical Series 13, from specimens collected by Llewelyn Williams. It got its epithet from the Latin wikt:deficiens, referring to the absence of inflorescences on the type collection.

== Distribution and habitat ==
It is endemic in Peru. It grows on a epiphyte environment and is a herb. It grows on wet tropical biomes.

== Conservation ==
This species is assessed as Threatened, in a preliminary report.
