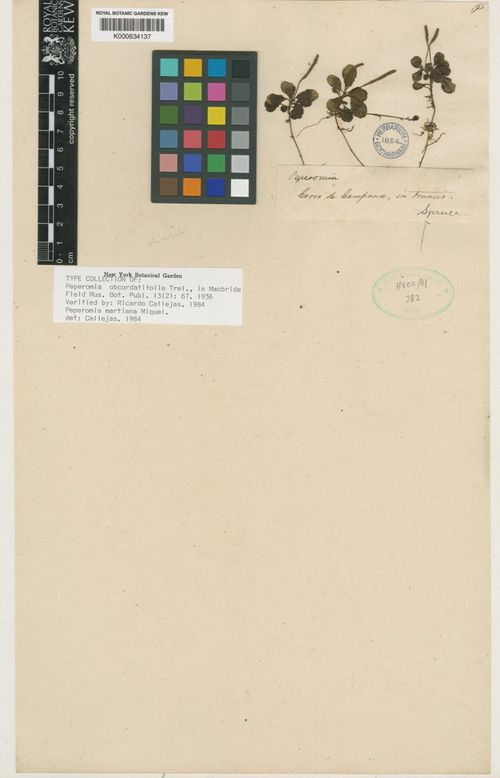

Scientific classification
- Kingdom: Plantae
- Clade: Tracheophytes
- Clade: Angiosperms
- Clade: Magnoliids
- Order: Piperales
- Family: Piperaceae
- Genus: Peperomia
- Species: P. obcordatifolia

Binomial name
- Peperomia obcordatifolia Trel.

= Peperomia obcordatifolia =

Species of plant

Peperomia obcordatifolia is a species of terrestrial or epiphytic herb in the genus Peperomia that is native to Peru. It grows on wet tropical biomes. Its conservation status is threatened.

== Description ==
The type specimen were collected at Cerro de Campana, Peru.

Peperomia obcordatifolia is a small, glabrous, creeping then ascending herb with a filiform stem. The leaves are alternate, crowded at the stem apex, obovate, more or less slightly notched at the tip, with an acute base, measuring 10 mm long and 8 mm wide. They are 3-nerved. The petiole is very short. The terminal spikes are 15 mm long and 1 mm thick, borne on a peduncle barely 10 mm long. The berries are round-ovoid, obliquely apiculate, with a subapical stigma.

== Taxonomy and naming ==
It was described in 1936 by William Trelease in Publications of the Field Museum of Natural History, Botanical Series 13, from specimens collected by Richard Spruce.

The epithet combines obcordatus (inversely heart-shaped, referring to the notched apex) and folia, describing the leaf shape with its characteristic emarginate tip.

== Distribution and habitat ==
It is native to Peru. It grows as a terrestrial or epiphytic herb. It grows on wet tropical biomes.

== Conservation ==
This species has been assessed as threatened in a preliminary report.
