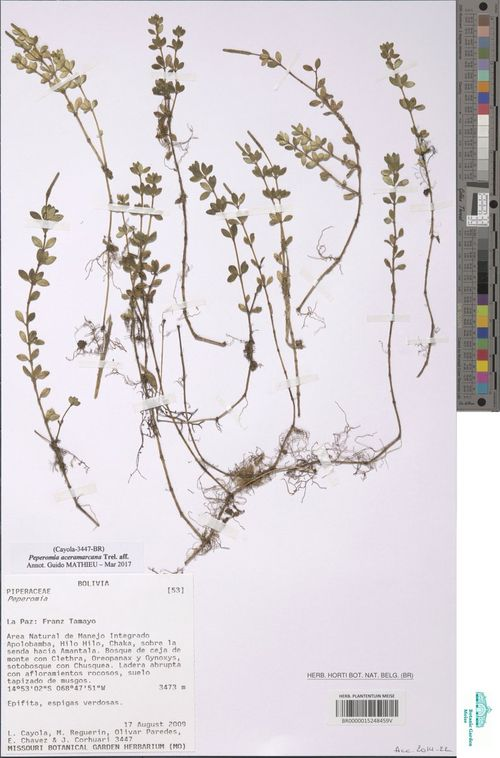

Scientific classification
- Kingdom: Plantae
- Clade: Tracheophytes
- Clade: Angiosperms
- Clade: Magnoliids
- Order: Piperales
- Family: Piperaceae
- Genus: Peperomia
- Species: P. aceramarcana

Binomial name
- Peperomia aceramarcana Trel.

Synonyms
- Peperomia pseudosilvarum Yunck.

= Peperomia aceramarcana =

Species of flowering plant

Peperomia aceramarcana is a species of epiphyte in the genus Peperomia that is endemic in Bolivia. It grows on wet tropical biomes. Its conservation status is Threatened.

== Description ==
The type specimen where collected near Rio Aceramarcana, Bolivia, at an altitude of 10,800 ft (3,300 m).

Peperomia aceramarcana is a delicate creeping herb with stout erect branches and a slender stem 1 mm thick, covered with fine short hairs. The leaves are arranged 2–6 at a node, subelliptic and somewhat obtuse at both ends, small at 2 × 7–10 mm, hairless but finely fringed with hairs along the margin, glandular-granular beneath, and very obscurely subpinnately veined. The petiole is scarcely 1 mm long and nearly hairless. The terminal spikes are scarcely 1 mm thick by 25 mm long, grooved, with flowers arranged in loose zones; the peduncle is thread-like, about 10 mm long and covered with fine short hairs. The bracts are round-peltate. The ovary is ovoid, impressed, with a small sharp point (mucronulate), and subapical stigma.

== Taxonomy and naming ==
It was described in 1928 by William Trelease in Bulletin of the Torrey Botanical Club 55, from specimens collected by George Henry Hamilton Tate. It got its name from the location where the type specimen was collected.

== Subtaxa ==
Following subtaxa are accepted.

- Peperomia aceramarcana var. variifolia Yunck.

== Distribution and habitat ==
It is endemic in Bolivia. It grows on a epiphyte environment and is a herb. It grows on wet tropical biomes.

== Conservation ==
This species is assessed as Threatened, in a preliminary report.
