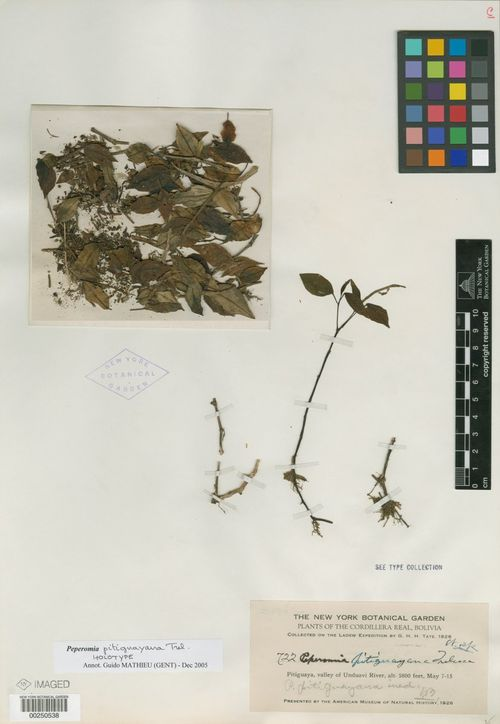

Scientific classification
- Kingdom: Plantae
- Clade: Tracheophytes
- Clade: Angiosperms
- Clade: Magnoliids
- Order: Piperales
- Family: Piperaceae
- Genus: Peperomia
- Species: P. pitiguayana

Binomial name
- Peperomia pitiguayana Trel.

= Peperomia pitiguayana =

Species of flowering plant

Peperomia pitiguayana is a species of epiphyte in the genus Peperomia that is endemic in Bolivia. It grows on wet tropical biomes. Its conservation status is Threatened.

== Description ==
The type specimen where collected near Pitiguaya, Bolivia, at an altitude of 5,800 ft (1,800 m).

Peperomia pitiguayana is a moderately small, stoloniferous, hairless herb with alternate leaves that are elliptic or broadly lanceolate, somewhat acute or acutely pointed, mostly acute at base, moderately small at 1 × 2–2.5 cm or 1.5 × 3–3.5 cm. They dry firm and are 5-nerved. The petiole is 5–10 mm long. The spikes are opposite the leaves, young at the time of description, 1 mm thick by 30–50 mm long, and very closely flowered; the peduncle is thread-like, 10–15 mm long. The bracts are round-peltate.

== Taxonomy and naming ==
It was described in 1928 by William Trelease in Bulletin of the Torrey Botanical Club 55, from specimens collected by George Henry Hamilton Tate. It got its name from the location where the type specimen was collected.

== Distribution and habitat ==
It is endemic in Bolivia. It grows on a epiphyte environment and is a herb. It grows on wet tropical biomes.

== Conservation ==
This species is assessed as Threatened, in a preliminary report.
