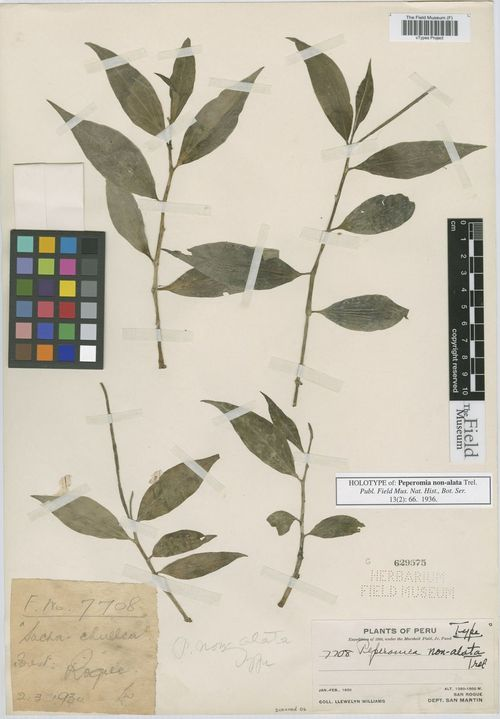

Scientific classification
- Kingdom: Plantae
- Clade: Tracheophytes
- Clade: Angiosperms
- Clade: Magnoliids
- Order: Piperales
- Family: Piperaceae
- Genus: Peperomia
- Species: P. non-alata

Binomial name
- Peperomia non-alata Trel.

= Peperomia non-alata =

Species of plant

Peperomia non-alata is a species of terrestrial or epiphytic herb in the genus Peperomia that is native to Peru. It grows on wet tropical biomes. Its conservation status is Threatened.

== Description ==
The type specimen were collected at San Roque, Peru at an altitude of 1300 - 1500 meters above sea level.

Peperomia non-alata is a medium-sized, simple, erect, glabrous herb with a stem 3 mm thick that is not winged (non-alate). The alternate leaves are lanceolate, with a long-attenuate apex and an acute base, measuring 7–9 cm long and 2–2.5 cm wide. They are 5-nerved, with the midrib obscurely branched, and when dry are dark green and somewhat opaque. The petiole is 5 mm long. The spikes are terminal and from the upper axils, slender, 90 mm long, and borne on a 10 mm peduncle.

== Taxonomy and naming ==
It was described in 1936 by William Trelease in Publications of the Field Museum of Natural History, Botanical Series 13, from specimens collected by Llewelyn Williams.

The epithet non-alata is Latin for "not winged," directly stating that the stem lacks the wings.

== Distribution and habitat ==
It is native to Peru. It grows as a terrestrial or epiphytic herb. It grows on wet tropical biomes.

== Conservation ==
This species is assessed as Threatened, in a preliminary report.
