= Peperomia vana =

Scientific classification
- Kingdom: Plantae
- Clade: Embryophytes
- Clade: Tracheophytes
- Clade: Angiosperms
- Clade: Magnoliids
- Order: Piperales
- Family: Piperaceae
- Genus: Peperomia
- Species: P. vana

Binomial name
- Peperomia vana Trel.

Species of epiphyte

Peperomia vana is a species of epiphyte from the genus 'Peperomia'.

== Etymology ==
The word "vana" came from the Latin word "vānus", which means empty, pointless, boastful, and deceptive.

== Distribution ==
Peperomia vana is native to one country, which is Peru. Specimens can be found at a Verbatim elevation of 4593-5577 ft.

- Peru
  - Junín
    - Schunke Hacienda
