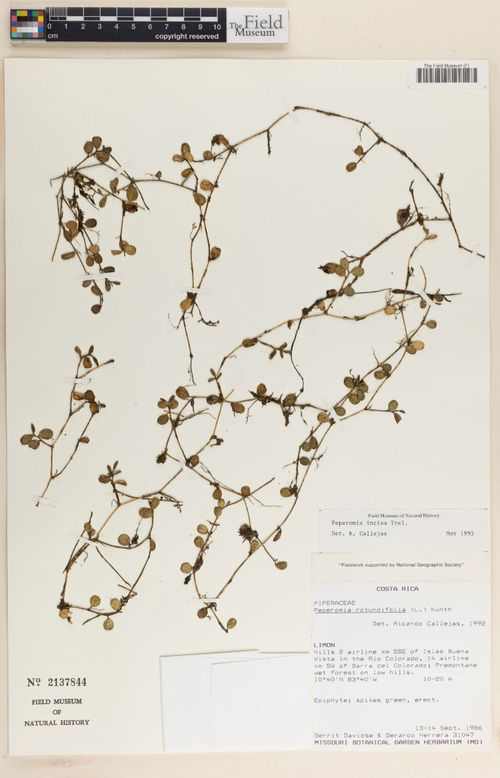

Scientific classification
- Kingdom: Plantae
- Clade: Tracheophytes
- Clade: Angiosperms
- Clade: Magnoliids
- Order: Piperales
- Family: Piperaceae
- Genus: Peperomia
- Species: P. incisa

Binomial name
- Peperomia incisa Trel.

Synonyms
- Peperomia aneura Yunck.

= Peperomia incisa =

Species of epiphyte

Peperomia incisa is a species of epiphyte in the genus Peperomia that is endemic from Nicaragua to Colombia. It grows on wet tropical biomes. Its conservation status is Threatened.

== Description ==
The type specimen was collected in Quebrada Serena, Costa Rica at an altitude of 700 meters.

Peperomia incisa is a rather small, creeping, hairless herb that grows on trees. The stem is thread-like. The leaves are alternate, shaped either obovate or oblong-obovate, with a notched tip and an acute base. They are small at 5 by 7 to 7 by 13 millimeters, opaque, with indistinct 3 nerves and impressed small dots beneath. The petiole is 3 to 5 millimeters long. The inflorescence is unknown.

== Taxonomy and naming ==
It was described in 1929 by William Trelease in Contributions from the United States National Herbarium 6. The epithet incisa comes from the Latin incisus meaning "cut into" or "notched", referring to the notched tip of the leaves.

== Distribution and habitat ==
It is endemic in Nicaragua to Colombia. It grows as an epiphyte and is a herb. It grows on wet tropical biomes.

== Conservation ==
This species is assessed as Threatened.
