= Peperomia litana =

Conservation status
- Critically Endangered (IUCN 3.1)

Scientific classification
- Kingdom: Plantae
- Clade: Tracheophytes
- Clade: Angiosperms
- Clade: Magnoliids
- Order: Piperales
- Family: Piperaceae
- Genus: Peperomia
- Species: P. litana

Binomial name
- Peperomia litana Trel. & Yunck.

Species of flowering plant

Peperomia litana is a species of plant in the family Piperaceae. It is endemic to Ecuador. It is a fairly small, glabrous herb with alternating subovate-elliptic leaves measuring approximately 1.5 by 2.5 cm. It resembles Peperomia vallensis and Peperomia suratana but differs from these by the shape of the leaves.
