= Quercus rekonis =

Conservation status
- Data Deficient (IUCN 3.1)

Scientific classification
- Kingdom: Plantae
- Clade: Embryophytes
- Clade: Tracheophytes
- Clade: Spermatophytes
- Clade: Angiosperms
- Clade: Eudicots
- Clade: Rosids
- Order: Fagales
- Family: Fagaceae
- Genus: Quercus
- Subgenus: Quercus subg. Quercus
- Section: Quercus sect. Quercus
- Species: Q. rekonis

Binomial name
- Quercus rekonis Trel.

Species of oak tree

Quercus rekonis is a species of oak in the subgenus Quercus indigenous to Mexico. It was described in 1924 by William Trelease. It is most commonly found in the Mexican state of Oaxaca, but can be found throughout much of western Mexico. Quercus rekonis grows in a subtropical biome.

== Description ==
=== Leaves ===
The leaves of Quercus rekonis measure 16-17 centimetres in length and 4.5-6 centimetres in width. Quercus reckonis is deciduous. The leaves of Quercus rekonis are oboval-lanceolate or oblanceolate, the apex is attenuate. The leaf base is narrowly rounded. The leaves of Quercus rekonis have wavy margins with apical half-toothed with 4 pairs of obtuse teeth. The tops of the leaves are hairless with a dull blue-green colour. The bottoms of the leaves contain sparse whitish tomentum. The leaves have 10-12 vein pairs at a 42° angle with the midrib. The leaves petioles are 8 millimetres long.

=== Fruit ===
Quercus rekonis produces ovoid, mucronate acorns. The acorns are typically silky. Quercus rekonis produces 3-4 acorns together at the end of a 6-7 cm long peduncle. The cups of the acorns are scaly, half-round and tomentose. The cups are 1 centimetre in diameter. The acorns mature first year.
