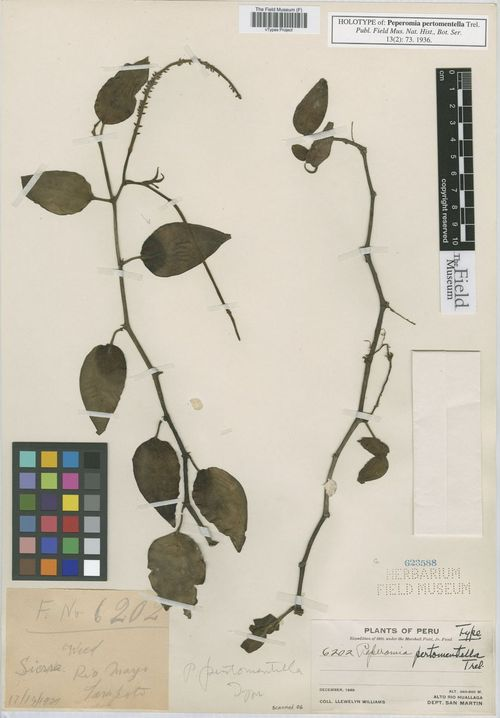

Scientific classification
- Kingdom: Plantae
- Clade: Tracheophytes
- Clade: Angiosperms
- Clade: Magnoliids
- Order: Piperales
- Family: Piperaceae
- Genus: Peperomia
- Species: P. pertomentella

Binomial name
- Peperomia pertomentella Trel.

= Peperomia pertomentella =

Species of plant

Peperomia pertomentella is a species of terrestrial or epiphytic herb in the genus Peperomia that is native to Peru. It grows on wet tropical biomes. Its conservation status is threatened.

== Description ==
The type specimen were collected at Peru, Peru.

Peperomia pertomentella is a rather large, diffuse, terrestrial, sparsely branched herb with a rust-colored tomentulose indumentum. The alternate leaves are ovate, more or less acuminate, with a rounded to subcordulate base, measuring 4–6 cm long and 2.5–4 cm wide. They have obscure pinnate venation and, when dry, are brown and leathery. The petiole is 1–2 cm long. The sympodial spikes, one or two, terminate a 1 cm long, 2-bracteate branchlet. They are 90–100 mm long and 1 mm thick, with a peduncle 10–15 mm long. The berries are oblong, narrowed at the apex, and bear a small shield (scutulum), with a central stigma.

== Taxonomy and naming ==
It was described in 1936 by William Trelease in Publications of the Field Museum of Natural History, Botanical Series 13, from specimens collected by Llewelyn Williams.

The epithet combines the Latin intensive prefix per- with tomentellus (somewhat tomentose), meaning "very or completely covered with fine, matted hairs."

== Distribution and habitat ==
It is native to Peru. It grows as a terrestrial or epiphytic herb. It grows on wet tropical biomes.

== Conservation ==
This species has been assessed as threatened in a preliminary report.
