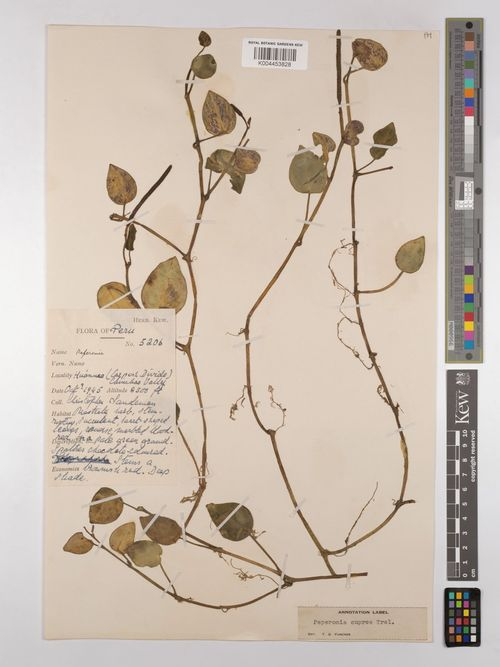

Scientific classification
- Kingdom: Plantae
- Clade: Tracheophytes
- Clade: Angiosperms
- Clade: Magnoliids
- Order: Piperales
- Family: Piperaceae
- Genus: Peperomia
- Species: P. cuprea

Binomial name
- Peperomia cuprea Trel.

= Peperomia cuprea =

Species of flowering plant

Peperomia cuprea is a species of epiphyte in the genus Peperomia that is endemic in Peru. It grows on wet tropical biomes. Its conservation status is Threatened.

== Description ==
The type specimen were collected near Chanchamayo Valley, Peru, at an altitude of 1,200 meters (3,900 ft).

Peperomia cuprea is a medium-sized, creeping herb with a stem about 2 mm thick that bears an obscure, evanescent, more or less crisp pubescence. The alternate leaves are ovate, somewhat acuminate, with a rounded base, and are peltate (attached 3–5 mm above the base). They measure 3.5–4.5 cm long and 2–3.5 cm wide, and are opaque, leathery, with obscure multiple pinnate nerves and a narrowly revolute margin. The underside is a distinctive copper color and has silky-ciliate hairs. The petiole is 1–2.5 cm long with a soft, evanescent pubescence. The axillary spikes are 55 mm long and 3 mm thick, with tightly arranged flowers in zones, and are borne on a 2 cm, glabrous peduncle. The small, round-peltate bracts are arranged in pseudowhorls of about 20.

== Taxonomy and naming ==
It was described in 1936 by William Trelease in Publications of the Field Museum of Natural History, Botanical Series 13, from specimens collected by Carlos Schunke. It got its epithet from the Latin cuprea, referring to the copper-colored undersides of the leaves that distinguish this species.

== Subtaxa ==
Following subtaxa are accepted.

- Peperomia cuprea var. cordulifolia Trel.

== Distribution and habitat ==
It is endemic in Peru. It grows on a epiphyte environment and is a herb. It grows on wet tropical biomes.

== Conservation ==
This species is assessed as Threatened, in a preliminary report.
