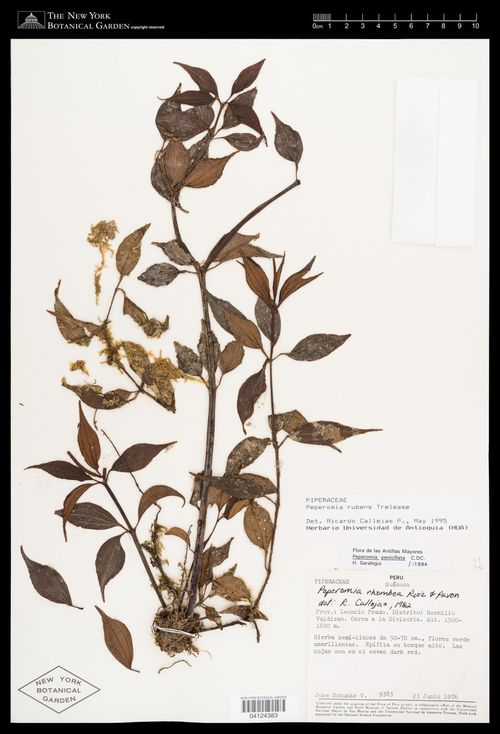

Scientific classification
- Kingdom: Plantae
- Clade: Tracheophytes
- Clade: Angiosperms
- Clade: Magnoliids
- Order: Piperales
- Family: Piperaceae
- Genus: Peperomia
- Species: P. rubens

Binomial name
- Peperomia rubens Trel.

= Peperomia rubens =

Species of flowering plant

Peperomia rubens is a species of epiphyte in the genus Peperomia that is endemic in Peru. It grows on wet tropical biomes. Its conservation status is Not Threatened.

== Description ==
The type specimen was collected near Chanchamayo Valley, Peru, at an altitude of 1,200 meters (3,900 ft).

Peperomia rubens is a rather large, nearly simple, ascending, glabrous herb that turns purplish when dry. The stem is 3 mm thick. The leaves are in whorls of 3. They are lanceolate-elliptic, acutely acuminate, with an acute base, measuring 4–5 cm long and 1.5–2 cm wide, and are 3-nerved with the nerves impressed above and prominent beneath. The slender petiole is 1 cm long. The terminal and upper axillary spikes are 100 mm (3.9 in) long and 2 mm thick or more, with a peduncle 1 cm long.

== Taxonomy and naming ==
It was described in 1936 by William Trelease in Publications of the Field Museum of Natural History, Botanical Series 13, from the specimen collected by Carlos Schunke. The epithet rubens is Latin for "reddish" or "blushing", referring to the purplish coloration of the dried specimens.

== Distribution and habitat ==
It is endemic in Peru. It grows on a epiphyte environment and is a herb. It grows on wet tropical biomes.

== Conservation ==
This species is assessed as Not Threatened.
