= Pseudopalaina =

Scientific classification
- Kingdom: Animalia
- Phylum: Mollusca
- Class: Gastropoda
- Subclass: Caenogastropoda
- Order: Architaenioglossa
- Family: Diplommatinidae
- Genus: Pseudopalaina; Möllendorff, 1898

Genus of gastropods

Pseudopalaina is a genus of small land snails with an operculum, terrestrial gastropod mollusks in the family Diplommatinidae.

== Species ==
Species within the genus Pseudopalaina include:

- Pseudopalaina polymorpha
