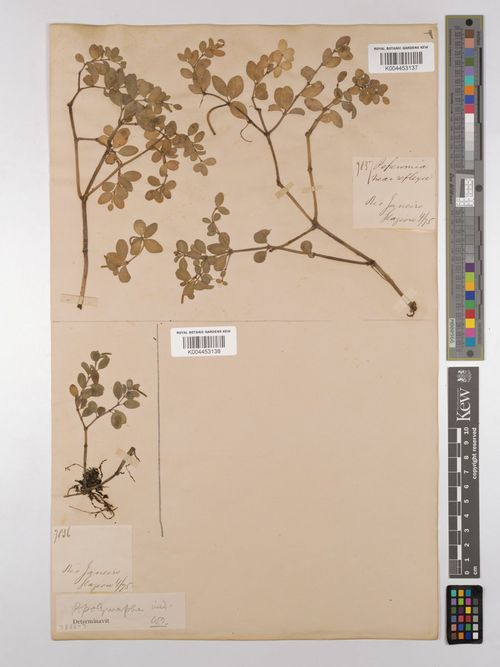

Scientific classification
- Kingdom: Plantae
- Clade: Tracheophytes
- Clade: Angiosperms
- Clade: Magnoliids
- Order: Piperales
- Family: Piperaceae
- Genus: Peperomia
- Species: P. polymorpha

Binomial name
- Peperomia polymorpha Trel.

= Peperomia polymorpha =

Species of plant

Peperomia polymorpha is a species of terrestrial or epiphytic herb in the genus Peperomia that is native to Peru. It grows on wet tropical biomes. Its conservation status is Threatened.

== Description ==
The type specimen were collected at Urubamba Valley, Peru at an altitude of 3000 meters above sea level.

Peperomia polymorpha is a small, rhizomatous-erect, tree-dwelling herb with a slender stem covered in crisp pubescence. The alternate leaves are round-obovate to elliptic, obtuse, with an acute base, measuring 6–8 mm long and 3–6 mm wide. They are crisp-pubescent above when young and obscurely 3-nerved. The glabrous petiole is about 3 mm long. The terminal spikes are 30 mm long, with a very short, glabrous peduncle. The floral bracts are relatively large and round-peltate.

== Taxonomy and naming ==
It was described in 1936 by William Trelease in Publications of the Field Museum of Natural History, Botanical Series 13, from specimens collected by Fortunato L. Herrera.

The epithet is derived from the Greek poly and morphē, meaning "many forms," referring to the variable leaf morphology within the species.

== Distribution and habitat ==
It is native to Peru. It grows as a terrestrial or epiphytic herb. It grows on wet tropical biomes.

== Conservation ==
This species is assessed as Threatened, in a preliminary report.
