= Pseudopalaina polymorpha =

Conservation status
- Critically Endangered (IUCN 3.1)

Scientific classification
- Kingdom: Animalia
- Phylum: Mollusca
- Class: Gastropoda
- Subclass: Caenogastropoda
- Order: Architaenioglossa
- Family: Diplommatinidae
- Genus: Pseudopalaina
- Species: P. polymorpha

Binomial name
- Pseudopalaina polymorpha (Crosse, 1866)

Species of gastropod

Pseudopalaina polymorpha is a species of small land snail with an operculum, a terrestrial gastropod mollusk in the family Diplommatinidae. This species is endemic to Palau.
