= James Francis Macbride =

American botanist (1892–1976)

- Born: 19 May 1891; Rock Valley, Iowa
- Died: 16 June 1976 (aged 85); Riverside, California
- Occupation: Botanist
- Known for: The Flora of Peru program
- Scientific career
- Author abbrev. (botany): J.F.Macbr.

James Francis Macbride (19 May 1892 – 16 June 1976) was an American botanist who devoted most of his professional life to the study of the flora of Peru.

== Early life and education ==
Born on 19 May 1891 in Rock Valley, Iowa, MacBride graduated from the University of Wyoming in 1914 and worked briefly at the Gray Herbarium, Harvard University.

== Career ==
In 1921, Macbride joined the staff of the Department of Botany at Field Museum of Natural History, Chicago, to head the nascent Flora of Peru program. Peru had been selected as the center of floristic research by C. F. Millspaugh, the museum's first Curator of Botany. In 1922, Macbride and his assistant William Featherstone embarked on the first of two expeditions to Peru. They initially collected in the highland regions of the Departments of Lima, Junín, Huánuco, and Pasco. Macbride returned the following year to the Huánuco region and the Río Ucayali.

For a decade from 1929, Macbride visited all the major herbaria of Europe to photograph types of tropical American flora preserved in herbaria, accumulating photographs of over 40,000 specimens. These photographs were to prove of particular importance, as many of the specimens held in German herbaria were later destroyed in the Allied bombing campaigns of World War II. Expeditions to Peru continued in his absence, and by 1936 the Field Museum's herbarium held over 33,000 Peruvian plant specimens, the largest such collection in the world. in 1936, publication of the Flora of Peru began, and continued for another 24 years. In the late 1940s, Macbride moved to California, where he continued his work on the Flora at the University of California and at Stanford University, publishing his last family treatment in 1960, leaving only 20 families out of 180 untreated in the series.

== Personal life and death ==
Macbride died aged 84 on 16 June 1976 at Riverside, California.

== Eponymy ==
Macbride is commemorated by the plant genus of Macbrideina Standley and numerous other species; such as Tephrosia macbrideana R.T.Queiroz, G.P.Lewis & A.M.G.Azevedo.

== Works ==
Macbride, J. F. (1936-1960). Flora of Peru, Field Museum of Natural History, Chicago.

== See also ==
- Category:Taxa named by James Francis Macbride
