= William Trelease =

American entomologist (1857–1945)

- Born: February 22, 1857; Mount Vernon, New York
- Died: January 1, 1945 (aged 87)
- Education: Cornell University; Harvard University
- Scientific career
- Fields: Botany
- Workplaces: Harvard University; University of Wisconsin; Washington University; University of Illinois
- Author abbrev. (botany): Trel.

William Trelease (February 22, 1857 – January 1, 1945) was an American botanist, entomologist, explorer, writer and educator. This botanist is denoted by the author abbreviation Trel. when citing a botanical name.

Trelease was born in Mount Vernon, New York. He graduated B.S. from Cornell University in 1880 and a D.Sc from Harvard in 1884. He was instructor in botany at Harvard University 1880–81, instructor in botany at the University of Wisconsin–Madison 1881–83, and professor of botany there from 1883 to 1885. He was also special lecturer in botany at Johns Hopkins University, and in charge of the summer school of botany at Harvard, during 1883–84. He was Engelmann professor of botany at Washington University in St. Louis from 1885 to 1913, and appointed director of the Missouri Botanical Garden from 1889 to 1912. He was active in various municipal and professional academic associations: he was the first President of the Botanical Society of America in 1894, and served as president for a second time in 1918. In 1903, he was elected to the American Philosophical Society. From 1913 to 1926 he was professor of botany and head of department at the University of Illinois Urbana-Champaign. Trelease Hall is named after him.

Trelease was amongst the scientists on the two-month expedition to Alaska led by Edward Henry Harriman in 1899. In 1932 he led a botanical expedition to the Canary Isles and Spain, and in 1933 an expedition to New Zealand.

Trelease wrote many scientific articles and monographs. His work on the Piperaceae of Northern South America, left unfinished at his death, was completed by his student Truman G. Yuncker. He also wrote several more popular botanical and gardening books, such as Plant materials of decorative gardening (1917) and Winter Botany (1918).
