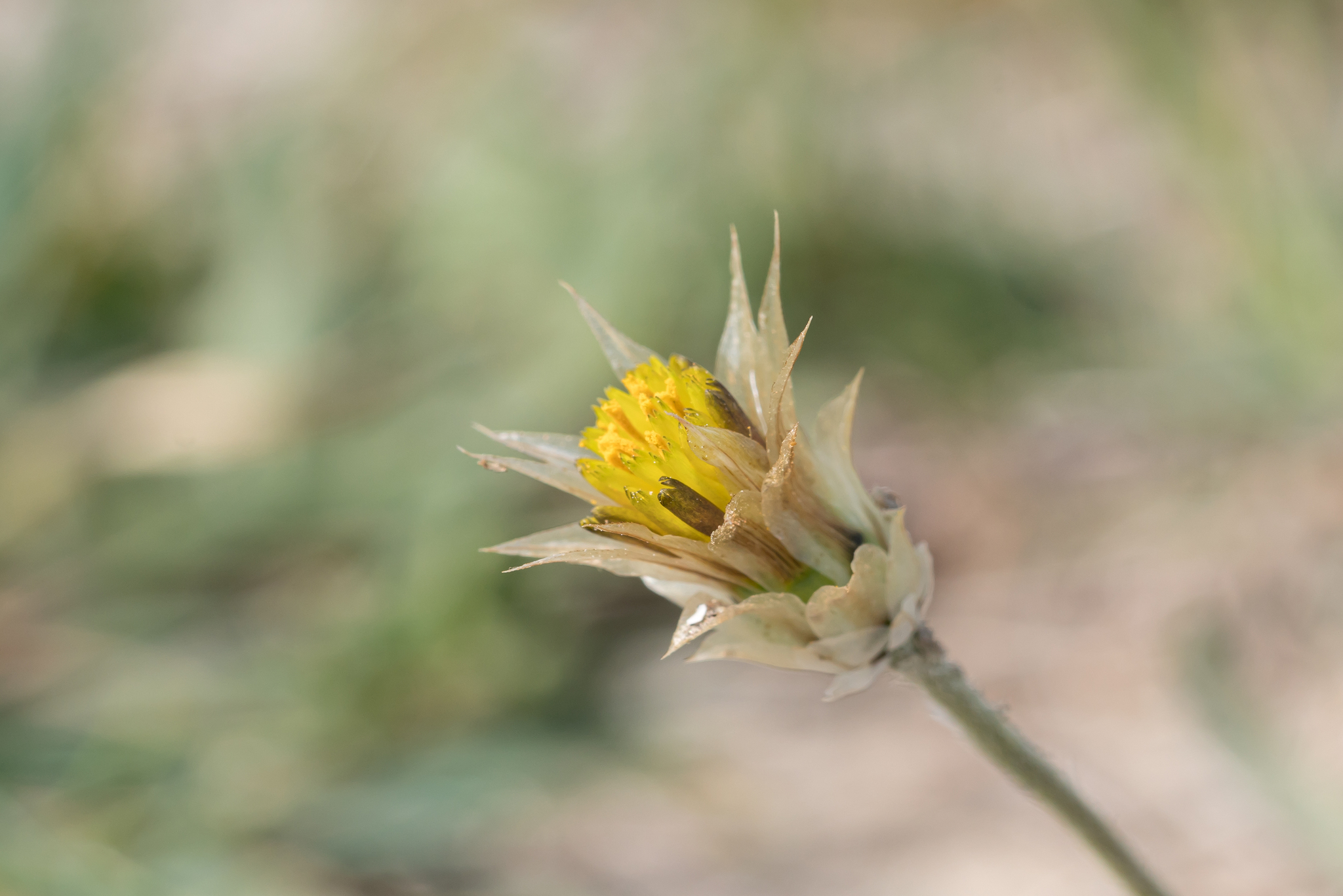

Scientific classification
- Kingdom: Plantae
- Clade: Tracheophytes
- Clade: Angiosperms
- Clade: Eudicots
- Clade: Asterids
- Order: Asterales
- Family: Asteraceae
- Genus: Catananche
- Species: C. lutea

Binomial name
- Catananche lutea L.

Synonyms
- Piptocephalum carpholepis Sch.Bip.

= Catananche lutea =

Species of flowering plant

Catananche lutea, is a woolly annual plant, in the family Asteraceae, with most leaves in a basal rosette, and some smaller leaves on the stems at the base of the branches. Seated horizontal flowerheads develop early on under the rosette leaves. Later, not or sparingly branching erect stems grow to 8–40 cm high, carrying solitary flowerheads at their tips with a papery involucre whitish to beige, reaching beyond the yellow ligulate florets. Flowers are present between April and June. This plant is unique for the five different types of seed it develops, few larger seeds from the basal flowerheads, which remain in the soil, and smaller seeds from the flowerheads above ground that may be spread by the wind or remain in the flowerhead when it breaks from the dead plant. This phenomenon is known as amphicarpy. The seeds germinate immediately, but in one type, germination is postponed. It naturally occurs around the Mediterranean. Sources in English sometimes refer to this species as yellow succory.

== Description ==
Catananche lutea is a low to medium height (usually 8–40 cm or 3-16 in) annual herbaceous plant, with a leaf rosette. This species is diploid and has eighteen chromosomes (2n = 18).

=== Leaves, stems ===
Young plants above ground consist of a rosette with many linear to narrowly elliptic leaves with the widest point at, before or beyond midlength 3–27 cm long and 0.7–2 cm wide, with an entire margin or with a few widely distanced teeth, an acute or obtuse tip, and the base narrowing, pale green in color on both surfaces due to the pubescent hairs. Young plants produce seated, horizontally oriented cleistogamic flowerheads under the rosette leaves. Later, erect, weakly branched or unbranched flowering stems develop, which are covered in a white layer of pilose hairs. These stems carry few shorter pale green leaves which are increasingly smaller towards the top, at the foot of the branches.

=== Flowerheads and florets ===
The terminal branches of the stem are up to 20 cm long and mostly do not carry bracts. Two types of flowerhead (or capitula) occur: early – probably cleistogamous – subterranean flowerheads at the base under the rosette leaves, which have between one and three florets, and capitula on the stems, which have many florets. The papery whitish or beige bracts, sometimes with a dark midvein or base, surround each flowerhead and form a bell-shaped involucre of 1.5–3 cm long, and 0.75–1.5 cm in diameter. The involucral bracts on the outside are egg-shaped, 4–5 mm long and about 2.5 mm wide, while the inner ones are more narrow, 9–20 mm long and 3–6 mm wide, with a pointy or tapering tip. The common base of the florets (called receptacle) is set with bristles. The yellow corolla of the aerial ligulate florets is 1.25–1.5 mm long, while the tube carries long, straight, soft hairs (or pilose). The tube that is formed by the five fused anthers is 2–3 mm long, the tip squared-off.

=== Fruit and seed ===
The one-seeded indehiscent fruits called cypselas are five-ribbed, with five pappus scales on top. Cypselas from subterranean capitula are larger (4–5 mm long) and heavier, more or less ovate in shape as seen from the side and with erect, about 3 mm long pappus scales, and come in two distinct types, one about 10 mg, glabrous and whitish in color, that shows quick germination, the other about 7.3 mg, wrinkled, hairy and brown with delayed germination. Besides these two types of subterranean seeds, there are three types of seeds produced by the aerial flowerheads. Cypselas from the aerial flowerheads germinate quickly under favorable conditions, are smaller (about 3 mm long), lighter (about 3.3 mg), with diverging pappus scales, and come in three distinct types. The peripherous cypselas are about ovate, glabrous, whitish in color and having about 3 mm long pappus scales, subtended by an involucral bract and remain in the flowerhead until it disintegrates. The central cypselas are brown, conical with the narrow end at the base, heavily wrinkled and hairy, with about 1 cm long pappus scales that end in a long bristle. The third type of aerial cypsela is intermediate between peripherous and central types, and dark green in color.

== Taxonomy ==
Catananche lutea was described by Linnaeus in 1753. In 1860, Carl Heinrich "Bipontinus" Schultz described Piptocephalum carpholepis. Carl Fredrik Nyman in 1879 realised the latter was very close to Linnaeus' species, but still decided to give Schultz's taxon subspecies status.

=== Etymology ===
The simple translation of the root words from the Greek κατάνάγκη (katanagkē), itself a contraction of κατά (kata), "down" and άνάγκη (anagkē), "force", is "compulsion", which is suggested to refer to the use of this plant in love potions, and is reflected in the vernacular name Cupid's dart. The species epithet lutea is the Latin for "yellow".

== Habitat ==
Catananche lutea prefers calcareous (chalky), loamy soils in open, disturbed habitats.

== Ecology ==
The aerial flowers are pollinated by a wide variety of insects, but self-fertilisation occurs, and is probably the only type of fertilisation in the horizontal flowerheads. Catananche lutea has both flower heads on long erect stems (aerial) and flower heads on very short stems between or under the leaves of the basal rosette (subterranean). The subterranean flower heads contain two types of cypsela, while in the aerial flower heads three different types can be found, which are located next to the involucre, encircling the centre and at the centre of the receptacle respectively. The subterranean cypselas occur between February and April, are fewer in number, but much larger and heavier than aerial cypselas. A high proportion of the first type of subterranean cypselas germinates quickly, while in the second type germination is spread over time due to inhibition by hormones from the fruit skin. The cypselas in the aerial flower heads form from April to May and neither shows delayed germination, but the three types differ in the way they disperse. Those bordering the involucre have short and scaly pappus and are subtended by a bract, to be released with the flower head when it breaks free from the dead mother plant, resulting in dispersal over a short distance. The cypselas at the centre of the flower head however carry much longer pappus and dislodge much sooner to be carried off by the wind over larger distances. The third type of aerial cypsela has intermediate pappus and may remain in the flower head or be carried off by the wind. The subterranean cypselas spread germination over time, with one type evolved to extend the presence of this annual into the next growing season at a location of proven suitability, while the other type contributes to the soil seed bank, and so hatches against unfavorable years. The aerial cypselas on the other hand spread the progeny into new areas. Hence, Catananche lutea through its fruits shows different survival strategies by having quick and delayed germination, in situ, short distance and long-distance seed dispersal, self- and cross-fertilization, as well as having some ripe seeds already early on in the growing season.

Catanache lutea grows on vertisols, in a climate with wet winters and dry, hot summers. It can be found in association with Cerinthe major, Convolvulus tricolor, Fedia cornucopia, F. scorpioides, Glossopappus macrotus, Hedysarum coronarium, H. glomeratum, Lavatera trimestris, Malope trifida and Salvia viridis.
