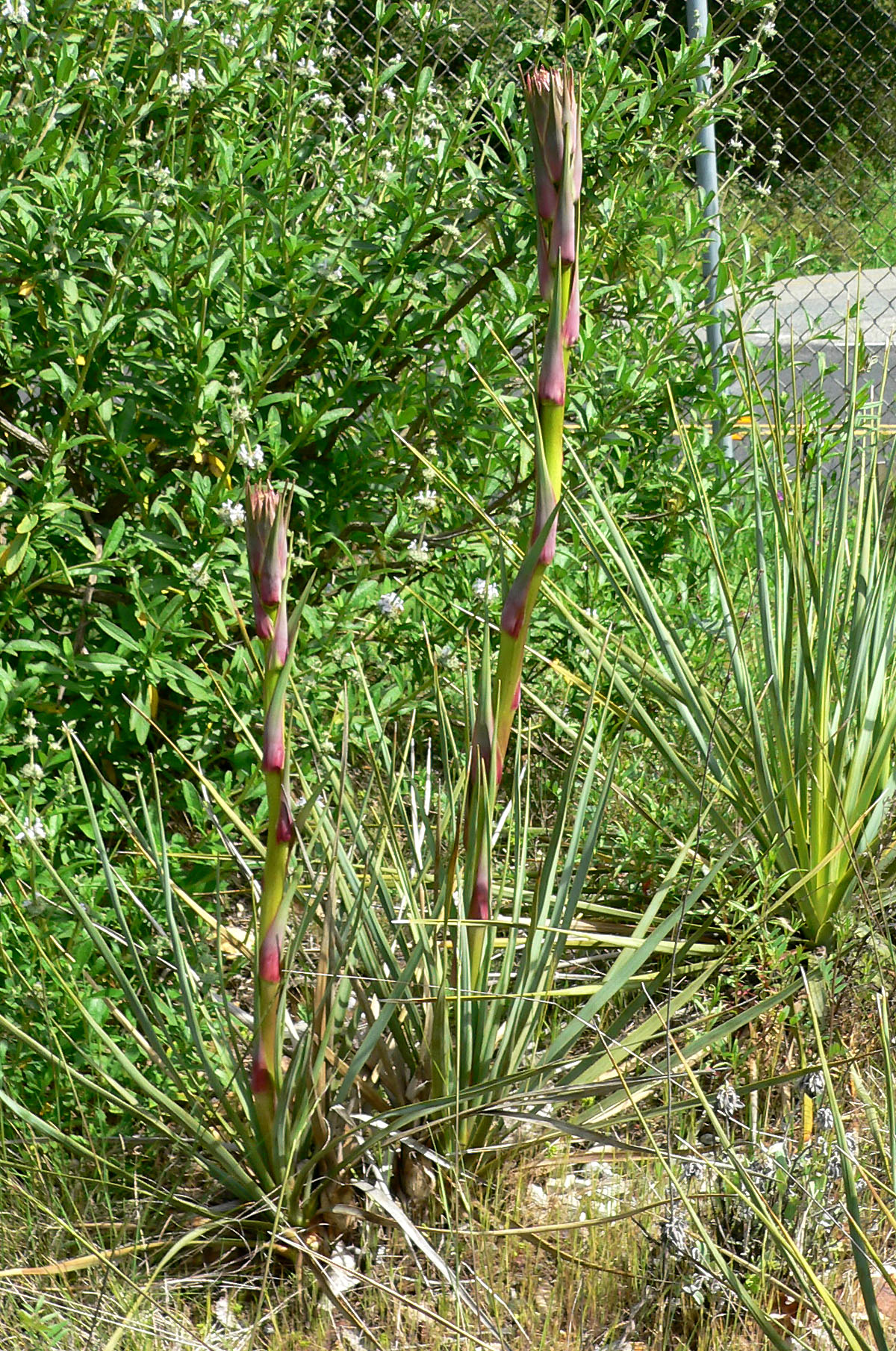

Conservation status
- Vulnerable (NatureServe)

Scientific classification
- Kingdom: Plantae
- Clade: Tracheophytes
- Clade: Angiosperms
- Clade: Monocots
- Order: Asparagales
- Family: Asparagaceae
- Subfamily: Convallarioideae
- Genus: Nolina
- Species: N. cismontana

Binomial name
- Nolina cismontana Dice

= Nolina cismontana =

Species of flowering plant

Nolina cismontana, the chaparral beargrass, chaparral nolina, California beargrass, Peninsular beargrass, or peninsular nolina, is a rare species of flowering plant of the Peninsular and Transverse Ranges in California. It is endemic to (known from) only four counties in Southern California: Los Angeles, Orange, San Diego and Ventura Counties. There are perhaps 15 to 17 occurrences in existence, with a total population estimated between 10,000 and 20,000.

This species, previously classified as a subspecies of Nolina parryi, was elevated to species status in 1995. The type specimen is from Trabuco Canyon. The two species differ in morphology as well as habitat and ecology.

== Distribution ==
Nolina cismontana occurs in coastal mountain ranges in dry chaparral and coastal sage scrub habitat on rocky sandstone and gabbro substrates. By contrast, N. parryi is more often found in woodlands on granite soils.

The plant is in decline throughout most of its range. Threats include destruction and fragmentation of habitat for development, construction of roads, and agriculture, changes in the fire regime, recreational activity, and non-native species.

This species is a "fire-follower", experiencing reproduction and prolific blooming after wildfire.

== Description ==
Nolina cismontana grows to 30 centimetres (0.98 ft) in height but can be much taller, reaching well over 1 metre (3.3 ft). At ground level is a rosette of 30 to 90 long, narrow leaves which measure up to 140 centimetres (4.6 ft) long by 3 centimetres (0.098 ft) wide with a widening at the bases. They are stiff, whiplike, or limp, sometimes waxy in texture, and serrated on the edges.

The inflorescence is a compound panicle of whitish flowers interspersed with pointed bracts. The plant is dioecious, with male and female flowers occurring on separate plants.
