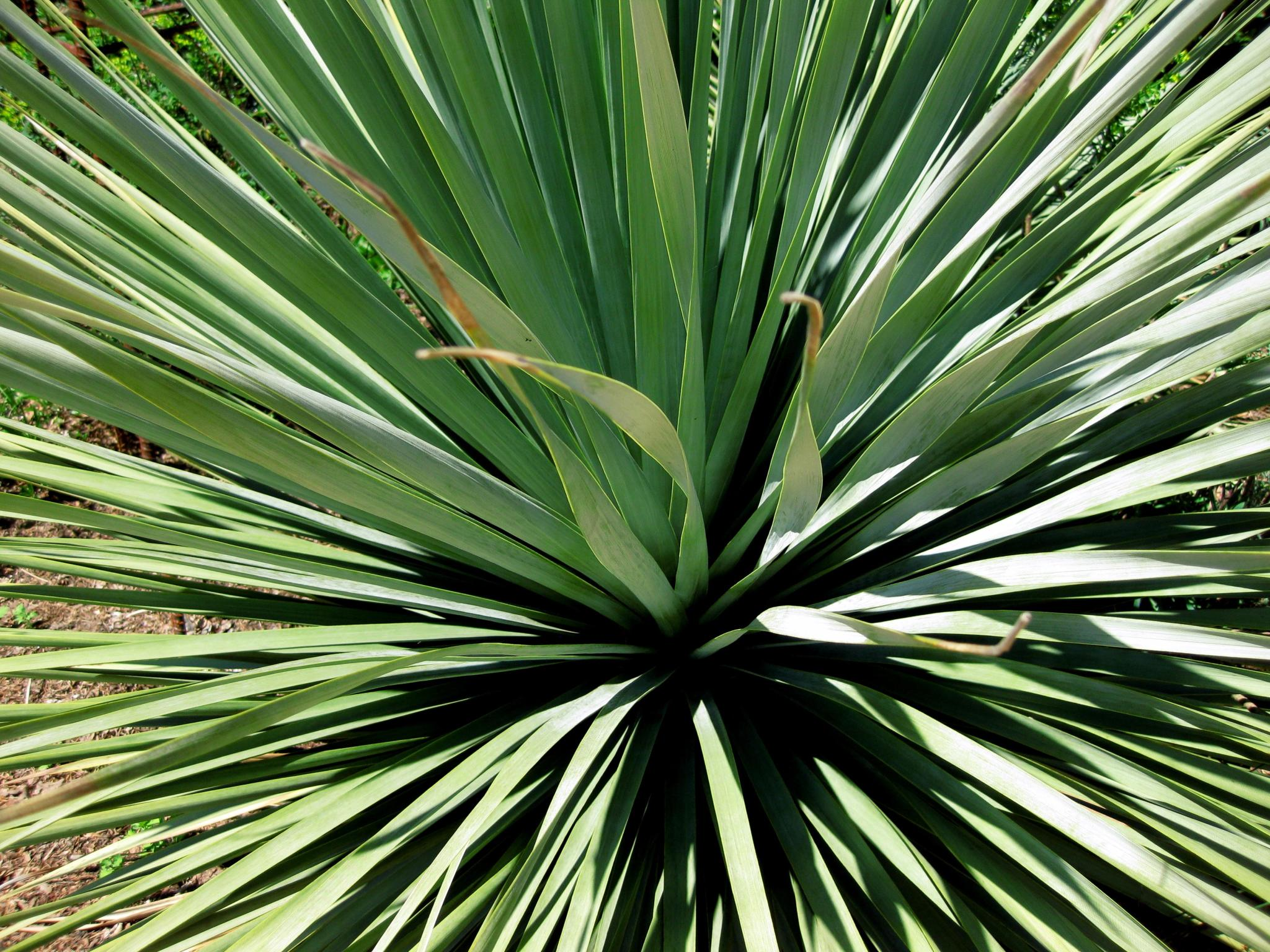

Scientific classification
- Kingdom: Plantae
- Clade: Tracheophytes
- Clade: Angiosperms
- Clade: Monocots
- Order: Asparagales
- Family: Asparagaceae
- Subfamily: Convallarioideae
- Genus: Nolina
- Species: N. nelsonii

Binomial name
- Nolina nelsonii Rose

= Nolina nelsonii =

Species of flowering plant

Nolina nelsonii (Blue Nolina or Nelson's Bear Grass), often misspelled Nolina nelsoni, is a flowering plant in the genus Nolina. The species was first described in 1906; in its genus, it is morphologically most similar to Nolina parryi. This extremely drought-tolerant plant is native to the deserts and montane regions in the State of Tamaulipas in northern/northeastern Mexico. It is known to be cold-hardy to at least −12 °C. It develops a trunk measuring from one to several meters high, making it an arborescent member of its genus. The bluish-green leaves, with finely toothed margins, are borne in dense rosettes, each with up to several hundred stiff linear (narrow) leaves up to 70 centimeters long. It is dioecious; upon reaching sexual maturity, its white-flowered inflorescence appears in Spring. The fruit capsules are around 80 mm in length, containing light-brown, spherical to oblong seeds 2–3 mm in diameter. After blooming, the plant's main trunk dies and multiple lateral trunks emerge to take its place.
