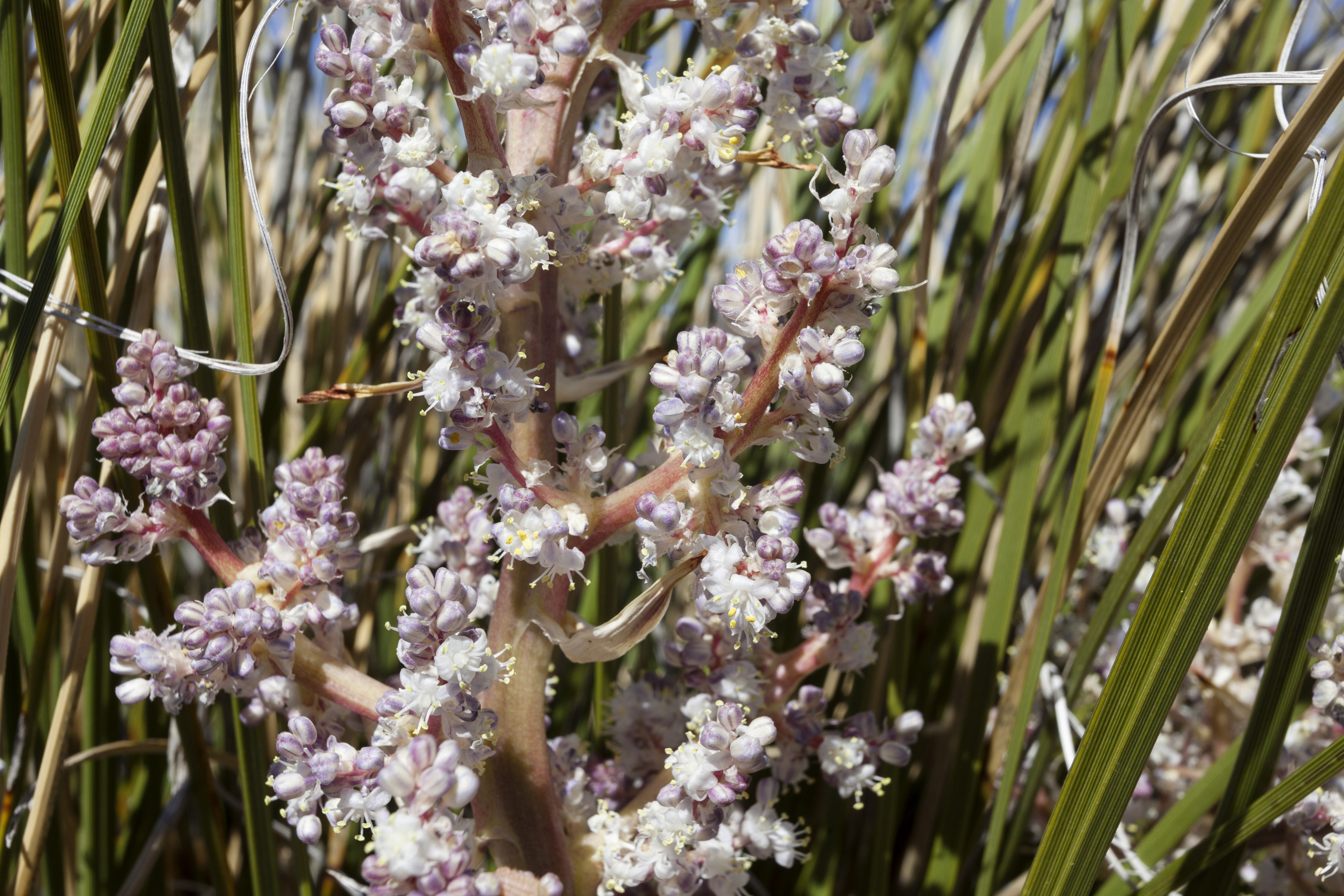
- Nolina texana, flowering

Scientific classification
- Kingdom: Plantae
- Clade: Embryophytes
- Clade: Tracheophytes
- Clade: Angiosperms
- Clade: Monocots
- Order: Asparagales
- Family: Asparagaceae
- Subfamily: Convallarioideae
- Genus: Nolina
- Species: N. texana

Binomial name
- Nolina texana S.Watson, 1879

Synonyms
- Beaucarnea texana (S.Watson) Baker; Nolina affinis Trel.; Nolina erumpens var. compacta Trel.; Nolina texana var. compacta (Trel.) I.M.Johnst.

= Nolina texana =

Species of flowering plant

Nolina texana, the Texas sacahuiste or Texas beargrass, is a plant in the asparagus family that resembles a large clump of grass. It grows in the south central United States and Northern Mexico. They are sometimes grown as a garden plant in xeriscape or native plant gardens.

== Description ==
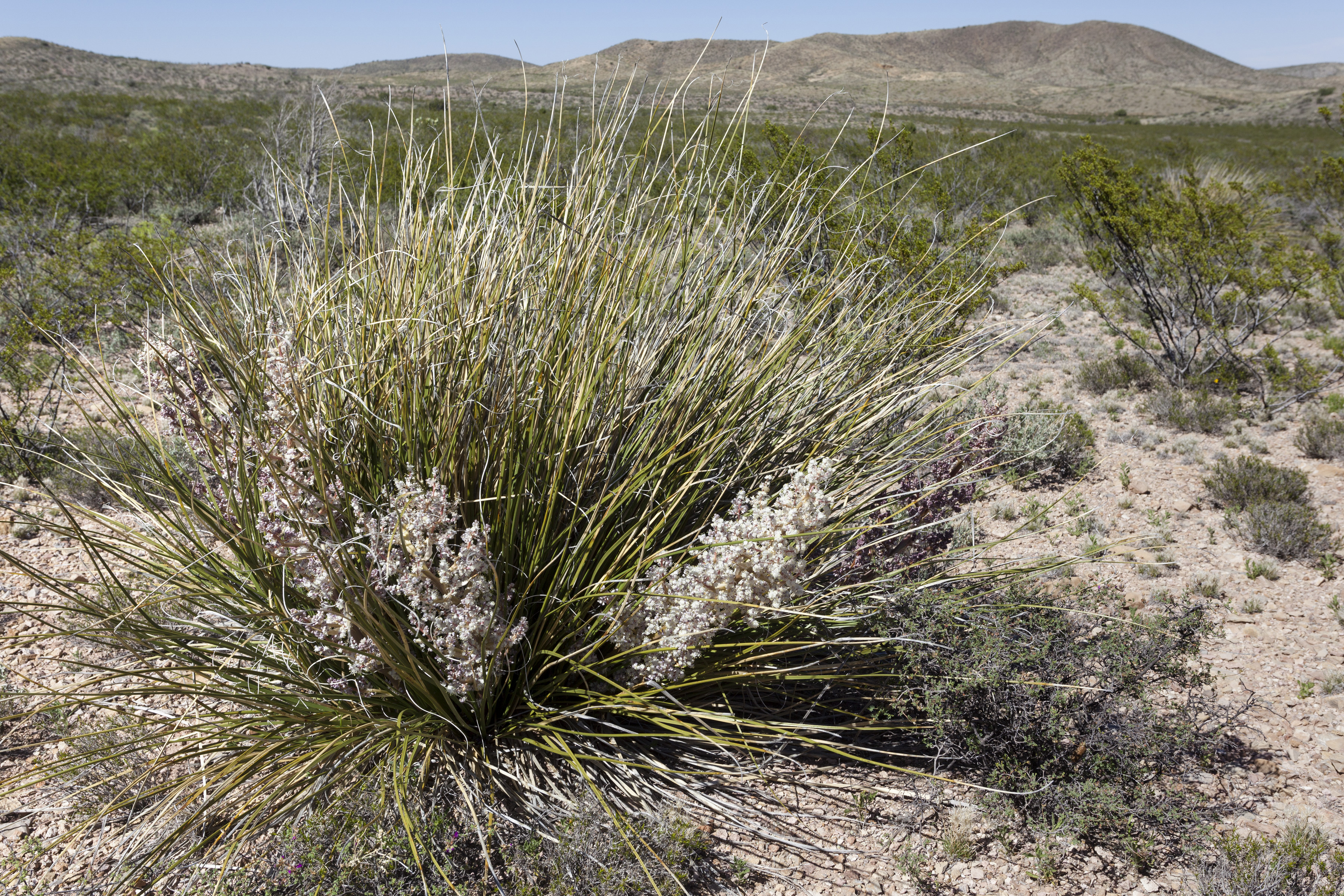
Nolina texana, Little Hatchet Mountains, New Mexico

Nolina texana plants strongly resemble clumps of grass with their large number of narrow leaves that sprout from the base of the plant (basal leaves) and the lack of a visible stem (acaulescent). Each tuft sprouts from the top of a woody structure at the top of the roots (a caudex) that may branch underground so each plant will have multiple rosettes.

The leaves of Nolina texana are stiff and wiry with a triangular cross section. The leaves sprouting from the base of the plant range in length from 40 to 90 centimeters (16 to 35 in) and 2–7 millimeters wide at the base, though usually less than 4 millimeters in width. The leaves almost universally have smooth edges and are not covered in wax (not glaucous), and on the rare occasions where the leaves have toothed edges it is limited to the ends of the leaves. The tips of the leaves die when the leaf is full grown

The flowering stem grows directly from the underground caudex (a scape) and will have a curve at the end. The few leaves attached to the flowering stem will curl towards their end. The floral part of the scape (the inflorescence) is repeatedly branched (paniculate) and densely packed with flowers and is very occasionally purple in color on Nolina texana. The inflorescence will be 25–70 centimeters tall and 5–17 centimeters wide. The thicker side branches on the inflorescence will outwards and then upwards (ascending). The smaller leaf like structures under each branch (the bracts) are 10–40 centimeters long and will persist on the flowing stem through its lifecycle.

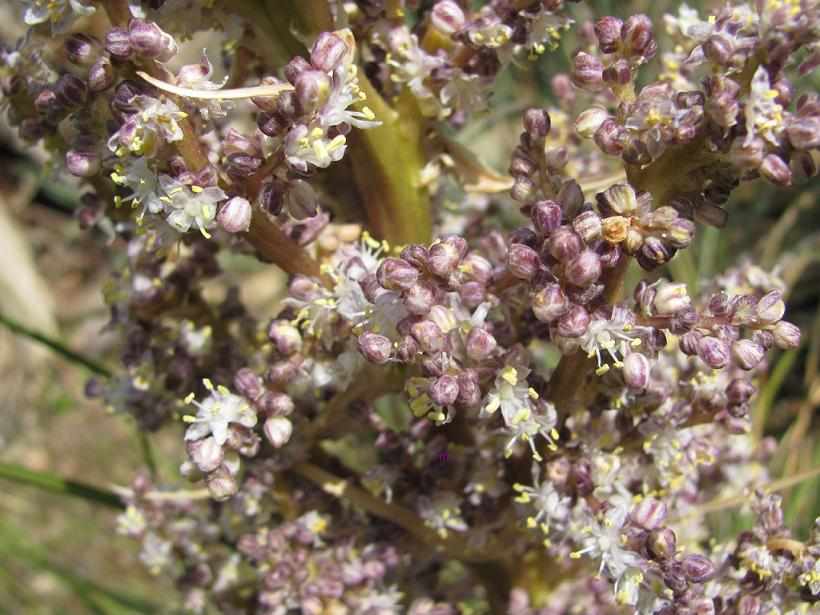
Nolina texana inflorescence detail

Nolina texana has flowers that do not clearly have petals or sepals, so the white, cream, greenish-white parts are called tepals. They are quite small, just 2.5–3.5 millimeters in length. The flowers have both fertile and infertile stamens, the fertile ones tend to be longer at 0.9–1.4 millimeters in length and the infertile ones 0.6–0.8 millimeters in length.

The fruit of Nolina texana is a thin walled capsule that is 3–4 millimeters by 4.5–8 millimeters. The capsules have three wings and will usually split irregularly. The rounded seeds are 2.6–3.4 millimeters in diameter.

=== Toxicity ===
Nolina texana is reported to cause sunburn (phototoxicity) by elevating blood phylloerythrin levels in association with liver problems. However, the chemical cause of the photosensitivity in the plant is unknown. Observational evidence suggests that only the buds and flowers are significantly toxic.

== Taxonomy ==
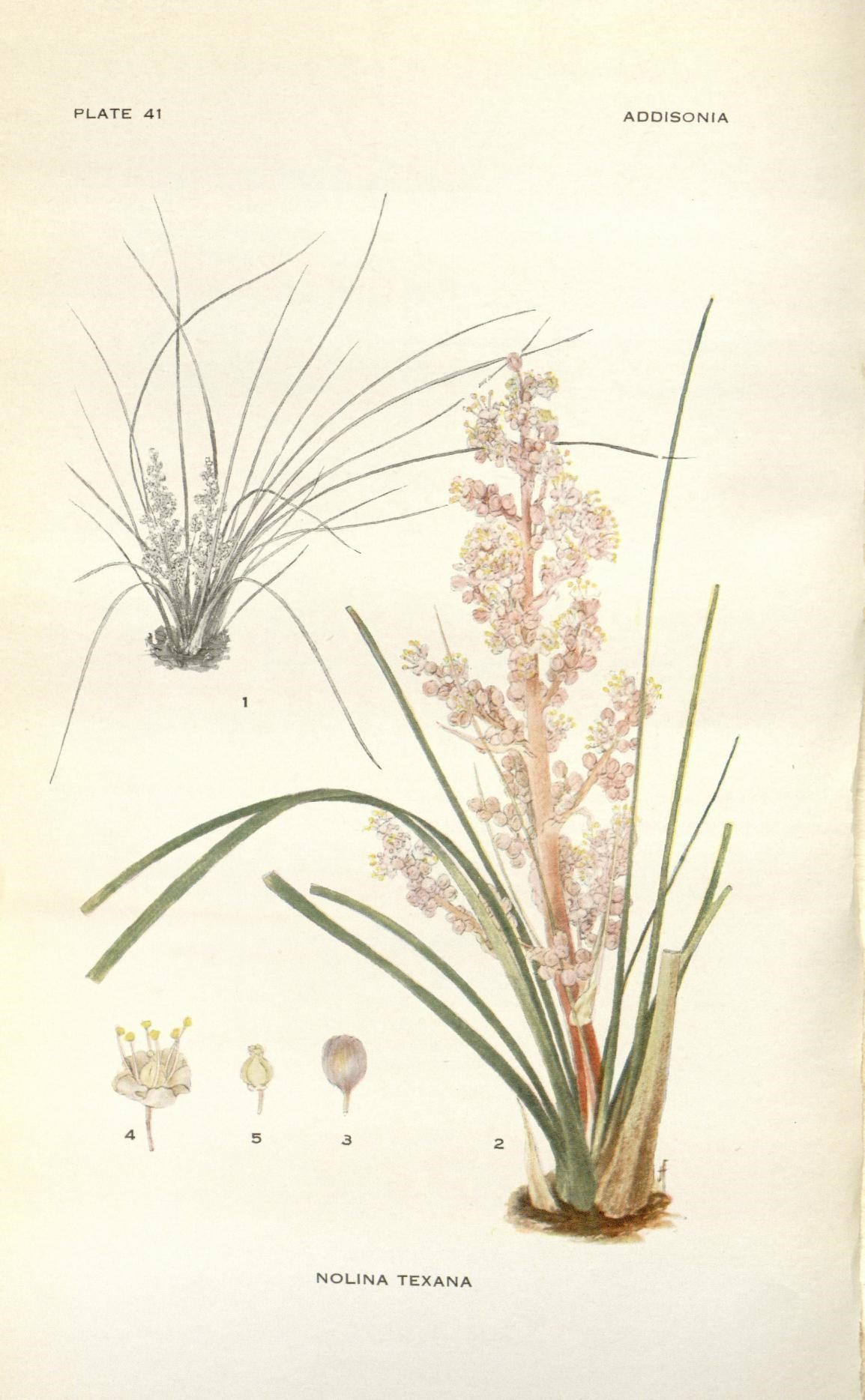
Nolina texana in Addisonia, 1917

Nolina texana was scientifically described and named in 1879 by Sereno Watson using specimens collected in Texas. Just one year later John Gilbert Baker proposed that it would be more properly placed in genus Beaucarnea along with a number of other species. This argument was not well accepted and it was only noted as a synonym even in 1893.

As of 2023 Nolina texana is listed as the correct species name by Plants of the World Online (POWO), World Flora Online, and World Plants with no valid subspecies.

=== Names ===
The genus name is a Latinized form of Abbé Pierre Charles Nolin, a French arboriculturist and director of the royal nurseries. The species name is from the state of Texas. Common names include "Texas sacahuiste", "bunchgrass", and "Texas beargrass".

== Range and habitat ==
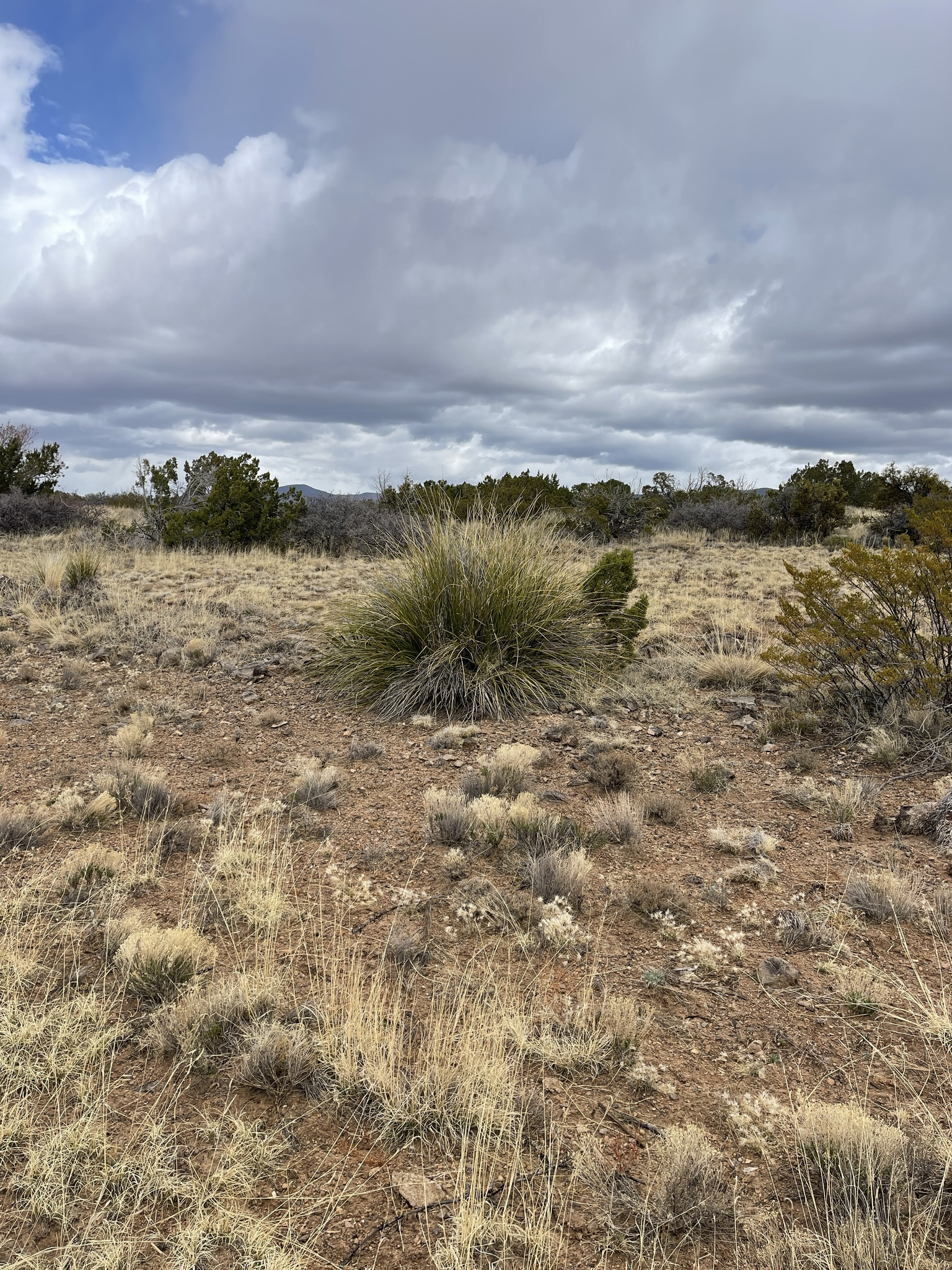
Nolina texana in Lincoln National Forest, New Mexico

There is some uncertainty about the range of Nolina texana. The very similar species Nolina greenei grows in Colorado, New Mexico, and Oklahoma and it is unknown how many observations of it in those states have been mistaken for Nolina texana. All sources agree that it is native to the US States of Texas and New Mexico. The USDA Natural Resources Conservation Service PLANTS database (PLANTS) additionally reports it in Arizona, Oklahoma, and Colorado. POWO disagrees with PLANTS about it growing Arizona while agreeing about its native status in Oklahoma and Colorado. With its wider coverage POWO also reports it as growing in Northern Mexico, with the Global Biodiversity Information Facility specifically reporting records of it in Sonora, Chihuahua, Coahuila, Durango, Zacatecas, and San Luis Potosí, with the most frequent records from the last of these.

The habitat for Nolina texana is in grassland, shrublands, and rocky hillsides on soils from limestone or granite. It can be found growing at altitudes from 200 to 2,000 meters (660 to 6,560 ft).

== Cultivation ==
Texas sacahuiste is the species from genus Nolina most often grown in gardens. It is valued by gardeners for its evergreen foliage and flowers. Plants will grow in full sun or partial shade and are reputed to be resistant to browsing by deer. For cultivation Texas sachuiste is often propagated by separating offsets.

It requires an alkaline soil and good drainage. It is reported as winter hardy in USDA zones 7–11, temperatures as low as −15 °F (−26 °C).
