= Amphicarpy =

Amphicarpy is a reproductive strategy that occurs with 13 plant families, expressed mostly in species with an annual life cycle. It is characterized by production of two types of fruit, for different ecological roles. It is sometimes restricted to the situation where one fruit type is aerial and the other subterranean (hypogeous), and similar to, but distinguished from, heterocarpy, which latter means a plant that carries two distinct types of fruit or seeds. The word amphicarp is the contraction of the Greek words ἀμφί meaning "of both kinds" and καρπός meaning fruit.

In a typical plant with amphicarpy, one fruit type is underground. These underground fruits usually develop from self-pollinating flowers. The fruits that develop from the aerial flowers may often be the result of cross-pollination.

Plants use this strategy to increase the chance that their genetic material is passed on. It can be referred to as bet hedging in which an organism produces several different phenotypes. Seeds from the underground flowers have low genetic variability (due to their selfing), tend to be larger, and may germinate from within the tissues of the flower, so ensuring that the annual can remain at the site that was suitable to it in the preceding year. Seeds from aerial flowers usually have greater genetic variability, tend to be smaller, and may be spread further. This assists the colonization of new territory, but also helps the exchange of genetic material between populations.

Worldwide, approximately 67 species exhibit amphicarpy, or 0.02% of the known species of flowering plants. Most of these 67 species occur in often disturbed or very stressful circumstances. 31 of the 67 species known to exhibit amphicarpy are in the family Fabaceae. In Israel, a country that harbors many disturbed habitats, with eight out of a total flora of twenty five hundred species, a much higher percentage of 0.32% is amphicarpic. Species that use amphicarpy include Catananche lutea, Gymnarrhena micrantha and Polygala lewtonii. Trifolium polymorphum is a perennial, that combines amphicarpy with vegetative reproduction through stolons. It grows in grasslands where its aerial flowers may not come into seed due to herbivores.
