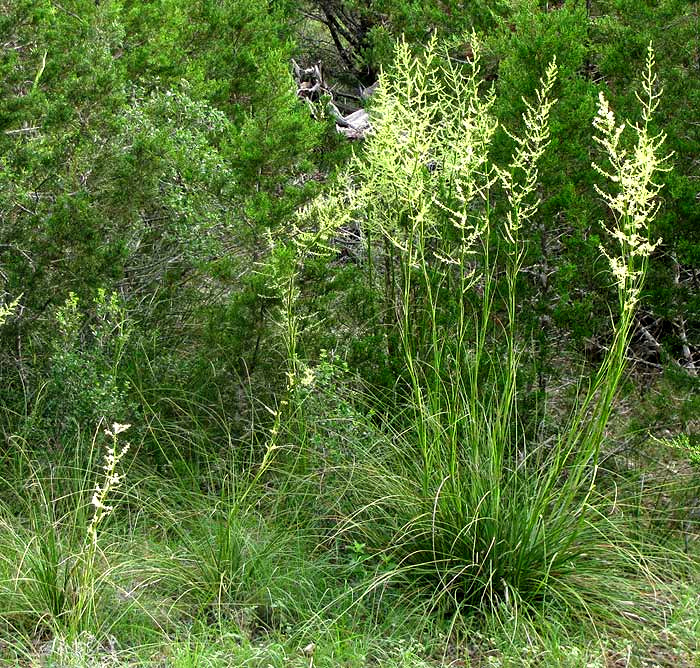
- Flowering in habitat

Scientific classification
- Kingdom: Plantae
- Clade: Embryophytes
- Clade: Tracheophytes
- Clade: Angiosperms
- Clade: Monocots
- Order: Asparagales
- Family: Asparagaceae
- Subfamily: Convallarioideae
- Genus: Nolina
- Species: N. lindheimeriana

Binomial name
- Nolina lindheimeriana (Scheele) S. Watson, 1879

Synonyms
- Beaucarnea lindheimeriana (Scheele) Baker (1872); Dasylirion lindheimerianum Scheele (1852); Dasylirion tenuifolium Torr. (1859)

= Nolina lindheimeriana =

Species of flowering plant

Nolina lindheimeriana, also known as devil's shoestring and beargrass, is a perennial species of plant in the asparagus family Asparagaceae.

== Description ==
Nolina lindheimeriana can be recognized by these feature:

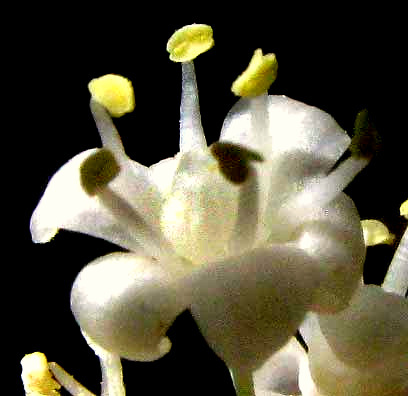
Nolina lindheimeriana functionally male flower

- The plant is stemless and usually produces several rosettes consisting of wiry, lax, grasslike, flattened leaves.
- Leaves, up to 1 meter long and 12mm wide (3 1/3 feet x ~1/2 inch), have margins bearing many small, close-together, skin-cutting teeth.
- Inflorescences are panicle type and up to 35cm long (~14 inches) atop scapes up to 70cm tall (~2 1/3 feet)
- Flowers are functionally male or female, the males with larger stamens, the females with better developed pistils, but both types have both stamens and pistils.
- Flowers have six yellow-green tepals up to 2.5mm long (~2 1/3 inch)
- Fruits are winged, slightly inflated capsules up to 10 mm tall and 11mm wide (~1/3 inch).

== Distribution ==
Nolina lindheimeriana is endemic just to the Edwards Plateau region of western central Texas in the USA.

The species has been reported in Zacatecas state, Mexico, well outside the distribution area usually designated, and various online sources report its presence there. Sources for the information in the citation just given do not mention its presence in Zacatecas. Searching for online herbarium collections of Nolina lindheimeriana on file at UNAM (MEXU), the National Autonomous University of Mexico, returns only collections from Texas.

== Habitat ==
Nolina lindheimeriana inhabits limestone hills with open woodlands and scrublands at elevations of 400-600 meters (~1300-2000 feet).

== Conservation status ==
Nolina lindheimeriana does not appear on lists of endangered or threatened species, but the Flora of North America remarks that the species is infrequently found and becoming more so as its habitat is destroyed through development and overgrazing.

== Human uses ==
=== In traditional societies ===
Fragments of Nolina species have been recovered from various archaeological sites, though their remains haven't been identified to species level. For example, basketry fragments from caves in western Texas, as well as Nolina remains from various other archaeological sites throughout the greater part of the dry Southwestern United States, have been found.

Nolina lindheimeriana contains rotenone, which in many societies has been used as fish poison when fishing for food, and as an insecticide.

However, it's been documented that Nolina microcara flowering stalks were cooked on open coals for half an hour, peeled and eaten by the Western Apache people. It's known that rotenone is degraded by high heat.

=== Gardening ===
Nolina lindheimeriana, like other species of Nolina, are favored for their extreme drought resistance, deer resistance, and their rosettes' attractive grassy texture; rosettes may clump into groups. The plants can be quite attractive when in flower or fruit, with the inflorescences rising about three meters tall (10 feet). However, because of the cutting leaf margins, plants shouldn't be placed near walkways. It is reported as cold tolerant, not needing much watering, and preferring locations in full or partial sunlight. It grows in various kinds of limestone-based loam soils, including caliche type. Also, true to its desert origins, the species can be a bit slow growing.

== Taxonomy ==
The type specimen for Nolina lindheimeriana was collected by Lindheimer on a rocky plateau northeast of "Neubraunfels," now New Braunfels, Texas, in June or July of 1846.

The genus name Nolina was chosen in honor of Abbé C. P. Nolin, a French arborist and director of the royal nurseries during the 1700s.

The species name lindheimeriana was chosen to honor Ferdinand Lindheimer, the "Father of Texas Botany."

== Gallery ==
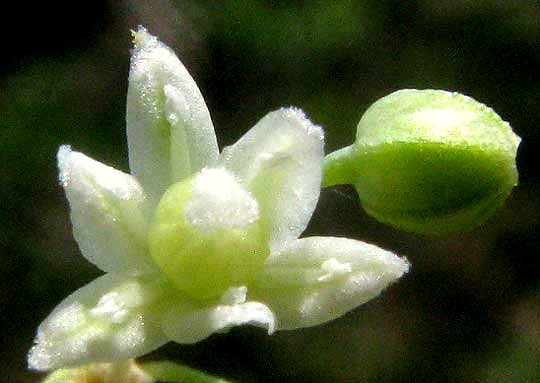
Nolina lindheimeriana functionally female flower

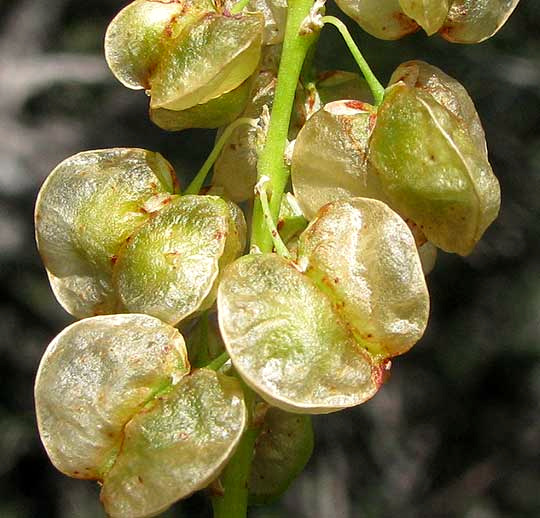
Nolina lindheimeriana 3-winged capsular fruits

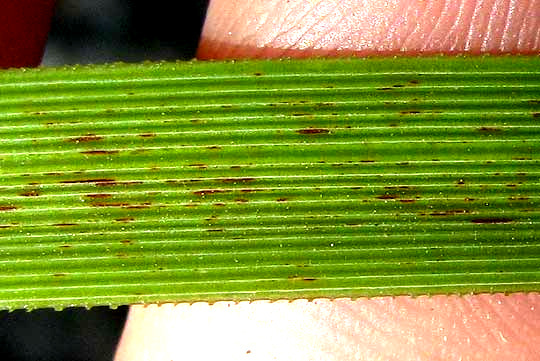
Nolina lindheimeriana blade with finely toothed margins

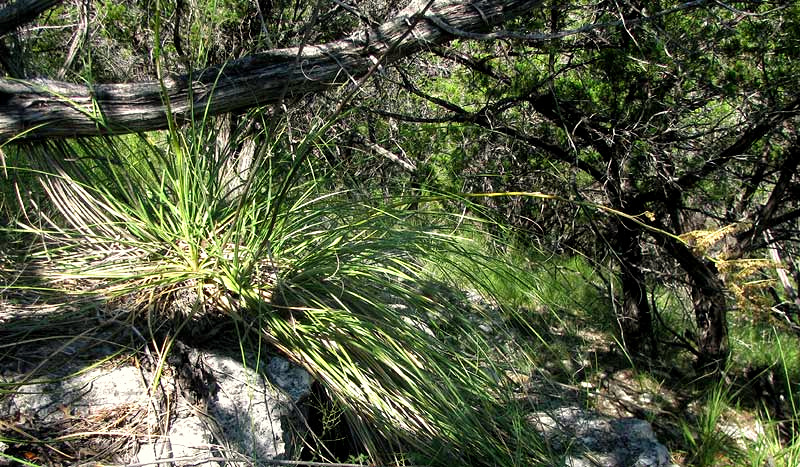
Nolina lindheimeriana in habitat on limestone ledge
