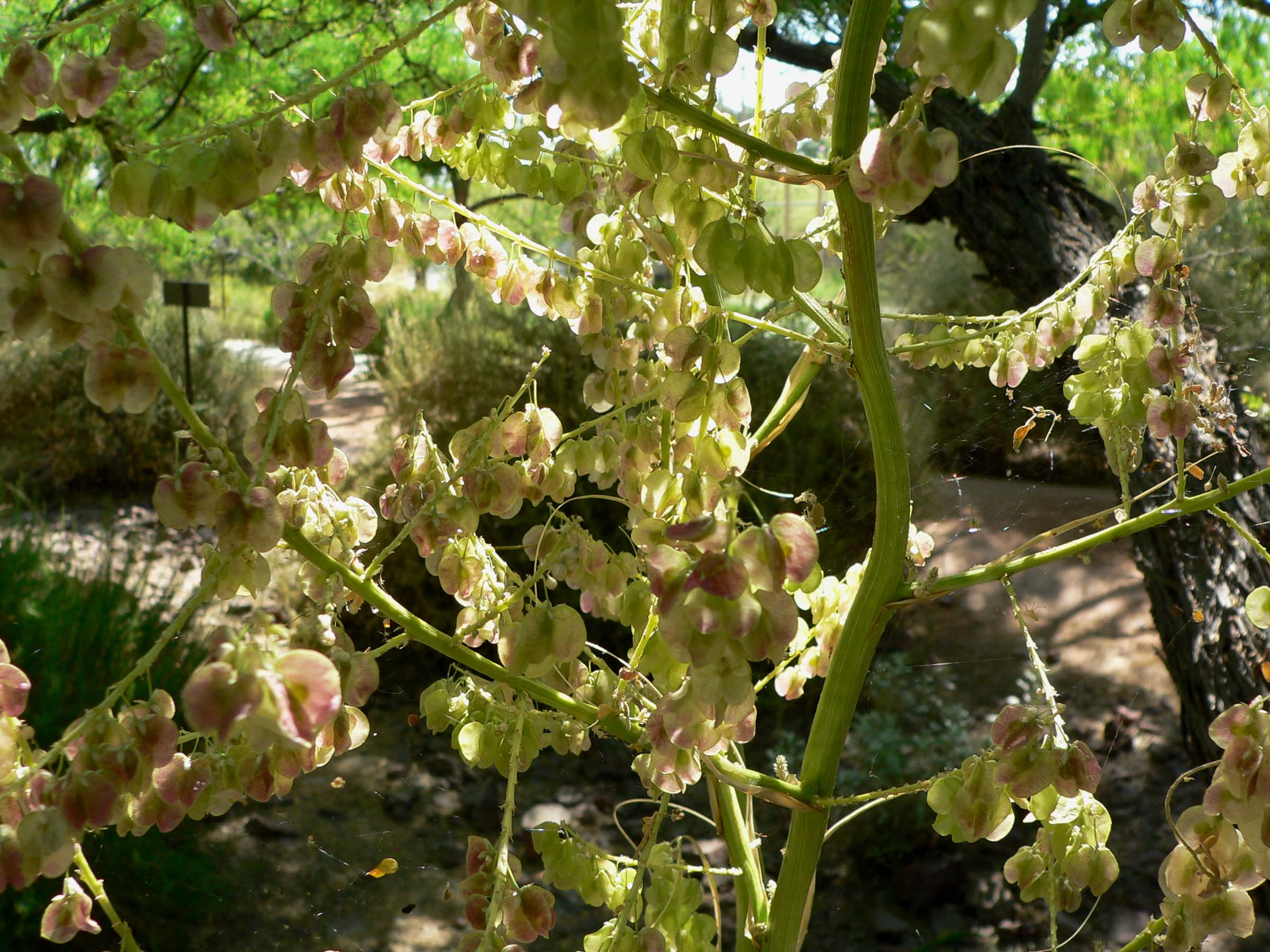

Conservation status
- Apparently Secure (NatureServe)

Scientific classification
- Kingdom: Plantae
- Clade: Tracheophytes
- Clade: Angiosperms
- Clade: Monocots
- Order: Asparagales
- Family: Asparagaceae
- Subfamily: Convallarioideae
- Genus: Nolina
- Species: N. microcarpa

Binomial name
- Nolina microcarpa S.Watson

Synonyms
- Nolina caudata

= Nolina microcarpa =

Species of flowering plant

Nolina microcarpa is a species of flowering plant in the asparagus family known by the common names sacahuista and palmilla. Like other species of Nolina, it may be called beargrass. It is native to northern Mexico and the southwestern United States in Arizona and New Mexico. It does occur in the southwestern corner of Utah, where it has a limited distribution on Navajo Sandstone, but reports of it occurring in Texas may be in error.

Sacahuista is variable in appearance. In general it is a large plant that grows in clumps up to two meters wide. It produces a rosette of many narrow leaves each up to 130 centimetres (4.3 feet) long but only 1.2 centimetres (0.47 inches) wide. The grasslike leaf blades are thick, rough, and serrated. There is no aboveground stem; the leaves grow from a woody underground caudex. When the plant flowers it produces a scape up to 1.5 to 1.8 m (4.9 to 5.9 ft) tall. The inflorescence is a panicle of flowers with tiny white tepals. The species is dioecious, with male and female flowers on separate plants; occasionally there are flowers with both male and female parts functional. The fruit is a papery, three-sided capsule about half a centimeter long and wide.

This plant grows in dry habitat types, such as desert grasslands, pinyon-juniper woodlands, and chaparral. It is a dominant plant species in a number of ecosystems. It may grow alongside oaks, pines, and manzanitas. The region experiences a bimodal pattern of precipitation, with rainy seasons occurring in November through April and again during the summer. Wildfire is not uncommon. The plant resprouts from its caudex after its aboveground parts burn. Sacahuista herbage is flammable, increasing the local intensity of fires when it ignites.

Sacahuista provides food for animals such as white-tailed deer. However, it is poisonous to sheep and goats, and less so to cattle. Sheep fed parts of the plant have been noted to experience impaction of the rumen and liver toxicity. In an experimental setting the plant also appears to be toxic to rats and chukar partridges, resulting in symptoms such as loss of coordination and diarrhea when the seeds were ingested. Humans can eat the plant. Native American groups have eaten the fruit, used the stalks as a vegetable, and ground the seeds into flour for bread. The plant has also been used for thatching, mats, basketry, brushes, rope, and cooking tools. Today it is used for landscaping in appropriate climates.
