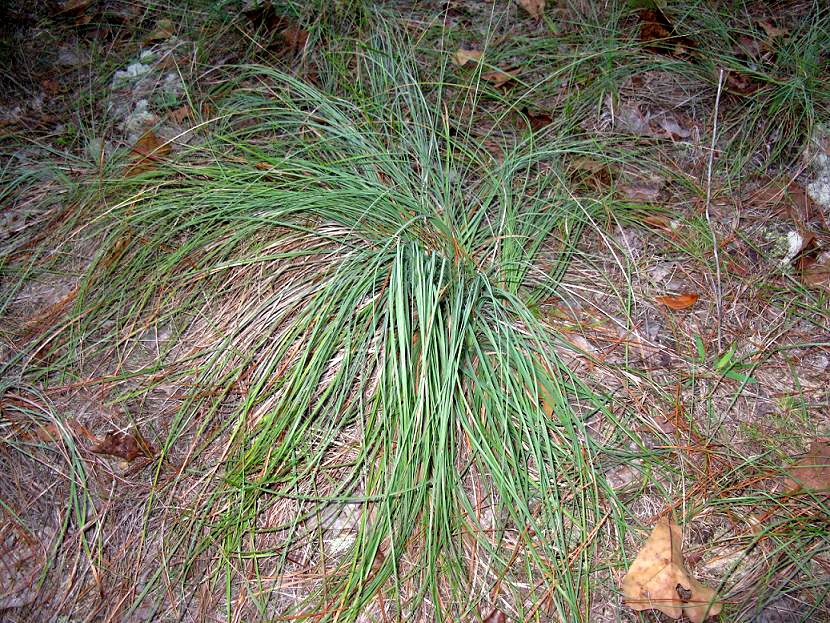
- Nolina georgiana in Georgia

Scientific classification
- Kingdom: Plantae
- Clade: Tracheophytes
- Clade: Angiosperms
- Clade: Monocots
- Order: Asparagales
- Family: Asparagaceae
- Subfamily: Convallarioideae
- Genus: Nolina; Michx.

Synonyms
- Roulinia Brongn.

= Nolina =

Beargrass

Genus of flowering plants

Nolina is a genus of temperate and tropical xerophytic flowering plants belonging to the family Asparagaceae. The native distribution of the genus includes most of Mexico and the southern regions of the United States north to Nevada and Colorado. Especially in the USA, members of the genus are known as beargrass, some of which are cultivated as ornamental plants.

Nolina species grow large rosettes of many leaves, with many species forming large, erect trunks, with some species branching to contain multiple rosettes of leaves, while others are stemless. They are typically large plants, and are dioecious, with male and female flowers being produced on different plants.

The genus was named by André Michaux after the 18th century French arboriculturist Abbé C. P. Nolin. The type species is Nolina georgiana, the only species included by Michaux in the new genus he described; this is one of the stemless species, without any trunk.

== Classification ==
In the APG III classification system of plant taxonomy, Nolina is a member of the family Asparagaceae, and within this family, Nolina is part of a subfamily, the Convallarioideae. In the past, many members of the Convallarioideae, including Nolina, were placed in the now defunct family Ruscaceae). Former alternative placements include Nolinaceae and Agavaceae.

Previously, some botanists have included the genus Beaucarnea in Nolina, and over time, multiple species of both genera have been moved back and forth between the two genera. More recent molecular phylogenetic research found that Beaucarnea and Nolina are well supported by DNA and morphological evidence as being two distinct genera.

== Description ==
Nolina are perennial plants, with some growing as tufts of leaves arising from near ground level with little or only a short above ground stem, whilst others grow in a tree-like manner forming a woody, leafless caudex or trunk of up to about 2-7m, that with age, may branch to form multiple branches. The shorter species, especially those not forming an above ground stem, usually form colonies, often with many rosettes. The leaves are arranged into rosettes of many long, linear leaves, with the leaves being broader where they meet the stem.

The inflorescence consists of a scape (or a bare stem arising from the leaf rosettes) of between 5-250cm length, with panicles of flowers, of 30 to 180cm in length, held along the scape. Each node holds 2-5 functionally unisexual flowers. The tepals are white, cream or light tan. The fruits are capsular, 3-locular, 3-lobed and often inflated.

== Species ==
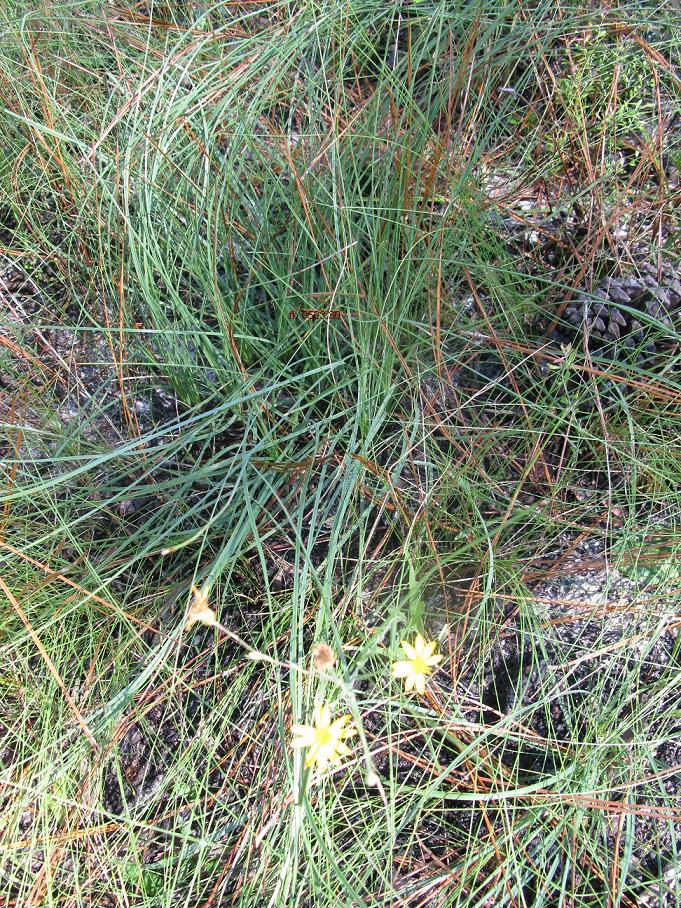
Nolina atopocarpa in Apalachicola, Florida

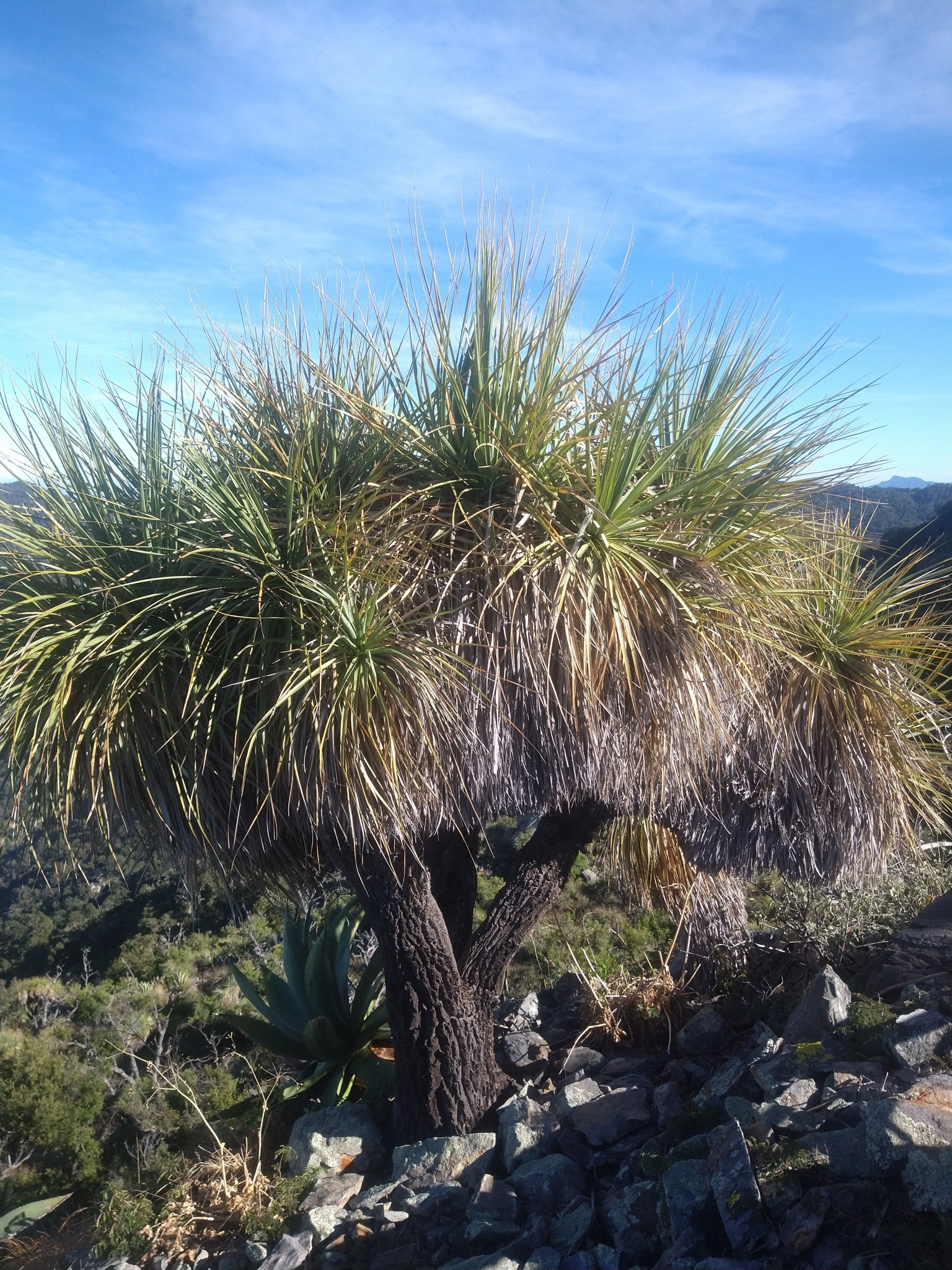
Nolina beldingii in Baja California Sur, Mexico

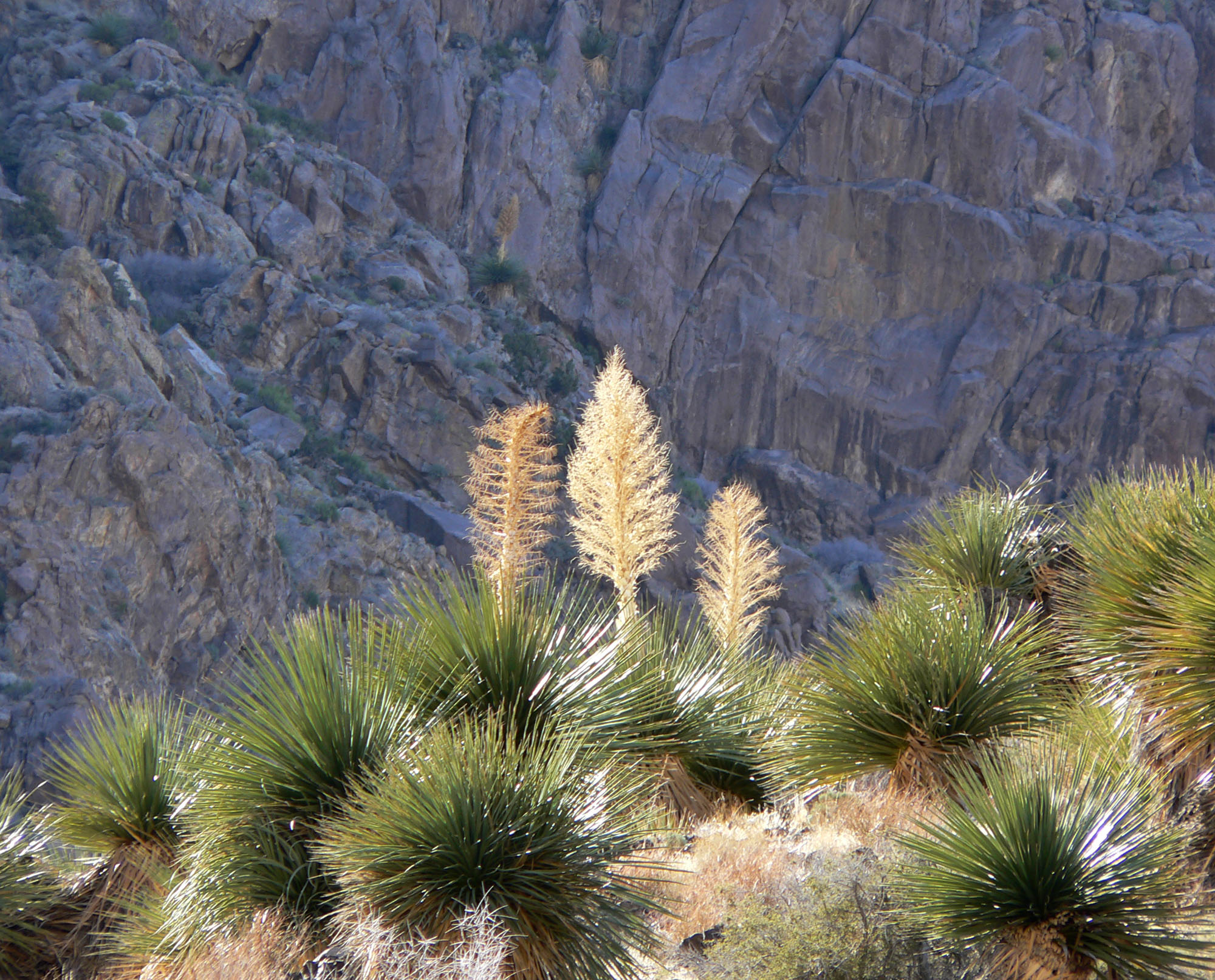
Nolina parryi in the Mojave Desert in San Bernardino County, California

As of November 2024, World Flora Online (WFO) lists the genus Nolina to contain 30 accepted species, with Plants of the World Online (POWO) accepting 35 accepted species.

As of November 2024, the 35 accepted species of Nolina accepted by Kew/POWO are as follows:

- Nolina arenicola Correll – Trans-Pecos beargrass - western Texas
- Nolina atopocarpa Bartlett – Florida beargrass - Florida`
- Nolina azureogladiata D.Donati - Oaxaca
- Nolina beldingii Brandegee - Baja California Sur
- Nolina bigelovii (Torr.) S.Watson – Bigelow's nolina - Sonora, Arizona, southern Nevada, southern California
- Nolina brandegeei (Trel.) L.Hern. - Mexico (Baja California)
- Nolina brittoniana Nash – Britton's beargrass - Florida
- Nolina caxcana Ruiz-Sanchez, P.Carrillo & L.Hern. - Mexico (Zacatecas, Jalisco)
- Nolina cespitifera Trel. - Coahuila, Zacatecas, Nuevo León
- Nolina cismontana Dice – Peninsular beargrass - southern California
- Nolina durangensis Trel. - Chihuahua, Durango
- Nolina erumpens (Torr.) S.Watson – Foothill beargrass - Chihuahua, western Texas
- Nolina excelsa García-Mend. & E.Solano - Oaxaca
- Nolina georgiana Michx. – Georgia beargrass - Georgia, South Carolina
- Nolina greenei S.Watson ex Trel. – Woodland beargrass - New Mexico, southern Colorado, northwestern Texas, panhandle of Oklahoma
- Nolina hibernica Hochstaetter & D.Donati - Tamaulipas, Nuevo León
- Nolina humilis S.Watson – Guanajuato, San Luis Potosí
- Nolina interrata Gentry – Dehesa beargrass - San Diego County, northern Baja California
- Nolina juncea (Zucc.) J.F.Macbr. - northern Mexico
- Nolina lindheimeriana (Scheele) S.Watson – Devil's shoestring, Lindheimer nolina - central Texas
- Nolina matapensis Wiggins - Sonora, Chihuahua
- Nolina micrantha I.M.Johnst. – Chaparral beargrass - Coahuila, Chihuahua, western Texas, southern New Mexico
- Nolina microcarpa S.Watson – Palmilla Sacahuista - Chihuahua, Sonora, Arizona, New Mexico, southwestern Utah
- Nolina nelsonii Rose - Tamaulipas
- Nolina orbicularis L.Hern. - Mexico (Guanajuato to San Luis Potosi)
- Nolina palmeri S.Watson - Baja California
- Nolina parryi S.Watson – Parry's beargrass - Arizona, southern California, Baja California, Sonora
- Nolina parviflora (Kunth) Hemsl. - central and southern Mexico
- Nolina pollyjeanneae Hochstätter - USA (Oklahoma)
- Nolina pumila Rose - northern and central Mexico
- Nolina rigida Trel. - Mexico; apparently extinct
- Nolina robusta L.Hern. - Mexico (Querétaro to San Luis Potosí)
- Nolina rodriguezii Ruiz-Sanchez, P.Carrillo & L.Hern. - Mexico (Jalisco)
- Nolina texana S.Watson – Texas sacahuista - Texas, New Mexico, Oklahoma, Chihuahua, Coahuila
- Nolina watsonii (Baker) Hemsl. - Mexico (Tamaulipas, Guanajuato, San Luis Potosí)

As of November 2024, the five species accepted by POWO but not currently accepted by WFO are:

- Nolina brandegeei (homotypic synonym: Nolina palmeri var. brandegeei Trel. in Proc. Amer. Philos. Soc. 50: 420 (1911))
- Nolina caxcana Ruiz-Sanchez, P.Carrillo & L.Hern.
- Nolina orbicularis L.Hern. - Mexico (Guanajuato to San Luis Potosi)
- Nolina robusta L.Hern. - Mexico (Querétaro to San Luis Potosí)
- Nolina rodriguezii Ruiz-Sanchez, P.Carrillo & L.Hern. - Mexico (Jalisco)

=== Formerly placed here ===
- Beaucarnea gracilis Lem. (as N. gracilis (Lem.) Cif. & Giacom.)
- Beaucarnea guatemalensis Rose (as N. guatemalensis (Rose) Cif. & Giacom.)
- Beaucarnea recurvata Lem. (as N. recurvata (Lem.) Hemsl.)
