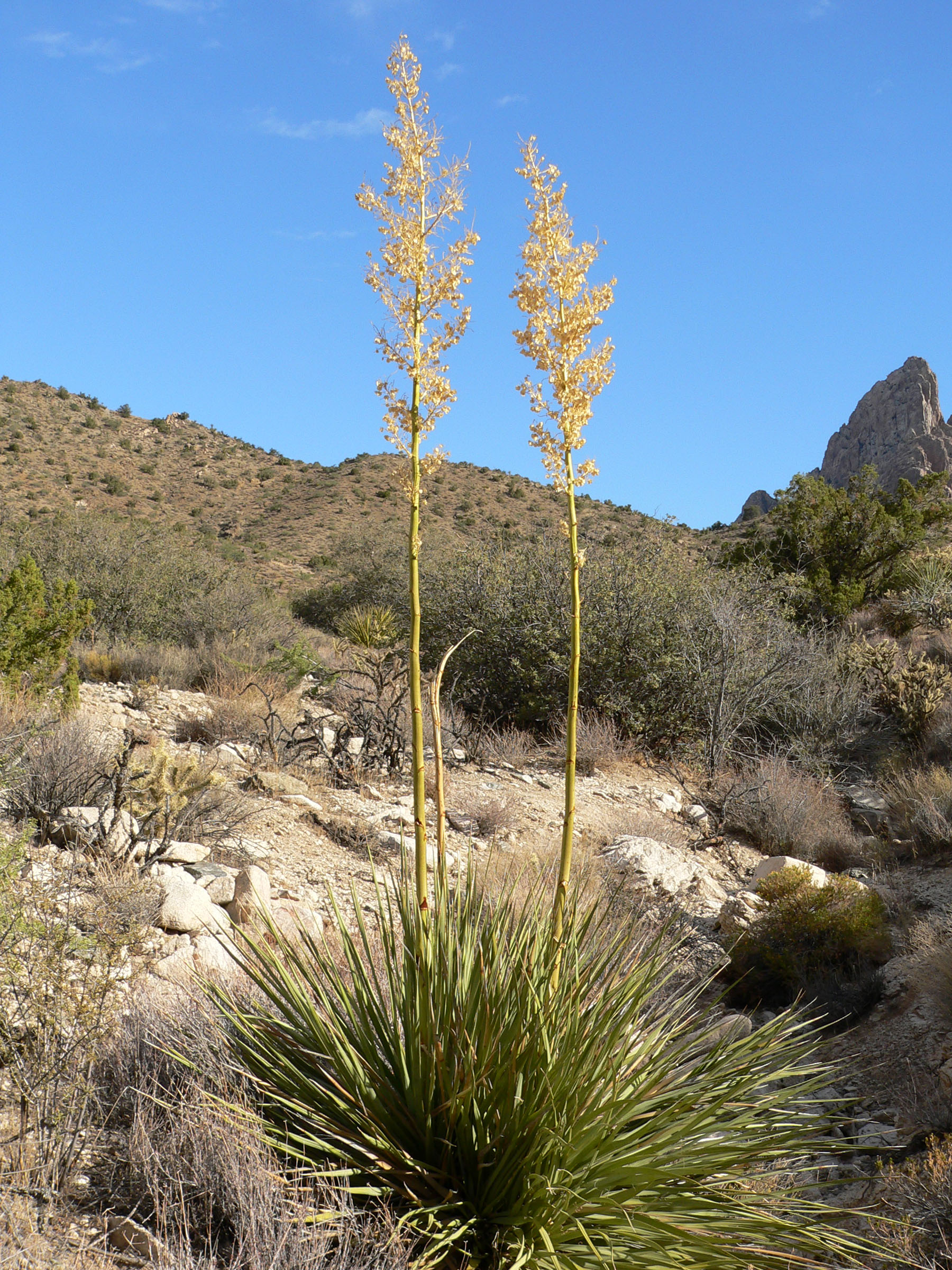

Scientific classification
- Kingdom: Plantae
- Clade: Tracheophytes
- Clade: Angiosperms
- Clade: Monocots
- Order: Asparagales
- Family: Asparagaceae
- Subfamily: Convallarioideae
- Genus: Nolina
- Species: N. bigelovii

Binomial name
- Nolina bigelovii (Torr.) S.Watson
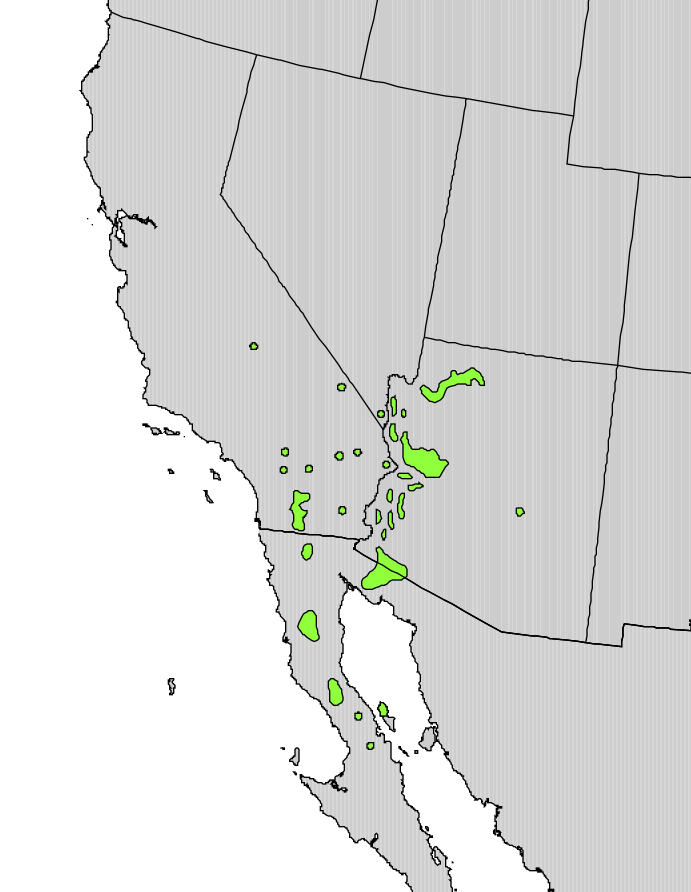
- Natural range

= Nolina bigelovii =

Species of flowering plant

Nolina bigelovii (Bigelow's nolina or beargrass) is a flowering plant native to the Southwestern United States, California, and northwest Mexico. It grows in the driest desert areas and at elevations up to 1,500 m (4,900 ft) .

== Distribution ==
In Arizona, Nevada, and southern California, Nolina bigelovii is especially prevalent along the Lower Colorado River Valley, especially in the western Arizona Sonoran Desert, but also regions of the mountains of southern California's Colorado Desert. The species ranges in the Peninsular Ranges of Baja California-(the north state), as well as Isla Ángel de la Guarda in the northern Gulf of California. Its northeast range extent is in the Grand Canyon of Arizona.

== Description ==
Nolina bigelovii is not a grass. The trunklike stem may exceed 2 m (6.6 ft) in length, part of which may be underground. The semi-stiff, shreddy leaves are arranged in rosettes, with up to 150 per rosette. The bases are thick and fleshy and much wider than the rest of the blade.

The inflorescence may approach 4 m (13 ft) in height. The small flowers each have six whitish tepals a few millimeters in length.
