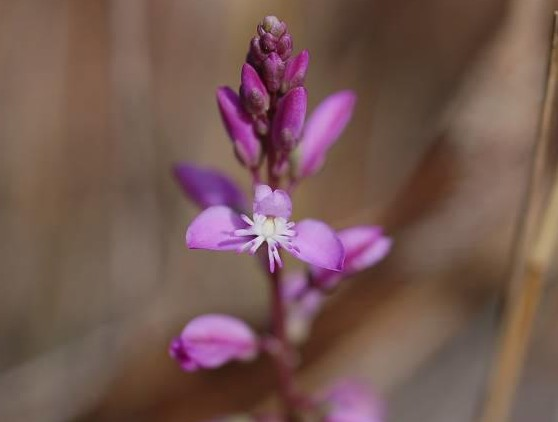

Conservation status
- Imperiled (NatureServe)

Scientific classification
- Kingdom: Plantae
- Clade: Embryophytes
- Clade: Tracheophytes
- Clade: Spermatophytes
- Clade: Angiosperms
- Clade: Eudicots
- Clade: Rosids
- Order: Fabales
- Family: Polygalaceae
- Genus: Senega
- Species: S. lewtonii

Binomial name
- Senega lewtonii (Small) J.F.B.Pastore & J.R.Abbott

Synonyms
- Polygala lewtonii Small

= Senega lewtonii =

Species of flowering plant

Senega lewtonii is a rare species of flowering plant in the milkwort family known by the common name Lewton's polygala, or Lewton's milkwort. It is endemic to Florida in the United States, where it is limited to the central ridge of the peninsula. There are about 49 occurrences of the plant remaining. Most occurrences contain very few plants. The species is threatened by the loss and degradation of its habitat. This is a federally listed endangered species of the United States.

== Description ==
The plant is a short-lived perennial herb producing erect, fleshy stems from the top of its taproot. The stems grow up to 20 centimeters tall. The leaves are alternately arranged and overlapping, with a number of small leaves in the axil of one larger leaf. They are linear to spatula-shaped and about a centimeter long. The top of each stem is occupied by a short inflorescence of flowers.

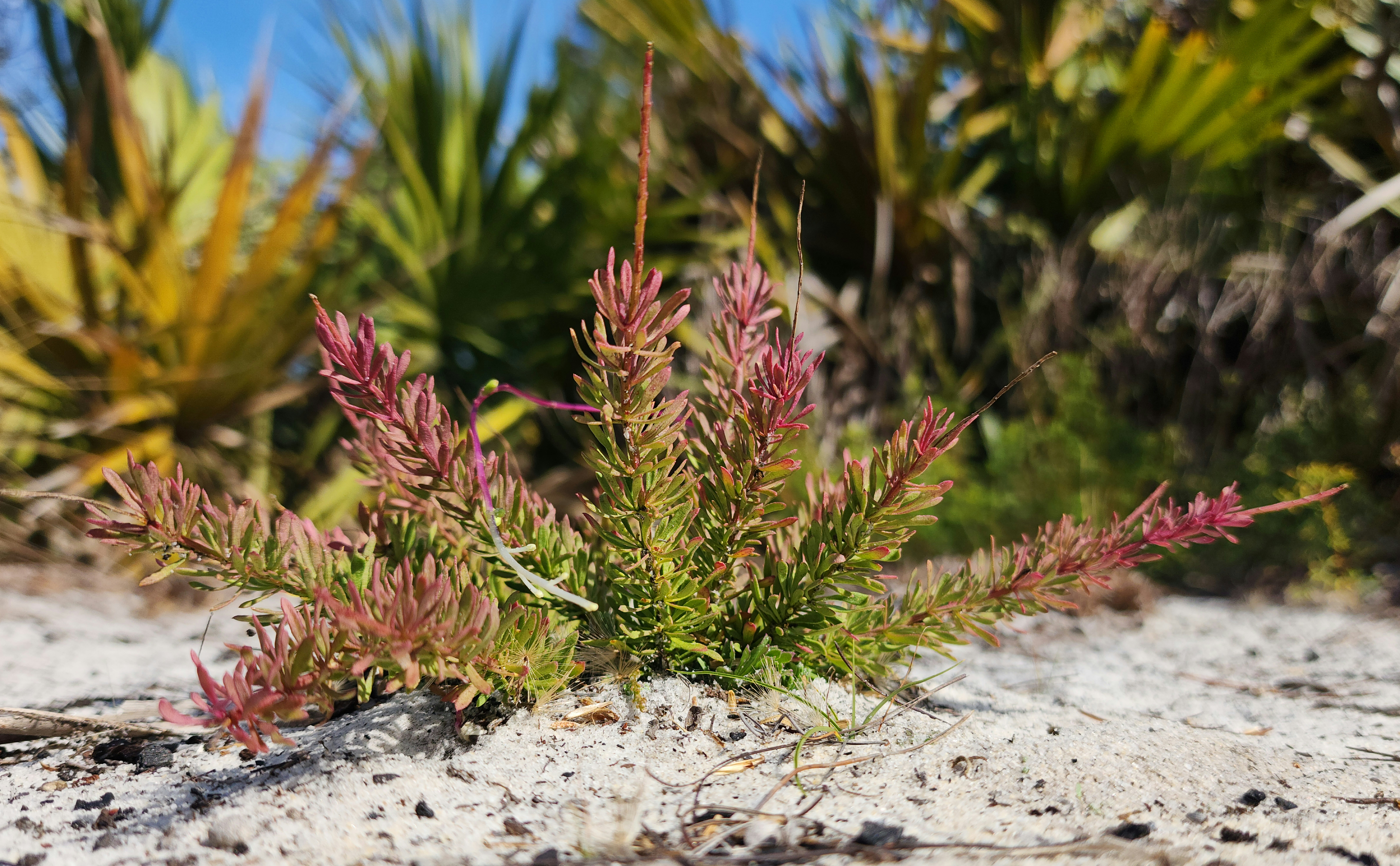
Typically subterranean cleistogamous flowers visible

There are three types of flowers on this plant. The most obvious is the chasmogamous type borne in the inflorescence on the stem. These are each half a centimeter long with pink winglike sepals and three smaller tufted pink petals at the center. The second type of flower is cleistogamous and borne at the base of the plant. These do not open, but self-pollinate. These flowers, which occur at the leaf axils, are rare. The third type of flower is a cleistogamous, unopening type that remains underground. These are borne on a stalk up to 40 centimeters long which is located just below the surface of the soil. They are white in color, and also self-pollinate. The very uncommon mode of reproduction characterized by aboveground chasmogamous flowers and belowground cleistogamous flowers is called amphicarpy and it is known from fewer than 100 plant species. The different types of flowers may occur at different times of the year. The aboveground flowers depend on insect pollinators for successful reproduction, as evidenced by the low fruit production of flowers in a pollinator-exclusion experiment. Pollinators include bee-flies, flower flies, and leaf-cutter bees. The fruit is a capsule containing cylindrical seeds each about 0.3 centimeters long. The seeds have hairs which attract ants, which then collect and disperse them. The most common type of seed-collecting ant is Pheidole morrissii and others include Paratrichina arenavaga and P. phantasma.

== Distribution ==
This species grows on the sandhills of Central Florida and the transition between sandhill and Florida scrub. The land is dominated by longleaf pine, turkey oak, and other oaks. It can also be found in recently cleared areas such as the dry, open clearings around power lines. The substrate is yellow sand. Other endangered plant species in the habitat include Warea amplexifolia, Pseudoziziphus celata, Prunus geniculata, and Nolina brittoniana.

== Habitat ==
The habitat occupied by this species is maintained by a natural fire regime. Fire helps the plant by removing competing plants and the buildup of ground litter and lichens. Though the plant is burned in fires, its seedlings sprout in large numbers in the seasons after a large fire, in one case increasing the population by 800%. It is thought that smoke may trigger or foster germination of seeds in the soil seed bank. Fire also benefits the plant by increasing its survival, lowering its age of reproductive maturity, and increasing the density of the plants.

Because fire is beneficial and necessary for the plant, the common practice of fire suppression is a major threat to its survival. The plant declines the longer its habitat goes without a fire. Another major threat to the species is the outright loss of its habitat to development. The yellow-sand sandhill regions are desirable for conversion to citrus groves. Land has also been consumed in rapidly expanding development of residential areas. The destruction of the habitat has resulted in habitat fragmentation. Remaining fragments are popular terrain for off-road vehicle enthusiasts.

Many occurrences of the species are located on land that is now protected. Prescribed burns help to bring the habitat back to its normal state.
