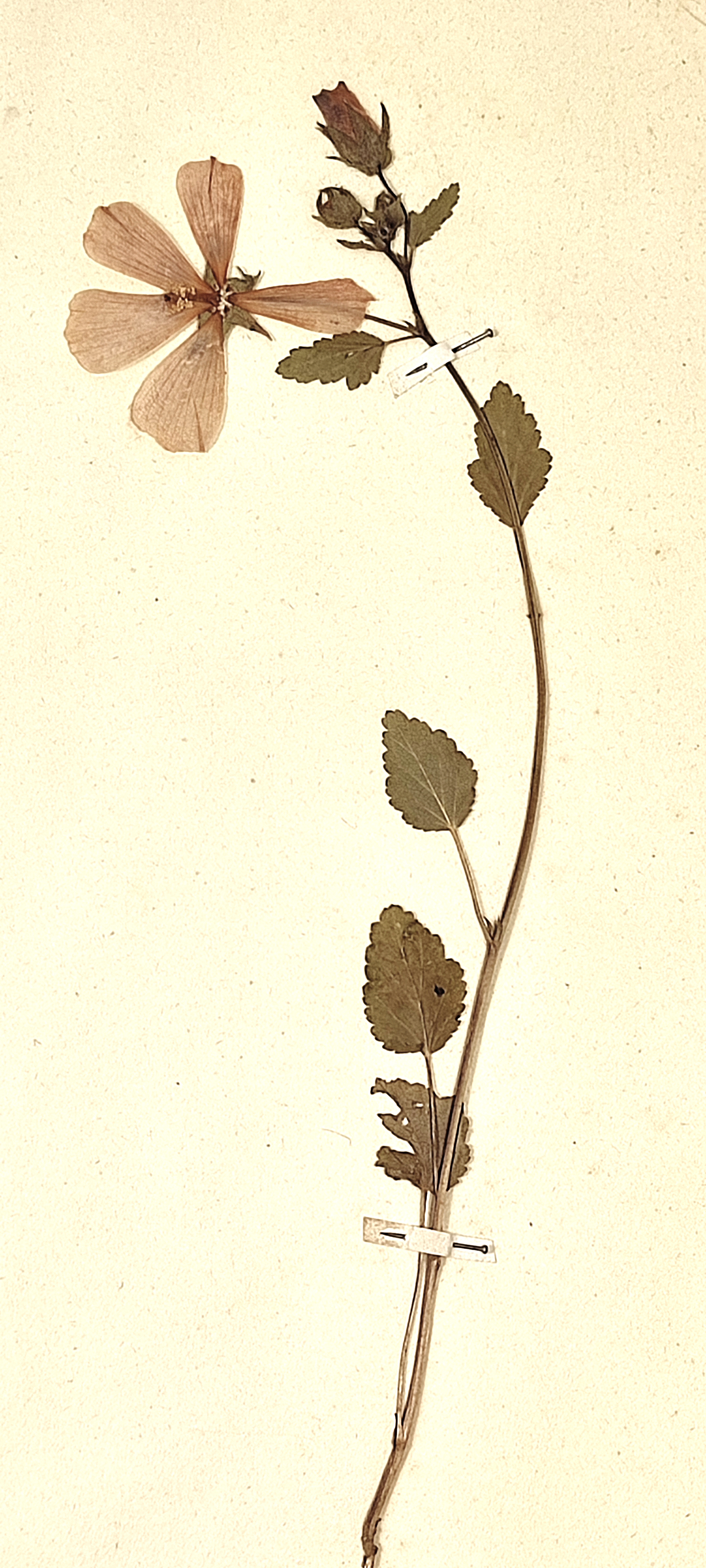
- Malope malacoides

Scientific classification
- Kingdom: Plantae
- Clade: Tracheophytes
- Clade: Angiosperms
- Clade: Eudicots
- Clade: Rosids
- Order: Malvales
- Family: Malvaceae
- Genus: Malope
- Species: M. malacoides

Binomial name
- Malope malacoides L.

= Malope malacoides =

Species of plant

Malope malacoides is a species of plants in the family Malvaceae.

== Sources ==
This article incorporates text from a free content work. Licensed under CC0 (license statement/permission). Text taken from Malope malacoides. Encyclopedia of Life.
