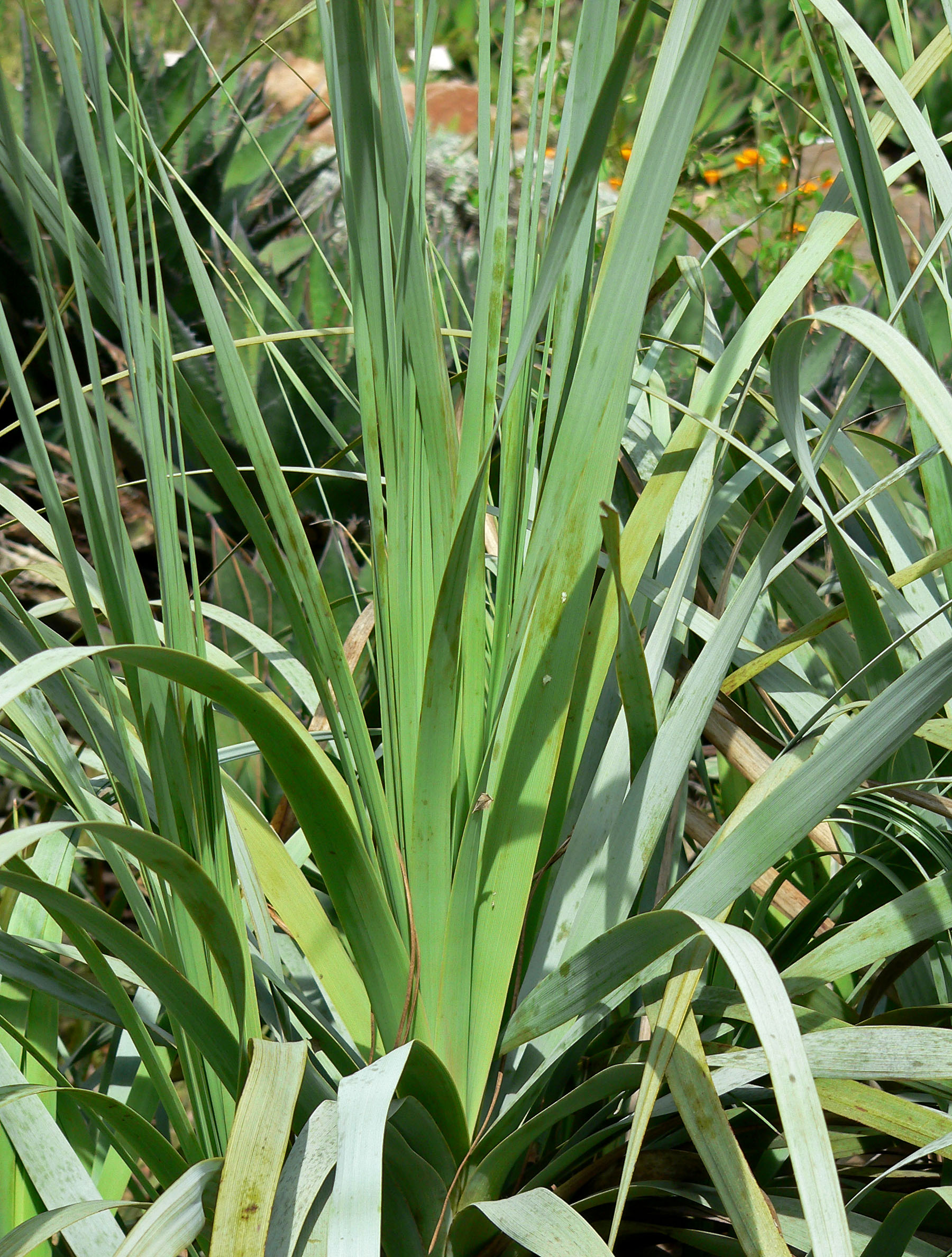

Conservation status
- Imperiled (NatureServe)
- CITES Appendix II

Scientific classification
- Kingdom: Plantae
- Clade: Embryophytes
- Clade: Tracheophytes
- Clade: Angiosperms
- Clade: Monocots
- Order: Asparagales
- Family: Asparagaceae
- Subfamily: Convallarioideae
- Genus: Nolina
- Species: N. interrata

Binomial name
- Nolina interrata Gentry

= Nolina interrata =

Species of flowering plant

Nolina interrata is a rare species of flowering plant known by the common names Dehesa nolina and Dehesa beargrass. It is known from about ten occurrences in central San Diego County, California, and fewer than 100 individual plants on land across the border in Baja California. The plant was first described in 1946 when found at the type locality near El Cajon, California, and all the individuals known in California are located within a six-square-mile area there. Although rare, numbering about 9,000 plants total in existence, the species is relatively well protected in its habitat and a proposal for federal protected status was withdrawn.

This plant produces a branching stem, part of which grows underground, lined with rosettes of stiff, waxy, blue-green leaves, up to 45 per rosette. The leaves are thick and somewhat fleshy at the bases, and shreddy and serrated along the edges. The erect inflorescence may be up to 1.6 meters tall, bearing branches lined with tiny flowers each with six whitish tepals a few millimeters long. The fruit is a papery capsule containing reddish brown seeds about half a centimeter wide.
