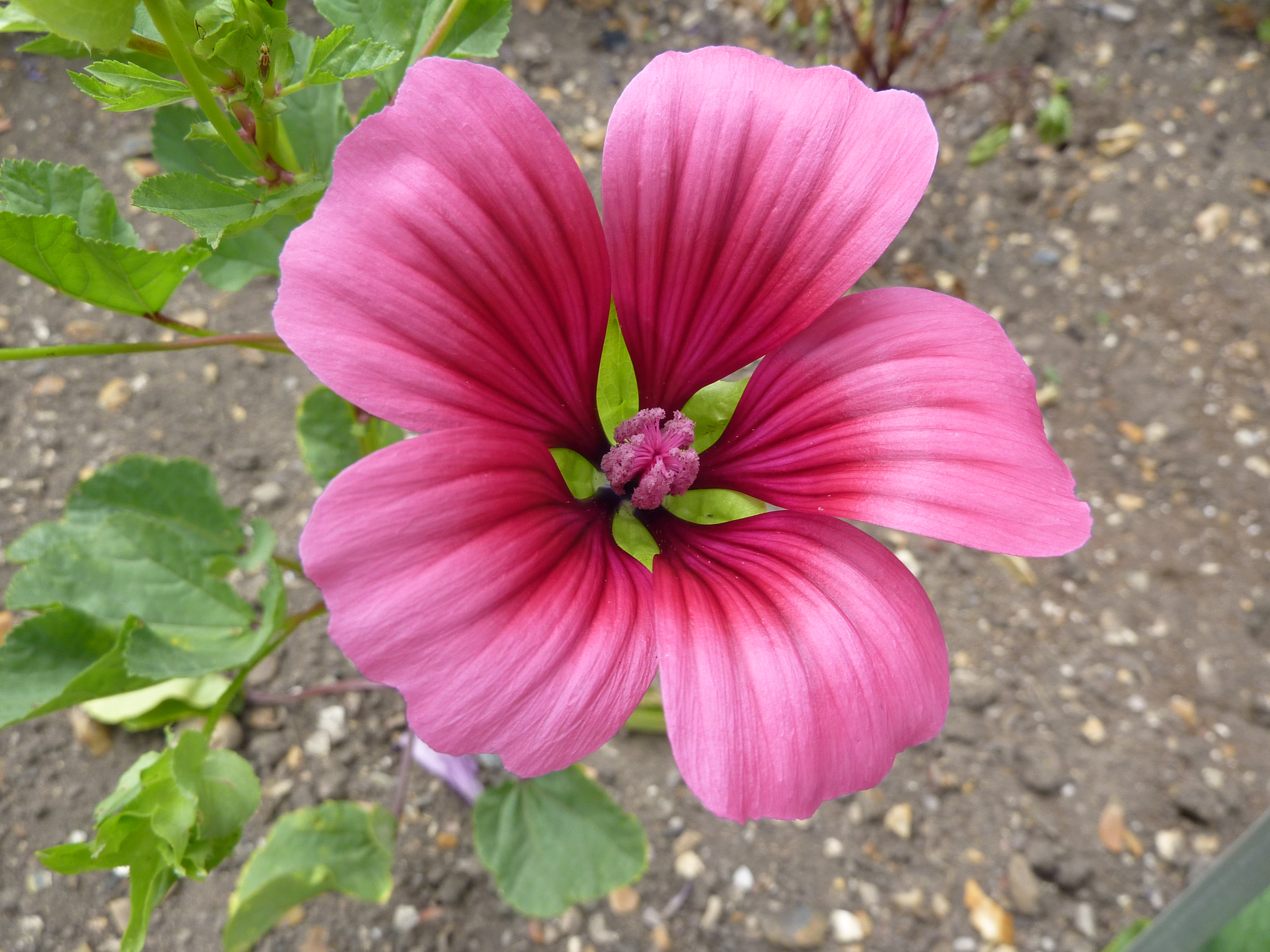
- Malope trifida

Scientific classification
- Kingdom: Plantae
- Clade: Tracheophytes
- Clade: Angiosperms
- Clade: Eudicots
- Clade: Rosids
- Order: Malvales
- Family: Malvaceae
- Subfamily: Malvoideae
- Tribe: Malveae
- Genus: Malope; L., 1753

Species
- See text

Synonyms
- Malacoides Fabr.

= Malope =

Genus of flowering plants

Malope is a genus in the family (Malvaceae). It includes four species native to the Mediterranean basin countries of southern Europe, northwestern Africa, and Turkey. Malope trifida is often used as an ornamental plant.

== Species ==
Four species are accepted.

- Malope anatolica Huber-Mor.
- Malope malacoides L.
- Malope rhodoleuca Maire
- Malope trifida Cav.
