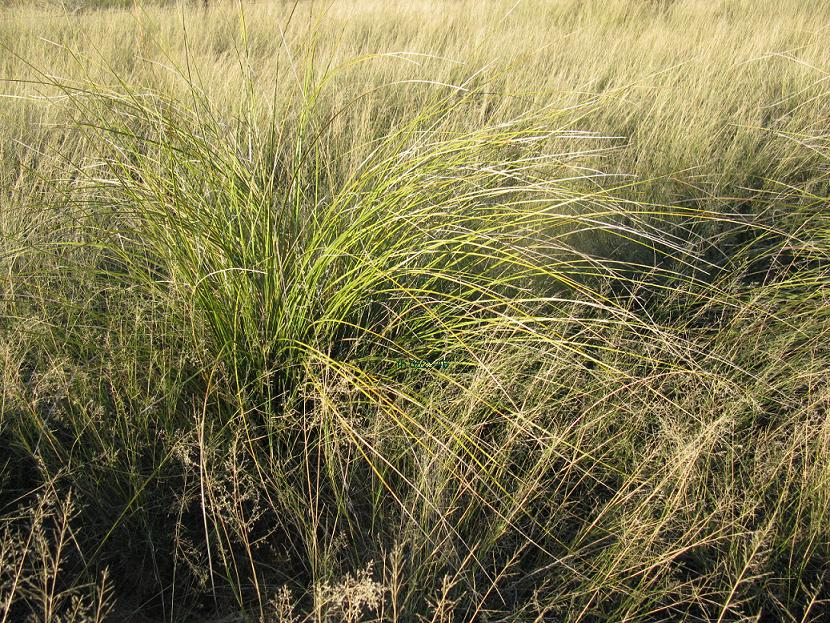
- in Cottonwood Canyon in Texas

Scientific classification
- Kingdom: Plantae
- Clade: Tracheophytes
- Clade: Angiosperms
- Clade: Monocots
- Order: Asparagales
- Family: Asparagaceae
- Subfamily: Convallarioideae
- Genus: Nolina
- Species: N. erumpens

Binomial name
- Nolina erumpens (Torr.) S.Wats.

Synonyms
- Dasylirion erumpens Torr. in W.H.Emory; Beaucarnea erumpens (Torr.) Baker

= Nolina erumpens =

Species of flowering plant

Nolina erumpens, the foothill beargrass, mesa sacahuista, or sand beargrass, is a member of the subfamily Convallarioideae (formerly Nolinoideae) of family Asparagaceae, native to New Mexico, Texas and adjacent regions of north Mexico.

== Description ==
The 2-2.6 feet long, 0.8 inch wide longitudinally grooved leaves of N. erumpens grow in wide tufts, and are sharp and serrated on the margins with loose-hanging filament-like appendages. The inflorescences are club shaped and rarely grow longer than the leaves, and bear numerous tiny, cream-colored flowers. The plant flowers in the late spring and early summer and the flowers attract ants, wasps and bees. Fruit is capsule-shaped and thin-walled.

== Cultivation ==
Nolina erumpens is extremely rare in amateur private collections but may be found in some botanical gardens among collections of succulent plants.
