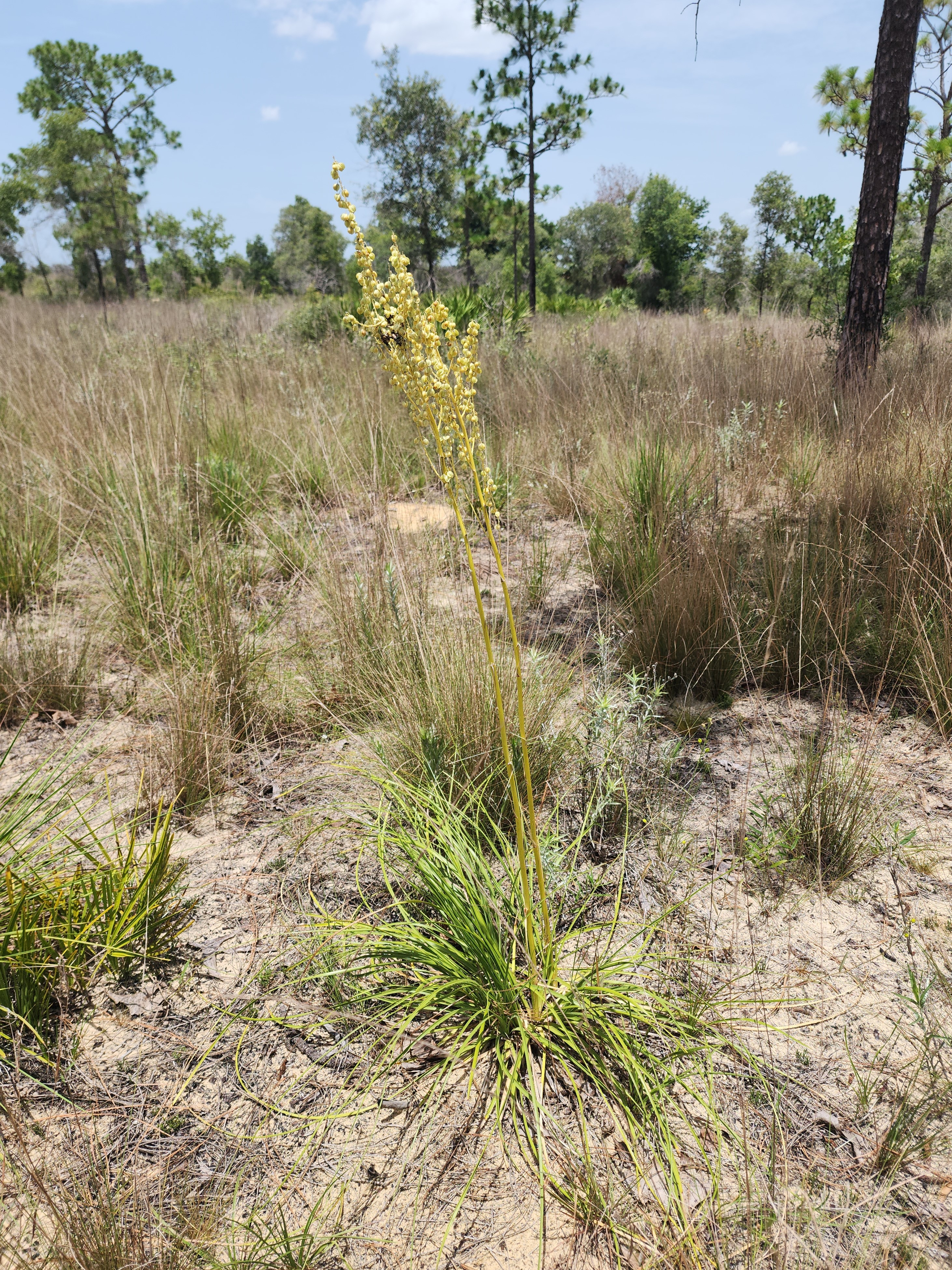
- Fruiting in upper terrace Lake Wales Ridge sandhill habitat

Conservation status
- Vulnerable (NatureServe)

Scientific classification
- Kingdom: Plantae
- Clade: Tracheophytes
- Clade: Angiosperms
- Clade: Monocots
- Order: Asparagales
- Family: Asparagaceae
- Subfamily: Convallarioideae
- Genus: Nolina
- Species: N. brittoniana

Binomial name
- Nolina brittoniana Nash

= Nolina brittoniana =

Species of flowering plant

Nolina brittoniana is a rare species of flowering plant in the asparagus family known by the common name Britton's beargrass. It is endemic to Florida, where there are 72 known populations, only a few large enough to be considered viable. It is federally listed as an endangered species of the United States.

== Description ==
This plant has no aboveground stem. It is a rosette of leaves attached at a bulblike base that arises from an underground caudex, a modified stem. The grasslike leaves are up to a meter long and rarely more than a centimeter wide. The edges are serrated with cartilaginous teeth. The inflorescence is a large, erect panicle up to a meter tall. It has small bracts and reduced leaves. The many small flowers have tepals measuring only 1 or 2 millimeters long. While the flowers are bisexual, they are functionally unisexual, with either the male or female part reduced and not functional. Most plants have either functionally male or female flowers, but some have both. Blooming occurs in March through May. The flowers give rise to winged capsules roughly a centimeter long by a centimeter wide. The plant reproduces sexually via seed and vegetatively by cloning.

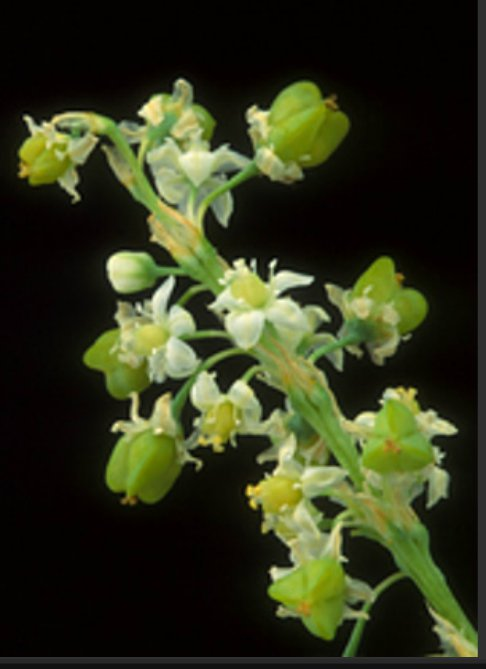
Flowers of the plant.

== Habitat ==
The plant is limited to seven counties in Central Florida, where it grows in several habitat types. It is known from various kinds of Florida scrub habitat, hammocks, and sandhills. The habitat types are different in many ways but they all have dry, well-drained, low-nutrient sandy soils and are all maintained by wildfire. The plant is present on Lake Wales Ridge, home to many rare Central Florida endemic plants. It grows alongside Polygala lewtonii, Polygonum dentoceras, Polygonum basiramia, Paronychia chartacea subsp. chartacea, Persea humilis, Liatris ohlingerae, Hypericum cumulicola, Conradina brevifolia, Calamintha ashei, and Bonamia grandiflora. The plant is relatively widespread compared to other rare local plants, but most of the populations are small and some are made up of only female individuals.

== Conservation ==
The beargrass is a member of plant communities that are maintained by a natural fire regime. Periodic wildfire halts the encroachment of large and woody vegetation, preventing ecological succession and keeping the canopy thin to allow sunlight to the herb layer below. These fire-maintained habitat types in Florida are largely degraded now because of a long-standing policy of fire suppression. They are overgrown, with thick canopies and a large amount of flammable organic buildup. Without fire, the beargrass does not grow well, its reproduction is inefficient, and its populations experience low recruitment. The beargrass flowers most profusely in the year following a fire. Many populations are located on privately owned land, and it is up to the landowner to decide whether or not to initiate controlled burns.

Habitat is also being lost to development and to agricultural operations, particularly citrus groves. Habitat fragmentation has occurred. However, the species likely always been sparse in widespread populations, even before human interference in the habitat, and conservation of remaining habitat fragments will probably be enough to maintain it. Prescribed burns should be part of this conservation plan.

While it is rare in the wild, the beargrass is cultivated in plant nurseries.

== Gallery ==
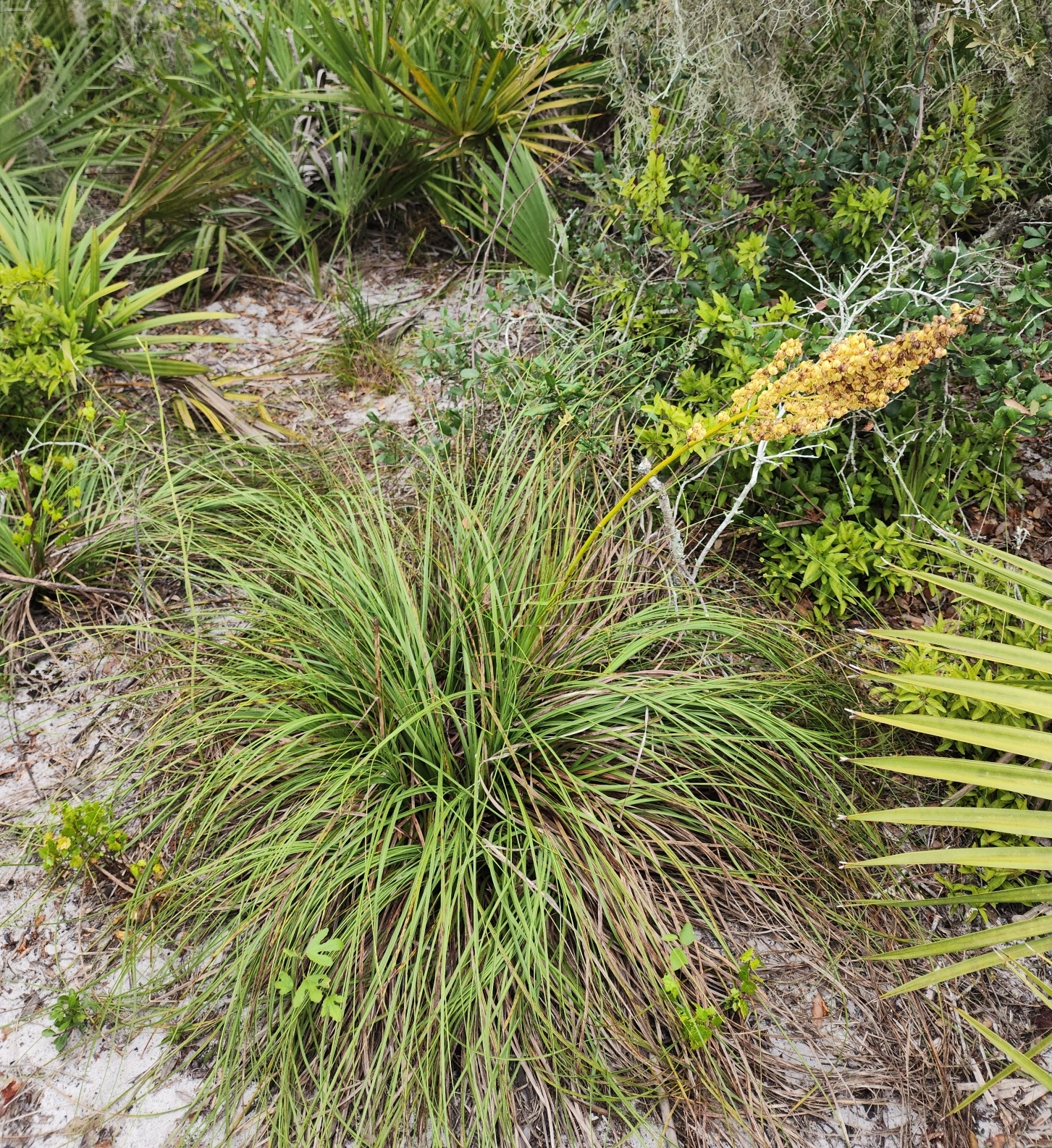
Fruiting in yellow sand xeric sandhill habitat

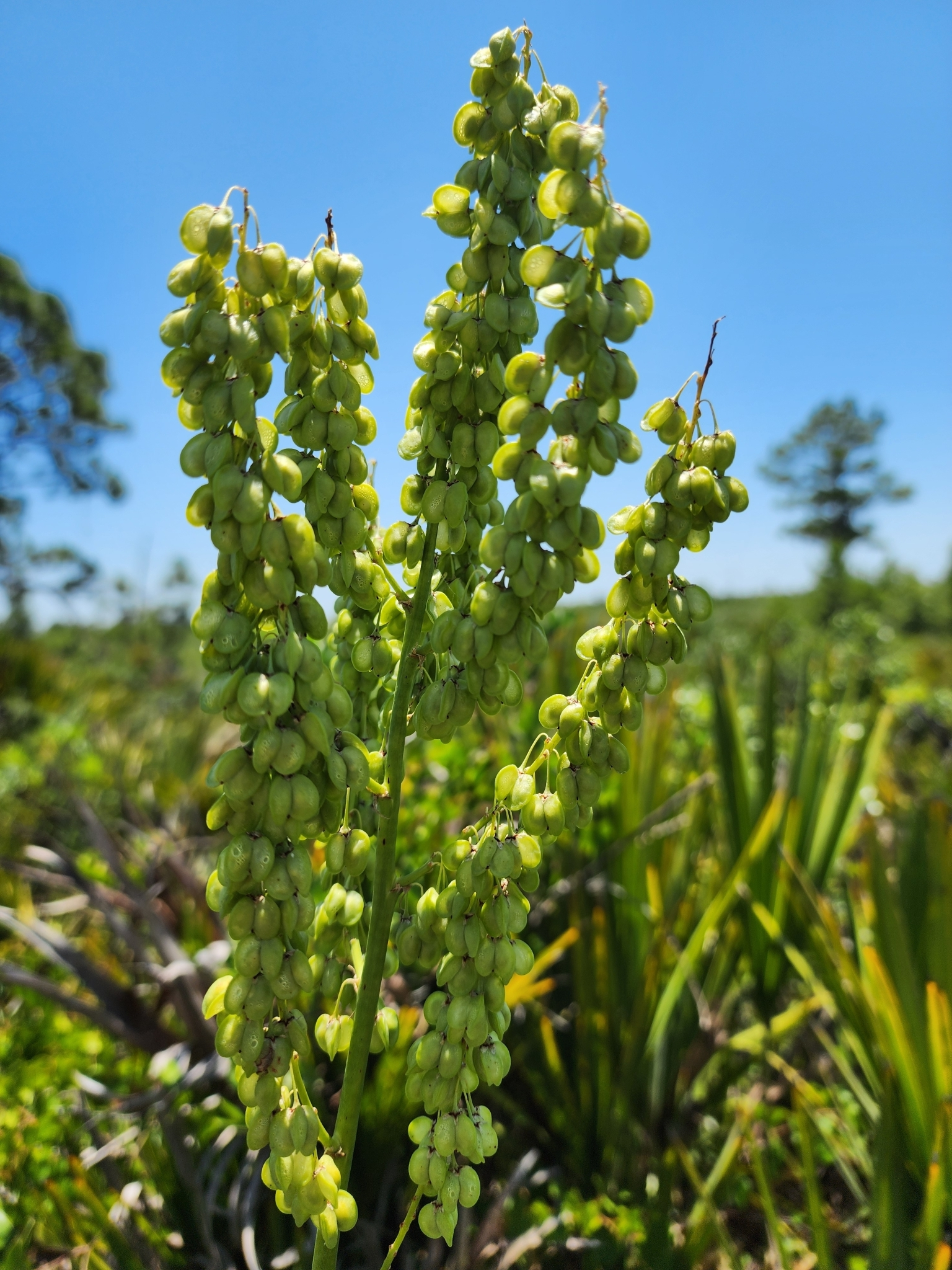
Fruit of the plant
