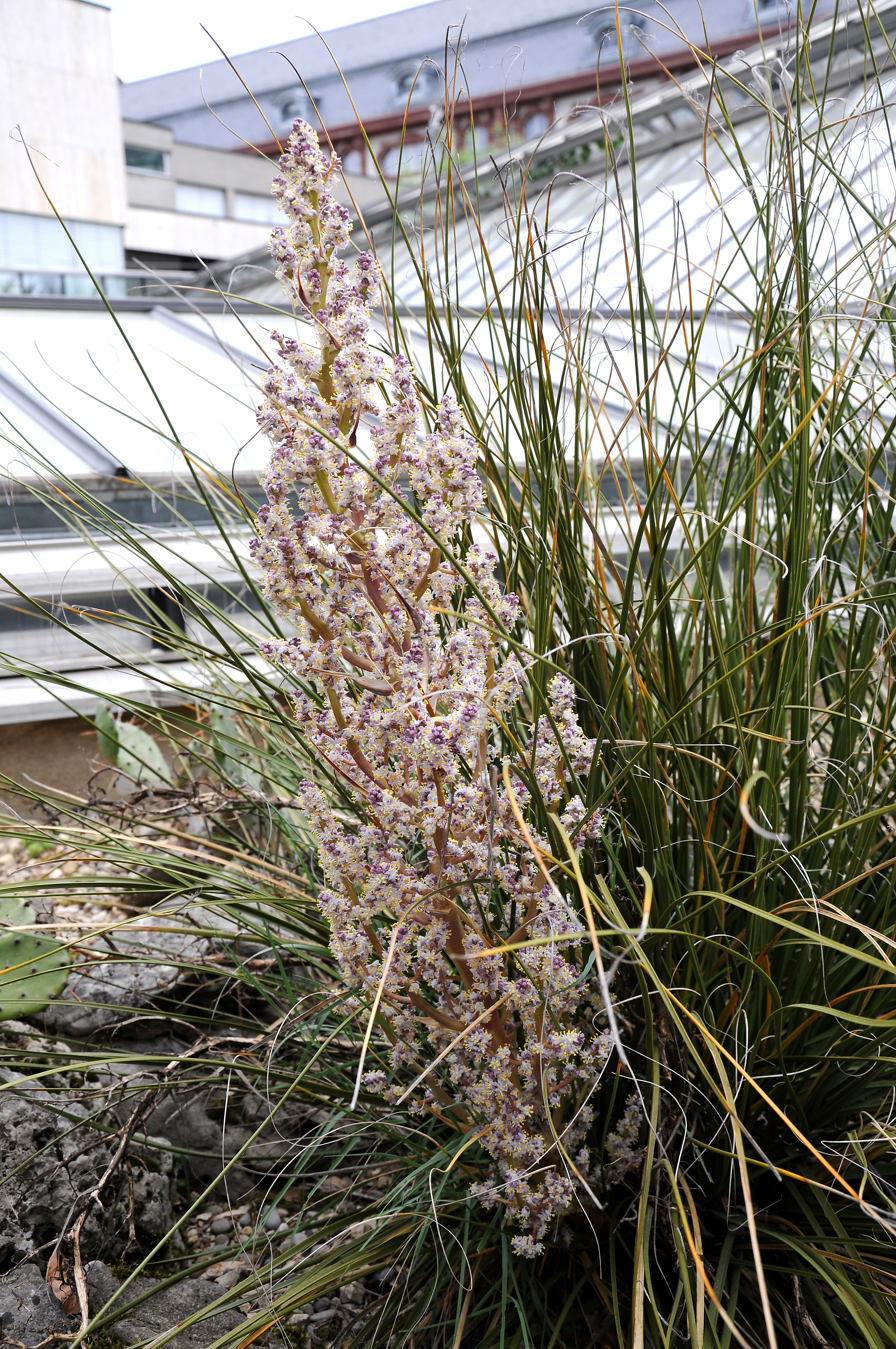

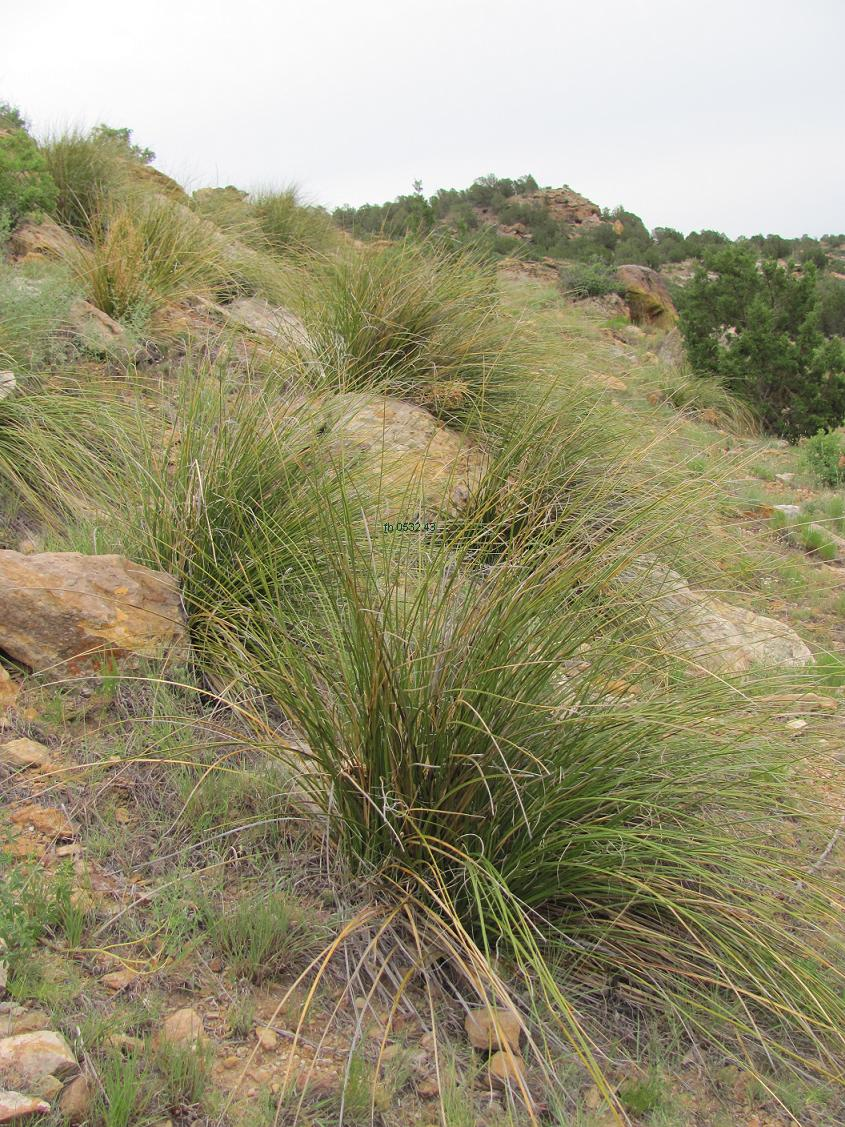

Conservation status
- Imperiled (NatureServe)

Scientific classification
- Kingdom: Plantae
- Clade: Tracheophytes
- Clade: Angiosperms
- Clade: Monocots
- Order: Asparagales
- Family: Asparagaceae
- Subfamily: Nolinoideae
- Genus: Nolina
- Species: N. greenei

Binomial name
- Nolina greenei S. Wats. ex Trel.

= Nolina greenei =

Species of flowering plant

Nolina greenei, woodland beargrass, is a plant species native to the United States. It is widespread in New Mexico and also reported from Colorado (Las Animas County), Texas (Deaf Smith and Garza Counties) and Oklahoma (Cimarron County).

Nolina greenei grows in rocky locations such as limestone outcrops and old lava flows, often in grasslands or in pine-oak woodlands at elevations of 1200–2000 m. It is a perennial rosette forming plant with an underground caudex. Leaves are long and narrow, sometimes over 100 cm long but rarely more than 1 cm wide. They sometimes have sharp teeth along the margins. Flowering stalk is up to 20 cm high, with a large panicle of white flowers with purple midveins. Fruit is a dry, inflated capsule up to 5 mm across.

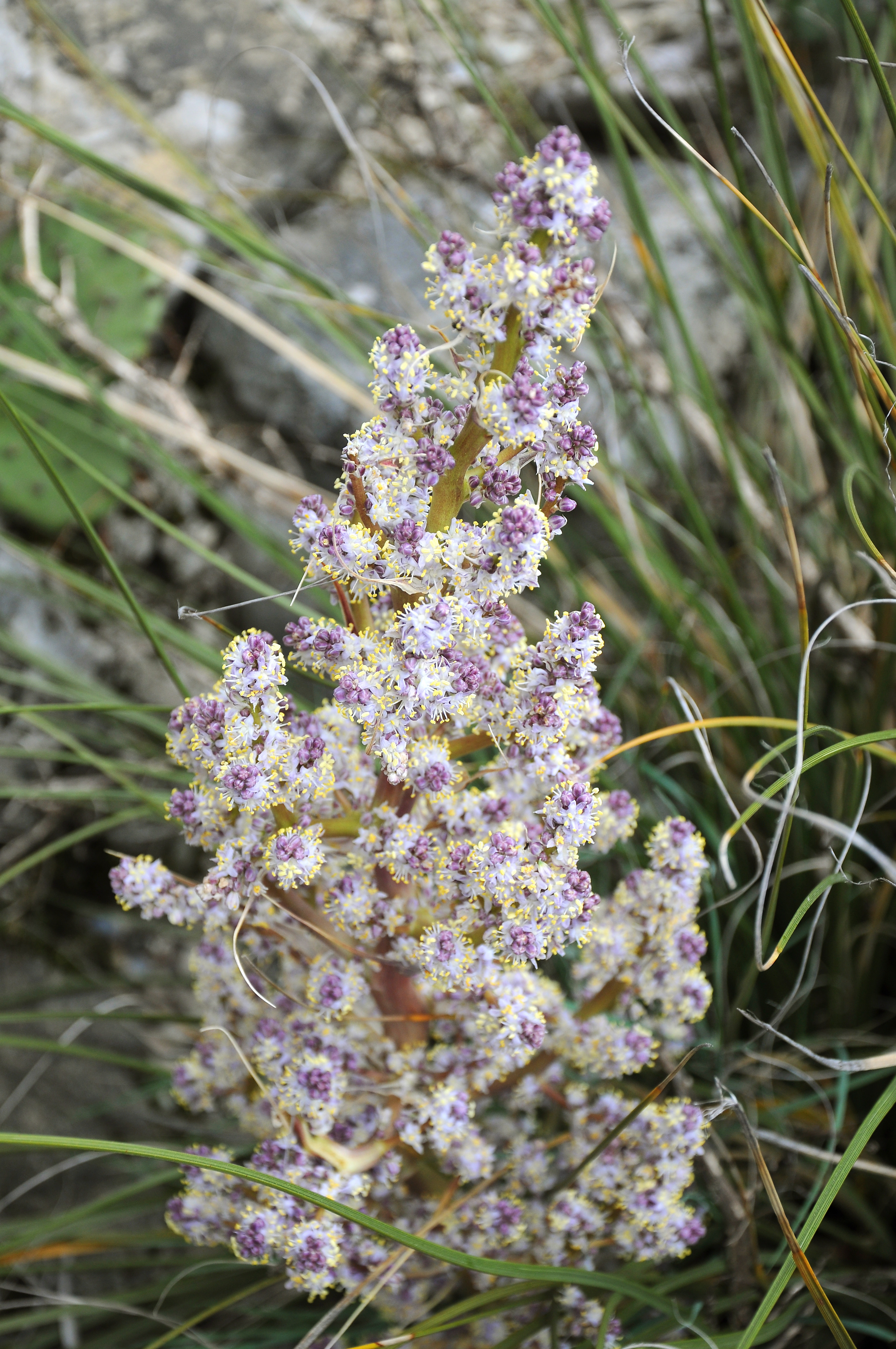

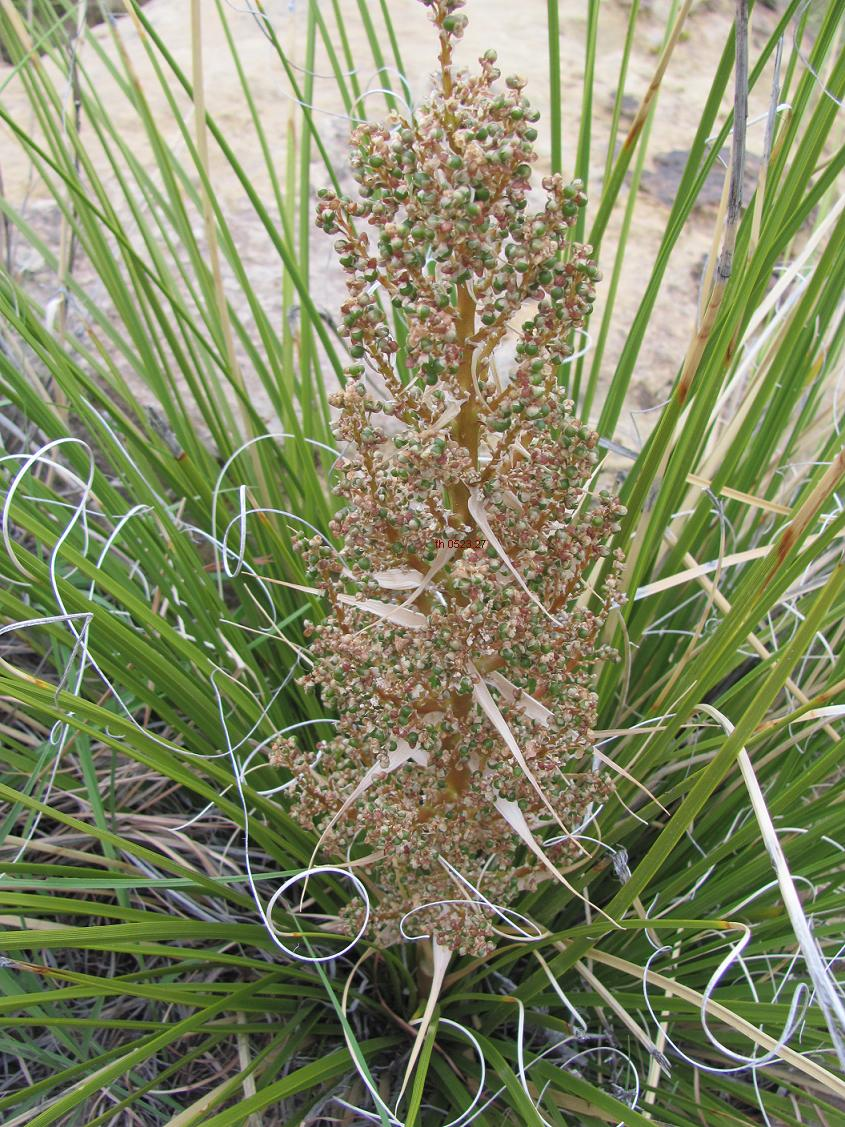
