= Hedysarum glomeratum =

Scientific classification
- Kingdom: Plantae
- Clade: Tracheophytes
- Clade: Angiosperms
- Clade: Eudicots
- Clade: Rosids
- Order: Fabales
- Family: Fabaceae
- Subfamily: Faboideae
- Genus: Hedysarum
- Species: H. glomeratum

Binomial name
- Hedysarum glomeratum F.Dietr.

Synonyms
- Hedysarum capitatum

Species of plant

Hedysarum glomeratum is a species of flowering plant in the family Fabaceae.

== Sources ==
This article incorporates text from a free content work. Licensed under CC0 (license statement/permission). Text taken from Hedysarum glomeratum. Encyclopedia of Life.
