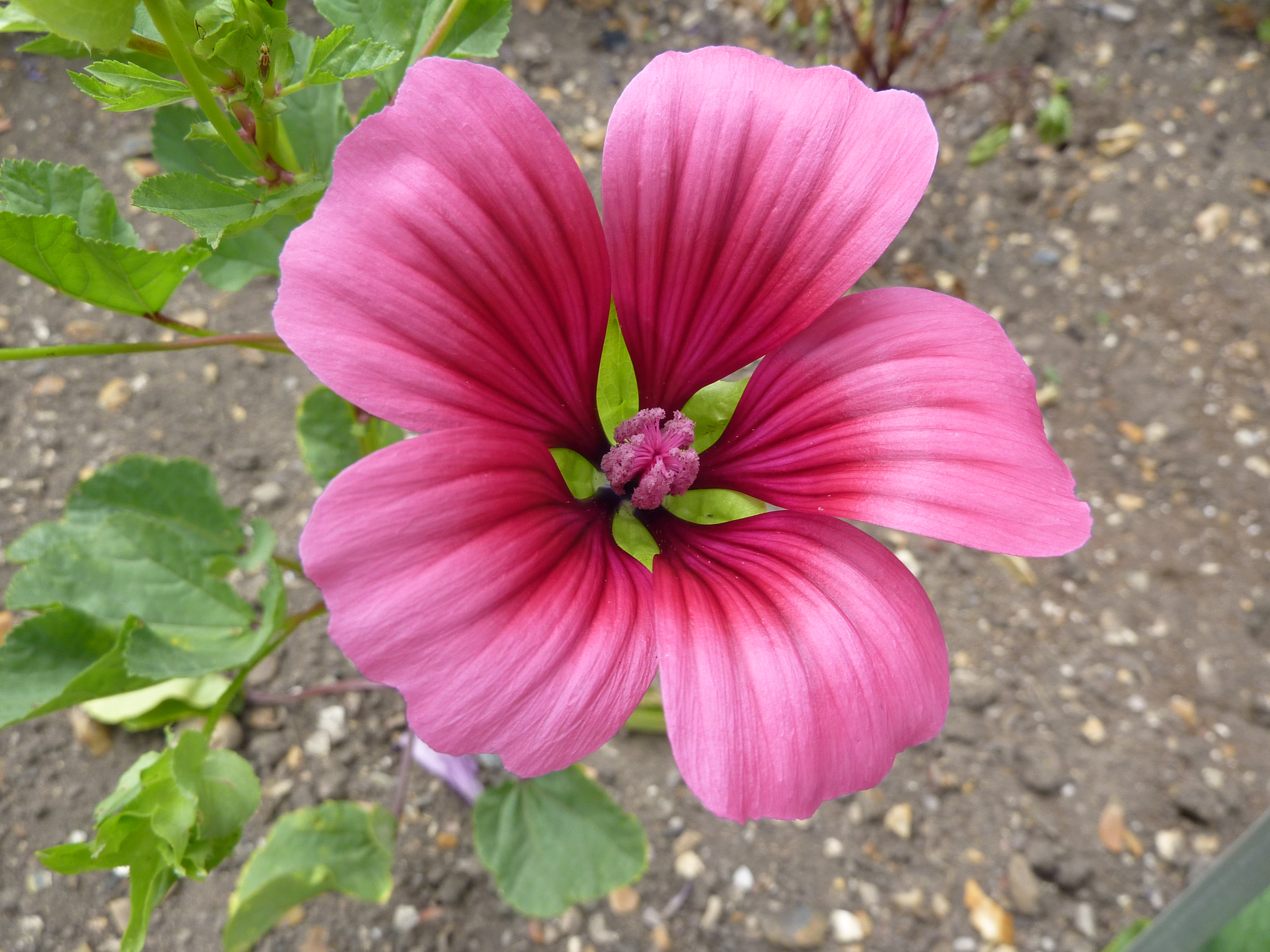

Scientific classification
- Kingdom: Plantae
- Clade: Tracheophytes
- Clade: Angiosperms
- Clade: Eudicots
- Clade: Rosids
- Order: Malvales
- Family: Malvaceae
- Genus: Malope
- Species: M. trifida

Binomial name
- Malope trifida Cav.

= Malope trifida =

Annual Malope

Species of flowering plant

Malope trifida (mallow-wort, annual malope, maloppi, purple Spanish mallow; syn. Malope ciliata F.G. Dietr., Malope grandiflora F.G.Dietr., Malope malacoides var trifida (Cav.) Samp.) is a species of Malope native to the Western Mediterranean Region. This plant is often used as an ornamental plant.
