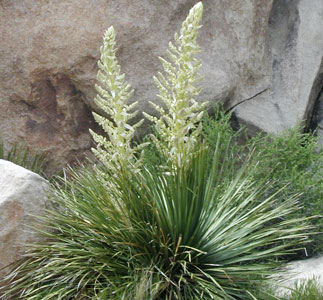

Scientific classification
- Kingdom: Plantae
- Clade: Tracheophytes
- Clade: Angiosperms
- Clade: Monocots
- Order: Asparagales
- Family: Asparagaceae
- Subfamily: Convallarioideae
- Genus: Nolina
- Species: N. parryi

Binomial name
- Nolina parryi S.Watson

Synonyms
- Nolina bigelovii var. parryi (S.Watson) L.D.Benson; Nolina bigelovii subsp. parryi (S.Watson) A.E.Murray; Nolina parryi subsp. wolfii Munz; Nolina bigelovii var. wolfii (Munz) L.D.Benson in L.D.Benson & R.A.Darrow; Nolina wolfii (Munz) Munz; Nolina bigelovii subsp. wolfii (Munz) A.E.Murray

= Nolina parryi =

Species of flowering plant

Nolina parryi (Parry's beargrass, Parry nolina, or giant nolina) is a flowering plant that is native to Baja California and Southern California.

== Description ==
It can exceed 2 m (6 1/2 ft) in height, its inflorescence reaching 4 m (13 ft). The trunk is up to 60 cm (24 in) in diameter. The leaves are borne in dense rosettes, each with up to 220 stiff linear leaves up to 140 cm (55 in) long and 2–4 cm (1–1 1/2 in) broad. It is dioecious, with separate male and female plants; the flowers are white, about 6 mm (1/4 in) wide, produced on the 60 cm (24 in) tall plume-like inflorescence from April to June.

== Distribution and habitat ==
Native to Baja California and Southern California, the species can be found in deserts and mountains at altitudes of up to 2,100 m (6,900 ft).

== Uses ==
Native Americans consumed the young stems and wove the leaves into baskets.
