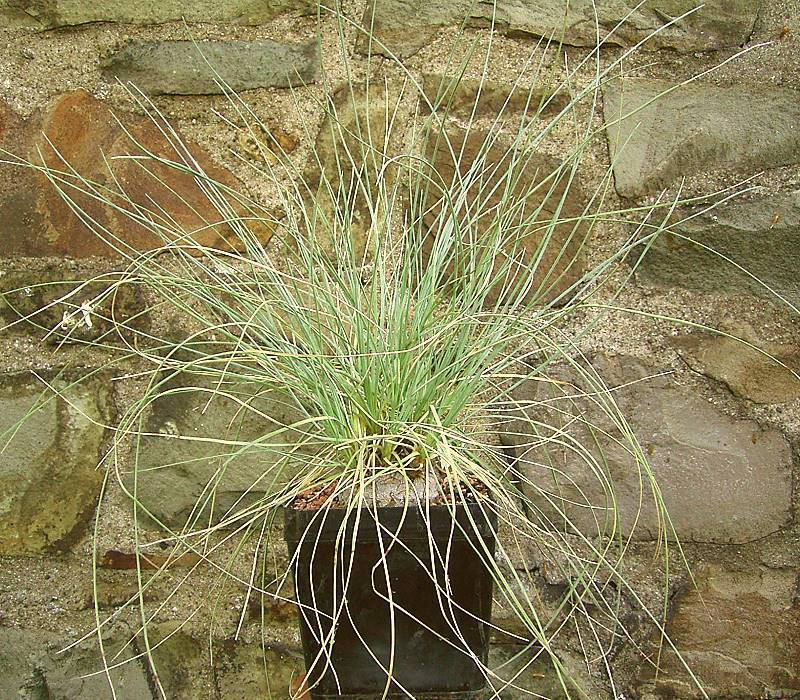
- Calibanus hookeri

Scientific classification
- Kingdom: Plantae
- Clade: Tracheophytes
- Clade: Angiosperms
- Clade: Monocots
- Order: Asparagales
- Family: Asparagaceae
- Subfamily: Convallarioideae
- Genus: Calibanus; Rose

Type species
- Calibanus caespitosus (syn of C. hookeri) (Scheidw.) Rose.

= Calibanus =

Genus of flowering plants

Calibanus was a genus of two species of flowering plants, both evergreen succulents from dry areas of northeastern Mexico.The genus was subsumed in the genus Beaucarnea in the year 2014. The APG III classification system places Beaucarnea in the family Asparagaceae, subfamily Convallarioideae (formerly the family Ruscaceae.) The now-defunct Calibanus was formerly included in the Agavaceae (now Agavoideae) but was separated from them, for it is polycarpic and dioecious. Its name refers to the monster Caliban, an antagonist in Shakespeare's The Tempest.

Calibanus is dioecious. It is extremely drought-tolerant, with a slow-growing habit. It has tuberous roots called caudices. The caudex can grow to 1m in diameter, with clumps of green-blue, coarse, grasslike, wiry leaves 50 cm long rising from the center and arching down with age. Clusters of tiny, creamy-white flowers, sometimes tinged with pink or purple, are rigid, about 10–20 cm long. Female plants bear globose, ovoid, 3-angled berries with ellipsoid seeds.

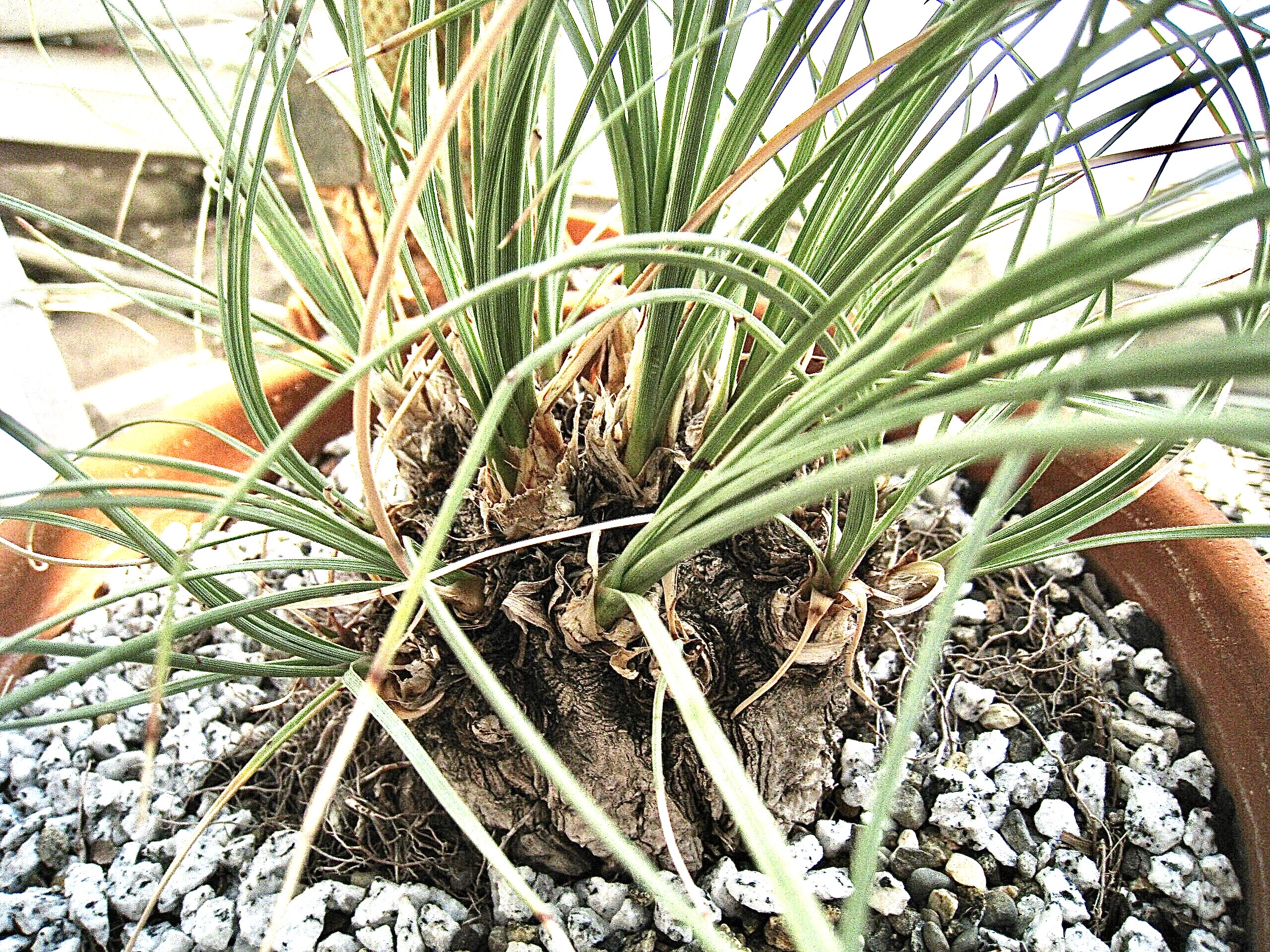
Closeup of leaves and caudex of Calibanus hookeri

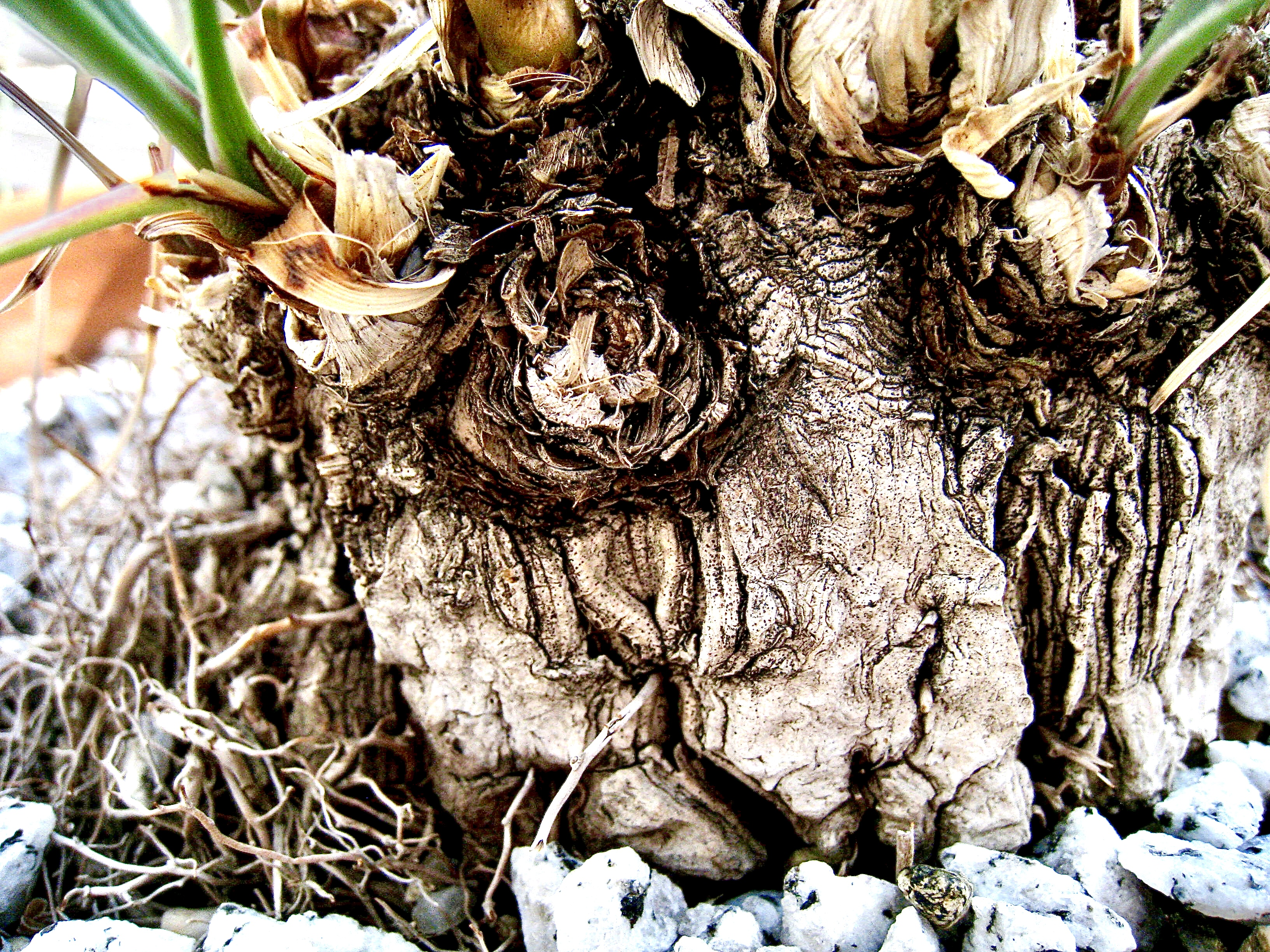
Detail of corky bark of caudex of Calibanus hookeri

== Species ==
1. Calibanus glassianus L.Hern. & Zamudio - Guanajuato
2. Calibanus hookeri (Lem.) Trel. - San Luis Potosí, Hidalgo
