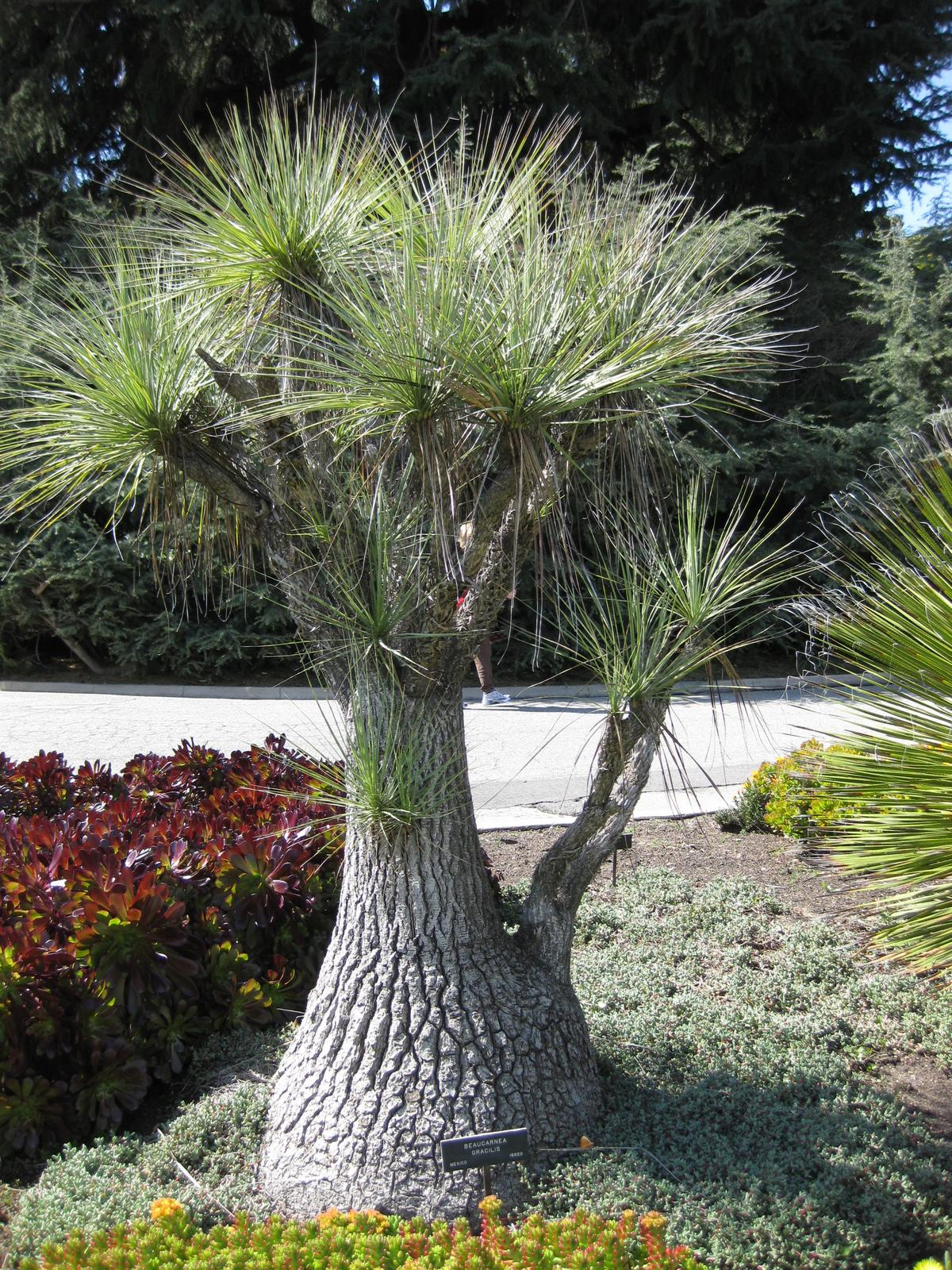

Conservation status
- Endangered (IUCN 3.1)
- CITES Appendix II (CITES)

Scientific classification
- Kingdom: Plantae
- Clade: Tracheophytes
- Clade: Angiosperms
- Clade: Monocots
- Order: Asparagales
- Family: Asparagaceae
- Subfamily: Convallarioideae
- Genus: Beaucarnea
- Species: B. gracilis

Binomial name
- Beaucarnea gracilis Lem.

Synonyms
- Beaucarnea oedipus Rose; Dasylirion gracile (Lem.) J.F.Macbr. nom. illeg.; Nolina gracilis (Lem.) Cif. & Giacom.; Nolina histrix Trel.

= Beaucarnea gracilis =

Species of flowering plant

Beaucarnea gracilis is a species of flowering plant in the Asparagaceae family. It is native to Puebla, and northern parts of Oaxaca, in Mexico, where it is endemic to the Tehuacán Valley matorral. It grows primarily in the seasonally dry tropical biome.

It is an arborescent species, and plants can form large trees over time. It has a stem that is basally enormously swollen and circular in cross-section, with modest branching, growing up to 12m tall.

The specific name gracilis means thin, presumably referring to the leaves which, as in Beaucarnea recurvata, are long and thin (30-60cm long and 4-7mm wide), but in this species they are erect, very glaucous and with margins minutely but sharply roughened.

As with many species of Beaucarnea, Beaucarnea gracilis has been placed in different genera, including Nolina (as Nolina gracilis), and Dasylirion (as Dasylirion gracile); but modern research supports Beaucarnea existing as a genus, with Beaucarnea gracilis accepted as a species of Beaucarnea.
