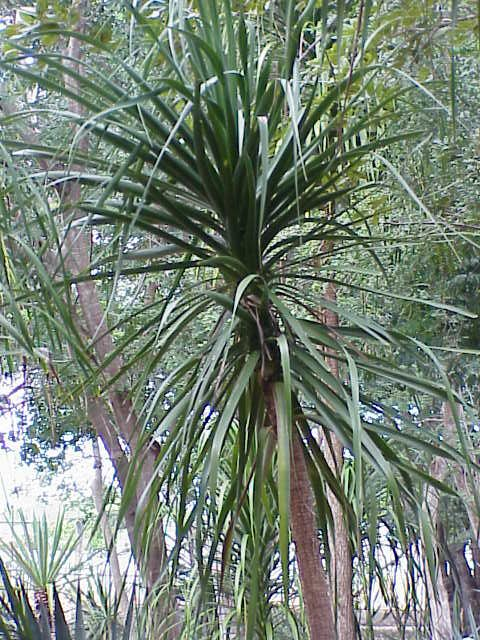
- Beaucarnea pliabilis
- CITES Appendix II

Scientific classification
- Kingdom: Plantae
- Clade: Tracheophytes
- Clade: Angiosperms
- Clade: Monocots
- Order: Asparagales
- Family: Asparagaceae
- Subfamily: Convallarioideae
- Genus: Beaucarnea; Lem.

Type species
- Beaucarnea recurvata

Synonyms
- Calibanus Rose

= Beaucarnea =

Genus of flowering plants

Beaucarnea is a genus of flowering plants native to Mexico and Central America. In the APG III classification system, it is placed in the family Asparagaceae, subfamily Convallarioideae (formerly the family Ruscaceae). Beaucarnea is sometimes treated as a synonym of the genus Nolina, with the species being then transferred to that genus. However, recent research shows that Beaucarnea should be treated as an independent genus.

The species are small tropical xerophytic trees growing to 6–10 m tall, with a trunk 20–40 cm diameter with a flared base; young plants are single-stemmed, branching only after flowering. The leaves are evergreen, linear, strap-shaped, 0.5-1.8 m long and 1.5–2 cm broad, leathery in texture, with a finely serrated margin. The flowers are produced only on old trees, forming on large panicles 75–110 cm long, the individual flowers numerous but very small (1.5 mm diameter), greenish-white, with six tepals.

== Calibanus ==
The now defunct genus Calibanus was first formally described in 1906 by Joseph Nelson Rose, with Calibanus including two species. More recent research using molecular (phylogenetic) and morphological findings demonstrated that both former Calibanus species were closely related to Beaucarnea species, leading to both former Calibanus species being transferred to the genus Beaucarnea.

The affected species are:

- Beaucarnea glassiana (L.Hern. & Zamudio) V.Rojas-Piña; formally Calibanus glassianus L.Hern. & Zamudio
- Beaucarnea hookeri (Lem.) Trel.; formerly Calibanus hookeri (Lem.) Trel.

== Species ==
Plants of the World Online accepts the following species:

| Image | Scientific name | Distribution |
|---|---|---|
| | Beaucarnea compacta L.Hern. & Zamudio | Guanajuato |
| | Beaucarnea glassiana (L.Hern. & Zamudio) V.Rojas-Piña | Guanajuato |
| | Beaucarnea goldmanii Rose | Chiapas, Guatemala, El Salvador |
| | Beaucarnea gracilis Lem. | Puebla, Oaxaca |
| | Beaucarnea guatemalensis Rose | Guatemala, Nicaragua |
| | Beaucarnea hiriartiae L.Hern. | Guerrero |
| | Beaucarnea hookeri (Lem.) Baker | San Luis Potosí, Hidalgo |
| | Beaucarnea olsonii V. Rojas & L.O. Alvarado | Puebla, Oaxaca |
| | Beaucarnea pliabilis (Baker) Rose | Campeche, Quintana Roo, Yucatán, Guatemala, Belize |
| | Beaucarnea purpusii Rose | Puebla, Oaxaca |
| | Beaucarnea recurvata (K. Koch & Fintelm.) Lem. | Oaxaca, Puebla, San Luis Potosí, Tamaulipas, Veracruz |
| | Beaucarnea sanctomariana L.Hern. | Oaxaca |
| | Beaucarnea stricta (K.Koch & Fintelm.) Lem. | Oaxaca |

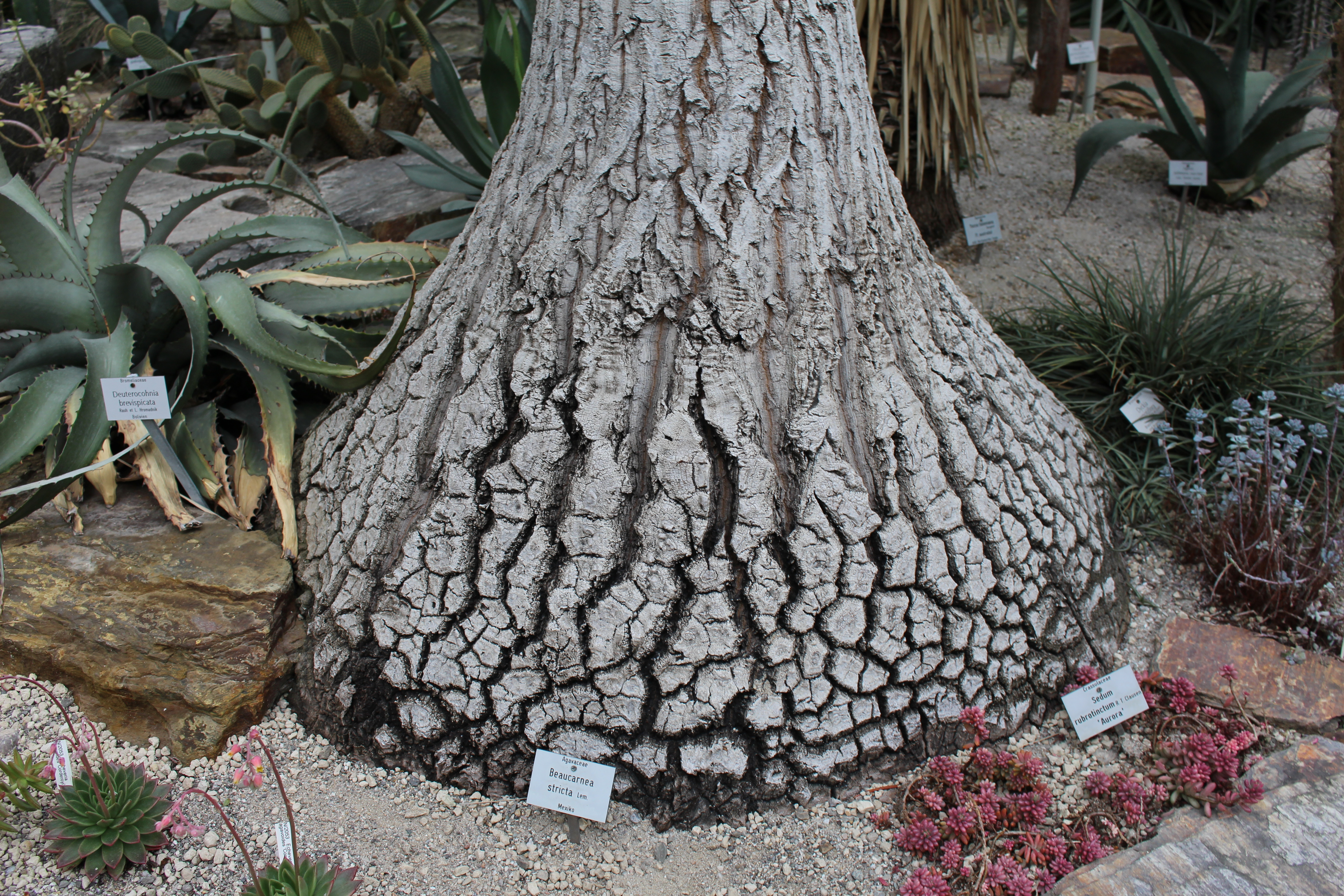
Beaucarnea stricta trunk
