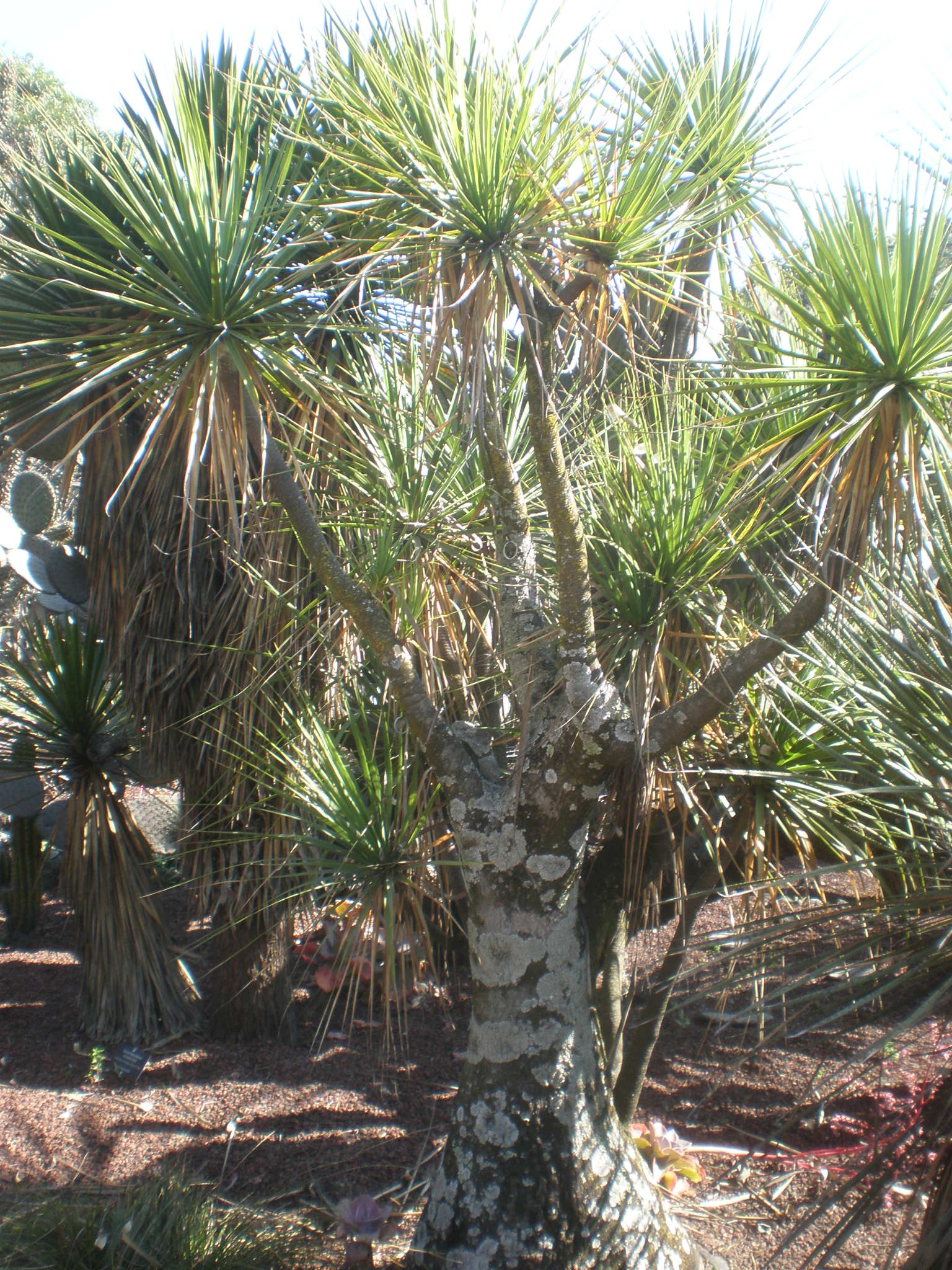

Conservation status
- Critically Endangered (IUCN 3.1)
- CITES Appendix II

Scientific classification
- Kingdom: Plantae
- Clade: Embryophytes
- Clade: Tracheophytes
- Clade: Spermatophytes
- Clade: Angiosperms
- Clade: Monocots
- Order: Asparagales
- Family: Asparagaceae
- Subfamily: Convallarioideae
- Genus: Beaucarnea
- Species: B. hiriartiae

Binomial name
- Beaucarnea hiriartiae L.Hern.

= Beaucarnea hiriartiae =

Species of flowering plant

Beaucarnea hiriartiae is a plant in the family Asparagaceae, native to Mexico. The species is named for the botanist Patricia Hiriart Valencia.

== Description ==
Beaucarnea hiriartiae grows as a tree-like plant up to 8 metres (30 ft) tall, with a trunk swelling up to 2 m (7 ft) in diameter at the base. The bark is smooth. The leaves measure up to 90 cm (35 in) long. The inflorescences feature yellow-white flowers.

== Distribution and habitat ==
Beaucarnea hiriartiae is endemic to Mexico, where it is confined to the area around Cañon del Zopilote in Guerrero. Its habitat is in dry forests on steep slopes, at altitudes of 250–700 m (800–2,300 ft).

== Conservation ==
Beaucarnea hiriartiae has been assessed as critically endangered on the IUCN Red List. It is threatened by conversion of its habitat for agriculture, roads and urban development. It is also threatened by illegal harvesting for the ornamental plant trade. The species' range includes a protected area.
