= Beaucarnea sanctomariana =

Conservation status
- Endangered (IUCN 3.1)

Scientific classification
- Kingdom: Plantae
- Clade: Tracheophytes
- Clade: Angiosperms
- Clade: Monocots
- Order: Asparagales
- Family: Asparagaceae
- Subfamily: Convallarioideae
- Genus: Beaucarnea
- Species: B. sanctomariana

Binomial name
- Beaucarnea sanctomariana L.Hern.

Species of flowering plant

Beaucarnea sanctomariana is a tree in the family Asparagaceae, native to Mexico. The species is named for the town of Santa María Chimalapa in Oaxaca.

== Description ==
Beaucarnea sanctomariana grows up to 7 metres (20 ft) tall. Its conical trunk swells to a base diameter of up to 1.5 m (5 ft). The long, thin leaves measure up to 85 cm (30 in) long. Its inflorescences feature cream-yellow flowers. The ellipsoid to roundish fruits measure up to 0.8 cm (0.3 in) long.

== Distribution and habitat ==
Beaucarnea sanctomariana is endemic to Mexico, where it is confined to the Chimalapas region of the Isthmus of Tehuantepec in Oaxaca. Its habitat is on slopes facing the Gulf of Mexico, at altitudes of 200–700 m (700–2,300 ft).

== Conservation ==
Beaucarnea sanctomariana has been assessed as endangered on the IUCN Red List. It is primarily threatened by illegal harvesting for the ornamental plant trade. It is also threatened by fragmentation of its forest habitat for development. The species is not found in any protected areas.
