= Beaucarnea olsonii =

Conservation status
- Endangered (IUCN 3.1)
- CITES Appendix II (CITES)

Scientific classification
- Kingdom: Plantae
- Clade: Tracheophytes
- Clade: Angiosperms
- Clade: Monocots
- Order: Asparagales
- Family: Asparagaceae
- Subfamily: Convallarioideae
- Genus: Beaucarnea
- Species: B. olsonii

Binomial name
- Beaucarnea olsonii V.Rojas-Piña & L.O.Alvarado

Species of flowering plant

Beaucarnea olsonii is a plant in the family Asparagaceae, native to Mexico. The species is named for the botanist Mark E. Olson.

== Description ==
Beaucarnea olsonii grows as a tree-like plant up to 5 metres (16 ft) tall. The trunk is greatly swollen at the base, with a diameter of up to 4 m (13 ft). Its gray bark is scaly. The sword-shaped leaves measure up to 85 cm (30 in) long. Its inflorescences bear whitish flowers.

== Distribution and habitat ==
Beaucarnea olsonii is endemic to Mexico, where it is found in Puebla and Oaxaca. Its habitat is in deciduous forests, on hillsides at altitudes of 1,200–1,500 m (4,000–5,000 ft).

== Conservation ==
Beaucarnea olsonii has been assessed as endangered on the IUCN Red List. It is threatened by conversion of its habitat for agriculture and human settlement and by fires. The species does not occur in any protected areas.
