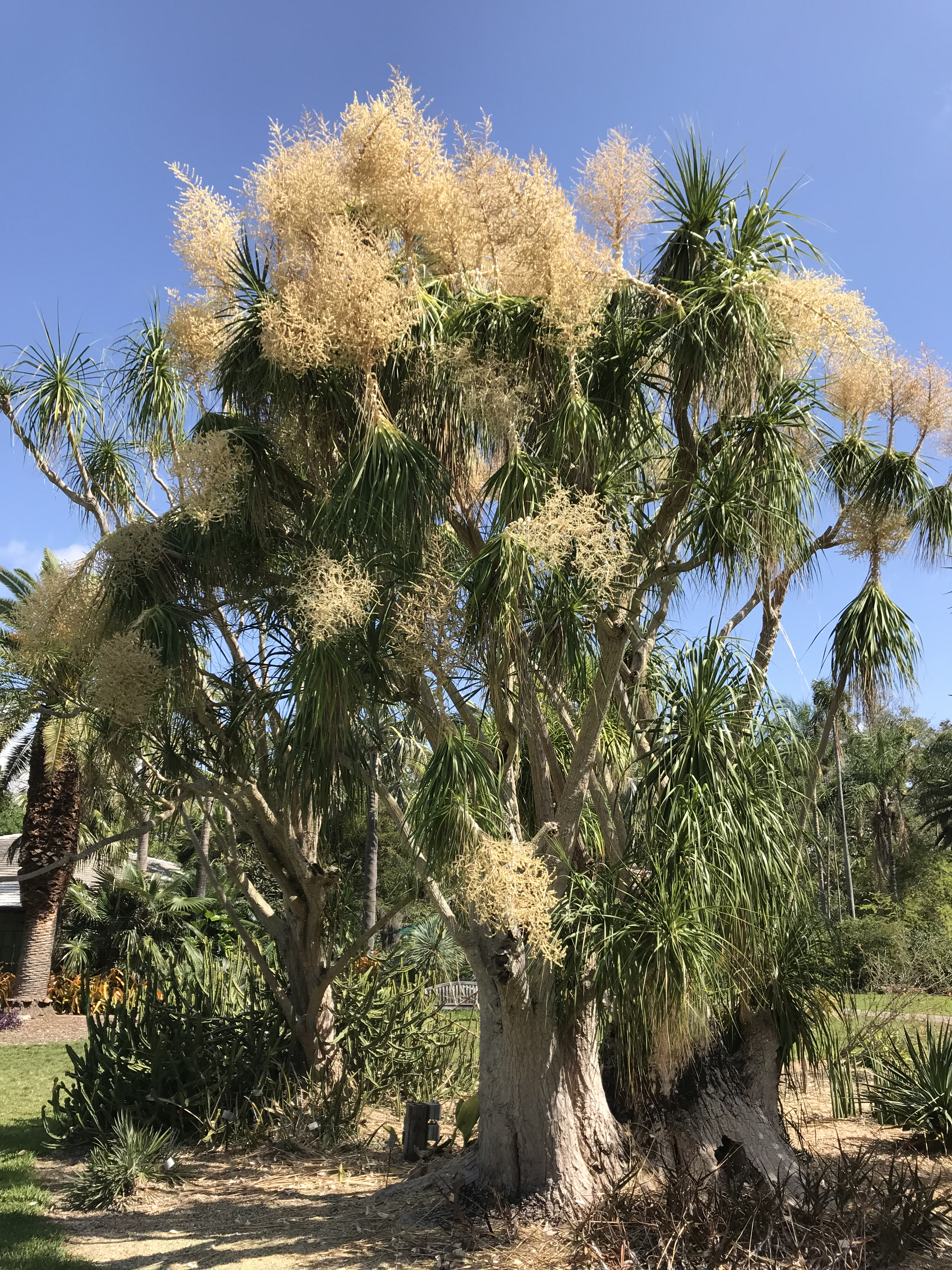
- At Fairchild Tropical Botanic Garden, Florida

Conservation status
- Vulnerable (IUCN 3.1)
- CITES Appendix II (CITES)

Scientific classification
- Kingdom: Plantae
- Clade: Tracheophytes
- Clade: Angiosperms
- Clade: Monocots
- Order: Asparagales
- Family: Asparagaceae
- Subfamily: Convallarioideae
- Genus: Beaucarnea
- Species: B. pliabilis

Binomial name
- Beaucarnea pliabilis (Baker) Rose

Synonyms
- Beaucarnea ameliae Lundell; Beaucarnea petenensis (Lundell) Lundell; Dasylirion pliabile Baker; Dracaena petenensis Lundell; Nolina pliabilis (Baker) Lundell

= Beaucarnea pliabilis =

Species of flowering plant

Beaucarnea pliabilis is a tree in the family Asparagaceae, native to the Yucatán Peninsula. It grows up to 10 metres (30 ft) tall.

== Distribution and habitat ==
Beaucarnea pliabilis is endemic to the Yucatán Peninsula, including parts of Mexico, Belize and Guatemala. Its habitat is in dry forest, moist lowland forest and swamp forest, from sea level to 800 m (2,600 ft).

== Conservation ==
Beaucarnea pliabilis has been assessed as vulnerable on the IUCN Red List. It is threatened by conversion of land for urban development and cattle farming. Fires and hurricanes pose an additional threat in the region. The species is increasingly threatened by illegal harvesting for the ornamental plant trade. The tree's range includes numerous protected areas, however population decline has continued.

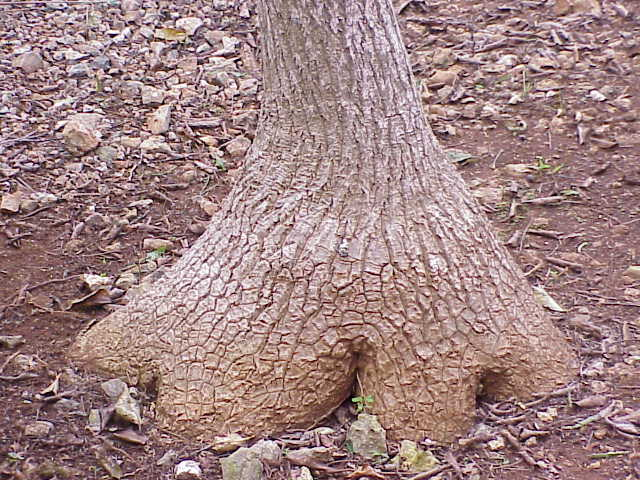
Characteristic swollen base or "elephant foot"
