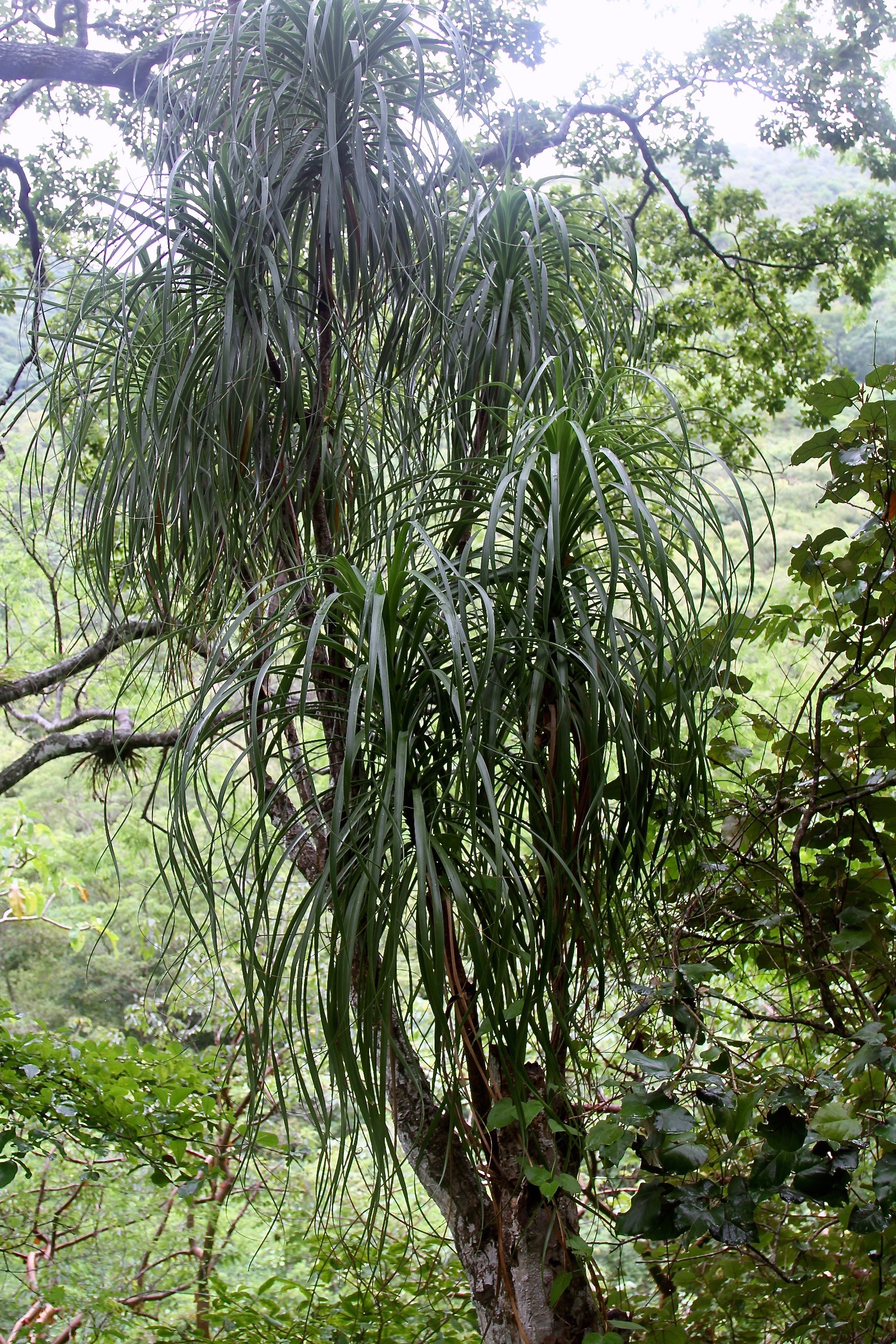
- In Chiapas

Conservation status
- Vulnerable (IUCN 3.1)
- CITES Appendix II (CITES)

Scientific classification
- Kingdom: Plantae
- Clade: Tracheophytes
- Clade: Angiosperms
- Clade: Monocots
- Order: Asparagales
- Family: Asparagaceae
- Subfamily: Convallarioideae
- Genus: Beaucarnea
- Species: B. goldmanii

Binomial name
- Beaucarnea goldmanii Rose

= Beaucarnea goldmanii =

Species of flowering plant

Beaucarnea goldmanii is a tree in the family Asparagaceae. It is native to Mexico and northern Central America.

== Description ==
Beaucarnea goldmanii grows up to 12 metres (40 ft) tall. The base of the trunk is swollen. Its bark is furrowed. The slender leaves measure up to 90 cm (40 in) long.

== Distribution and habitat ==
Beaucarnea goldmanii is native to Mexico, Guatemala, Honduras and El Salvador. In Mexico, the species is confined to Chiapas. Its habitat is in deciduous tropical forests, at altitudes of 400–1,400 m (1,300–4,600 ft).

== Conservation ==
Beaucarnea goldmanii has been assessed as vulnerable on the IUCN Red List. It is threatened by agriculture, including damage to young trees from cattle. It is also threatened by illegal harvesting for the ornamental plant trade. The species' range includes Sumidero Canyon in Chiapas, part of a national park where the species is afforded a level of protection.
