= Beaucarnea purpusii =

Conservation status
- Endangered (IUCN 3.1)
- CITES Appendix II (CITES)

Scientific classification
- Kingdom: Plantae
- Clade: Tracheophytes
- Clade: Angiosperms
- Clade: Monocots
- Order: Asparagales
- Family: Asparagaceae
- Subfamily: Convallarioideae
- Genus: Beaucarnea
- Species: B. purpusii

Binomial name
- Beaucarnea purpusii Rose

Species of flowering plant

Beaucarnea purpusii is a tree in the family Asparagaceae, native to Mexico. It grows up to 8 metres (30 ft) tall.

== Distribution and habitat ==
Beaucarnea purpusii is endemic to Mexico, where it is confined to the Tehuacán-Cuicatlán Biosphere Reserve in Puebla and Oaxaca. Its habitat is in shrubland, at altitudes of 1,700–2,300 m (5,600–7,500 ft).

== Conservation ==
Beaucarnea purpusii has been assessed as endangered on the IUCN Red List. It is primarily threatened by illegal harvesting for the ornamental plant trade. It is also threatened by conversion of its habitat for agriculture and urban development. Fires in its habitat occur with increasing frequency and intensity.
