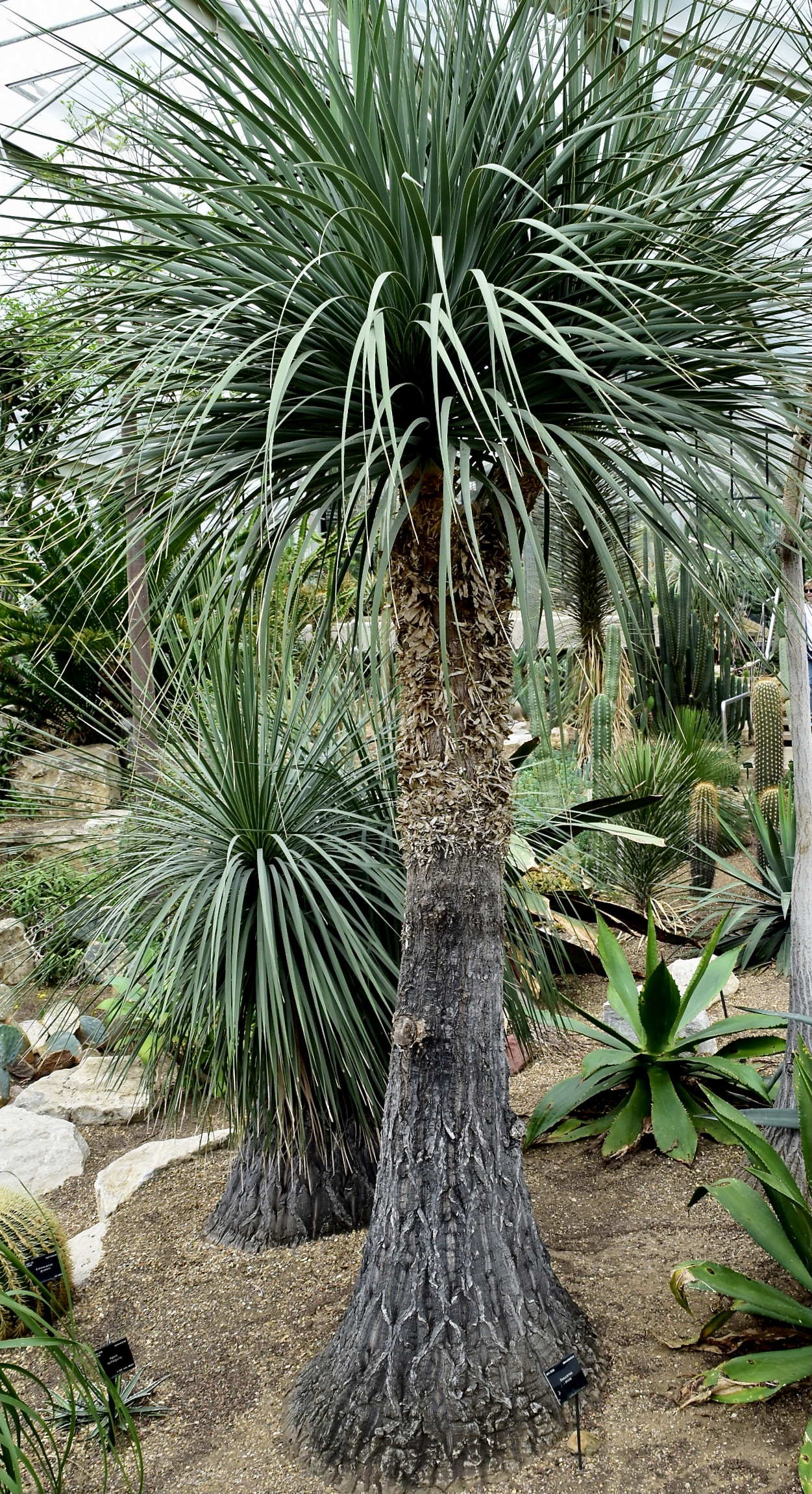
- At Royal Botanic Gardens, Kew

Conservation status
- Vulnerable (IUCN 3.1)

Scientific classification
- Kingdom: Plantae
- Clade: Tracheophytes
- Clade: Angiosperms
- Clade: Monocots
- Order: Asparagales
- Family: Asparagaceae
- Subfamily: Convallarioideae
- Genus: Beaucarnea
- Species: B. stricta

Binomial name
- Beaucarnea stricta (K.Koch & Fintelm.) Lem.

Synonyms
- Beaucarnea glauca (K.Koch & Fintelm.) Hereman; Dasylirion laxiflorum Baker; Dasylirion strictum (K.Koch & Fintelm.) J.F.Macbr.; Nolina glauca (K.Koch & Fintelm.) Mottet; Nolina stricta (K.Koch & Fintelm.) Mottet; Pincenectia glauca K.Koch & Fintelm.; Pincenectia stricta K.Koch & Fintelm.

= Beaucarnea stricta =

Species of flowering plant

Beaucarnea stricta is a tree in the family Asparagaceae, native to Mexico. The specific epithet stricta means "straight, thin", referring to the leaves.

== Description ==
Beaucarnea stricta grows up to 10 metres (30 ft) tall. The stem widens to a large, circular base. The leaves are long, straight and thin.

== Distribution and habitat ==
Beaucarnea stricta is endemic to Mexico, where it is confined to Oaxaca. Its habitat is in dry forests and shrublands, at altitudes of 800–2,000 m (2,600–6,600 ft).

== Conservation ==
Beaucarnea stricta has been assessed as vulnerable on the IUCN Red List. It is threatened by conversion of its habitat for agriculture. It is also threatened by illegal harvesting for the ornamental plant trade. The species' range includes the Tehuacán-Cuicatlán Biosphere Reserve.
