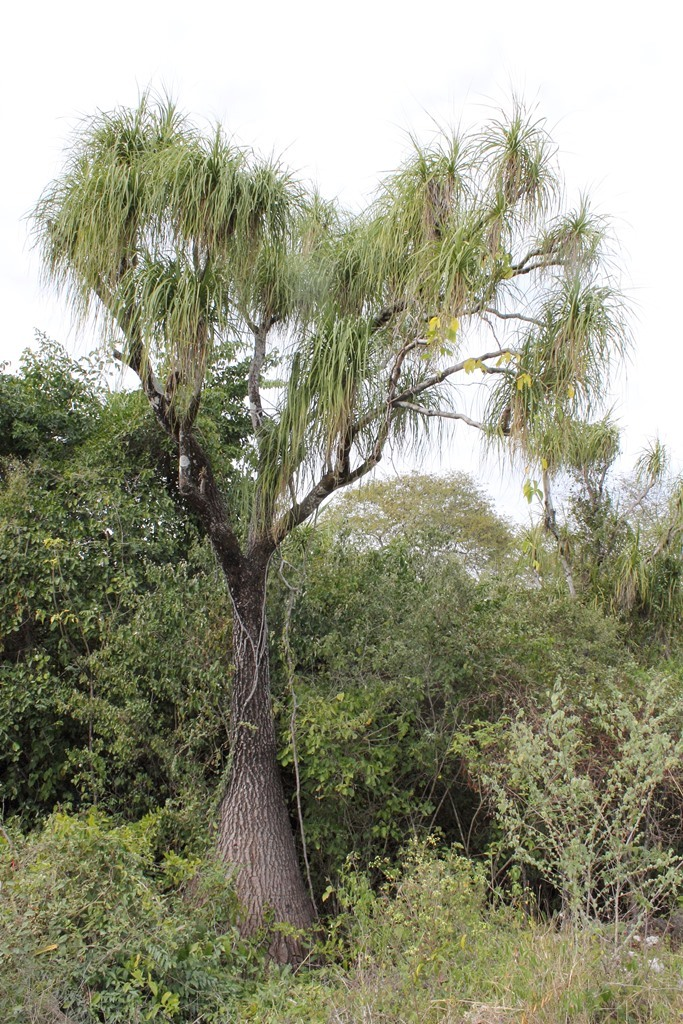
- Beaucarnea recurvata in Ocampo, Tamaulipas, Mexico

Conservation status
- Critically Endangered (IUCN 3.1)
- CITES Appendix II

Scientific classification
- Kingdom: Plantae
- Clade: Embryophytes
- Clade: Tracheophytes
- Clade: Spermatophytes
- Clade: Angiosperms
- Clade: Monocots
- Order: Asparagales
- Family: Asparagaceae
- Subfamily: Convallarioideae
- Genus: Beaucarnea
- Species: B. recurvata

Binomial name
- Beaucarnea recurvata (K.Koch & Fintelm.) Lem.

Synonyms
- Beaucarnea inermis (S.Watson) Rose; Beaucarnea tuberculata Roezl; Dasylirion inerme S.Watson; Dasylirion inermis S.Watson; Dasylirion recurvatum (Lem.) J.F.Macbr.; Nolina recurvata (Lem.) Hemsl.; Pincenectitia tuberculata Lem.

= Beaucarnea recurvata =

Species of tree

Beaucarnea recurvata, the elephant's foot or ponytail palm, is a species of flowering plant in the family Asparagaceae. The species is endemic to eastern Mexico; according to IUCN it is now confined to the state of Veracruz, but Plants of the World Online also cites it as occurring in Oaxaca, Puebla, San Luis Potosí, and Tamaulipas. Despite its common name, it is not closely related to the true palms (Arecaceae). It has become popular in Europe and worldwide as an ornamental plant. There are 350-year-old Beaucarneas registered in Mexico.

== Description ==
It is an evergreen perennial growing to 8 metres (26 ft) in height, with an enormously expanded caudex for storing water. This caudex can be as great as 14 m (46 ft) girth in the wild. The single palm-like stem produces terminal tufts of strap-shaped, recurved leathery leaves, sometimes hair lock-shaped in the ends, and with occasional panicles of small white flowers once the plant reaches over 10 years of age.

The trunk is swollen at the base and slender higher up; young plants are unbranched, but become well branched with age. The almost spherical caudex in the youth stage later becomes broadly conic and very wide at the base. The bark is smooth or finely cracked. The leaves are green, linear, slightly recurved and bent, thin, flat or slightly ridged. They are up to 180 cm (71 in) long and up to 2 cm (0.79 in) wide. The flowers are creamy-white, 1.5 mm diameter, produced in a dense panicle 90–112 cm (35–44 in) tall.

== Habitat ==
Beaucarnea recurvata occurs over an altitudinal range of 200 to 900 m (660 to 2,950 ft) above sea level. It grows on rocky soils deficient in nutrients, cliffs and steep mountains, where it grows in full sun or partial shade. Its habitat is low deciduous forest, with average temperatures of 20 °C (68 °F) and an annual rainfall of 800 mm (31 in), and a well-marked dry season of between 7 and 8 months. The plants are very slow growing and very tolerant to drought.

== Conservation ==
The species of the genus Beaucarnea are mostly in critical condition due to various anthropogenic activities, which has led to severe fragmentation and destruction of their habitat. Additionally, the collection of seeds, seedlings, juveniles and adults for commercial use has affected population size and the proportion of sexes, thereby reducing fertilization possibilities and, consequently, seed production. This exploitation process exposes this species, in a state of threat or extinction, by reducing the minimum viable size of the populations, as well as the deterioration of their genetic diversity. Beaucarnea recurvata, is considered to be threatened according to Official Mexican Standard 059-ECOL-2010 of SEMARNAT in Mexico.

The species is listed in Appendix II of the Convention on International Trade in Endangered Species (CITES) meaning international trade in the species and its parts/derivatives is regulated by the CITES permitting system.

== Cultivation ==
Having gained the Royal Horticultural Society's Award of Garden Merit, B. recurvata is often grown as a houseplant, or an outdoor plant in subtropical climate gardens. Slow-growing and drought-tolerant, Beaucarnea recurvata is hardy to 10 °C (50 °F), grows in full sun to light shade, and requires proper soil mix to drain when watered. Overwatering fosters pests such as the mealybug and cochineal insects. If kept in regions with winter frost, it must be an indoor plant as it cannot withstand cold temperatures. To maintain its original shape, the ends of its leaves should not be snipped, and when repotted it must keep all of its roots.

== Toxicity ==
The species is not toxic to dogs, cats or horses.

== Gallery ==
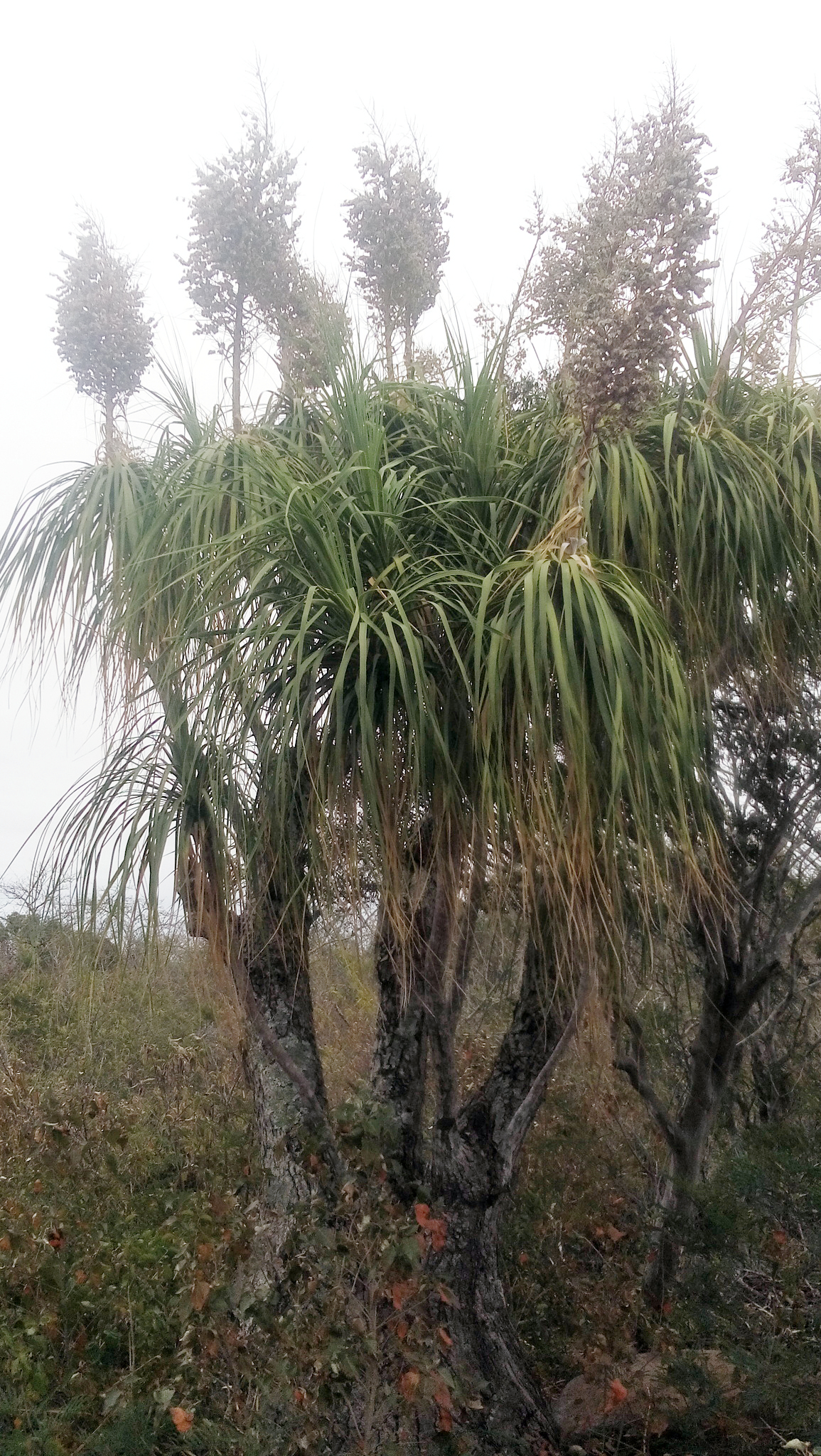
In flower, Llera de Canales, Tamaulipas

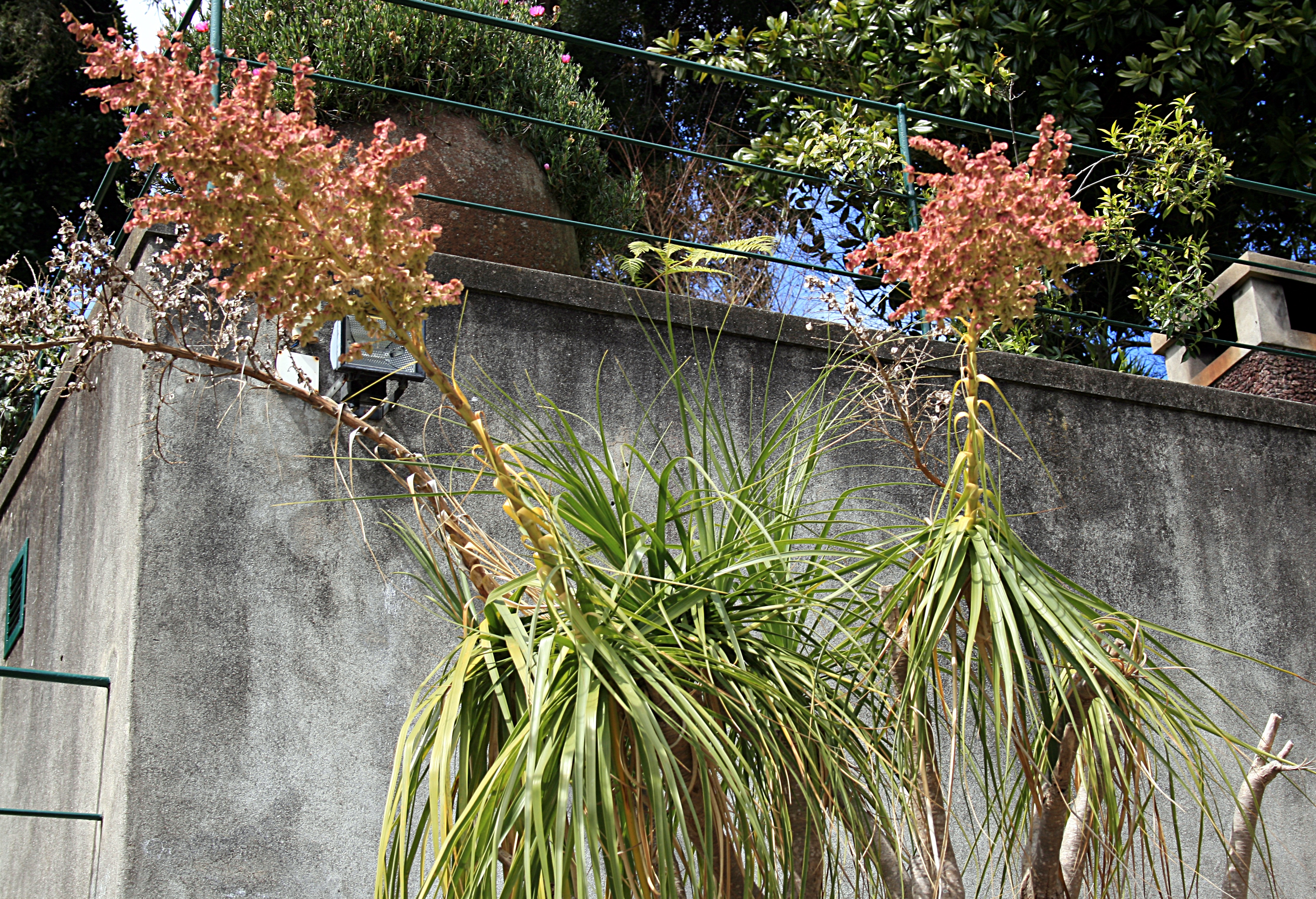
Cultivated, Funchal, Madeira island

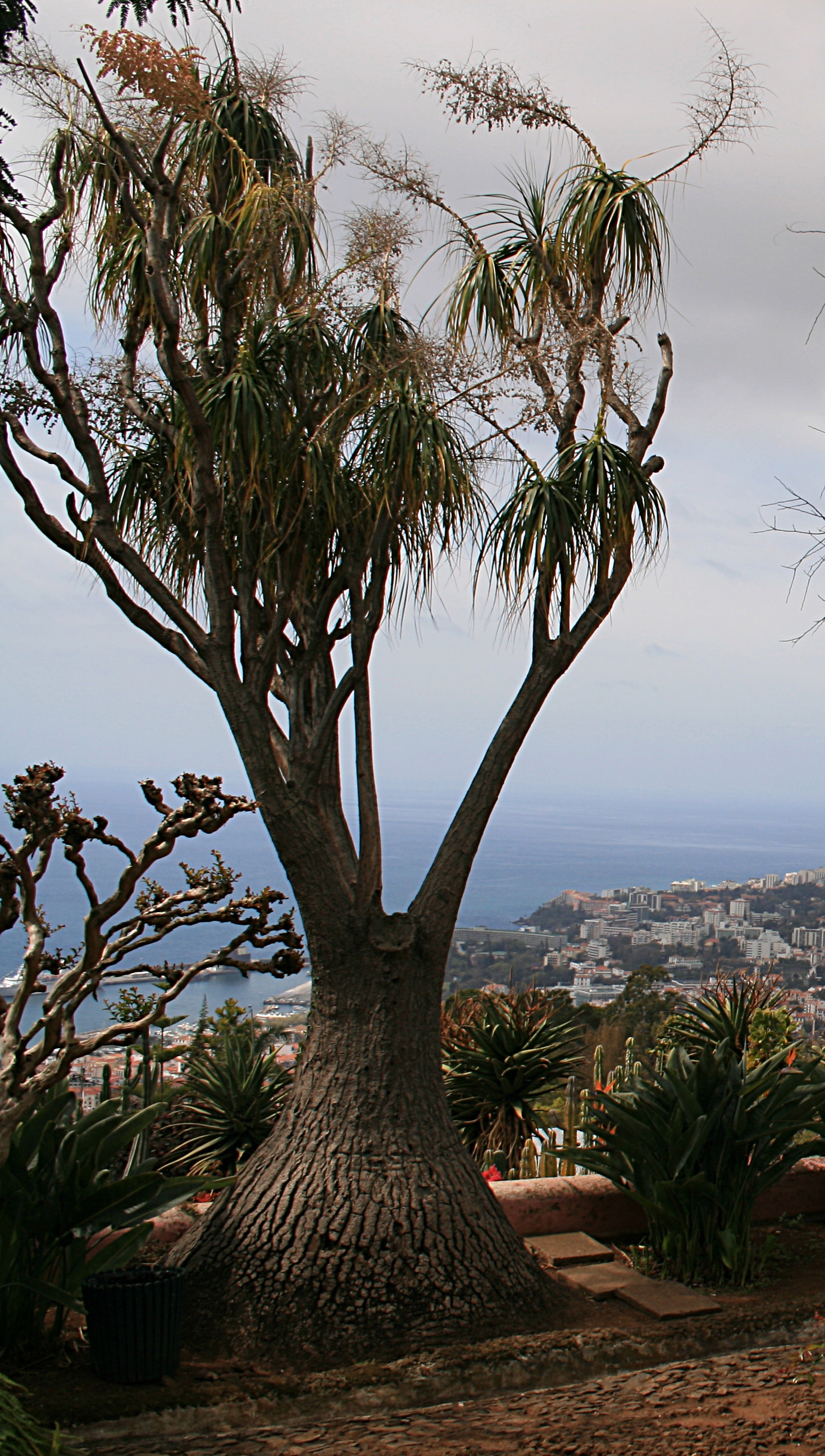
Cultivated, Madeira garden

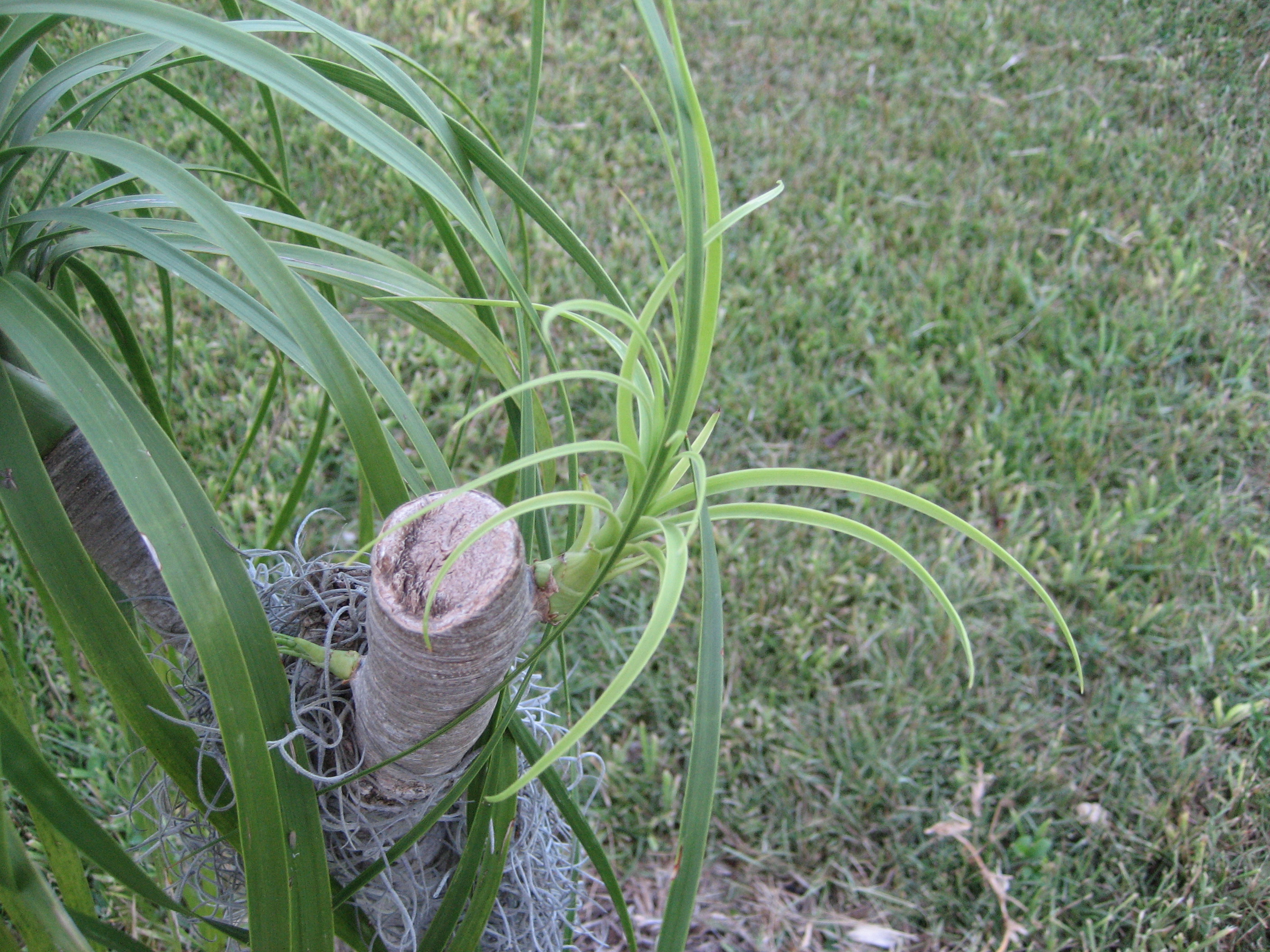
Regrowth after a crown breakage on a cultivated plant in Homestead, Florida

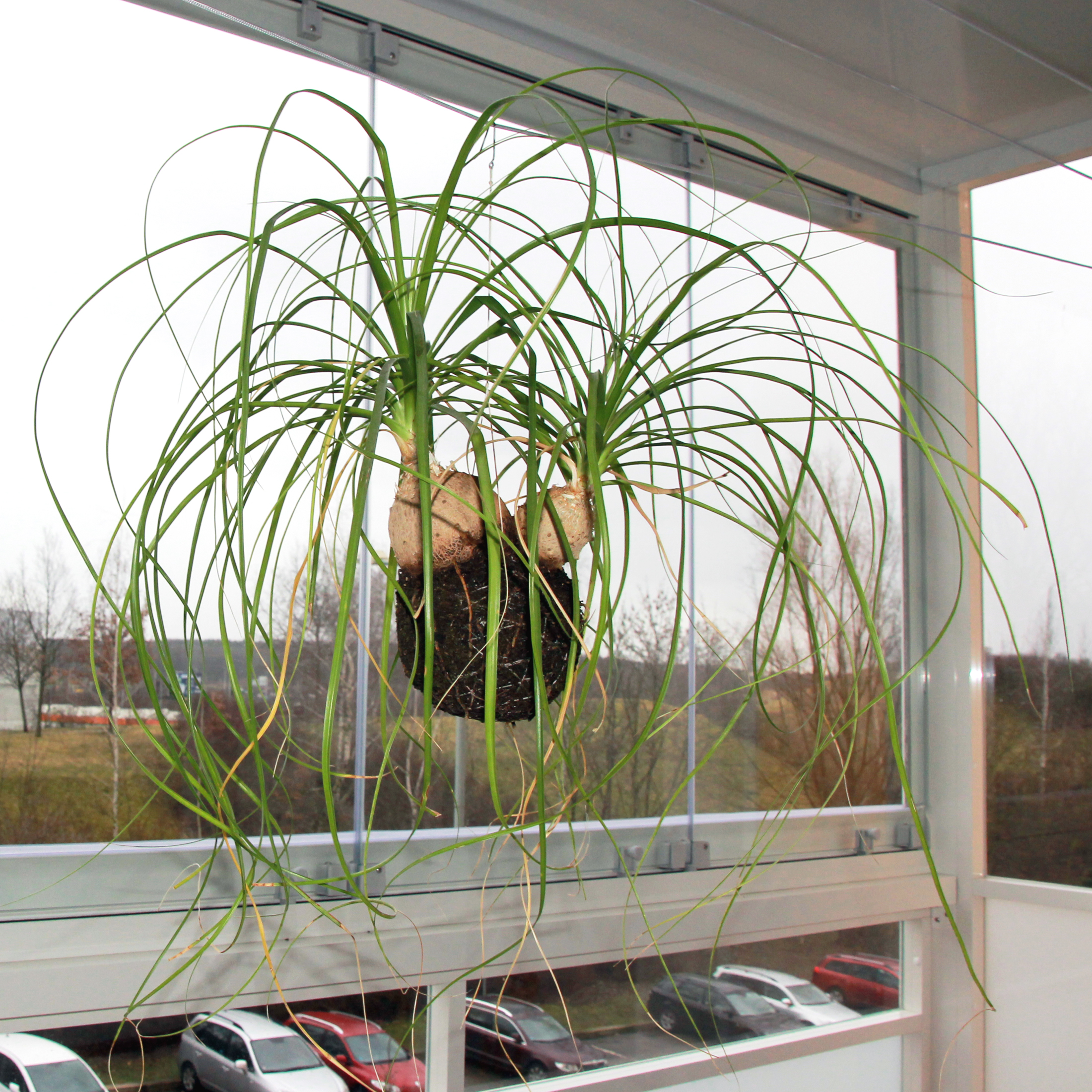
As kokedama in a city flat in Prague, Czech Republic

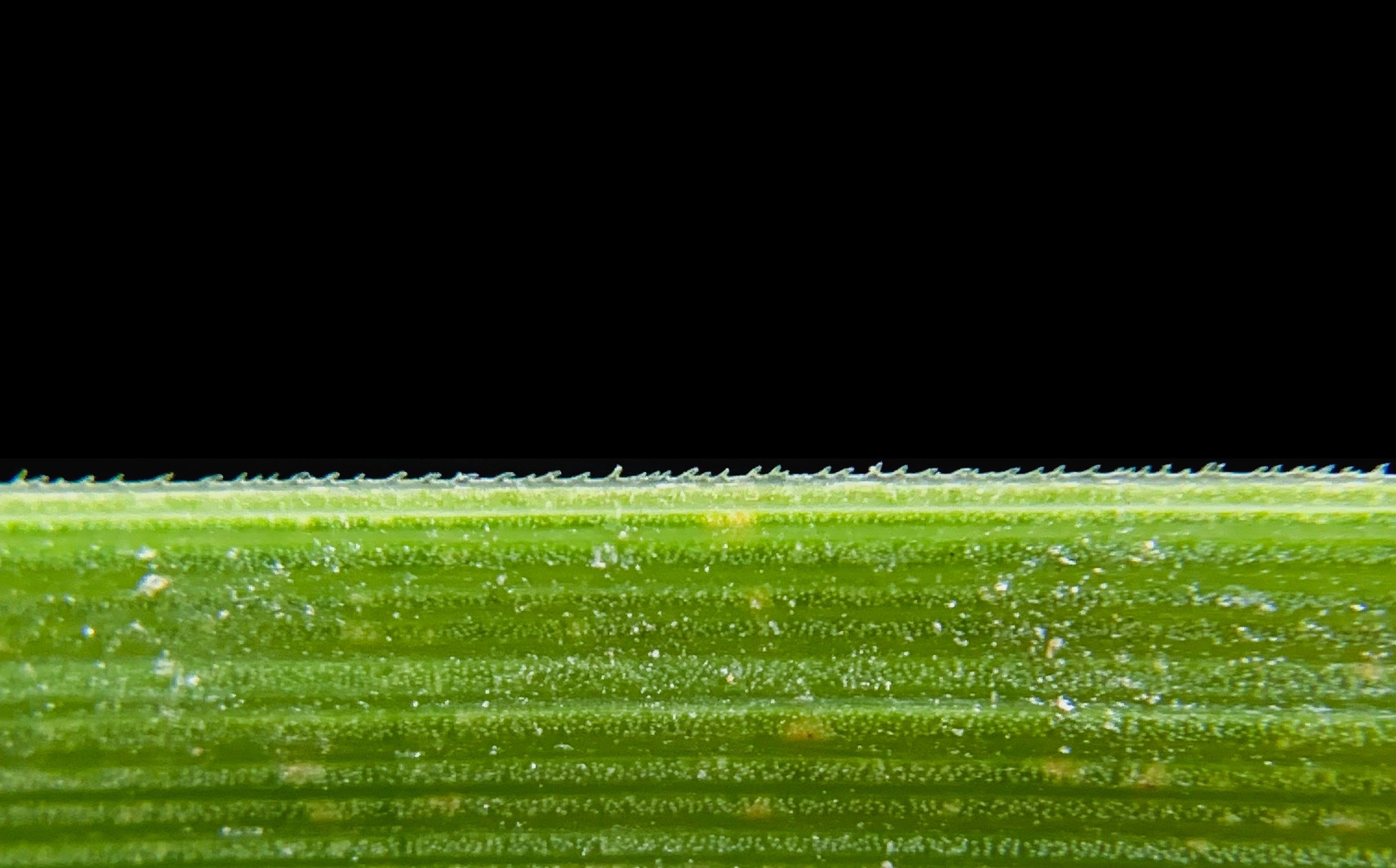
Macro image of the serrated margin of a leaf from a 7-year-old potted plant.
