= Beaucarnea glassiana =

Scientific classification
- Kingdom: Plantae
- Clade: Tracheophytes
- Clade: Angiosperms
- Clade: Monocots
- Order: Asparagales
- Family: Asparagaceae
- Subfamily: Convallarioideae
- Genus: Beaucarnea
- Species: B. glassiana

Binomial name
- Beaucarnea glassiana (L.Hern. & Zamudio) V.Rojas-Piña;

Species of flowering plant

Beaucarnea glassiana is a species of flowering plant belonging to the genus Beaucarnea, which is a member of the Asparagaceae family. Beaucarnea glassiana forms a caudex geophyte and is native to the Mexican state of Guanajuato where it grows in areas of tropical deciduous forest and submontane central Mexican matorral in the Sierra Madre Oriental near Xichú.

Beaucarnea glassiana was originally named Calibanus glassianus, and along with Beaucarnea hookeri (previously Calibanus hookeri), these were the only two species that made up the genus Calibanus. Both species were moved to the genus Beaucarnea after molecular (phylogenetic) and morphological evidence demonstrated that both species have a very closely relationship to those contained in the genus Beaucarnea, leaving Calibanus as a now defunct genus.
