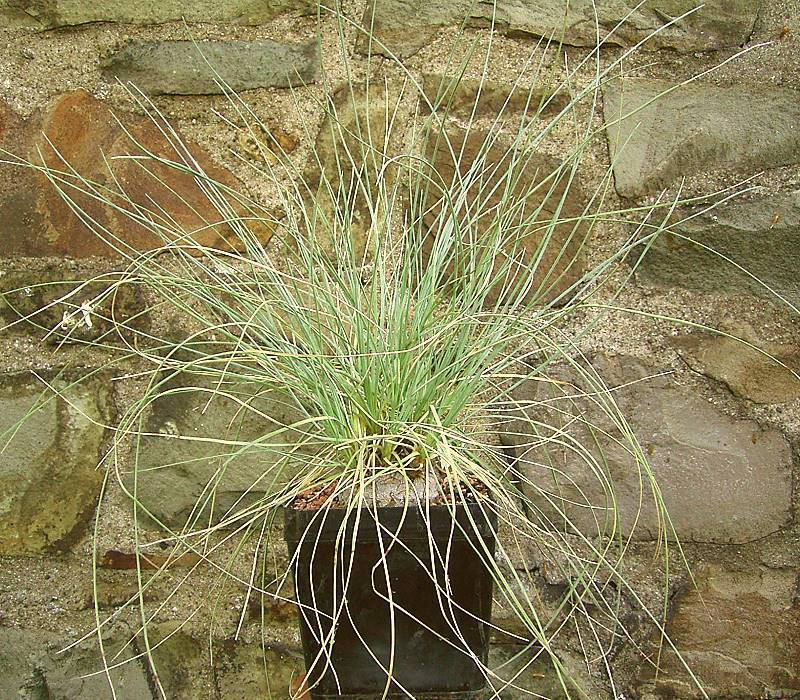

Scientific classification
- Kingdom: Plantae
- Clade: Tracheophytes
- Clade: Angiosperms
- Clade: Monocots
- Order: Asparagales
- Family: Asparagaceae
- Genus: Calibanus
- Species: C. hookeri

Binomial name
- Calibanus hookeri Trel.

Synonyms
- Beaucarnea hookeri (Lem.) Baker; Calibanus caespitosus (Scheidw.) Rose; Dasylirion caespitosum Scheidw.; Dasylirion flexile K.Koch; Dasylirion hartwegianum Hook. nom. illeg.; Dasylirion hookeri Lem.; Nolina hookeri (Lem.) G.D.Rowley

= Calibanus hookeri =

Mexican boulder

Species of flowering plant

One of only two species in its genus, Calibanus hookeri is a member of the family Asparagaceae native to Tamaulipas in Mexico, which can easily be mistaken in the wild for a boulder overgrown with grass tufts.

== Description ==
Calibanus hookeri forms a large caudex which has been known to reach diameters and heights of up to 2.6 feet. Atop the caudex sprouts extremely narrow greyish-green leaves that look like grass. Each leaf rosette grown from the caudex is believed to be a vegetatively produced independent plant which dies after fruiting to be replaced by a new one. Flower stalks grow to 2–3.3 feet tall with many branchings and bear tiny, greenish white flowers.

== Cultivation ==
Calibanus hookeri likes full sunlight and well drained and fertilized soils. Should be grown in a large and shallow container and should be kept outside in summer.

== Gallery ==
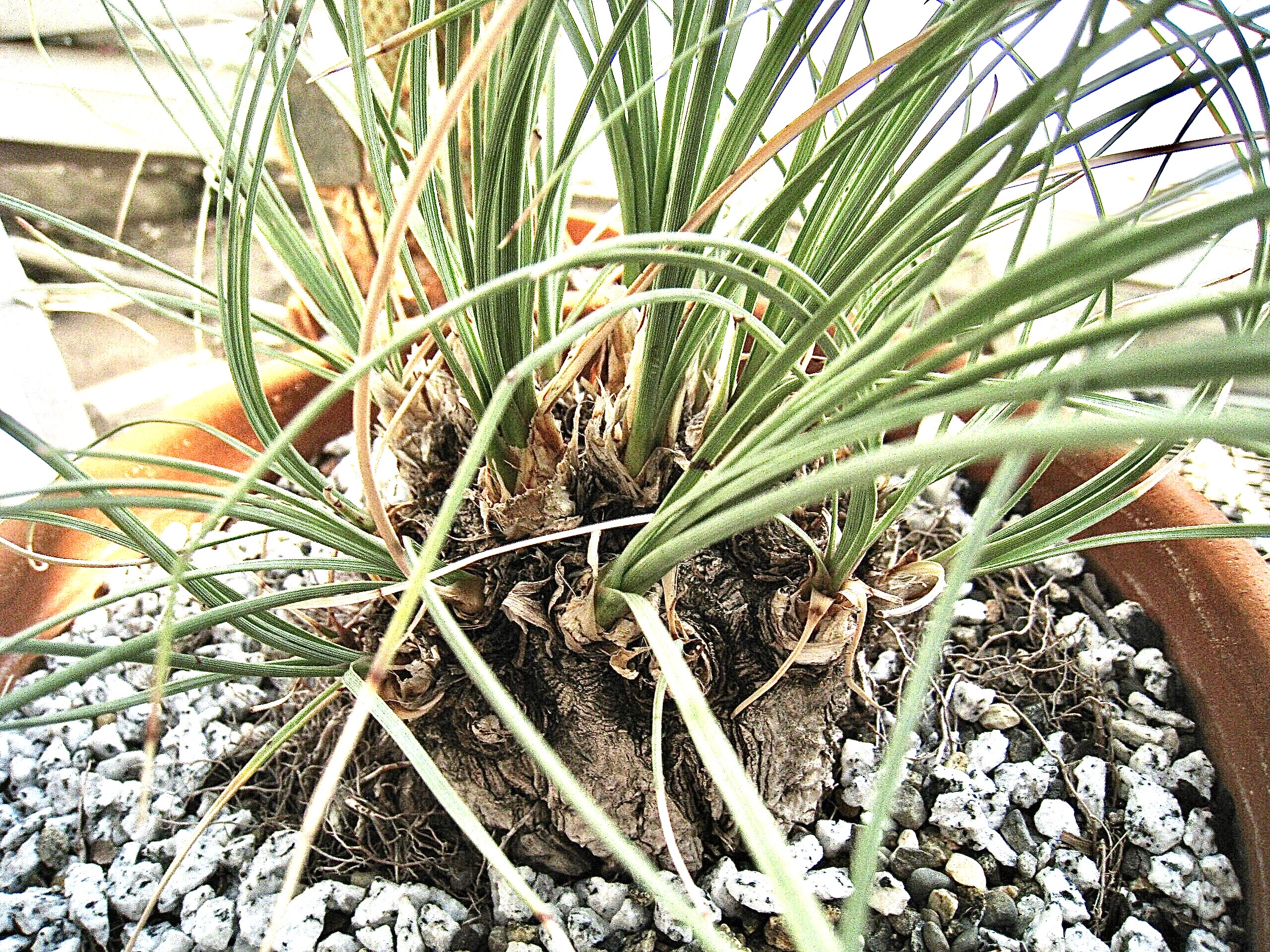
Closeup of leaves and caudex of Calibanus hookeri

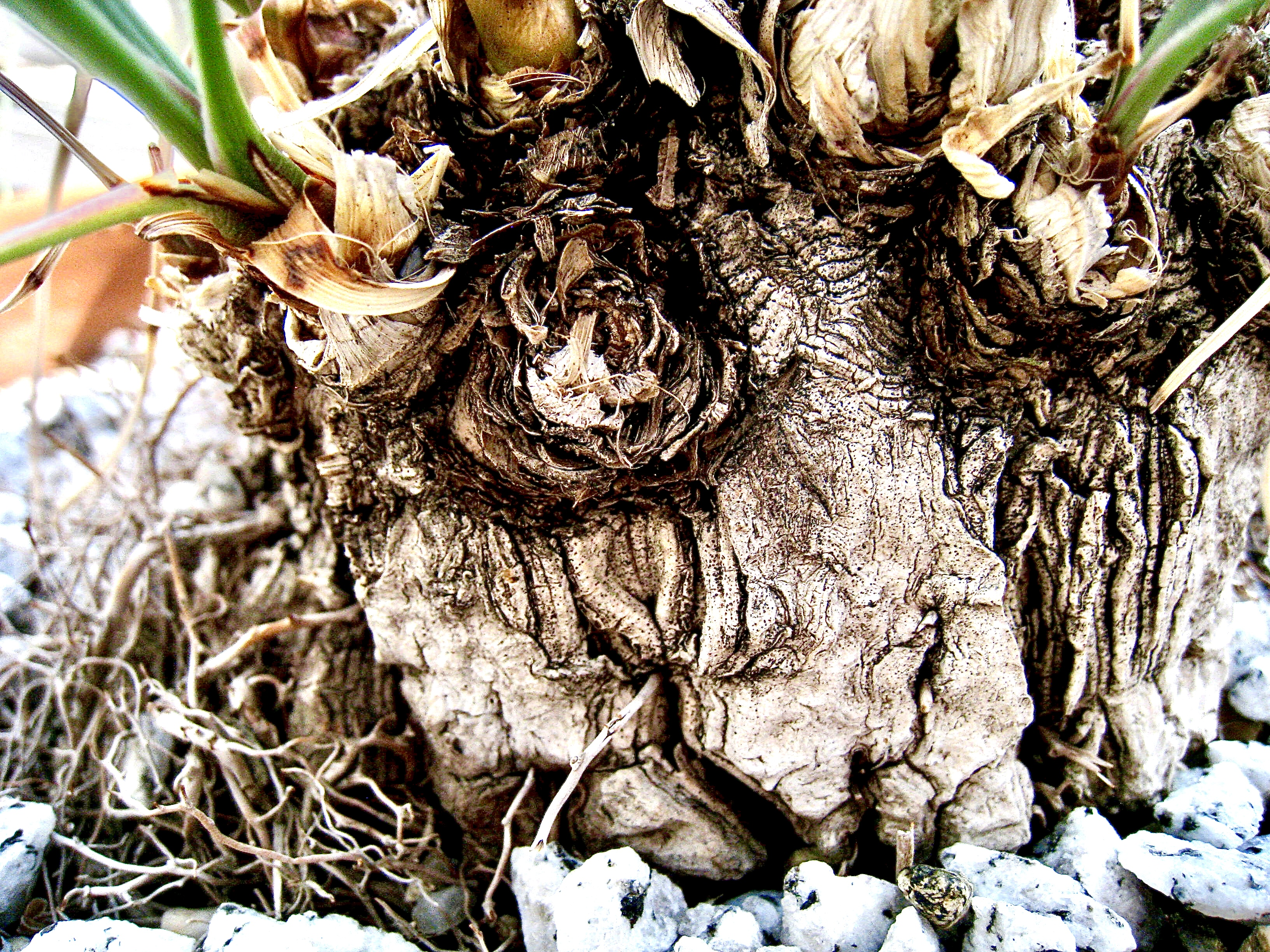
Detail of corky bark of caudex of Calibanus hookeri
