= Lullingstone railway station =

Unopened railway station in Sevenoaks, Kent, England

Lullingstone
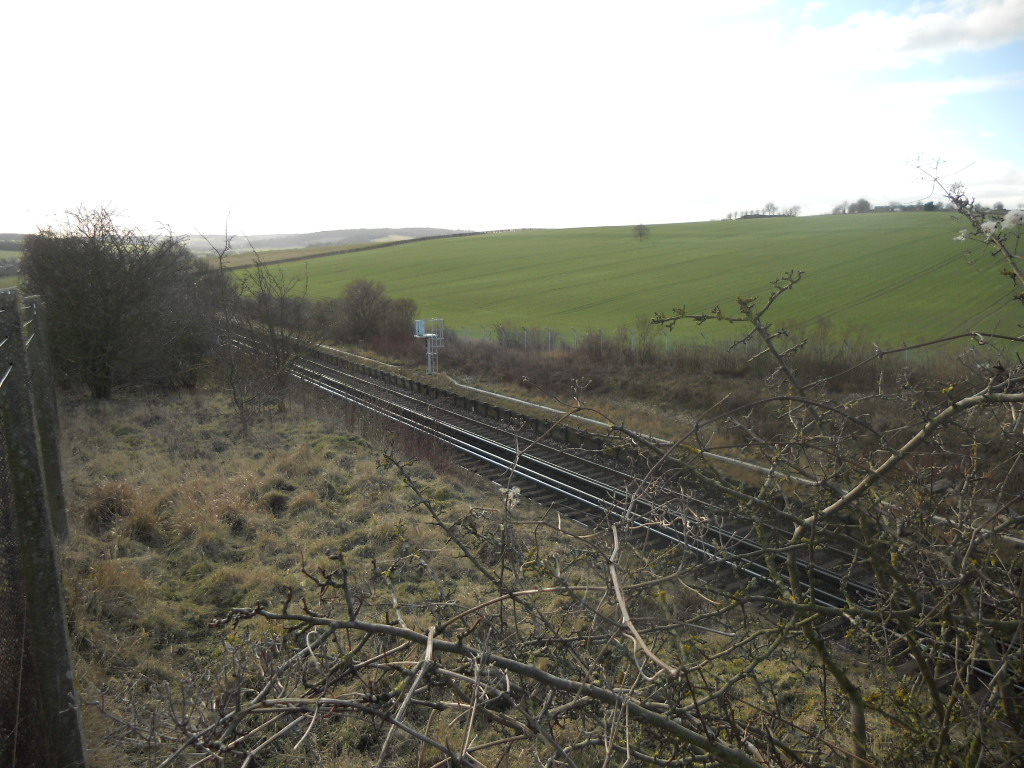
- Platform remains in January 2012.

General information
- Location: Lullingstone, District of Sevenoaks; England
- Coordinates: 51.3753°N 0.1973°E
- Grid reference: TQ530664
- Platforms: 4 planned (2 built)

Other information
- Status: Disused

History
- Original company: Southern Railway

Key dates
- 2 April 1939: Intended opening
Location

Lullingstone railway station is an unopened stop on the Maidstone line. The station, which was built in the 1930s, was constructed to serve the proposed Lullingstone Airfield and an expected residential development at Lullingstone near Eynsford in Kent. It never opened to passengers because of the outbreak World War II in 1939 and the post-war Town and Country Planning Act 1947 putting an end to urbanisation of the area.

The station buildings were demolished in 1955, although the access road and foundations remain visible.

== History ==
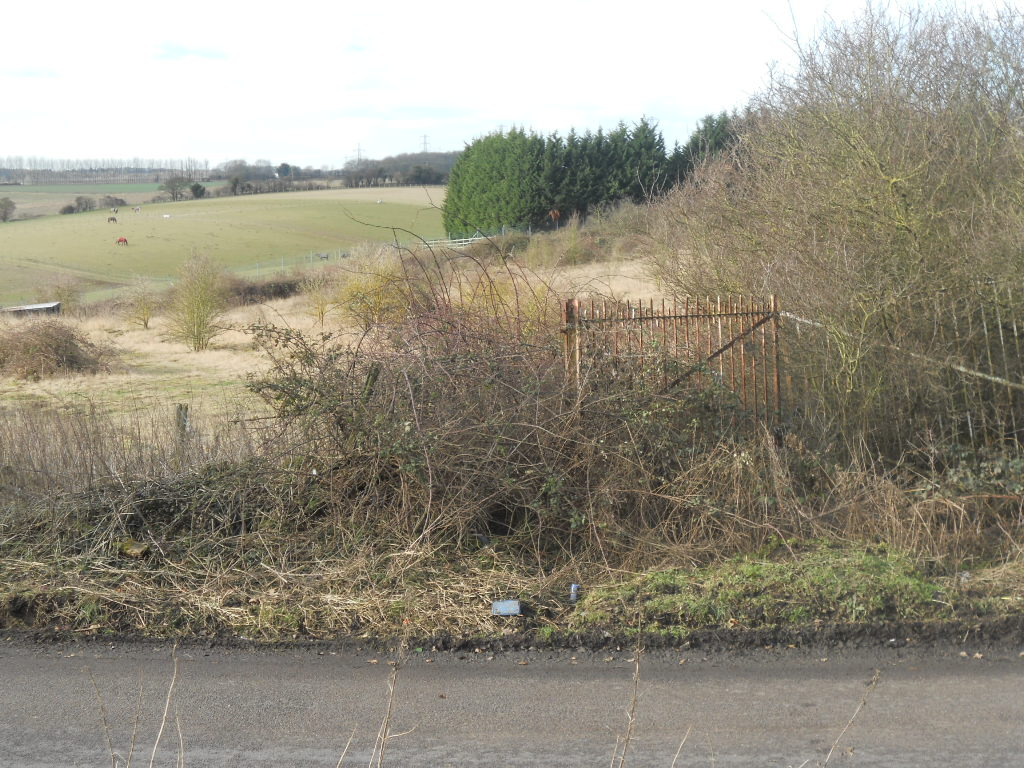
Station entrance in January 2012.

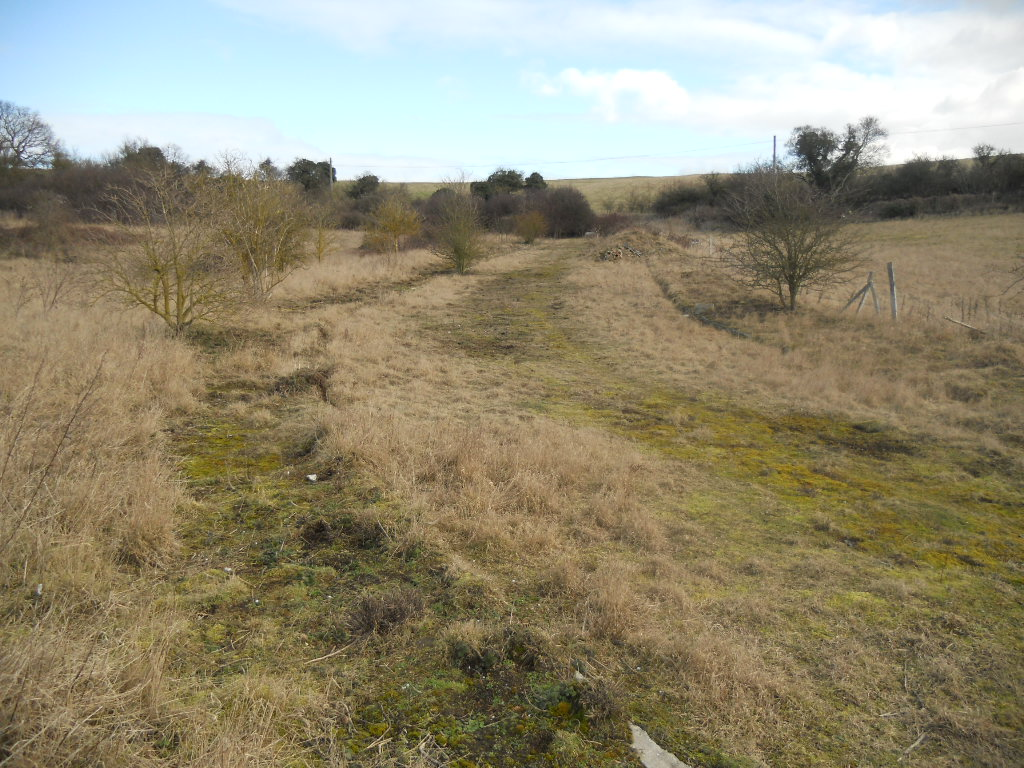
Remains of access road in January 2012.

During the 1920s and 1930s, London's suburbs expanded rapidly, leading to a period of unprecedented housebuilding. As new sites for development were sought out, so the Kemp Town Brewery Co. purchased a 5,000-acre estate near the rural community of Lullingstone in Kent. At the same time, the British government had been studying the future of air transport and airports in the London area and had decided that London would be served by four airports: the existing sites at Croydon and Heston, together with new airports at Fairlop and Lullingstone.

In August 1936, it was reported in the Kentish Times that the Southern Railway were proposing to establish Lullingstone Airfield which would be used by Imperial Airways. The airport would be served by a new station on the Maidstone East Line, electrified between Swanley and Sevenoaks in 1935, which would be situated 19 miles 39 chains (31.4 km) from London Victoria. Although the proposal was abandoned by the Southern Railway, it was taken up by the Air Ministry which saw Lullingstone as the most suitable site for a fourth aerodrome to serve London. In March 1938, the Southern Railway announced its intention not to proceed with the airport.

Plans had been drawn up by the Southern Railway for a substantial four-platform station situated immediately to the south of the 828-yard (757 m) Eynsford Tunnel. Two platforms would serve the main line, with two others on a new branch line curving away to the west to reach the proposed airport. The layout, which was nearly identical to Swanley Junction, meant that only trains travelling south could access the airport branch. A footbridge would span the four platforms and also lead to a booking office and passenger facilities located above the platforms. The official opening date of the station was scheduled for 2 April 1939.

By early 1939, the main line platforms and their ferro-concrete station buildings had been completed as well as steps leading up to a footbridge which would span the platforms. The local authority, Dartford Rural District Council, objected to the name of the station because it was not in Lullingstone parish. Further work ceased upon the outbreak of World War II, although the station was shown, unserved, in public timetables. It was shown in Bradshaw's Guide between July 1939 and June 1941 as served by trains, but with a note that the opening date would be announced. From January 1942, the trains and note were removed but the station was still shown.

As a result of the war and the failure of the airport to materialise, Lullingstone station was never brought into use and gradually became derelict. The introduction of the post-war Green Belt Act put a halt to any potential residential development and the incomplete station, standing in the middle of fields, was useless. It was mostly dismantled in 1955, leaving only the concrete supports for the platforms. The station canopy was removed and re-erected in 1960 at Canterbury East.

As of January 2012 substantial remains of the platforms and the abandoned concrete approach road remain.

The location of the station was shown on Ordnance Survey 1:63360 map 171 published in 1946.

== See also ==
- Northern Heights plan - the unfinished New Works Programme extension of the Northern Line to Elstree, that was never completed because of the outbreak of the Second World War.

Preceding station	Historical railways	Following station
Swanley Line and station open	Southern Railway Maidstone Line	Eynsford Line and station open
