= Crofton Roman Villa =

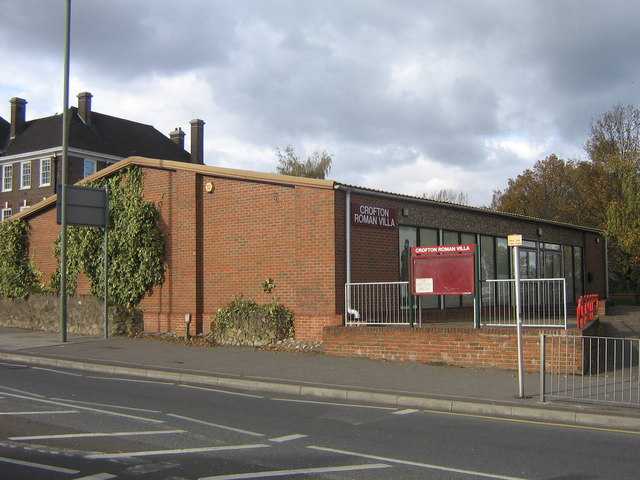
- Crofton Roman Villa, museum

- Location within Greater London

General information
- Location: Orpington grid reference TQ454658, United Kingdom
- Coordinates: 51.3729°N 0.0878°E
- Construction started: c. 140
- Demolished: c. 400

Crofton Roman Villa in Crofton, Orpington, in the London Borough of Bromley, is a Roman villa which was inhabited between approximately 140 and 400 AD. It was the centre of a farming estate of about 500 acres (200 ha), with farm buildings nearby, surrounded by fields, meadows and woods. The house was altered several times during its 260 years of occupation, and at its largest it probably had at least 20 rooms.

The remains of ten rooms can be seen today. Two rooms contain the remains of "opus signinum" floors, and three have evidence of tiled, or "tessellated", floors. Details of an underfloor central heating hypocaust can also be seen, featuring both channelled and pillared systems, as can small finds from the site.

The villa is adjacent to Orpington railway station, and is not far from Lullingstone Roman Villa, near Eynsford, Kent.

== Discovery ==
The site was discovered in 1926, when workmen were preparing a driveway for some new council offices, and unearthed some Roman artefacts. Preliminary archaeological investigations at the time established the existence of the villa, but the site was not fully investigated until 1988, when further work was carried out by the Kent Archaeological Rescue Unit (KARU). Details of their findings were published in a book in 1996. The site is protected within a modern building.

== Gallery ==
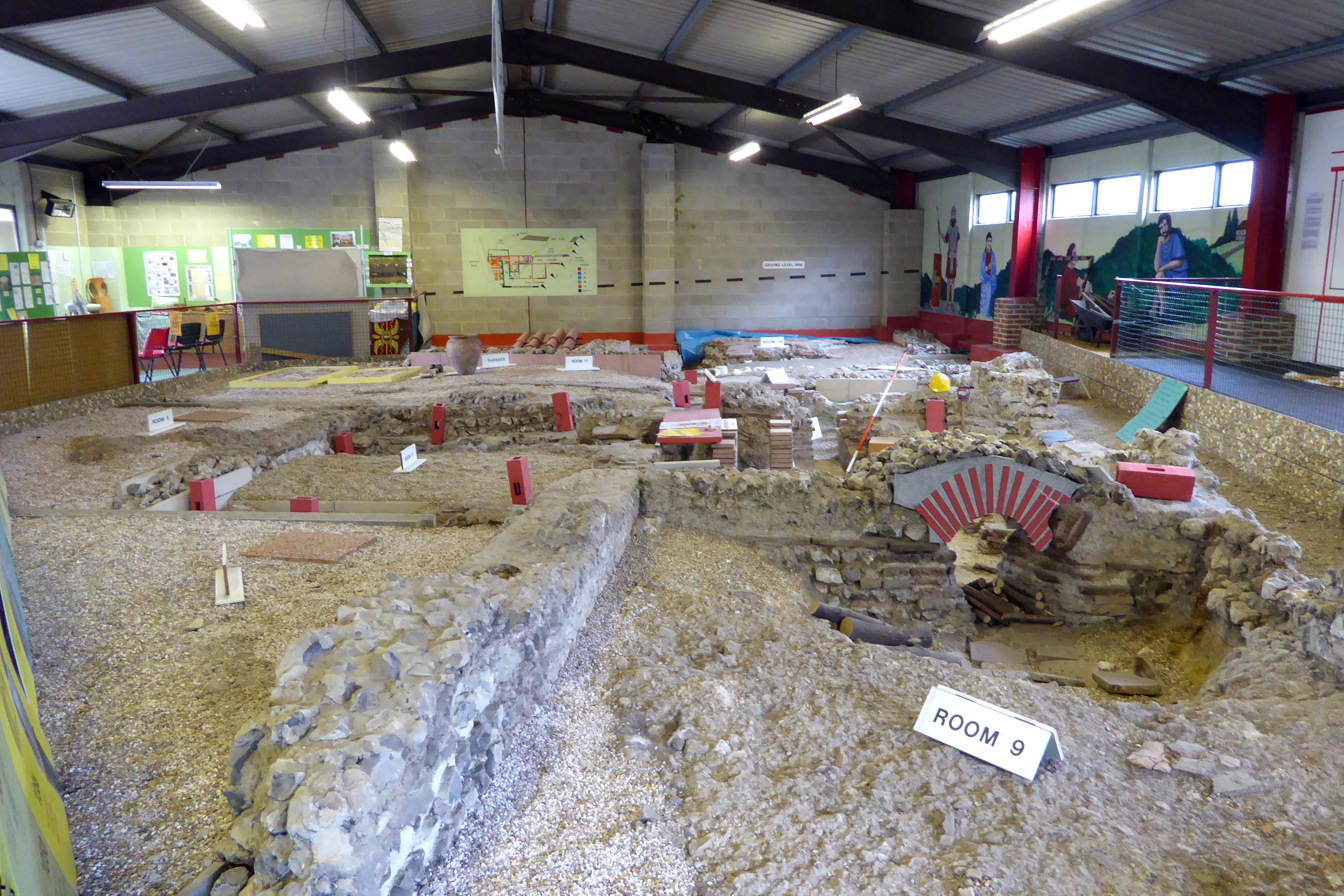

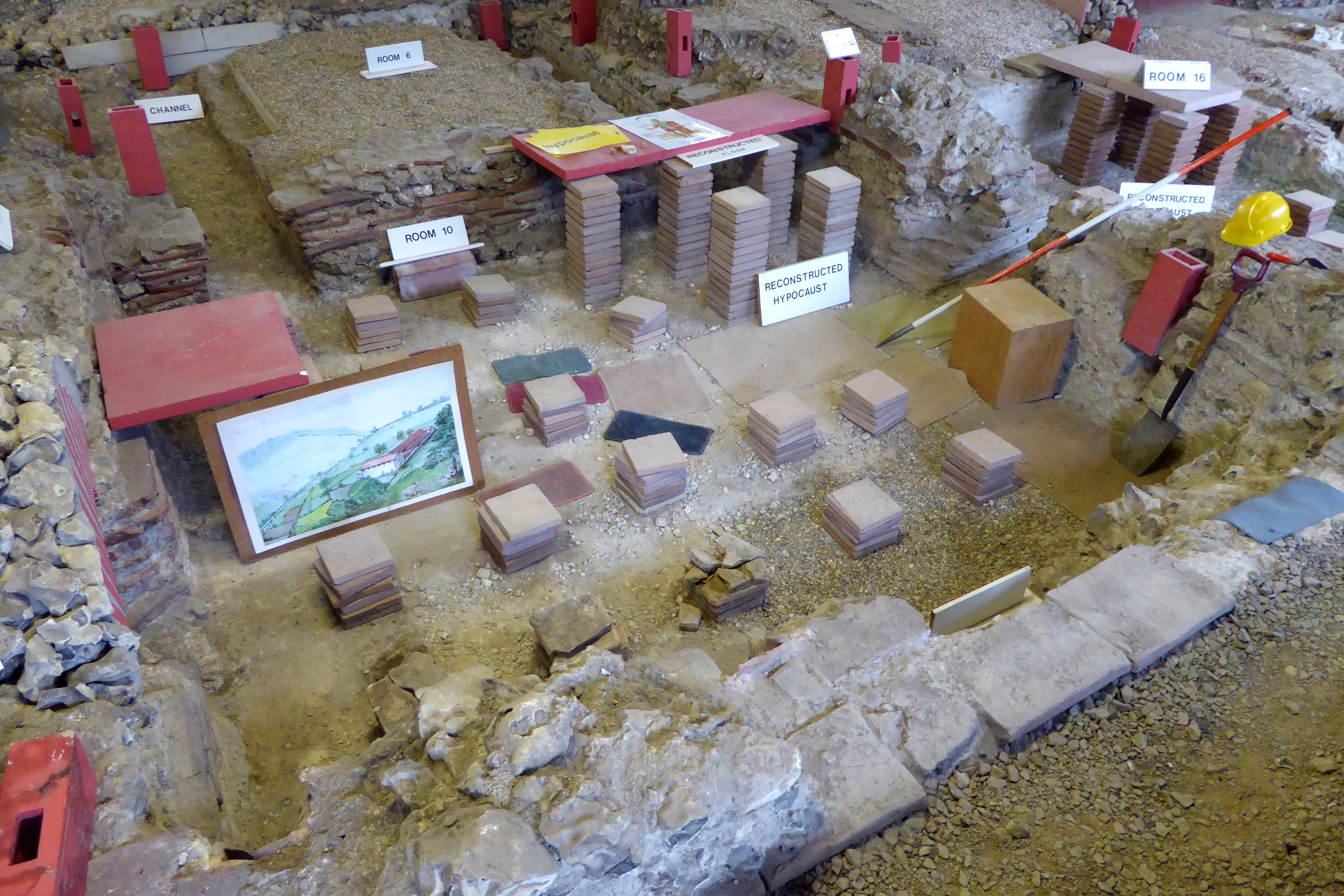
Hypocaust

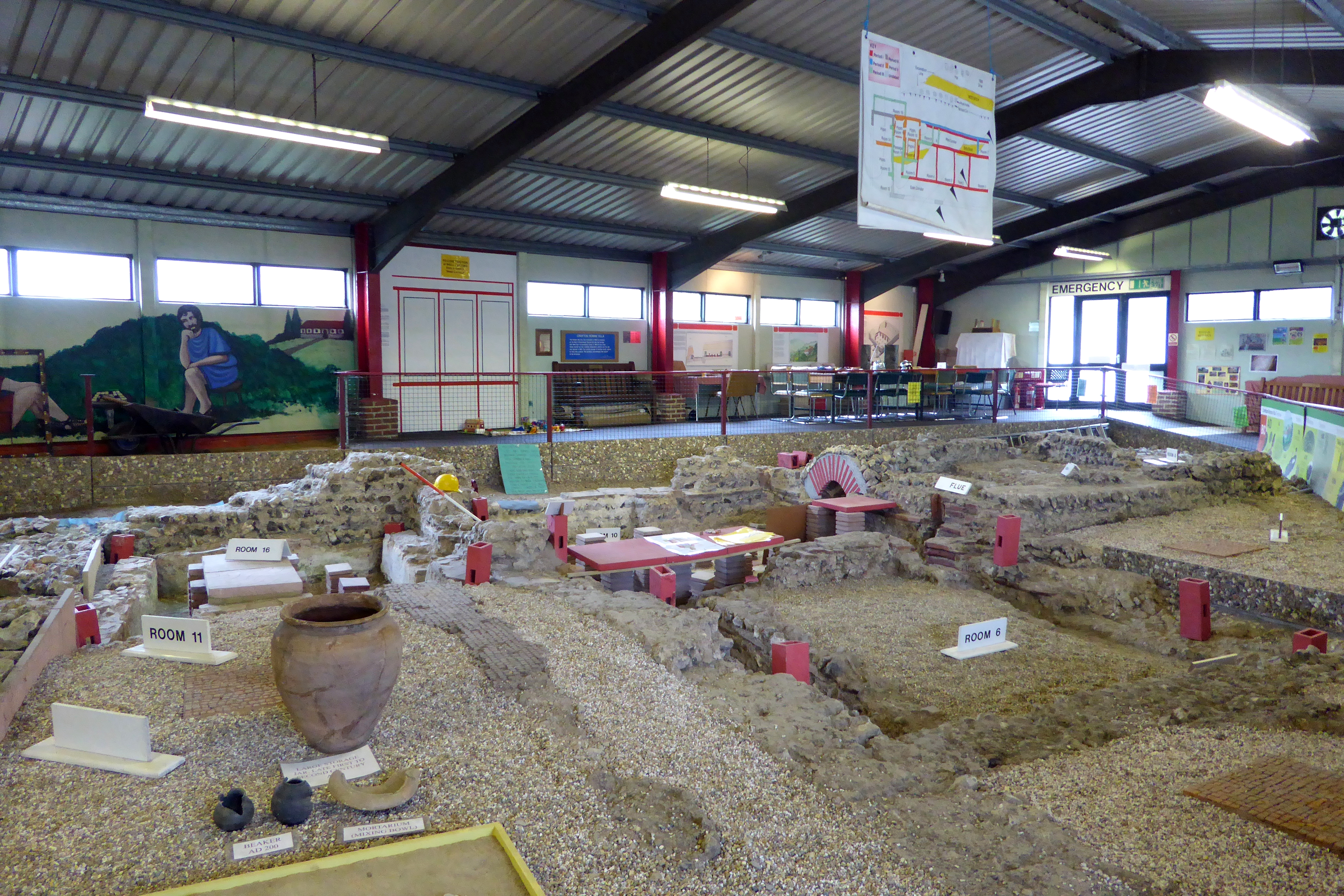

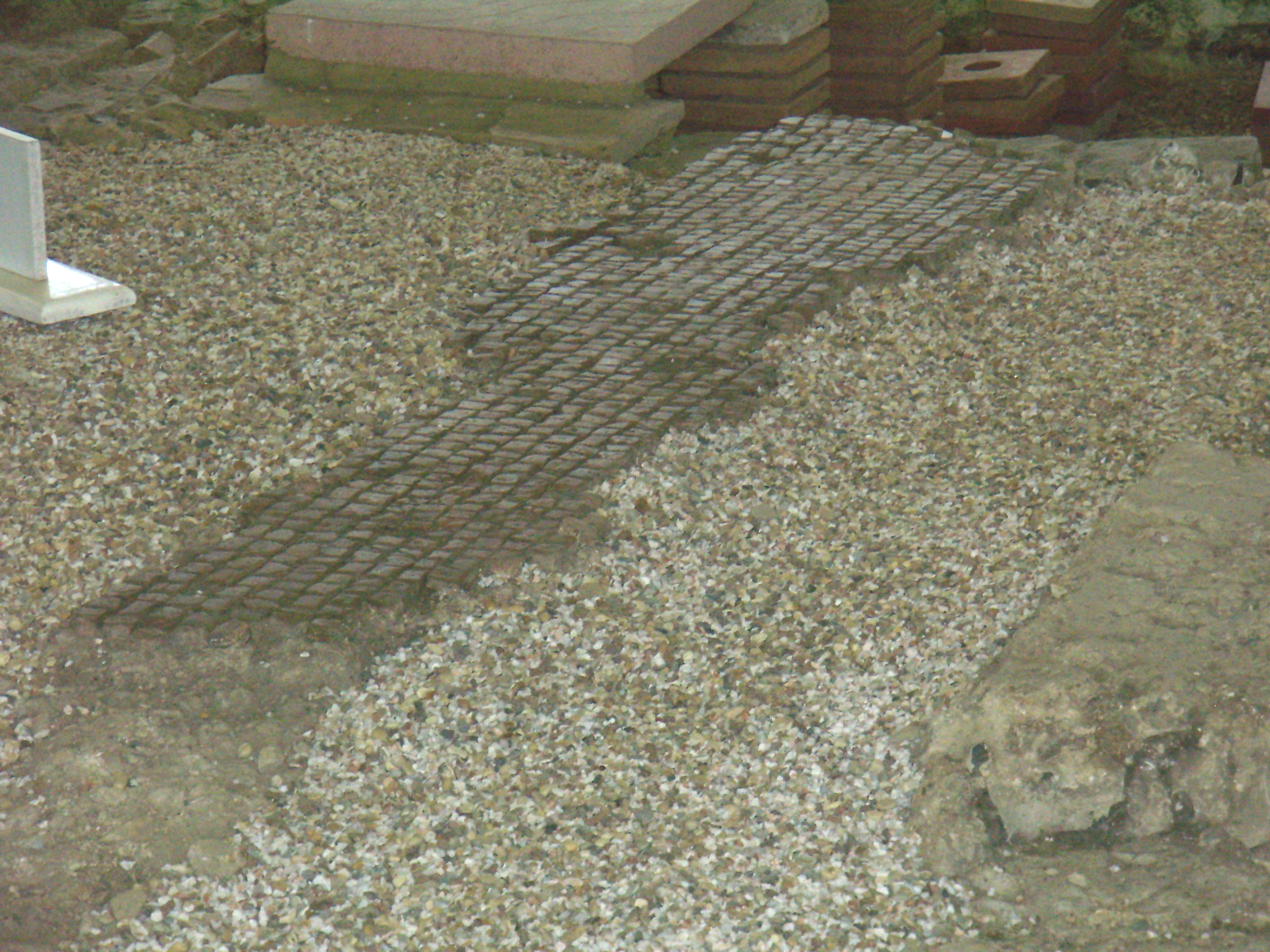
Floor

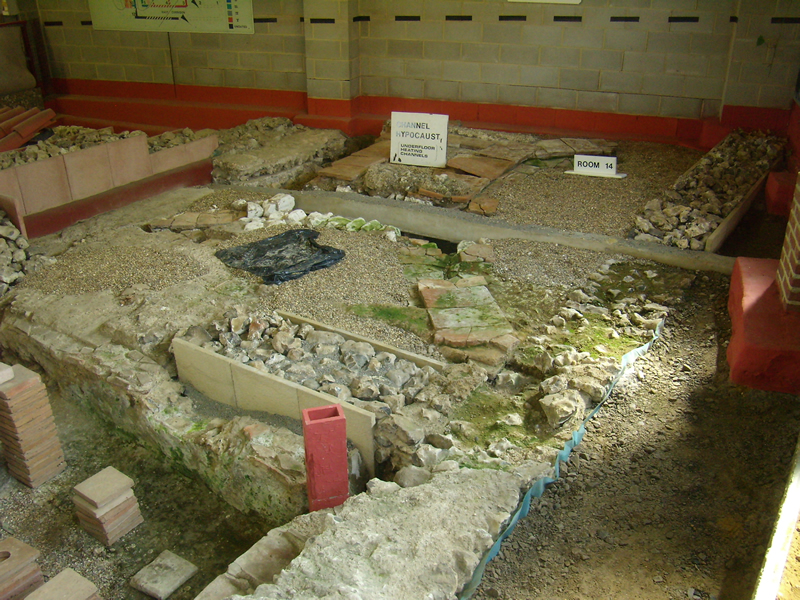
