= Darent Valley Path =

Footpath in Kent, England

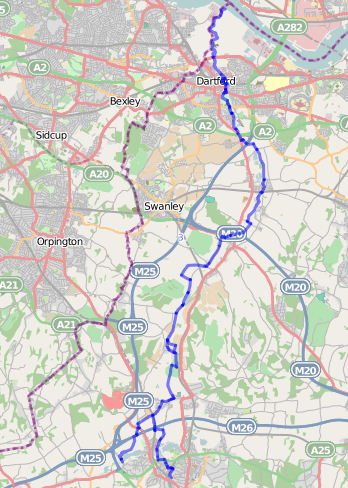
Map courtesy of OpenStreetMap

The waymarked path Darent Valley Path is 19 miles (31 km) long, following the River Darent from the banks of the River Thames at Dartford through the Kent Downs Area of Outstanding Natural Beauty to the Greensand Hills above Sevenoaks. It runs through the villages of Shoreham and Otford.

The route is well served by public transport making it ideal to break into manageable walks. Railway stations are situated at Sevenoaks, Bat & Ball, Otford, Eynsford, Farningham Road, Dunton Green and Dartford, and there are many bus routes along the route.

The route is also used by National Cycle Network Route 125, which follows the same route as the footpath.

== Route Directions ==
There are two options when starting from the Southern end of the route;

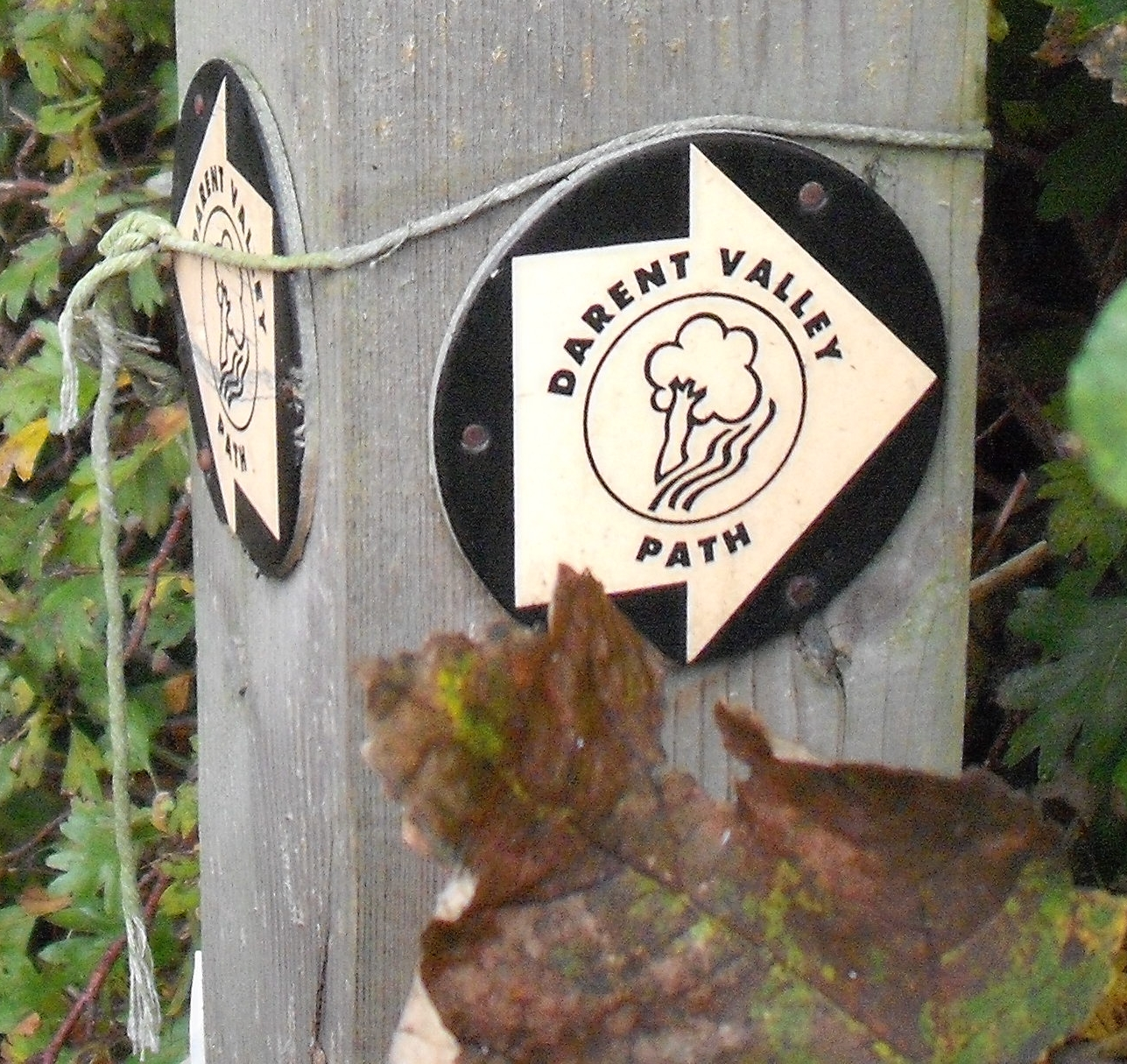

- A The Eastern arm starts close to Sevenoaks railway station in Bradbourne Park Road, and quickly enters the small parks which include Bradbourne lakes. Exit onto the A25, Bradbourne Vale Road, which must be crossed with care. The path and gate are easily missed and the wooden post bearing the Darent Valley Path sign is partially obscured at the grass field currently occupied by horses (September 2009). The route is well signposted from here to its junction with the Western arm at the railway bridge above Otford.
- B The Western arm starts opposite the Bricklayers Arms PH in Chevening Road, Chipstead Sevenoaks. An information board marks the start of the route which follows paths around Chipstead lake before cutting across country towards Dunton Green. Although the route is signposted, the signs are partially obscured by undergrowth in places and a map showing the route is recommended. After passing under the M26 the route climbs to the A224 which must be crossed near to The Rose and Crown public house, before heading North along London Road. A small path lined by a hedge and low wall next to the Donington Manor Hotel leads into the countryside, and shares its route with the North Downs Way, meeting up with the Eastern arm at the railway bridge above Otford.

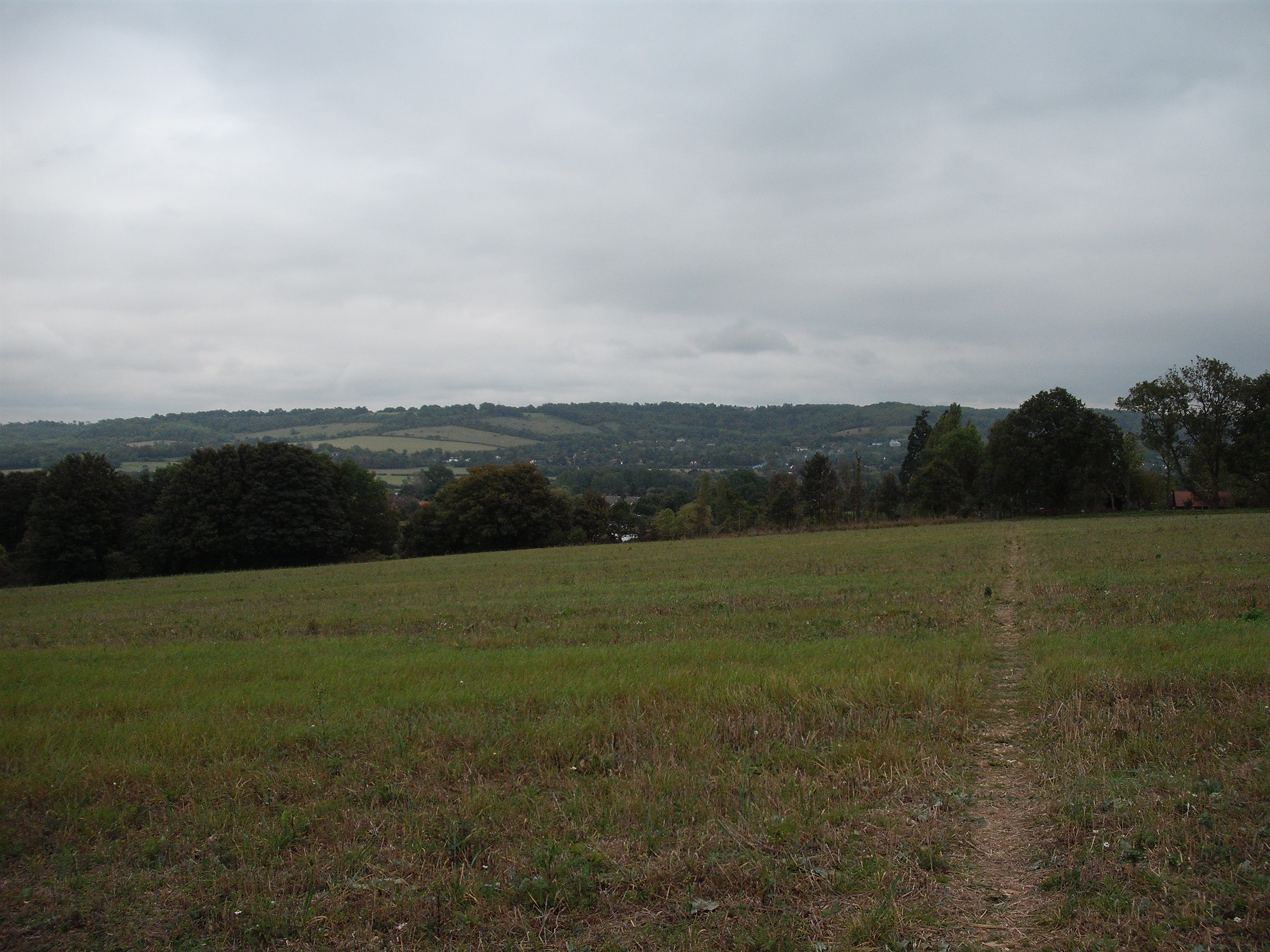
Footpath approaching the railway bridge above Otford

The route to Otford follows a small lane & estate roads, before crossing the River Darent where Pilgrims Way West becomes High Street, Otford. There are several shops and refreshment stops in Otford a short distance from the route. A private driveway immediately next to the river is the route from Otford, and this quickly changes to footpaths with stiles. Although the river is quickly lost from sight amongst trees & undergrowth, the river valley is very pretty. This well signposted section of the route passes through a golf course before entering the outskirts of Shoreham.

Shoreham provides a choice of routes, both very pretty in their own way. The route above the village which is first encountered passes close to a bench offering views across the valley, while the lower route close to the river has its own charm walking on the metaled path to the village outskirts.

Leaving Shoreham, the path follows the river closely as it heads through pleasant countryside towards Eynsford. At your next junction with a road (Redmans Lane), cross the road diagonally to your left, climb 5 or six steps, and follow the path along the field edge towards your right, which is much more pleasant & safer than the road below. At the end of the path, the route passes the rear of the Lullingstone visitor centre, which houses a small restaurant & gift shop. The nearby 'Hop shop' also supplies local produce & gifts. The path for the next mile is immediately beside the river, passing close to Lullingstone Castle & the World Garden of Plants. The small lane continues North, but your route is to the left, just prior to the Lullingstone Roman Villa.

Climbing several steps the route passes into farmland again before turning sharp right heading across the slope (keep the hedge to your left). The route passes close to Eagle Heights on your left, before crossing a small road & heading diagonally down the hill to Lullingstone Lane which is followed to the right before turning left into Sparepenny Lane. After about 100 metres a new pathway has been created parallel to the road, just to its right. Follow this path for most of the length of Sparepenny Lane, before returning to the road, turning right, and walking down the hill in Farningham to its junction with Dartford Road.

The path leaves Farningham through the rear car park of the hotel / restaurant at the junction. The path now follows the river closely for a short distance, before being separated by fences as the path passes close to horton kirby Cricket Ground. At the junction with Franks Lane turn left, then walk down the road until you cross the bridge & turn immediately right along the path next to the river. The path passes through the Westminster fields playing fields with its small toilet block, before continuing beside the river into at the corner of the field down a muddy path towards South Darenth. This can be a popular stretch for pond dipping, fishing and all around river enjoyments

Turn right into Station Road, then left at the bridges pub and under the tall Victorian viaduct via the small path alongside Horton Road, which is followed through the village. There are refreshments & a few shops available here.then at the post office near the small village green keep walking along the river past the devon road bridge and towards the old mill At the bottom of Holmesdale Hill, turn left into a small driveway which quickly becomes a footpath (make sure you take the path with the pig style on the right.) Leading across farmland make your own way across all the fields (be careful as there is a popular model aeroplane landing strip) until you get to an opening at the bottom of the field and come out near the church at bottom of Darenth Hill. Carefully cross this busy road and enter Darenth Road, opposite, which is followed to the footpath at its end. The path returns to follow the river before you are forced away and along the A225 Hawley Road for several hundred metres, to pass under the A2. Rejoin the path leading away from the road at the back of the recycle bins in the lay by, & follow the path beside the River Darent as it passes into Dartford, going close to the industrial estate before reaching Dartford. Cross Powder Mill Lane, and follow the path between the lakes and river, heading to the foot tunnel passing under the busy & dangerous Princes Road.

Princes Road marks the boundary of Central Park through which the Darent Valley Way passes, exiting beside the museum & library. Turn right at the corner of Dartford Library along the front of the museum and stay on the footpath to a Pelican crossing, turning right towards The Wat Tyler Inn where the path follows Bullace Lane to the pedestrian underpass under the Hanau Bridge bus stops. Walk up the ramp and locate the [signposted] path to the rear of offices. Proceed to the wooden bridge close to Dartford train station and pass under it (and the railway) to enter Mill Pond Road. Turn left here and, when convenient and safe, cross Mill Pond Road. In view of the gasworks, at the roundabout, is an embedded Darent Valley Path tile! Turn right into Lower Hythe Street, passing The Hufflers Arms. After 100 metres, take "Nelsons Row" pathway to the right. Signposted and marked DB10, it is maintained in passable condition by local lengthsman volunteers of "The Friends of Dartford and Crayford Creek". Nelsons Row pathway leads over the River Darent by "Nelson's Row" slipway which is used by kayakers as the only access facility on the "Esat Bank". Turn immediately left on crossing the bridge and follow the path along the east bank of the river, behind industrial estates. A specially built walkway further along places you almost directly over the river and in sight of the ruckings of Dartford Lock, as The Darent Valley Path heads into marsh land. The Path drops under the A206, before following the flood defences out to Dartford Flood Barrier where it joins the River Thames.
