= Listed buildings in Eynsford =

Historic structures in Kent, England

Eynsford is a village and civil parish in the Sevenoaks District of Kent, England. It contains three grade I, one grade II* and 51 grade II listed buildings that are recorded in the National Heritage List for England.

This list is based on the information retrieved online from Historic England.

== Key ==
Grade	Criteria
I	Buildings that are of exceptional interest
II*	Particularly important buildings of more than special interest
II	Buildings that are of special interest

== Listing ==
Name	Grade	Location	Type	Completed (Note: The date given is the date used by Historic England as significant for the initial building or that of an important part in the structure's description.)	Date designated	Grid ref. (Note: The grid reference is based on the British national grid reference system, sometimes known as OSGB36, used by the Ordnance Survey.) Geo-coordinates	Notes	Entry number (Note: The "List Entry Number" is a unique number assigned to each listed building and scheduled monument by Historic England.)	Image	Wikidata
Eynsford War Memorial	II	DA4 0AA			7 April 2017	TQ5418165606; 51°22′07″N 0°12′49″E		1444998	Eynsford War Memorial More images	Q66478680
Barn Approximately 50 Metres North of Park House	II	Bower Lane			22 October 1982	TQ5484064243; 51°21′22″N 0°13′21″E		1216674	Upload Photo	Q26511442
Bower Farmhouse	II	Bower Lane			22 October 1982	TQ5480464484; 51°21′30″N 0°13′19″E		1275801	Upload Photo	Q26565360
Park House	II	Bower Lane			22 October 1982	TQ5482564192; 51°21′21″N 0°13′20″E		1275802	Upload Photo	Q26565361
Electrical Junction Box in Front of Stacklands and Fountain Court	II	Dartford, DA4 0AB			27 March 2023	TQ5415665577; 51°22′06″N 0°12′47″E		1483152	Upload Photo	Q122214076
Bank Cottages	II	1-4, High Street			20 August 1981	TQ5451966003; 51°22′19″N 0°13′07″E		1217316	Upload Photo	Q26512045
Bee Skepps in the Garden of Underberg	II	High Street			1 June 1967	TQ5430565698; 51°22′10″N 0°12′55″E		1275535	Upload Photo	Q26565112
Bower Cottage	II	High Street			1 June 1967	TQ5419465611; 51°22′07″N 0°12′49″E		1217159	Upload Photo	Q26511891
Boyne	II	High Street			22 October 1982	TQ5418165638; 51°22′08″N 0°12′49″E		1275537	Upload Photo	Q26565114
Church of Saint Martin	I	High Street			1 June 1967	TQ5404865467; 51°22′03″N 0°12′42″E		1217157	Church of Saint Martin More images	Q17529849
Elizabeth Cottages	II	1 and 2, High Street			1 June 1967	TQ5419865637; 51°22′08″N 0°12′50″E		1217161	Upload Photo	Q26511894
Elizabeth Cottages	II	3, 4 and 5, High Street			1 August 1952	TQ5419465626; 51°22′08″N 0°12′49″E		1275571	Upload Photo	Q26683197
Eynsford House	II	High Street			22 October 1982	TQ5419165672; 51°22′09″N 0°12′49″E		1217170	Upload Photo	Q26511903
Ford House and Eynsford Post Office	II	High Street			22 October 1982	TQ5403265513; 51°22′04″N 0°12′41″E		1275536	Upload Photo	Q26565113
Gore Tree Cottage and Rowan Cottage	II	High Street			1 August 1952	TQ5428065745; 51°22′11″N 0°12′54″E		1217166	Upload Photo	Q26511899
Little Mote	II	High Street			22 October 1982	TQ5419265891; 51°22′16″N 0°12′50″E		1275538	Upload Photo	Q26565115
Parsonage House	II	High Street			22 October 1982	TQ5409265490; 51°22′03″N 0°12′44″E		1217220	Upload Photo	Q26511949
Russel Garth Russell Cottages	II	High Street			22 October 1982	TQ5418765659; 51°22′09″N 0°12′49″E		1275457	Upload Photo	Q26565041
The Mill House	II	High Street			22 October 1982	TQ5451966063; 51°22′21″N 0°13′07″E		1275472	Upload Photo	Q26565053
Underberg	II	High Street			1 August 1952	TQ5427065734; 51°22′11″N 0°12′53″E		1275534	Upload Photo	Q26565111
Vine Cottage and Rose Cottage	II	High Street			10 November 1975	TQ5417165628; 51°22′08″N 0°12′48″E		1275487	Upload Photo	Q26565067
Walls on North East and South West Sides of North West Garden at Little Mote	II	High Street			9 August 1985	TQ5420265925; 51°22′17″N 0°12′50″E		1223485	Upload Photo	Q26517751
Whitewood Cottages	II	1 and 2, High Street			22 October 1982	TQ5425865720; 51°22′11″N 0°12′53″E		1217163	Upload Photo	Q26511896
Whitewood Cottages	II	3, High Street			20 June 1988	TQ5425465713; 51°22′10″N 0°12′53″E		1223111	Upload Photo	Q26679685
Whitewood Cottages (No 4), the Nook (No 5) and Harvey Elend and Co (No 6)	II	4, 5 and 6, High Street			22 October 1982	TQ5425065707; 51°22′10″N 0°12′52″E		1275533	Upload Photo	Q26565110
Windmill Cottage	II	High Street			1 June 1967	TQ5419065616; 51°22′07″N 0°12′49″E		1217222	Upload Photo	Q26511951
Barn at Newbarn Farm	II	Lullingstone Lane			22 October 1982	TQ5317764937; 51°21′46″N 0°11′56″E		1275539	Upload Photo	Q26565116
Church of Saint Botolph	I	Lullingstone Lane, Lullingstone			1 June 1967	TQ5299264436; 51°21′30″N 0°11′45″E		1222051	Church of Saint Botolph More images	Q17529853
Darenth Cottage	II	Lullingstone Lane			22 October 1982	TQ5373165693; 51°22′10″N 0°12′26″E		1217171	Upload Photo	Q26511904
Dovecot at Lullingstone Castle	II	Lullingstone Lane, Lullingstone			1 August 1952	TQ5309364532; 51°21′33″N 0°11′51″E		1217174	Upload Photo	Q26511905
Eynsford Viaduct	II	Lullingstone Lane			1 June 1967	TQ5341165566; 51°22′06″N 0°12′09″E		1222029	Eynsford Viaduct More images	Q26516385
Former Stabling to South of Gatehouse and Stable Cottage	II	Lullingstone Lane, Lullingstone			3 April 1990	TQ5292664378; 51°21′28″N 0°11′42″E		1222139	Upload Photo	Q26516489
Garden Walls to Lullingstone Castle Immediately North of the Church of Saint Botolph	II	Lullingstone Lane, Lullingstone			22 October 1982	TQ5303464447; 51°21′31″N 0°11′48″E		1222213	Upload Photo	Q26516559
Icehouse in the Grounds of Lullingstone Castle	II	Lullingstone Lane, Lullingstone			22 October 1982	TQ5316564309; 51°21′26″N 0°11′54″E		1222211	Upload Photo	Q26516557
Lullingstone Castle	II*	Lullingstone Lane, Lullingstone			1 August 1952	TQ5301264382; 51°21′28″N 0°11′46″E		1222202	Lullingstone Castle More images	Q6702874
Moll Cob	II	Lullingstone Lane, Lullingstone			22 October 1982	TQ5302964347; 51°21′27″N 0°11′47″E		1274786	Upload Photo	Q26564424
Ruins of Bath House at Lullingstone Castle	II	Lullingstone Lane, Lullingstone			22 October 1982	TQ5325164484; 51°21′32″N 0°11′59″E		1274762	Upload Photo	Q26564403
The Gatehouse to Lullingstone Castle	I	Lullingstone Lane, Lullingstone			1 June 1967	TQ5292864411; 51°21′29″N 0°11′42″E		1217173	The Gatehouse to Lullingstone Castle More images	Q17641316
Eynsford Hill and Attached Terrace Walls, Masonry, Steps and Gazebo	II	Masonry, Steps And Gazebo, Crockenhill Lane			15 January 2002	TQ5367066205; 51°22′27″N 0°12′23″E		1389649	Upload Photo	Q26669082
Eynsford Bridge	II	Riverside			1 June 1967	TQ5399865534; 51°22′05″N 0°12′39″E		1222305	Eynsford Bridge More images	Q17641364
Home Farmhouse	II	3, Riverside			1 August 1952	TQ5374565639; 51°22′08″N 0°12′26″E		1222221	Upload Photo	Q26516567
No 32 (malt Cottage) and No 34 (the Malt House)	II	32 and 34, Riverside			1 June 1967	TQ5386565605; 51°22′07″N 0°12′32″E		1222220	Upload Photo	Q26516566
Nos 14,16 and 18 (plough Cottages) and No 22	II	16 and 18 (plough Cottages) And No 22, 14, 16, 18 and 20, Riverside			22 October 1982	TQ5394065573; 51°22′06″N 0°12′36″E		1222218	Upload Photo	Q26516564
The Old Mill	II	Riverside			22 October 1982	TQ5401165538; 51°22′05″N 0°12′40″E		1222217	Upload Photo	Q26516563
Toll Bar Cottage	II	5, Riverside			1 June 1967	TQ5372965660; 51°22′09″N 0°12′25″E		1222222	Upload Photo	Q26516568
Tudor Cottage	II	20, Riverside			1 August 1952	TQ5394965568; 51°22′06″N 0°12′37″E		1222336	Upload Photo	Q26516673
Fountain Cottages	II	1 and 2, Sober Lane			1 June 1967	TQ5420365603; 51°22′07″N 0°12′50″E		1217055	Upload Photo	Q26511796
Avenue Cottage	II	Station Road			22 October 1982	TQ5391965414; 51°22′01″N 0°12′35″E		1222225	Upload Photo	Q26516571
Bay Tree Cottages	II	2, Station Road			22 October 1982	TQ5387065400; 51°22′01″N 0°12′32″E		1222224	Upload Photo	Q26516570
The Cottage	II	Station Road			22 October 1982	TQ5391265412; 51°22′01″N 0°12′34″E		1274752	Upload Photo	Q26564394
Willow Cottage	II	Station Road			22 October 1982	TQ5393965435; 51°22′02″N 0°12′36″E		1274753	Upload Photo	Q26564395
Yew Tree Cottage and Yew Cottage	II	Station Road			1 June 1967	TQ5387665362; 51°21′59″N 0°12′33″E		1274751	Upload Photo	Q26564393
Barn at Upper Austin Lodge Farm	II	Upper Austin Lodge Road			22 October 1982	TQ5426062909; 51°20′40″N 0°12′49″E		1274659	Upload Photo	Q26564307
Barn to North West of Lower Austin Lodge Farmhouse	II	Upper Austin Lodge Road, DA4 0HT			22 October 1982	TQ5379063809; 51°21′09″N 0°12′26″E		1222227	Upload Photo	Q26516573
Lower Austin Lodge Farmhouse	II	Upper Austin Lodge Road			22 October 1982	TQ5381663768; 51°21′08″N 0°12′27″E		1222406	Upload Photo	Q26516738

== See also ==
- Grade I listed buildings in Kent
- Grade II* listed buildings in Kent

== Sources ==
- Newman, John (2012) [1969], Kent: West and the Weald, The Buildings of England, New Haven and London: Yale University Press, ISBN 978-0-300-18509-6
