= St Botolph's Church, Lullingstone =

Church of St Botolph
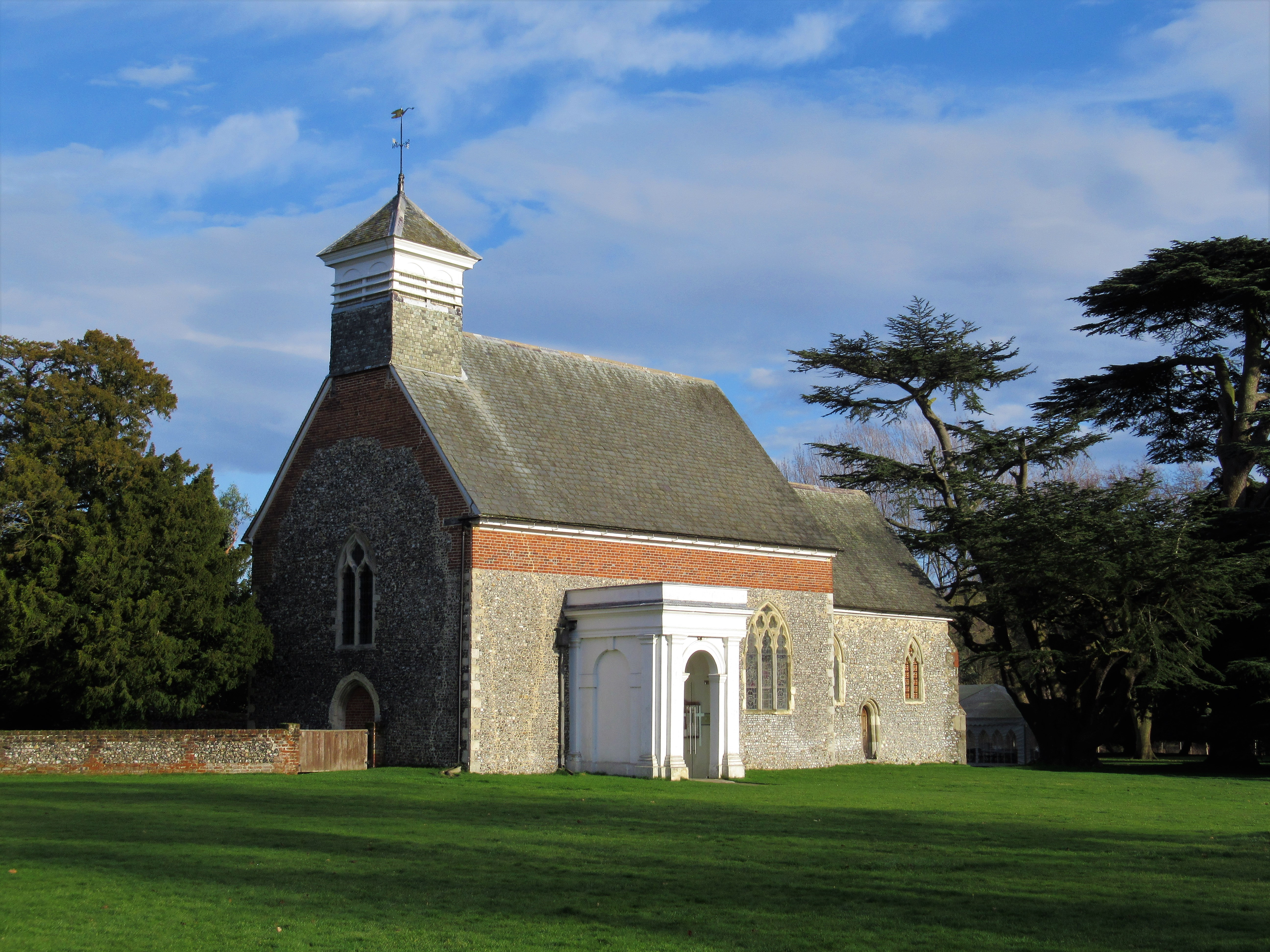
- Church of St Botolph
- 51°21′30.24″N 0°11′45.45″E
- OS grid reference: TQ 529 644
- Location: Lullingstone, Kent
- Country: England
- Denomination: Church of England
- Website: www.efl-churches.org

History
- Dedication: Saint Botolph

Architecture
- Heritage designation: Grade I
- Designated: 1 June 1967

Administration
- Diocese: Rochester

St Botolph's Church is an Anglican church in the village of Lullingstone, in Kent, England, situated on the lawn of Lullingstone Castle. It dates from the 14th century with later modifications, and it is a Grade I listed building.

== Description ==
The church was built of knapped flint about 1349; the north chapel, built of brick, was added in the 16th century, and the porch dates from the 18th century. It has a slate roof on the south side, and clay tiles on the north. It was described in 1797 by Edward Hasted: "This church, to the credit of the patrons of it, who for a long succession of time have resided in the family seat almost adjoining to it, is remarkable for the neat and decent state in which it is kept. It is paved with white and black marble, the pews are regularly wainscoted, the windows adorned with coloured glass, and the ceiling ornamented with stucco...."

=== Sixteenth century ===
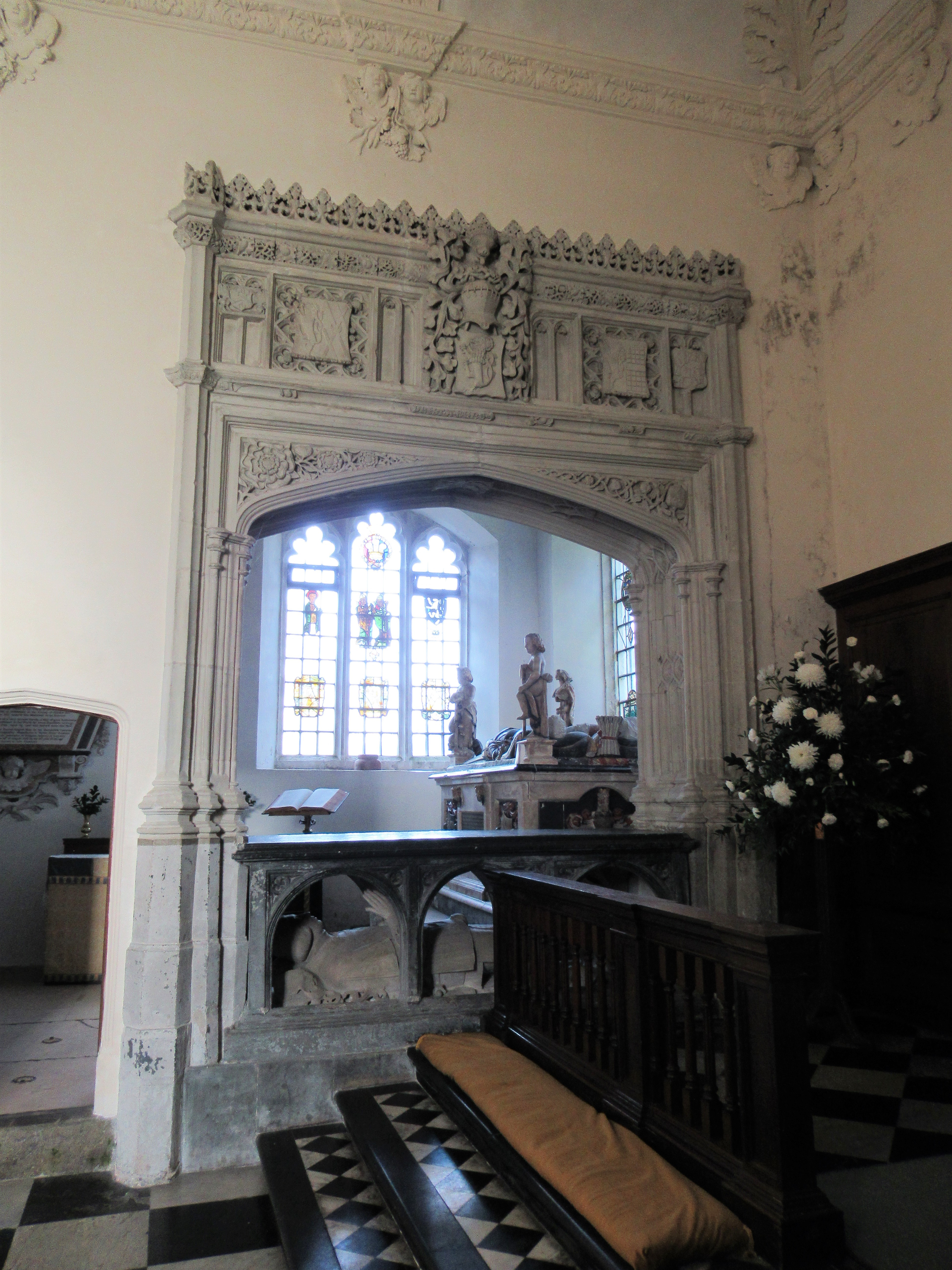
Tomb of Sir John Peché, north of the altar; beyond is the tomb of Sir George Hart

Sir John Peché (died 1521), owner of the manor of Lullingstone, was a knight banneret, Lord Deputy of Calais and Sheriff of Kent. The rood screen, made in the early 16th century, was the gift of Sir John. His tomb, carved in great detail, is between the chancel and the north chapel: the chapel was constructed to accommodate the tomb.

There is a monument on the south wall of the chancel to Sir John Peché's nephew and heir Sir Percyvall Hart (died 1581) and his wife Friedeswide. A chest tomb in the north chapel commemorates their son Sir George Hart (died 1587) and his wife Elizabeth.

=== Eighteenth century ===
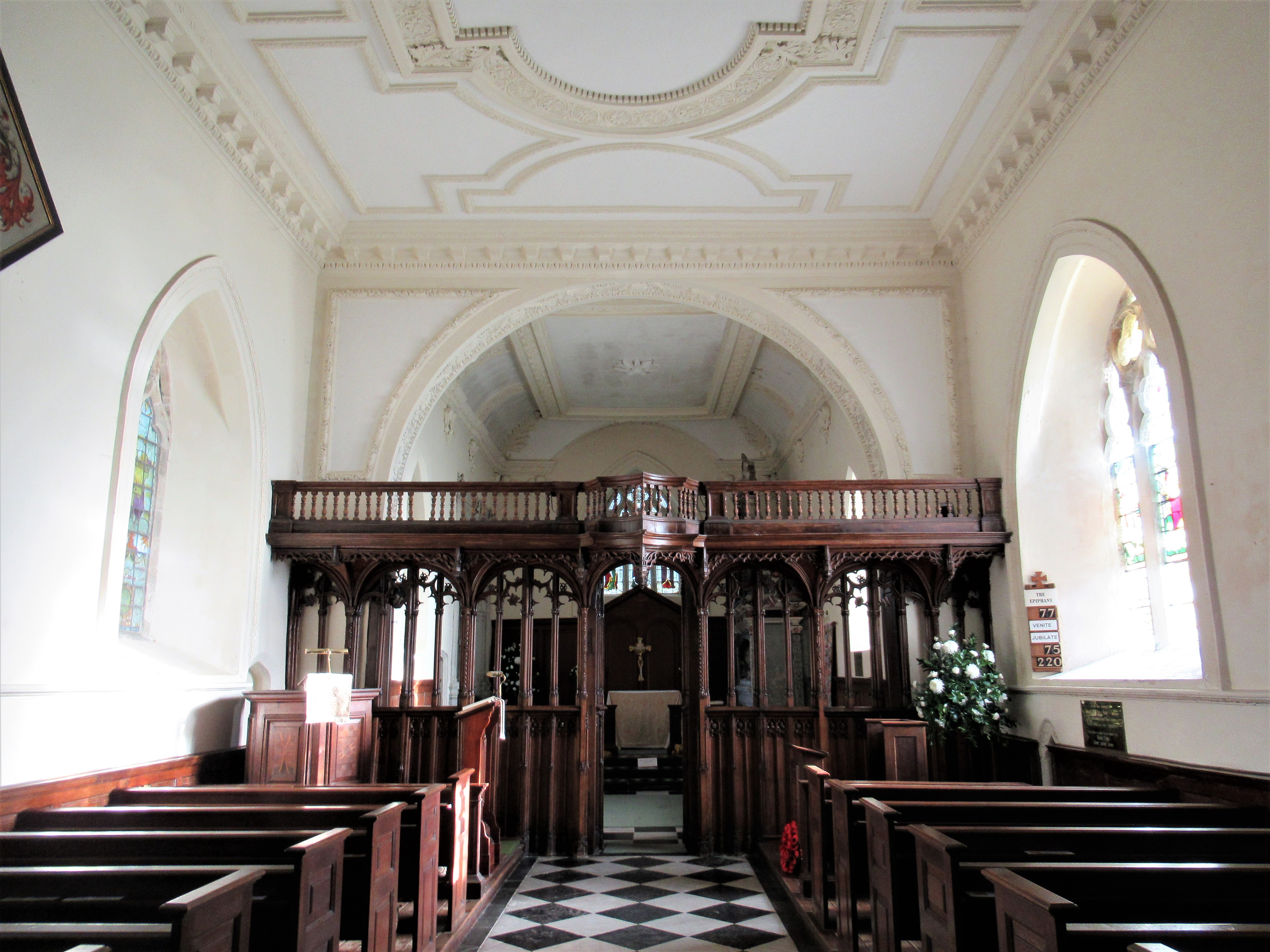
Interior looking east, showing the rood screen and the ceiling

In the 18th century, Percyvall Hart (died 1738) added an ornate plaster ceiling to the nave, the roof being heightened by thirteen courses of brick. He also donated the marble font, the porch at the entrance, and the bell turret. His monument is on the west wall of the chapel.

=== Stained glass ===
There is a stained glass window of the 14th century in the north of the chapel; there are 16th-century windows in the south of the nave, and in the east and south of the chancel.
