= Lullingstone Airfield =

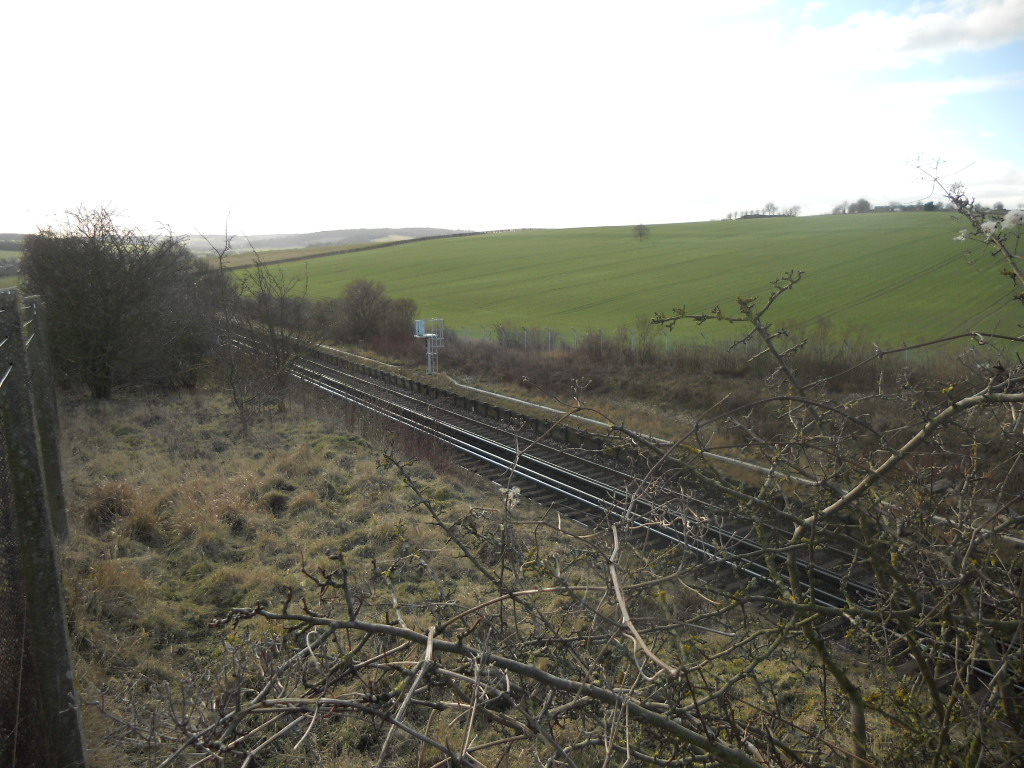
- The remains of Lullingstone station, with the site of the proposed airfield behind.
- IATA: N/A; ICAO: N/A

Summary
- Serves: London
- Location: Lullingstone, Kent
- Elevation AMSL: 367 ft / 112 m
- Coordinates: 51°22′6″N 0°11′24″E

Map

Lullingstone airfield was a proposed airfield in Kent, United Kingdom that was not constructed. Lullingstone railway station was constructed to serve the airport, but never opened to public services.

== History ==
In the late 1930s, it was reported that Imperial Airways was looking for an alternative to Croydon Airport. They were considering a site at Lullingstone, Kent, on which a new airport would be constructed. One of the problems affecting operators based at Croydon was a lack of hotel accommodation. The Southern Railway had an option to purchase the land and build the airport. Imperial Airways were to use it for their European services. However, Flight reported as early as March 1937 that Imperial Airways were not looking to move from Croydon, despite its problems with fog. The land on which the airfield was to have been built was owned by the Kemp Town Brewing Company, of Brighton, East Sussex. The airfield was to occupy 800 acres (320 ha).

The airfield was to have had four runways. A station on the Maidstone Line was partly built. It was situated between Lullingstone Tunnel and Eynsford Viaduct. It was planned to build a short double track branch line from Lullingstone station to the airfield. The station was planned to have had four platforms, two on the main line and two on the branch. The Southern Railway obtained approval from Parliament to construct the branch in February 1937. At that time, it was reported that the opening of the airport would be at least eighteen months away. Only the platforms and associated buildings on the main line part of the station were built. It was envisaged that trains from the station would run to London Victoria station.

At the 1938 Annual General Meeting, the Southern Railway stated that, in their opinion, the cost of levelling the ground and providing the necessary infrastructure associated with an airport, was something that was beyond a private company. They were of the opinion that it should be met partly by the state and partly by the County Council. It was stated that there would not be sufficient return on expenditure under the conditions then current to justify the expenditure necessary to construct the airport. The Southern Railway's option to purchase the land had expired by February 1939. It was reported that negotiations between the landowners and the Air Ministry were ongoing at that time. It was reported at that time that completion was then three years off.

During World War II, a decoy airfield was constructed at Lullingstone. Six dummy Hawker Hurricanes were placed on the airfield. It was in use from April 1940 to February 1942.

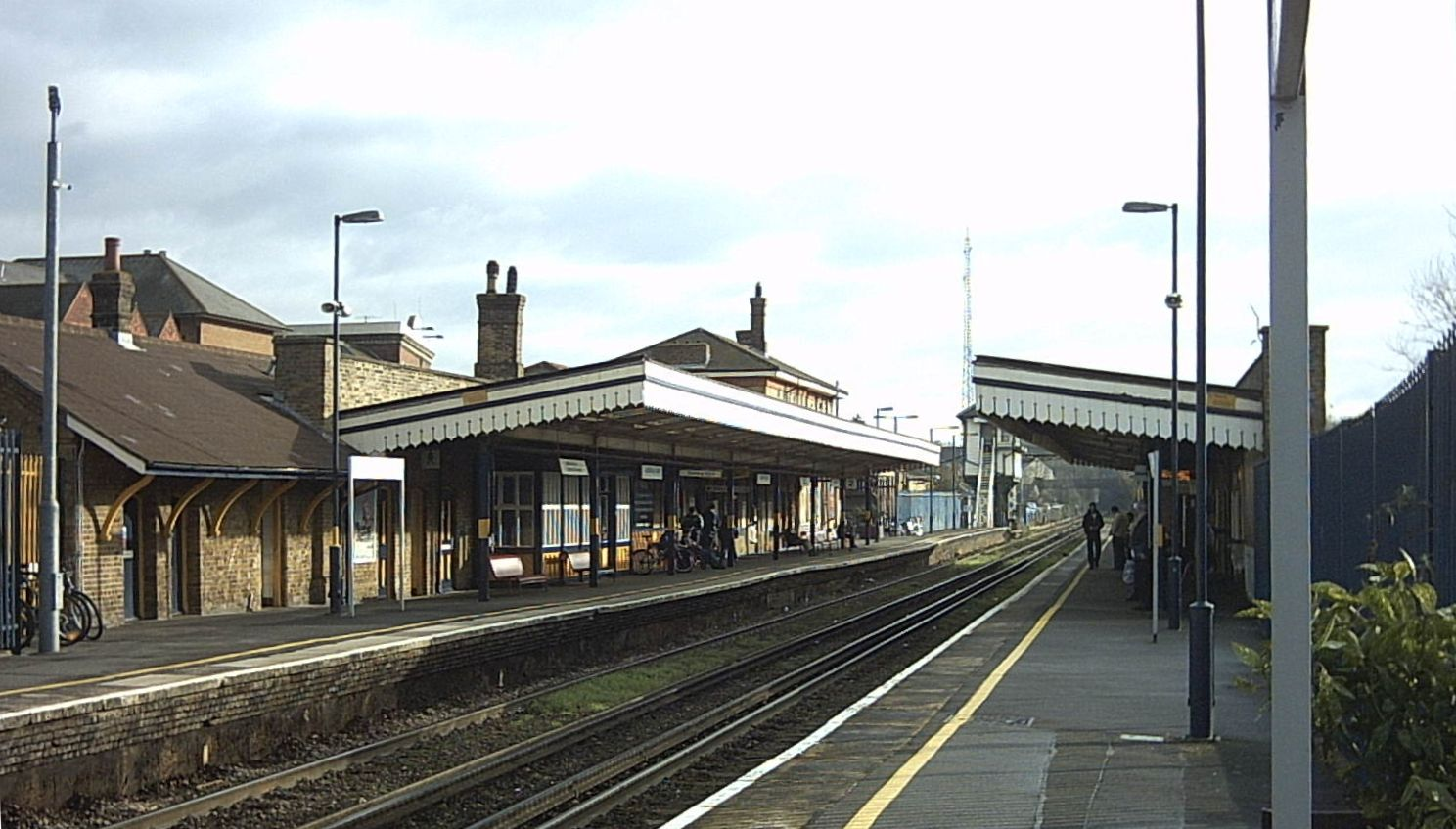
The canopies at Canterbury East were originally erected at Lullingstone.

The station appeared on railway timetables from May 1939 to June 1954, and was shown as open on the 1940 Ordnance Survey map. A planned housing development did not take place. Post-war Green Belt legislation prevented the scheme from being carried out, with developers preferring Heathrow as the site of a new London airport, due to it already being partly built and thus a cheaper option. The station buildings were demolished in March 1955, with the platform canopies being re-erected at Canterbury East station.
