= Lullingstone Roman Villa =

Roman villa in Britain

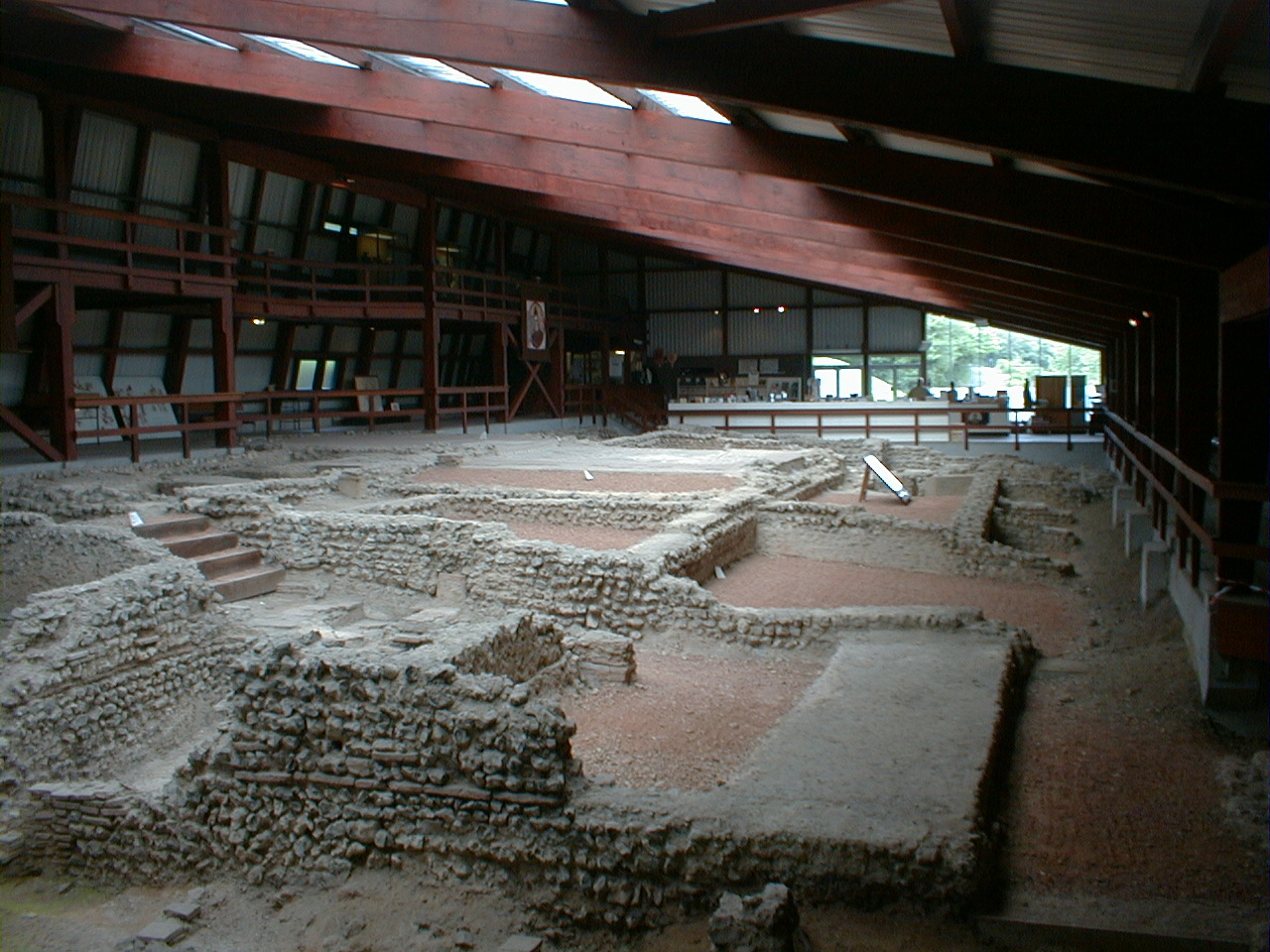
- The enclosed interior of Lullingstone Villa

- Location within Kent

General information
- Architectural style: Romano-British Villa
- Location: Lullingstone grid reference TQ53016508, United Kingdom
- Coordinates: 51.3640°N 0.1964°E
- Construction started: 1st century
- Demolished: 5th century

Lullingstone Roman Villa is a villa built during the Roman occupation of Britain, situated in Lullingstone near the village of Eynsford in Kent, south-eastern England. The villa is located in the Darent Valley, along with six others, including those at Crofton, Crayford and Dartford. Constructed in the 1st century, perhaps around AD 80–90, the house was repeatedly expanded and occupied until it was destroyed by fire in the 4th or 5th century. The villa was occupied over various periods within the Romano-British period, but after its destruction, it is only thought to have been reoccupied during the medieval period. The occupants were most likely wealthy Romans or native Britons who had adopted Roman customs.

Some evidence found on site suggests that around 150, the villa was considerably enlarged and may have been used as the country retreat of the governors of the Roman province of Britannia. Two sculpted marble busts found in the cellar may be those of Pertinax, governor in 185–186, and his father-in-law, Publius Helvius Successus. In the 4th century a room, probably already in religious use, was converted to a Christian chapel or house church, the earliest known in the British Isles.

In the Anglo-Saxon period, the ruins of a Roman temple-mausoleum on the site of the villa were incorporated into a Christian chapel (Lullingstone Chapel) that was extant at the time of the Norman Conquest, one of the earliest known chapels in the country.

In addition to the pagan shrine in the villa's chapel and the dining room mosaics, the villa produced significant artistic finds including the Lullingstone Victory Gem and the busts.

== History ==
Layout, c. 400

=== Construction ===
The earliest part of the villa was built around AD 82. It was situated in an area near several other villas, and was close to Watling Street, a Roman road by which travellers could move to and from Londinium, Durobrivae, Durovernum Cantiacorum, and the major Roman port of Rutupiae (i.e., London, Rochester, Canterbury, and Richborough, respectively).

=== Enlargement ===
Around 150 AD the villa was expanded and a heated bath block with hypocaust was added, but it was later rebuilt around 290 AD after being abandoned for almost a century. Two marble busts from the 2nd century found in the cellar perhaps depict the owners or residents of the villa, which may have been the designated country retreat of the provincial governors. There is some evidence that the busts are those of Pertinax, governor of Britannia in 185–186 (and later Roman emperor in 193), and his father.

In the 3rd century, a larger furnace for the hypocaust as well as an expanded bath block were added, as were a temple-mausoleum and a large granary. In the 4th century, the dining room was equipped with a fine mosaic floor with one illustration of Zeus or Jupiter, disguised as a bull, abducting Europa and a second depicting Bellerophon killing the Chimera.

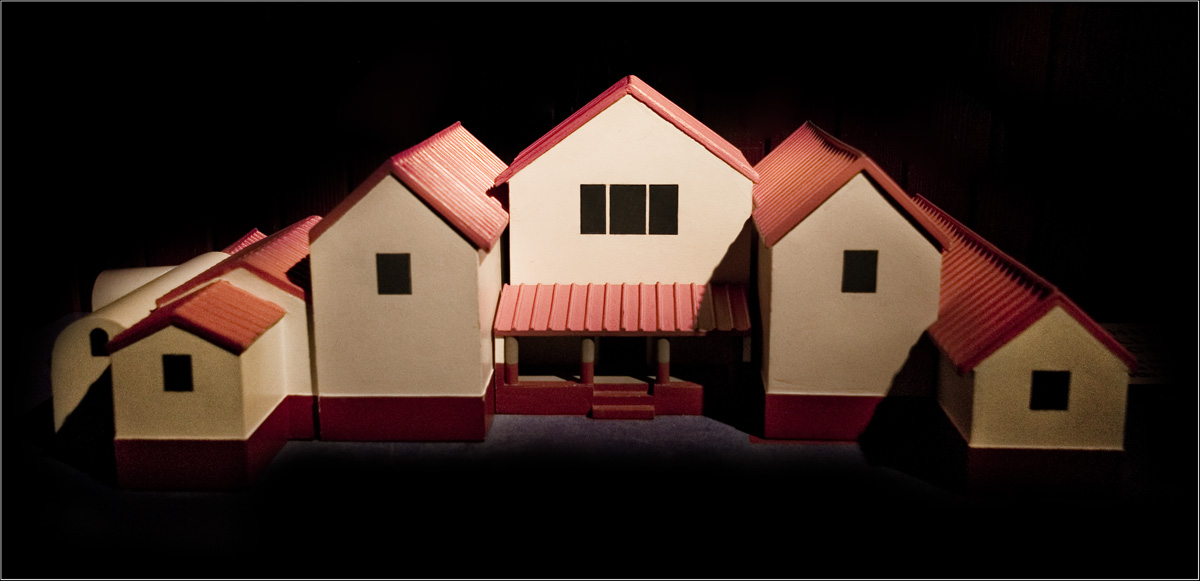
Model of the Roman Villa

=== Destruction and rediscovery ===
Sometime early in the 5th century, a fire destroyed the building, and it was abandoned and forgotten until its excavation in the 20th century.

The first discovery of the site was made in 1750, when workers fencing a deer park dug post holes through a mosaic floor. While the discovery and some additional evidence was noted, no further excavation took place.

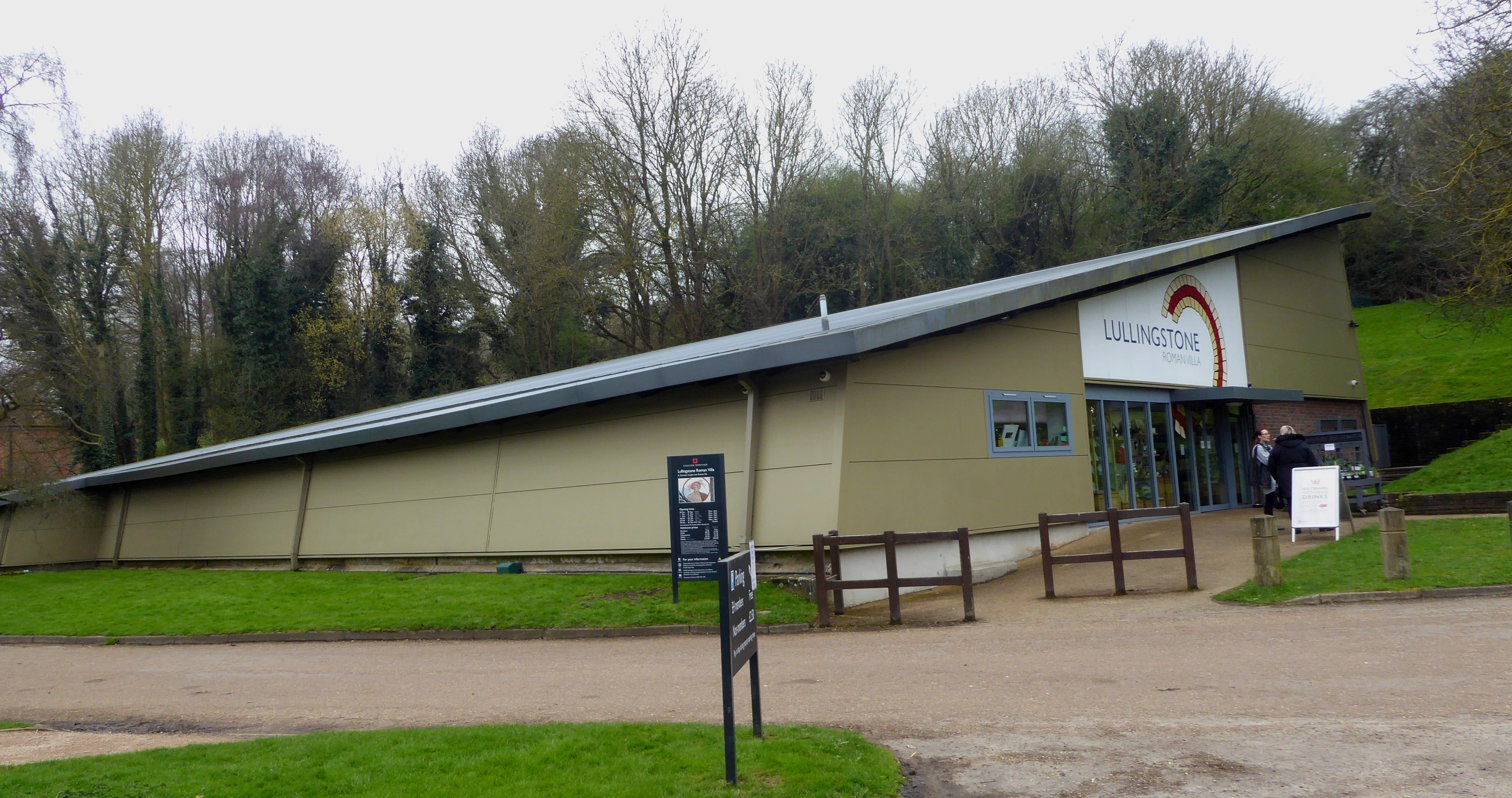
Exterior building of the Lullingstone Roman Villa built in the 20th century.

It wasn't until 1939 that the ruins of the villa were rediscovered by E. Greensfield and E. Birchenough when they noticed evidence of Roman walls and mosaic fragments beneath a blown-down tree. In the mid-20th century (1949–1961) the site was finally excavated by multiple teams of archaeologists. Until this first excavation, the villa and the rest of the Lullingstone ruins had remained untouched since its destruction. The ruins themselves were preserved under a specially designed cover in the 1960s, when the villa was taken over by English Heritage, who opened the ruins to the public. The building began to leak late in the 20th century and required a major £1.8m renovation and display project in 2006 to 2008 so artefacts from the Lullingstone site could be safely displayed within it.

In his excavation reports, Lieutenant-Colonel G. W. Meates covers the initial excavation of the site, including the discovery of the boundaries of the villa, coin and pottery evidence, and various rooms that were discovered. In the two earliest reports, Meates creates a rough timeline of the Lullingstone Villa ranging from the 1st century AD until the Post-Roman periods, including its purposes, room construction, abandonment, and its final destruction. In addition to the timeline and room descriptions, there are also detailed reports of the evidence found, such as pottery, coins, and soil and clay levels which indicate the time periods in which the villa is being observed.

=== Eras of occupation ===
==== 1st century ====
During the original excavations of the site in the 1950s, evidence from various centuries was discovered, creating a timeline for the villa. The earliest evidence comes from the 1st century AD. Many shards of pottery were found on the slope that the excavation site was located on. The shards found are considered to be hand-made with elements of "Belgic culture".

==== 2nd century: the Flavian to Antonine period ====
At the original excavation, the full extent of the house built and maintained during the Flavian dynasty to the Nerva-Antonine dynasty was unknown. However, it is thought that the Bath Room and the Basement Room may have been built during this era. From geological evidence, such as different layers of clay, it is suggested that the few stairs leading to the basement were built during this period rather than the 4th century, as originally thought.

==== 3rd century ====
Based on pottery evidence, it is thought that the Lullingstone Roman Villa was abandoned for at least the first half of the 3rd century AD. Coins found at the site provide evidence that the occupation of the villa resumed sometime during the last half of the 3rd century during the reigns of Claudius II and Allectus. It is thought that the pagan shrine and other Christian rooms were constructed during this era after the period of abandonment. In addition to the Christian elements that were added to the villa, the 3rd century was also when some of the villa's main external buildings, including the granary and the temple, were constructed.

==== 4th century ====
The 4th century was an eventful era for the villa, with large renovations taking place, and probably the fire. Some of the renovations of the villa include the designing of the mosaic floor in Room 5 and the construction of another room. Excavators were able to date the construction of the mosaic floor in Room 5 using coins depicting Constantine II that were accidentally mixed into the concrete.

==== Post-Roman period ====
At the initial excavation in the 1950s, there was no evidence that suggested occupation of the villa or its site from its destruction until at least medieval times. From English Heritage, there is documentation of some findings including a "hanging bowl" and other Anglo-Saxon potsherds. This evidence suggests that the site may have been used as a burial ground in early Anglo-Saxon Britain.

== Rooms ==
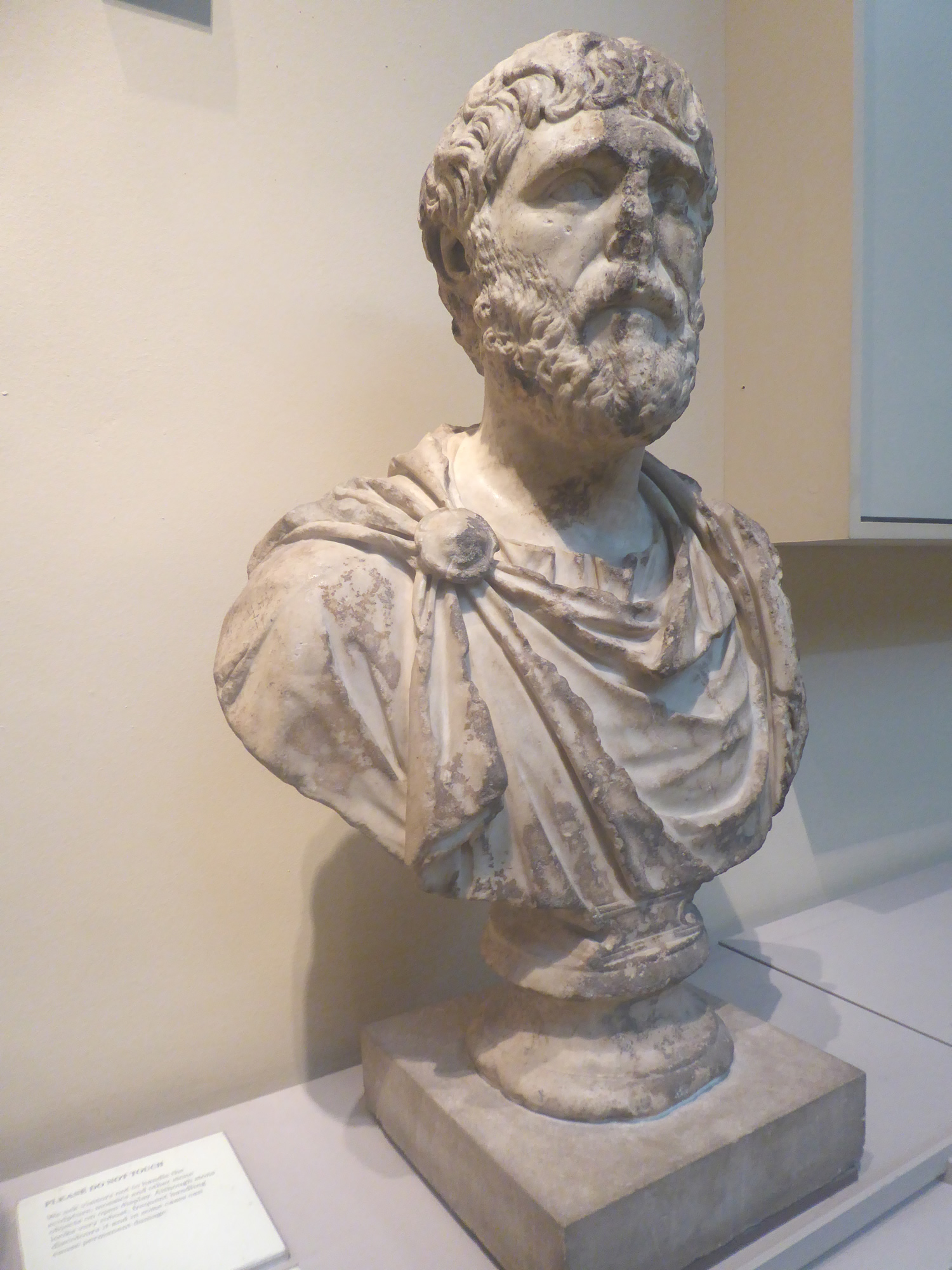
Marble bust found in the shrine room, the original of which is in the British Museum. It depicts a man who is about 50 years old, possibly a family member, or possibly the Emperor Pertinax when he was governor of the province of Britannia.

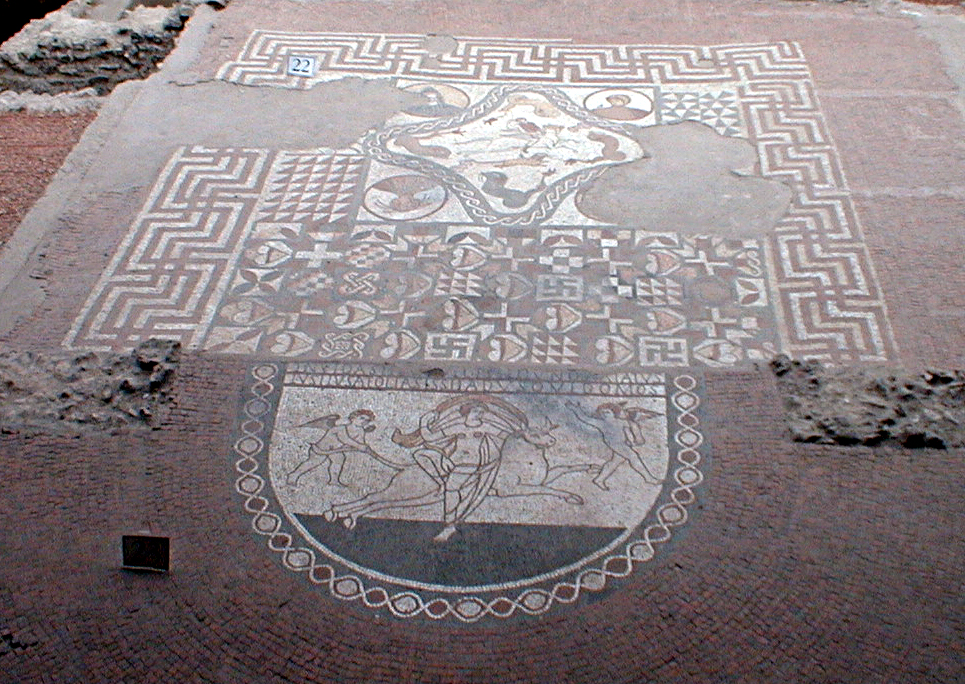
The mosaic at Lullingstone Villa depicting the Rape of Europa

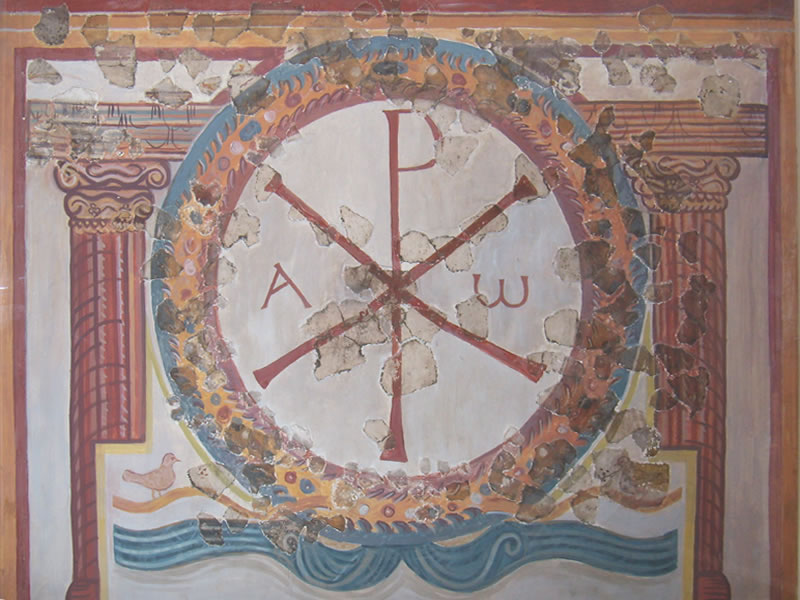
Chi-Rho fresco from Lullingstone Villa, which contains the only known Christian paintings from the Roman era in Britain.

=== Dining room ===
Rooms 12 and 13, previously known as Rooms 9 and 10, include the dining room, or triclinium, which was situated in the centre of the main building. As the largest room in the villa on the western side, it connected all other rooms to the north and south together via a large verandah. The dining room was highly decorated with a pair of large mosaics on the floor dating to the mid-4th century. One depicts the abduction of the princess Europa by the god Jupiter or Zeus who is disguised as a bull, whilst the other depicts Bellerophon slaying the Chimera, whilst surrounded by four sea creatures, including dolphins. In each of the four corners of the Bellerophon mosaic there is a bust of the seasons personified including winter, spring, summer, and autumn. Surrounding these mosaics were smaller images depicting hearts, crosses and swastikas. Even though these artworks are usually only seen as depictions of myth, it is also thought by some scholars that these works were meant to ward off the evil eye. Based on the artwork and the shape of the apse, it is thought that this room was also meant for entertaining. With the measurements of the apse being 6.25 metres by 4.88 metres at its largest points, the dining room was spacious, with potentially enough room to contain a couch. The couch, usually able to seat three people, would have been 1.5 metres to 2 metres in width, and directly facing the mosaic artwork so that it could be viewed in the correct orientation by all visitors.

=== Bath Wing ===
Thought to have been constructed in the Flavian–Antonine period, the Bath Wing was renovated and constantly used throughout the villa's existence. After the abandonment of the villa for almost a century, the Bath Wing was renovated, though the details of renovations are not mentioned. During the initial excavations, it was noted that the Bath Wing contained what G. W. Meates called a "combustion chamber". This chamber, filled with chalk, also shows evidence of burned charcoal that may have been used for heating.

=== Basement Room ===
During the original excavations of the site, it was thought that during its periods of use the Basement Room had multiple purposes, including as a garden room. It should also be noted that the term 'basement' cannot be interpreted to have the same meaning as the modern word. The walls of the room were highly decorated including orange, red, and green panels. Based on the archaeological and artistic evidence, the original height of the room is thought to have been 8 feet. When the villa was abandoned, the Basement Room was especially affected. Much of the walls and stairs were stripped of their materials, and were not replaced until the reoccupation of the villa. During the reoccupation, the walls of the Basement Room were redecorated and other details such as pottery were added. Partially destroyed by the fire, parts of the mosaic and the plaster from the room above fell into the Basement Room providing an abundance of intact evidence for the villa, which remained untouched until the beginning of the Lullingstone excavations in 1949.

=== Pagan shrine and Christian chapel ===
One room of the building had been used as both a pagan shrine and, later, as a Christian chapel, one of the earliest in Britain. Along with the Christian chapel, there were three or four other rooms that were also used for Christian purposes including a possible Antechamber and a Vestibule.

The original pagan shrine room was dedicated to local water deities, and a wall painting depicting three water nymphs dating from this period can still be seen in a niche in the room.

Just after the 3rd century, this niche had been covered over, as the whole room had been redecorated with white plaster painted with red bands, and two busts of male figures had been placed in the room. Some scholars have theorised that at this point the inhabitants focused their worship on household deities and ancestor spirits, largely abandoning the worship of the water deities.

In the 4th century the room above the pagan shrine was apparently converted to Christian use, with painted plaster on the walls, including a row of figures of standing worshipers (orans), and a characteristic Christian Chi-rho symbol. Some of the paintings are now on display in the British Museum.

According to English Heritage, which maintains the site:

The evidence of the Christian house-church is a unique discovery for Roman Britain and the wall paintings are of international importance. Not only do they provide some of the earliest evidence for Christianity in Britain, they are almost unique – the closest parallels come from a house-church in Dura Europus, Syria. Perhaps almost as remarkable as the discovery of the house-church is the possibility that pagan worship may have continued in the cult room below. What is not clear is whether this represented the family hedging their bets, trumpeting their apparent acceptance of Christianity, while trying to keep the old gods happy, or whether it represents some members of the family clinging to old beliefs in the face of the adoption of Christianity by others.

The overall purpose of the chapel other than worship is not certain, but it is thought that it was used for "liturgical worship" such as baptisms. Based on the fact that the Christian artwork was large in size, K. S. Painter suggests that the owners of the villa at this time were not only Christians, but also wealthy.

=== Graves ===
A Romano-Celtic temple-mausoleum complex was constructed around 300 AD to hold the bodies of two young people, those of a male and a female, in lead coffins. Although the young woman's coffin was robbed in antiquity, the other remained in situ and undisturbed, and is now on display at the site.

== Art and artefacts ==
=== The Victory Gem ===
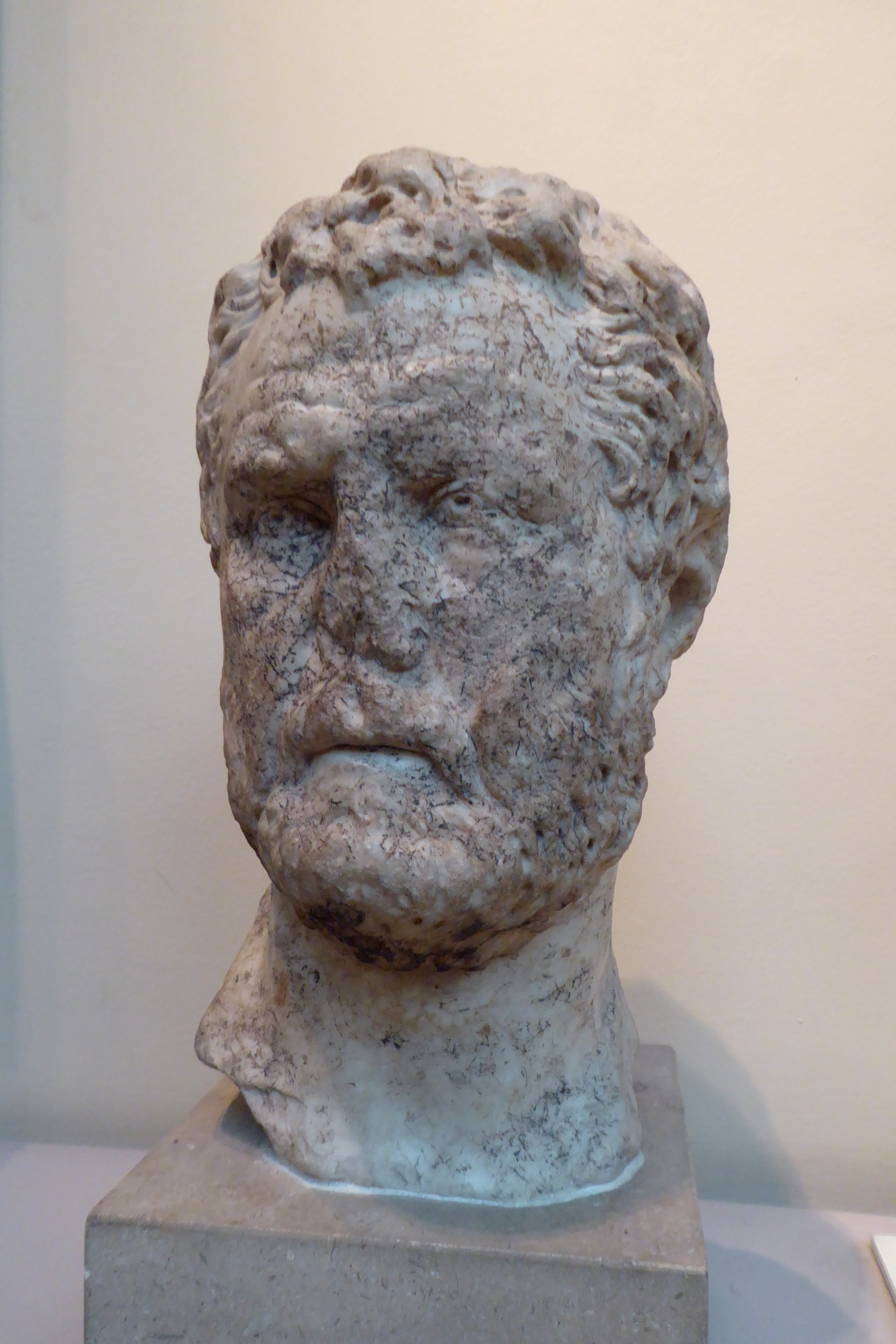
Bust from Lullingstone Roman Villa discovered in the Basement Room. Of the two discovered, it is comparatively more damaged.

Discovered during the initial excavations by G.W. Meates, the Victory Gem is a "Roman cornelian intaglio". Cornelian intaglios like this were normally set in rings, and based on its size, it is thought that its ring was large. Measuring 23 by 19 by 5 mm, it is one of the largest gems ever found in Britain. Considering the potential size of the ring and other remnants of precious metals on the gem, such as gold, Martin Henig suggests that the ring was once owned by a man that held both high status and wealth. The gem depicts personified Victory writing a message of triumph on a shield. It is thought that the gem has Greek characteristics as the artwork depicts elements of the goddesses Nike and Aphrodite.

=== Busts ===
The two marble busts found in the Basement Room are thought to represent Pertinax, governor in 185–186, and his father, Publius Helvius Successus. Some scholars suggest that these two busts provide insight into who occupied the villa in at least the 2nd century. One of the busts is thought to date to the Hadrianic period. Though they are both quite well preserved, the second, and larger of the busts was more damaged when it was found during the initial excavations. According to excavation reports, it is not entirely certain why they were placed in the Basement Room. It was noted, however, that after the period of abandonment, those who reoccupied the villa may have decided to keep them for their own purposes.
