= Lullingstone =

Hamlet in Kent, England

Coordinates: 51.35813°N 0.19318°E

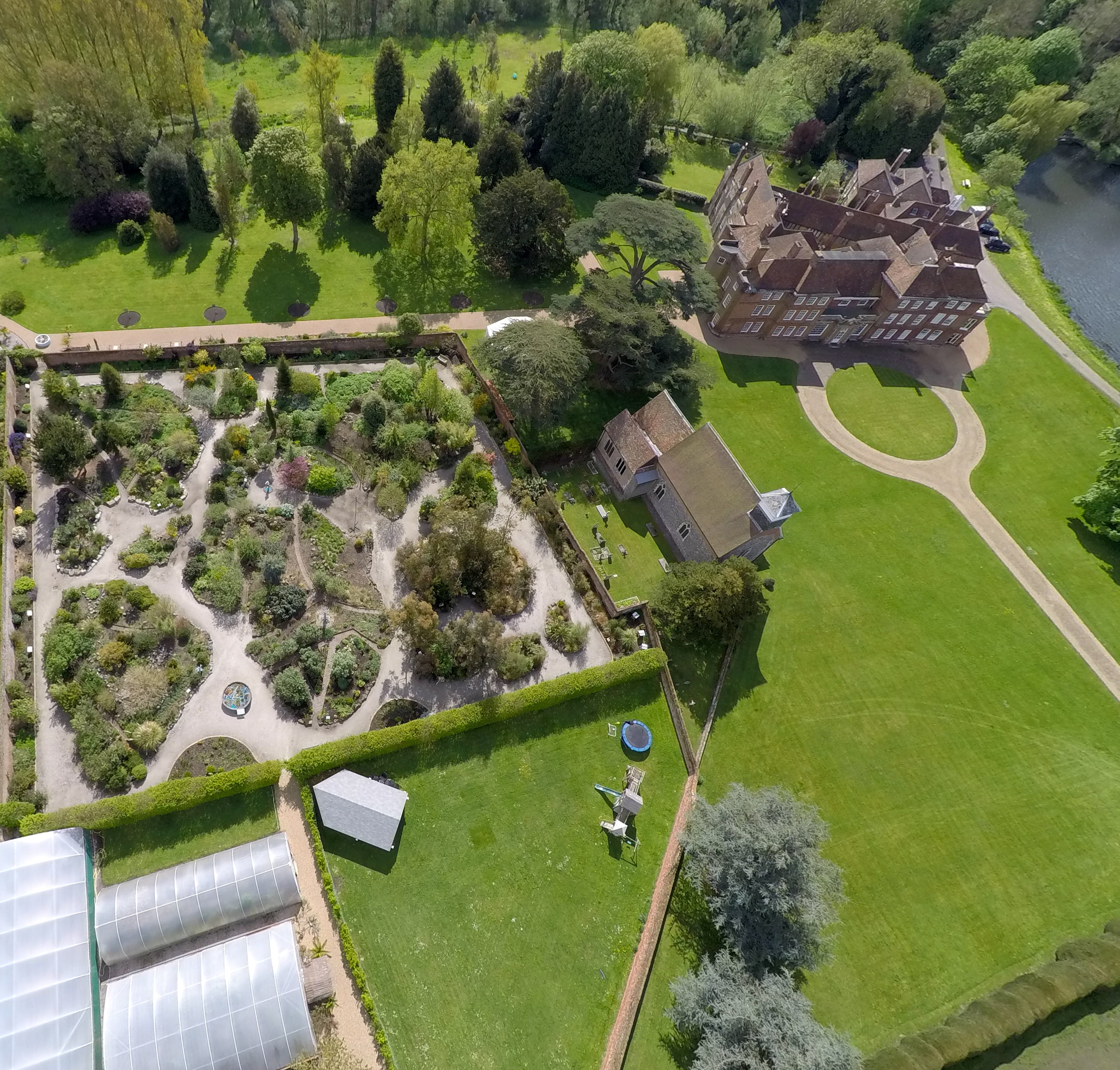
- Aerial view of Lullingstone Castle and St Botolph's Church

- Location within Kent
- OS grid reference: TQ528644
- Civil parish: Eynsford
- District: Sevenoaks
- Shire county: Kent
- Region: South East
- Country: England
- Sovereign state: United Kingdom
- Post town: Dartford
- Postcode district: DA4
- Dialling code: 01322
- Police: Kent
- Fire: Kent
- Ambulance: South East Coast

Lullingstone is a rural hamlet in the civil parish of Eynsford, in the Sevenoaks district of Kent, England, located south east of Swanley. It is best known for its castle, Roman villa and its public golf course.

Lullingstone was a civil parish until 1955. The parish was in Axstane Hundred and its successor Dartford Rural District.

== History ==
=== Pre-Roman ===
It is believed that an Iron Age hill fort is sited on the hill above the castle, although this is unconfirmed.

=== Roman Occupation ===
Lullingstone Roman villa was discovered in 1939, and is believed to have been built around 100 AD. It contains some of the finest excavated remains of a Roman villa in Britain, including a Romano-Christian chapel, displaying some of the earliest evidence of Christianity in Britain.

=== 20th century ===
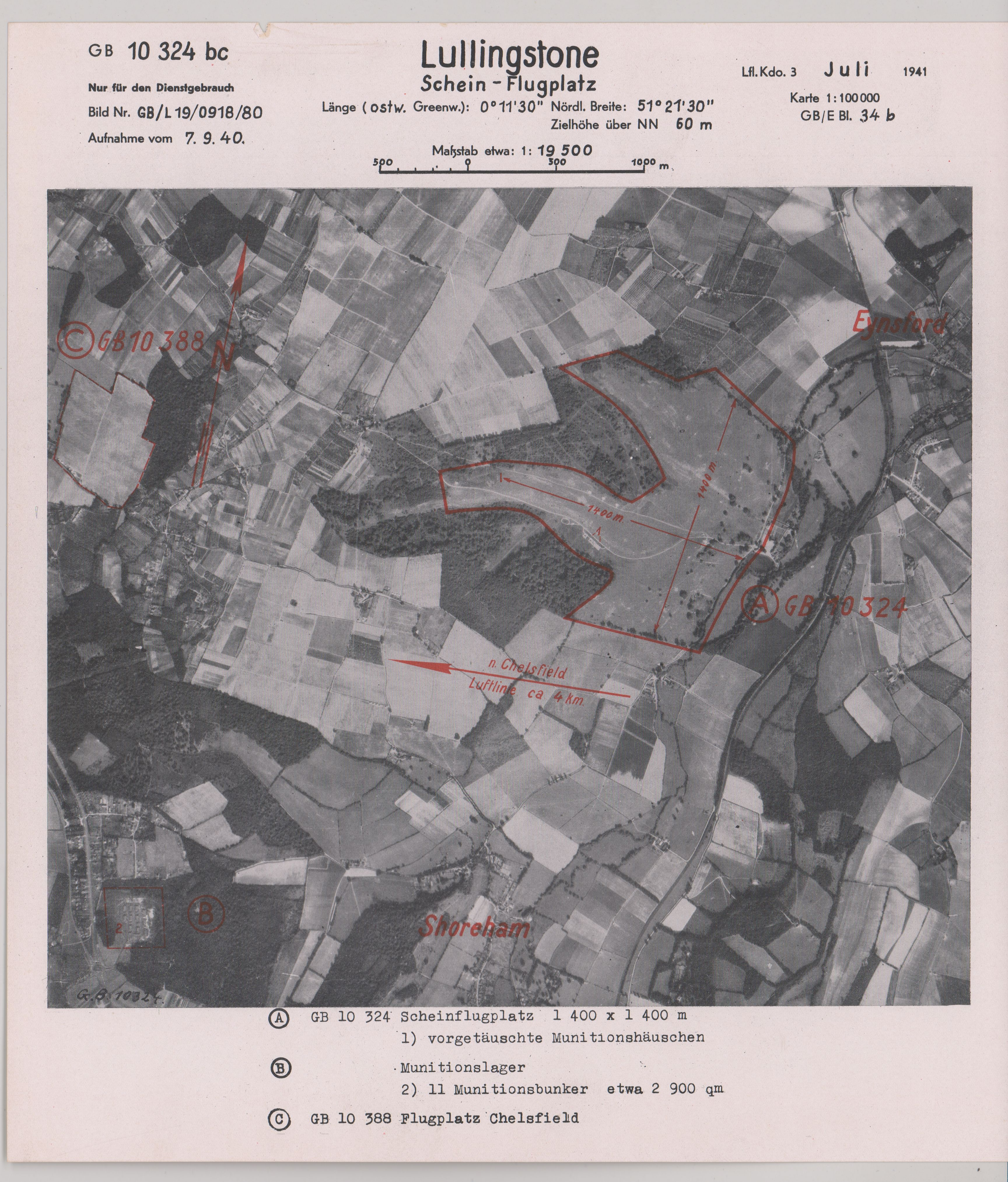
1941 target dossier of the German Luftwaffe depicting the decoy airfield

Nearby is the site of a decoy airfield for the nearby Biggin Hill airfield. Known as a Q-site, this was intended to entice bombers to misinterpret it as Biggin Hill.

In 1937 a plan was announced to create an airport the size of Heathrow in Lullingstone. The area of land had been reserved and construction of Lullingstone railway station to serve the site began. The proposal was abandoned at the outbreak of World War II.

Lullingstone Country Park was established in the 20th century.

In 1951 the parish had a population of 127. On 1 April 1955 the parish was abolished and merged with Eynsford.

== Transport ==
=== Railway ===
The nearest National Rail station is Eynsford.

A station to be named Lullingstone was built between Swanley and Eynsford in 1939, but never opened due to the outbreak of WWII. It appeared without a train service in Bradshaw's Guide by December 1944, through to September 1953, but had disappeared from Bradshaw by June 1954.
