= Eynsford =

Village in Kent, England

Coordinates: 51.365°N 0.211°E

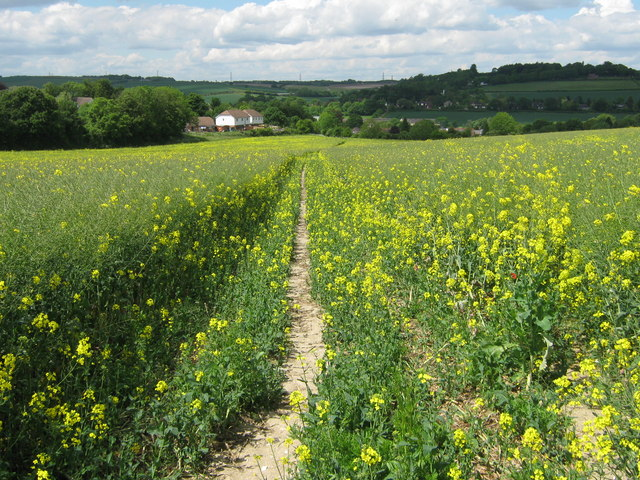
- Darent Valley Path, Eynsford

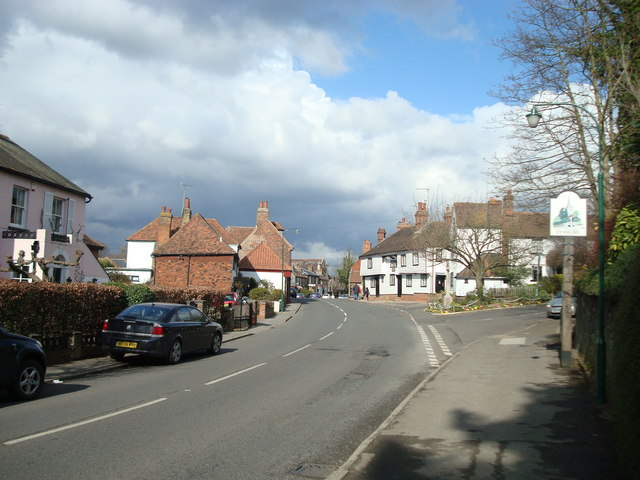
- Central view of the curved High Street

- Location within Kent
- Area: 14.54 km^{2} (5.61 sq mi)
- Population: 1,814 (2011 census)
  - Density: 125/km^{2} (320/sq mi)
- OS grid reference: TQ5365
- Civil parish: Eynsford
- District: Sevenoaks
- Shire county: Kent
- Region: South East
- Country: England
- Sovereign state: United Kingdom
- Post town: Dartford
- Postcode district: DA4
- Dialling code: 01322
- Police: Kent
- Fire: Kent
- Ambulance: South East Coast
- UK Parliament: Sevenoaks

Eynsford (/ˈeɪnsfərd/ or /ˈeɪnzfərd/) is a village and civil parish in the Sevenoaks District of Kent, England. It is located 3.3 miles (5 km) south east of Swanley, and 7 miles (11 km) south of Dartford, which is the village's postal town. Eynsford forms part of the London commuter belt.

The village including its farmland and woods occupies the northern half of the triangle formed by three motorways in west Kent barring its very northernmost part which is Farningham. This area is undulating and has a large minority of woodland. In the south of the parish is Lullingstone, much of which was owned for many centuries by the large, late medieval Lullingstone Castle, whereas other parts of the village were owned by Eynsford Castle, which is older. Well before the founding of the Kingdom of England, Lullingstone Roman villa was founded in this part of the parish, which is open to the public today. The Darent Valley Path takes in a cross-section of the area.

== The village ==
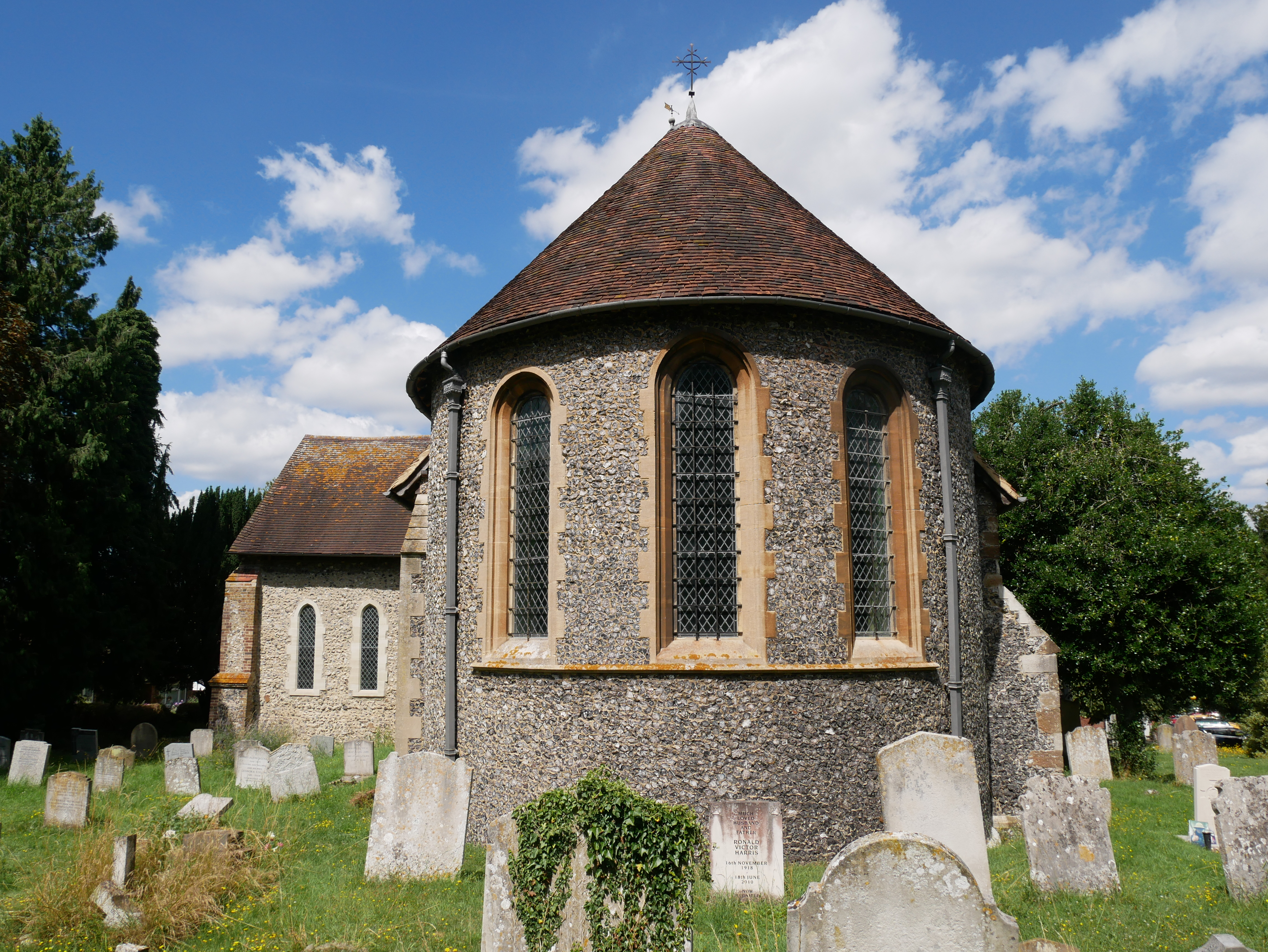
The east face of the medieval Church of St Martin in Eynsford

Eynsford is first mentioned in writing in 864, as "Egenes homme". The derivation is unclear, but one possibility is that it represents "Ægen's river-meadow", from the Old English hamm "river-meadow, enclosure". In 1801 the village had the highest population in the Dartford area, at 841 persons.

Village sign

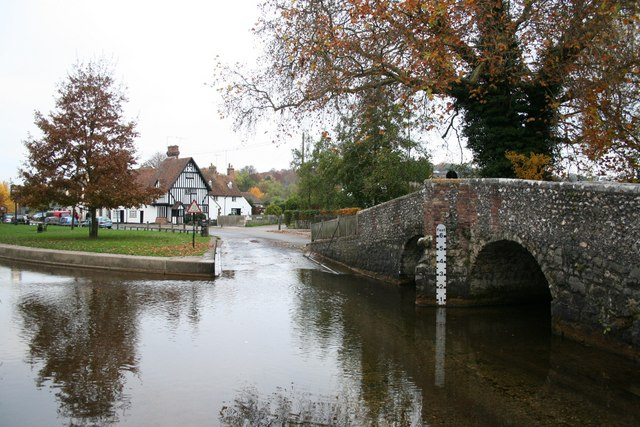
The ford through the Darent

In the centre of the village is a ford over the river, with a picturesque hump-back bridge alongside. There are many old buildings including the 16th-century Plough Inn and the Old Mill. The church is dedicated to St Martin. In about 1163, Thomas Becket is reputed to have excommunicated William de Eynsford, the owner of Eynsford castle. The excommunication was cancelled by King Henry II and the issue became part of the quarrel that led to Becket's murder in 1170.

John Wesley is thought to have preached here: he was a friend of the then vicar of Shoreham, the next village along the valley. The Wesley Stone by the bridge commemorates the spot.

It was near Eynsford village (at Austin Lodge) that Percy Pilcher constructed and successfully flew lightweight gliders. On 30 September 1899, having completed his triplane, he had intended to demonstrate it to a group of onlookers and potential sponsors in a field near Stanford Hall, Leicestershire. However, days before, the engine crankshaft had broken and, so as not to disappoint his guests, he decided to fly the Hawk instead. The weather was stormy and rainy, but by 4 pm Pilcher decided the weather was good enough to fly. Whilst flying, the tail snapped and Pilcher plunged 10 metres (33 feet) to the ground: he died two days later from his injuries with his triplane having never been publicly flown.

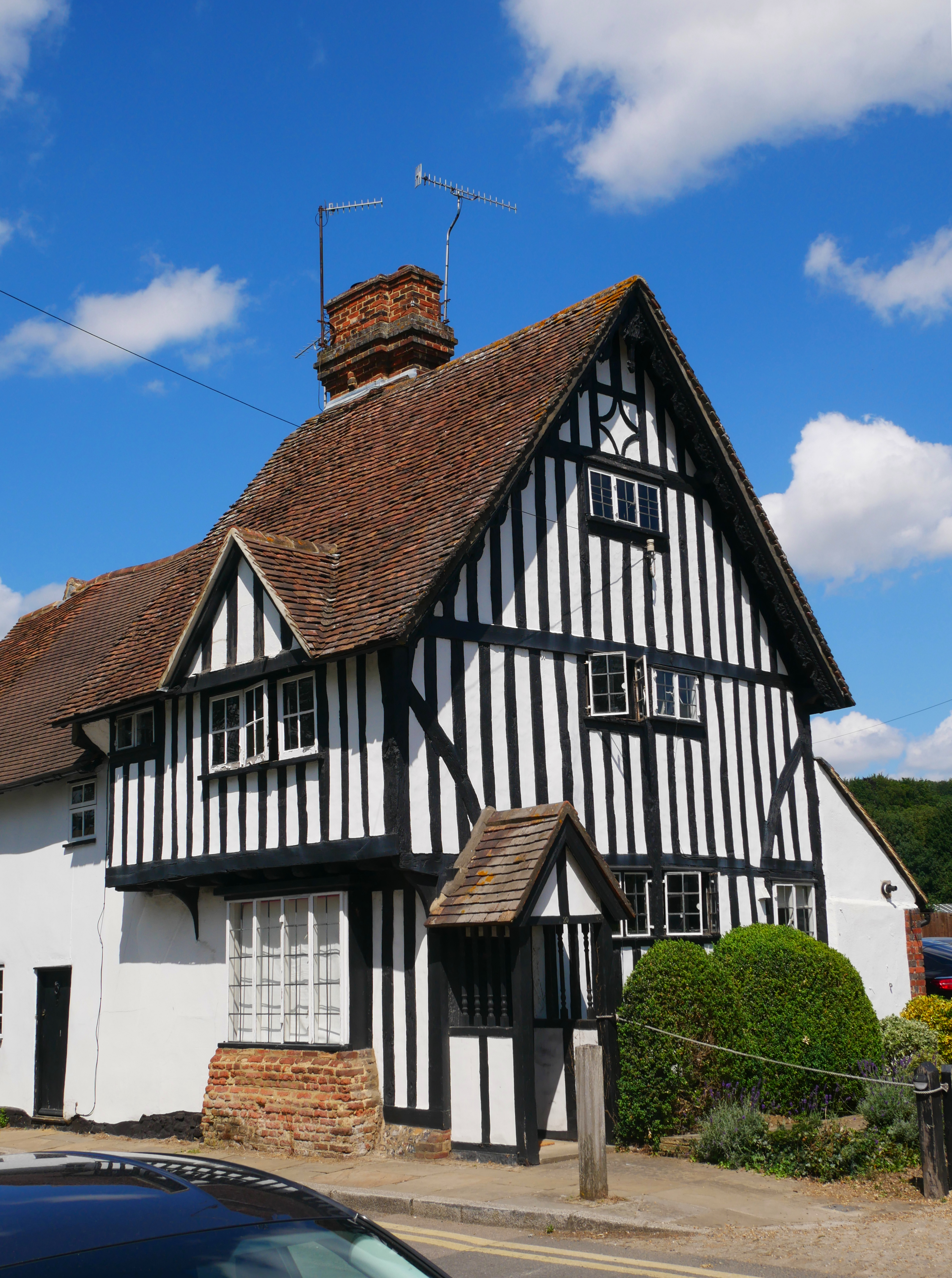
The Tudor Cottage in Eynsford

Another famous resident was Arthur Mee who built and lived in Eynsford Hill, a grand house overlooking the village. Mee edited both the weekly Children's Newspaper and the Children's Encyclopaedia, in which the design and construction of Eynsford Hill was chronicled. Whether the name of Eliza Doolittle's husband Freddy Eynsford-Hill in George Bernard Shaw's Pygmalion is connected to the house is a matter of conjecture.

The village was scandalised in the 1920s by the antics of composers E.J. Moeran and Peter Warlock who rented a house there; Warlock's habit of riding his motorbike round the village naked was matched by his housemate's singing sea shanties on a Sunday morning to try to drown out the congregation in the Baptist chapel next door. Although the time spent in Eynsford was productive for Warlock, Moeran never really recovered.

Graham Sutherland lived for many years in the 17th century Willow Cottage opposite the old village school.

The parish was part of Axstane Hundred and later Dartford Rural District.

=== Eynsford Castle ===
Dating from 1088, Eynsford Castle is one of the most complete Norman castles in England. Ransacked in the 14th century, it fell into decay. For years it was used as dog kennels by the Hart-Dyke family of nearby Lullingstone Castle. It is now in the care of English Heritage and open to the public.

=== Lullingstone Castle ===
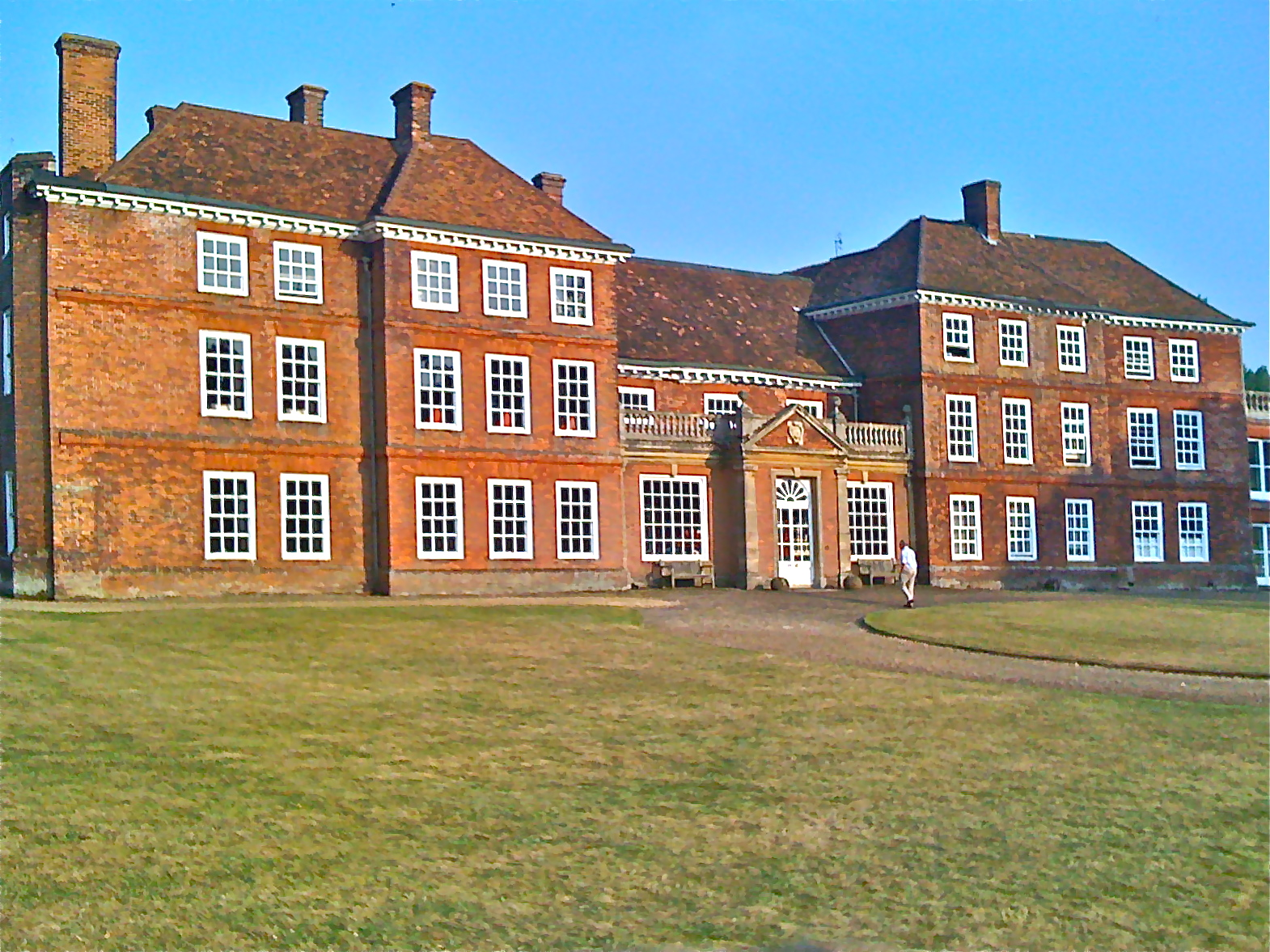
Lullingstone Manor

Not a true castle, but a manor house, built in the 15th century and substantially rebuilt in the 18th century by Sir Percyvall Hart in honour of Queen Anne, who often stayed there. In 1875 Sir William Hart-Dyke and two of his friends framed the rules of lawn tennis at Lullingstone and first played the game there, using a ladder supported on two barrels for a net. The silk farm that supplied Queen Elizabeth II with silk for her wedding dress was situated here, though by the time the Lullingstone Silk Farm provided Lady Diana Spencer with silk for hers, it had moved to Dorset.

In 2004 the current heir to the estate, Tom Hart Dyke, created the World Garden of Plants in the grounds from a design made in 2000 while he was held captive by rebels in Colombia. The 2-acre (0.81 ha) walled garden is laid out like a map of the world, containing some 10 000 species planted to create the shapes of their areas of origin. Both house and garden are open to the public, and the garden in 2005 won the British Guild of Travel Writers' 'Best UK Tourism Project' award.

=== Lullingstone Roman Villa ===
Lullingstone Roman villa was discovered in 1939, and contains some of the finest excavated remains of a Roman villa in Britain, including a Romano-Christian chapel.

=== Wildlife ===
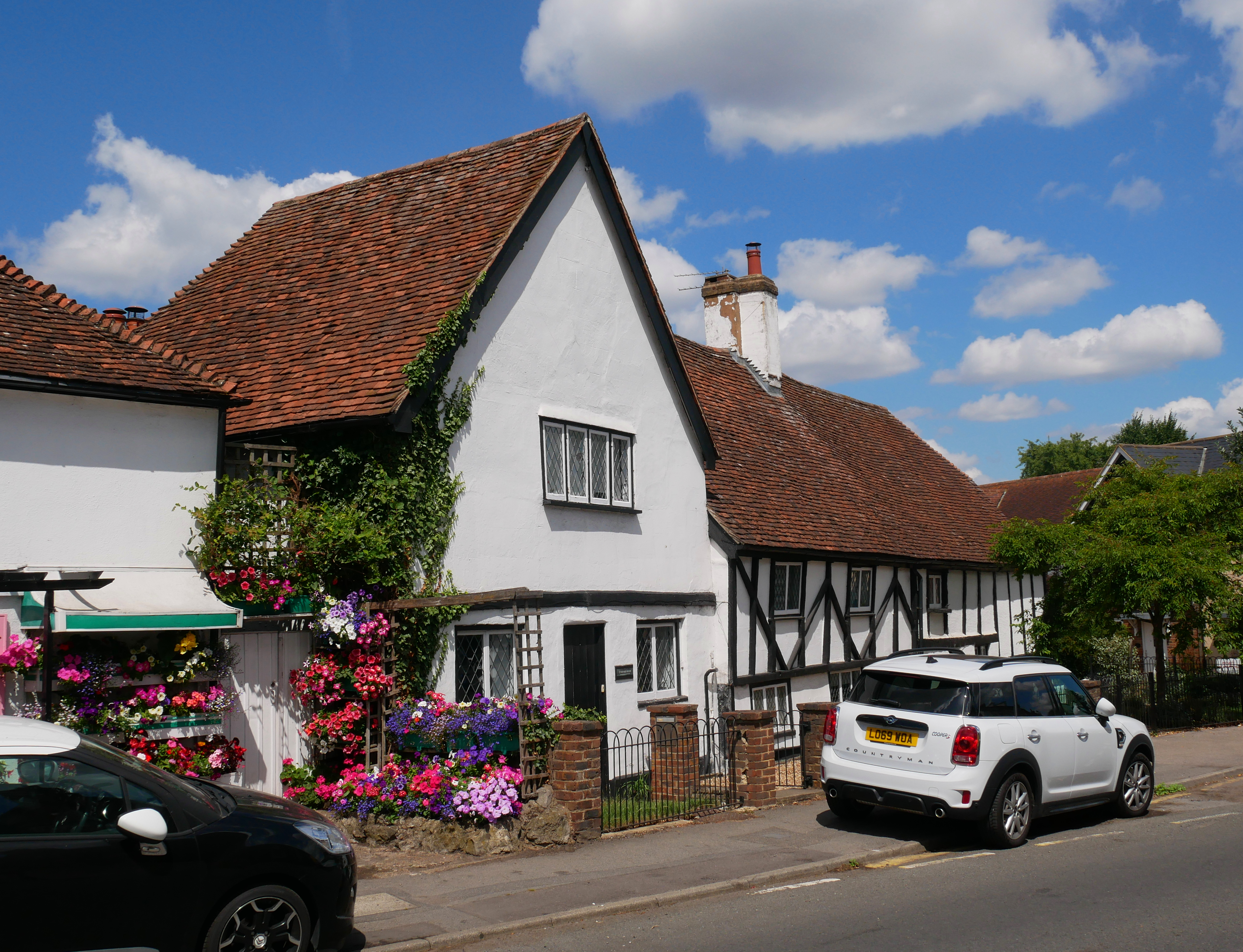
The seventeenth-century Eynsford House

The Eastern areas flanking the Darent were largely grazed and kept open from encroaching scrub and woodland up until the 1950s. The ensuing changes and scrub encroachment meant a loss of habitat for many downland butterfly species. This decline was repeated in the bird and reptile populations. Sterling clearance efforts ensued along Preston Hill and the flanks of Lower Austin Lodge, though without enough consistency to make a substantial difference. The shallower Western slopes of the Darent up to Lullingstone Golf Course still have a substantial diversity of butterflies and birds, the lockdown period on 2020 even encouraging quite unsuspected birds like the Wheatear to take up spring and summer residence.

== Eynsford on television ==
20 Miles from Piccadilly Circus consisted of six half-hour episodes about various aspects of life in the village. The show was released in 1994 and initially aired only in the Carlton Television region, although the first three episodes were later repeated on Channel 4.

Save Lullingstone Castle was a six-part series by Keo Films, aired between 4 April and 9 May 2006, on BBC2. It followed the fortunes of Tom Hart Dyke as he developed the World Map of Plants and attempted to thereby turn the fortunes of the estate. A second series, Return to Lullingstone Castle aired between 19 March and 23 April 2007.

In the movie Love Actually, the vicar at Eynsford church at the time played the vicar that married Juliet and Peter.

For ITV's 2021 comedy drama The Larkins, Eynsford featured as the fictional village of Littlechurch, and was used for a number of filming locations including The Village Hall, Castle Hotel, The Five Bells Pub and various spots around Eynsford Riverside and Ford.

== Eynsford Baptist Church ==
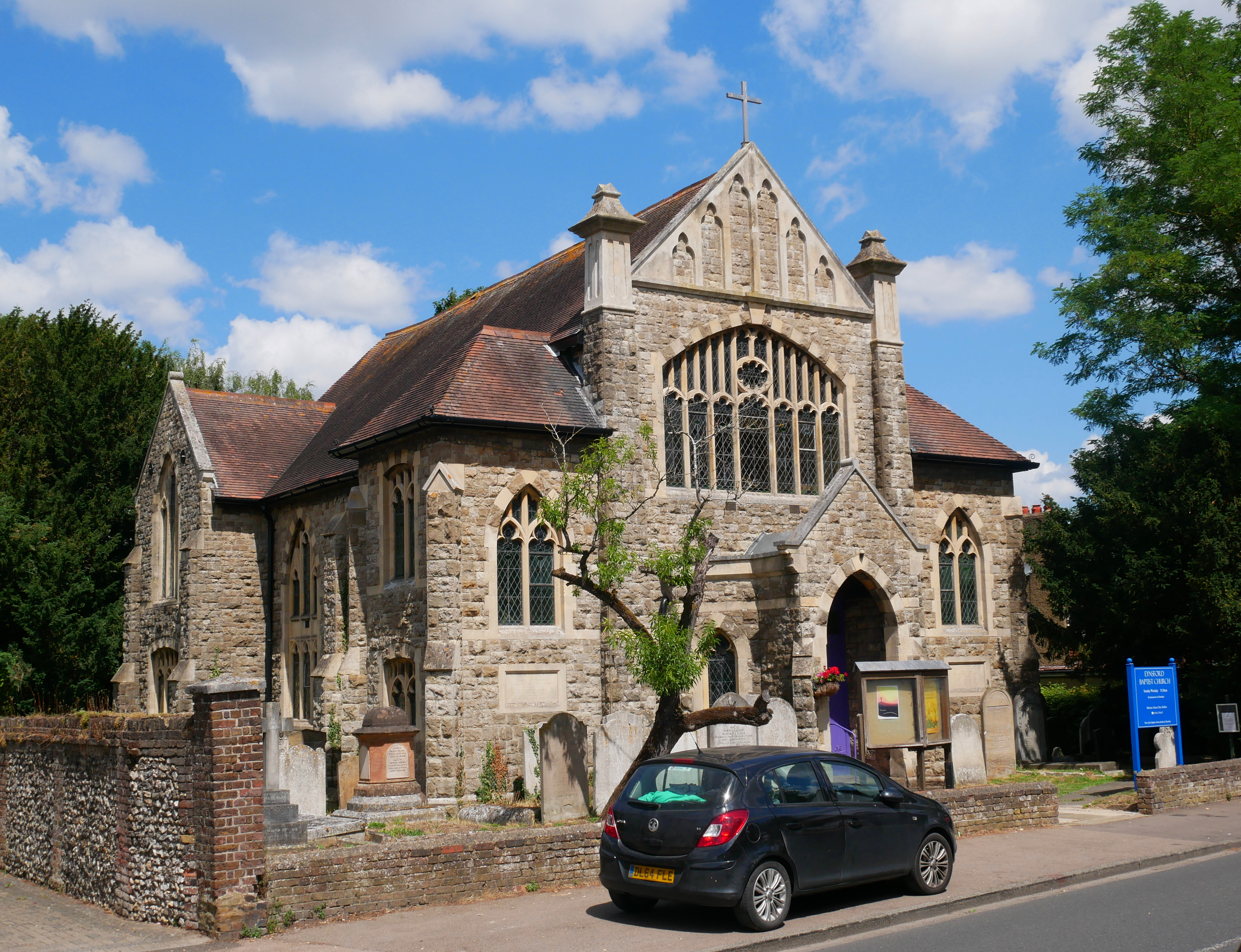
The Eynsford Baptist Church

In 1775, a Baptist preacher, Mr J. Morris, opened his house in Eynsford for the preaching of the Gospel. This was the beginning of a Baptist community.

The first building was completed in 1806, giving way to the present enlarged building in 1906.

== Transport ==
=== Rail ===
Eynsford station provides the village with National Rail services to London Blackfriars via Catford and to Sevenoaks.

=== Buses ===
Eynsford is served by Go-Coach route 2 to Sevenoaks and Swanley, with limited journeys on Mondays through Saturdays.

== See also ==
- List of places of worship in Sevenoaks (district)
- Listed buildings in Eynsford
- Lullingstone Country Park
- Eynsford travel guide from Wikivoyage
