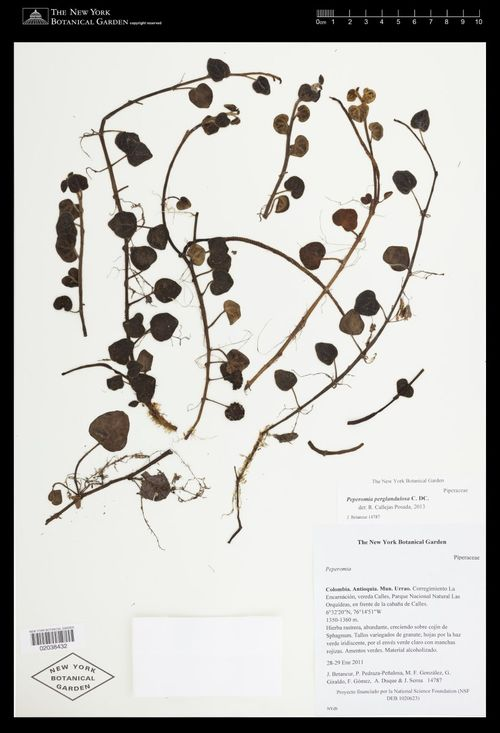

Scientific classification
- Kingdom: Plantae
- Clade: Tracheophytes
- Clade: Angiosperms
- Clade: Magnoliids
- Order: Piperales
- Family: Piperaceae
- Genus: Peperomia
- Species: P. perglandulosa

Binomial name
- Peperomia perglandulosa Yunck.

= Peperomia perglandulosa =

Species of flowering plant

Peperomia perglandulosa is a species of epiphyte in the genus Peperomia that is endemic in Colombia and Panama. It grows on wet tropical biomes. Its conservation status is Threatened.

== Description ==
The type specimen where collected near El Valle de Antón, Panama at an altitude of 1,100 meters (3,600 ft).

Peperomia perglandulosa is a creeping, succulent epiphytic herb with a stem 2 mm thick, densely covered with red hairs, rooting at the nodes, with internodes 2–5 cm or more long. The alternate leaves are deltoid-ovate with rounded apex and truncate base, mostly subpeltate with the petiole attached 1–2 mm from the margin, measuring 1.5–3 cm wide by 1.5–3 cm long. They are palmately 5-nerved with slender, obscure laterals, nearly hairless above, covered with fine hairs beneath at least along the midrib, with margin densely fringed with hairs and a zone of submarginal hairs on the upper surface. The leaves dry rather thick and opaque, densely and conspicuously red-glandular-dotted on both sides with comparatively large glands. The petiole is 1.5–4 cm long, densely red-hairy and sparsely red-glandular. The leaf-opposed spikes are 2 mm thick by 7 cm long, densely flowered, on peduncles 2.5 cm long that are densely red-hairy with scattered red glands and bracteate near the middle. The floral bracts are round-peltate, conspicuously and densely red-glandular. The ovary is ellipsoidal, red-glandular, sharply beaked, with stigma anterior at the base of the beak. Fruit was not present.

The densely red-villous stems and petioles, together with the conspicuously and densely red-glandular leaves, bracts, and ovary distinguish this species.

== Taxonomy and naming ==
It was described in 1950 by Truman G. Yuncker in Annals of the Missouri Botanical Garden 37, from specimens collected by Paul H. Allen. It got its name from description of the species, which literally translates to very glandular.

== Distribution and habitat ==
It is endemic in Colombia and Panama. It grows on a epiphyte environment and is a herb. In Colombia, its elevation range is 1,250–2,010 meters (4,100–6,590 ft). It grows on wet tropical biomes.

== Conservation ==
This species is assessed as Threatened, in a preliminary report.
