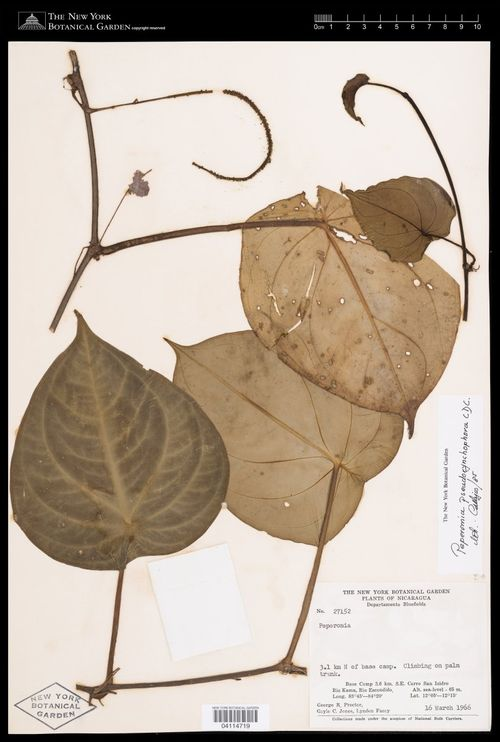

Scientific classification
- Kingdom: Plantae
- Clade: Tracheophytes
- Clade: Angiosperms
- Clade: Magnoliids
- Order: Piperales
- Family: Piperaceae
- Genus: Peperomia
- Species: P. flexinervia

Binomial name
- Peperomia flexinervia Yunck.

= Peperomia flexinervia =

Species of flowering plant

Peperomia flexinervia is a species of perennial or epiphyte in the genus Peperomia that is endemic in Nicaragua and Panama. It grows on wet tropical biomes. Its conservation status is Not Threatened.

== Description ==
The type specimen where collected in Coclé, Colombia.

Peperomia flexinervia is a creeping, succulent, terrestrial herb that is essentially hairless, with a stem 3 mm thick when dry, rooting at the nodes and described as "densely pink-spotted", with internodes 6–10 cm (2.4–3.9 in) or more long. The alternate leaves are round-ovate with an attenuately sharp-acuminate apex and base rounded to cordate, peltate within 15 mm of the margin, measuring 7–9 cm (2.8–3.5 in) wide by 12–15 cm (4.7–5.9 in) long. They are rather prominently 7- to 9-nerved from the petiole, with the lateral nerves strongly curving toward the apex and the innermost pair slightly joining with the midrib which is faintly branched upward. The leaves are hairless, yellow-glandular-dotted, densely fringed with hairs along the margin, drying firm, somewhat opaque, and finely pellucid-dotted. The petiole reaches up to 16 cm (6.3 in) or more long. The axillary spikes are up to 20 cm (7.9 in) or more long, solitary or sometimes multiple, on a 1- or 2-bracted stalk up to 10 cm or more long; the bracts are 2 cm or more long, narrowly lanceolate. The floral bracts are round-peltate. The ovary is ovoid with a beak, the stigma positioned at the base of the beak. Fruit was not developed at the time of description.

It resembles P. parmata but differs in its creeping habit and venation type; from P. maculata it differs especially in leaf shape and venation pattern.

== Taxonomy and nming ==
It was described in 1950 by Truman G. Yuncker in Annals of the Missouri Botanical Garden 37, from specimens collected by Paul H. Allen. It got its name from description of the species, which literally means curved nerves.

== Distribution and habitat ==
It is endemic in Nicaragua and Panama. It grows on a perennial or epiphyte environment and is a herb. It grows on wet tropical biomes.

== Conservation ==
This species is assessed as Not Threatened, in a preliminary report.
