= Abel A. Hunter =

American botanist (1877–1935)

Abel Aken Hunter
- Born: September 17, 1877; Lincoln, Nebraska, US
- Died: April 6, 1935 (aged 57); Panama Canal Zone
- Education: University of Nebraska (Botany)
- Occupations: Botanist, Postmaster, Manager
- Known for: Collector of Orchids of Panama

Abel Aken Hunter (September 18, 1877 – April 6, 1935) was an American botanist that collected and cataloged Panamanian orchids and a member of orchid hunting expeditions. From 1915 to 1935, Hunter traveled with well-known collectors and researchers at the time such as: Charles Powell, George Pring, Carroll Dodge, Julian Steyermark, and Paul Allen. Hunter and Allen's herbarium specimens, found in the Oakes Ames Herbarium at Harvard University, include four new species.

== Early life ==
Born in Lincoln, Nebraska, to Mary Abba (née Crooker) and Joseph H. Hunter, Abel was the third-born of four children. Around 1870, Joseph Hunter opened a law practice in Mendota, Illinois. There he met and married Mary Crooker. After the birth of their daughter, Alice Cushman Hunter (1874), the pioneer family moved 400 miles west to Lincoln, Nebraska, where Walter David (1875), Abel Aken (1877), and Joseph Slayton Hunter (1879) were born. In 1880, the U. S. Federal Mortality Schedule documented Joseph H. Hunter's death as caused by typhoid fever. In a biography of Abel's older brother, Walter David Hunter (entomologist), the Hunter children were mentioned: "He [Walter] and the other children in the family were apparently born naturalists, for they knew all the birds and many of the plants and insects around Lincoln". On January 3, 1893, Hunter (age 15) was appointed to the United States Postal Service (USPS), while studying for a higher education.

While attending the University of Nebraska, Hunter studied botany and was appointed by the Board of Regents as a plant collector in 1898. That same year, Hunter, along with George G. Hedgcock, submitted a paper "Thorea" after discovering a rare seaweed (Thorea ramosissima Bory) in Lancaster County, Nebraska. By 1900, Hunter had left the university's employment and began working full-time for the USPS. The May 4, 1901 issue of the Nebraska State Journal reported that: "A. A. Hunter, who has for several years been doing work in the department of botany, has accepted a position [with the USPS] in Grand Island [Nebraska]."

== Family life and career, fraternal organizations ==
On July 24, 1901, in North Platte, Nebraska, Hunter married Mary A. Dixon (1875-1963); they had one son, Raymond Dixon Hunter (1902-1928). In 1905 Hunter's annual salary with the USPS was $700. He was promoted to mail order clerk on January 1, 1906; in July, Hunter transferred to Panama. By working in Gorgona, in the Canal Zone, his salary jumped to $1,500 per year. He worked for the USPS for the next 29 years, ultimately receiving the post-mastership at Balboa.

Fraternal organizations

Hunter was an active member of two service organizations. Back in 1909, at the lodge institution of the Knights of Pythias, he was recorded as a prelate. In Gorgona, at the January 16, 1912, meeting of the IOOF (International Order of Odd Fellows) Isthmian Canal Lodge No. 1, after having been elected by the membership, he was installed as the Noble Grand, the highest officer position.

== Orchid collection ==
=== Early Hunts ===
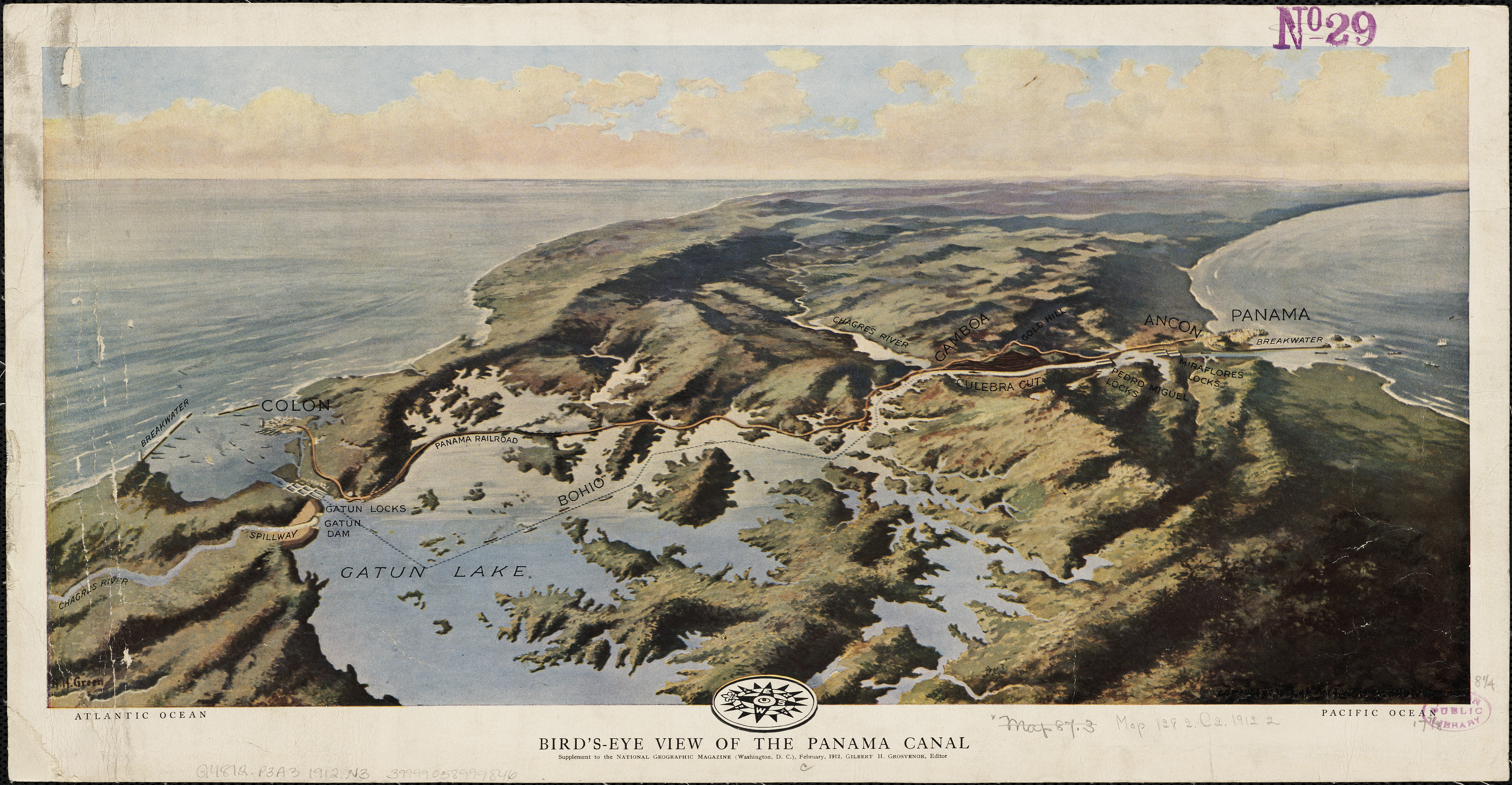
Gatun Lake 1912

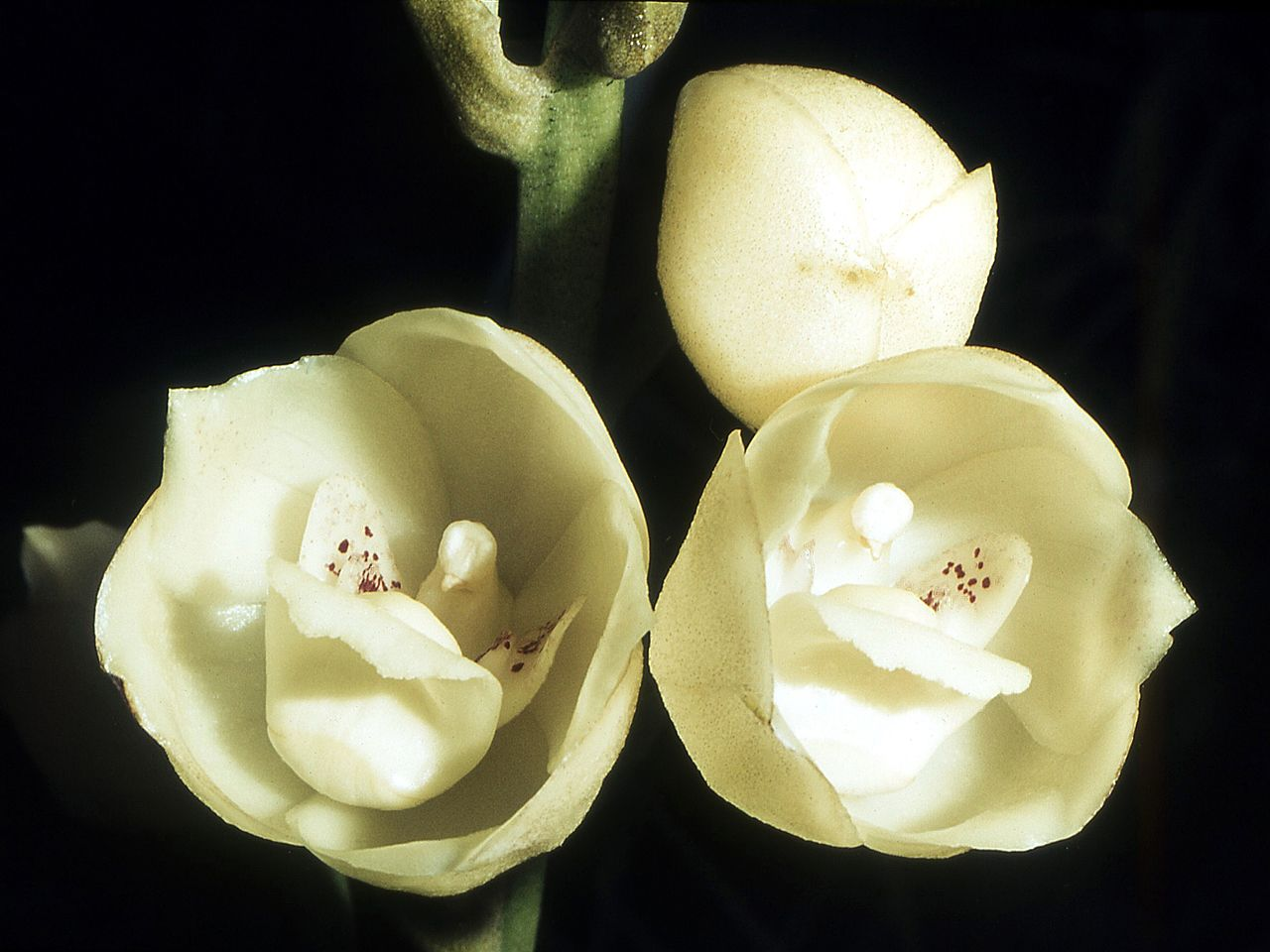
Dove orchid

In 1910, Charles Powell, a dispensary nurse, transferred to Gorgona where Hunter was working. Although Powell was 23 years older than Hunter, a friendship took root between the two men, one that would last roughly 17 years. About 1912, as Gatun Lake filled (part of the construction plan for the Panama Canal), Powell and Hunter purchased a motor boat for fishing; there they discovered dove orchids growing upon the tops of some of the thousands of water-inundated trees. Hunter exclaimed:

"Look, Powell–orchids! Oodles of orchids! Treefuls of orchids! Let's get some of 'em."

Instead of fish, they brought, "A boat-load of orchids back to Gorgona where they were disseminated over the Canal Zone, the United States, and Europe." About 1913 or 1914, canal work in Gorgona would end; Hunter and Powell transferred to Balboa. In late 1915, Powell started what would eventually become a globally-known orchid garden.

=== Hunting with Powell ===
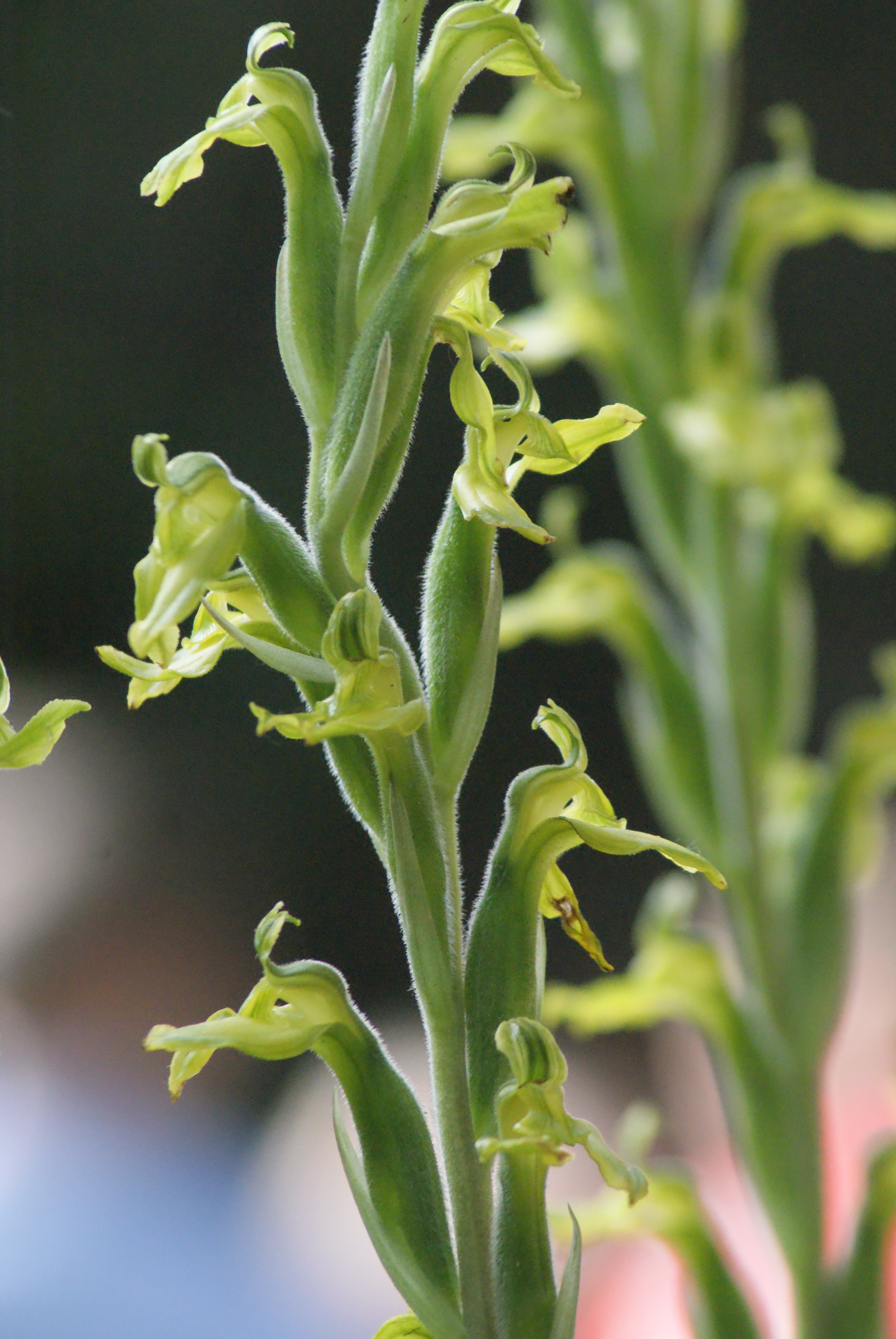
Sarcoglottis hunteriana Schlechter dedicated to Hunter

Hunter and Powell coordinated their leave periods to hunt in remote Panamanian localities; they made collecting trips to the Chiriquí Province in 1918, 1920, and 1922. In 1918, Powell started submitting pressed, mounted, documented orchid specimens to researchers: first to R. Allen Rolfe in England, then to Rudolf Schlechter in Germany. As Rolfe died before completing his study of Powell's specimens, Schlechter took up documenting their taxonomy. In 1922, Schlechter published Orchidaceae Powellianae Panamenses, a 95-page study of Powell's orchids, naming five species after Hunter. In March 1925, Hunter and Powell went on a collecting trip to the Santa Fe in Veraguas Province.

=== Hunting with Pring ===
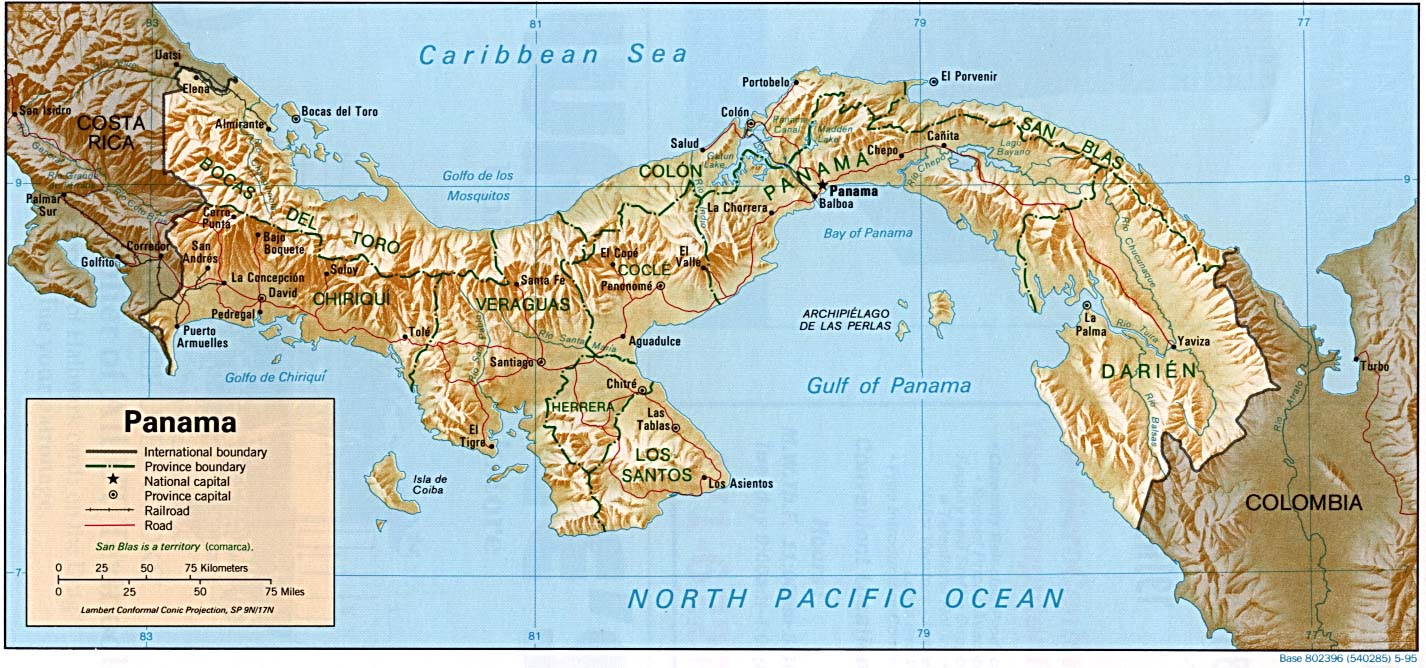
Expedition to Chirqui via Bay of Panama to Pedregal

In March 1927, George Harry Pring, Horticulturist to the Missouri Botanical Garden (MBG), made a trip to the Canal Zone; he and Hunter made arrangements for a month-long expedition in the Chiriqui region. Due to his advanced age, Powell stayed in Balboa to receive their orchid shipments. Hunter and Pring's mission was to collect orchids to supplement the ones found at the newly created the MBG's Tropical Station. They booked passage on a cattle boat to travel from Panama Bay to Port Pedregal. After a thirty-four-hour voyage, and a delay due to tides, the men finally arrived in southwest Panama; continuing on, they arrived in David, Chiriquí for the night. Traveling an additional thirty miles by "motor", climbing from an altitude of 500 feet to 3800 feet, they reached their base of operations in Boquete, Chiriquí: a prime habitat for orchids. Their search area covered a radius of twenty miles. Pring reported: "To obtain varied genera and new species it is necessary to climb the 'barrancas' [steep, rocky slopes], ford streams, cut one's way through the jungle, and hunt for the coveted orchid, and it is truly a hunt. Hunter's sharp eyes detected almost everything within range."

Orchids found in trees too tall to climb were removed by the use of a fork-top sapling cut on site. When the plants were within reach a machete was used to separate the orchid plant from the tree. At times, the men would dismount and tie up their horses to search deeper in the dense jungle. The first week they collected 75 plants of Odontoglossum powellii.

Hoping to find a rare, epiphytic species (chinela), they contacted A. Guterriez, a coffee plantation owner in Palo Alto, who reported he had not seen one in years. He furnished a guide who took the men to a tract where most of the trees had been cut down in preparation for a coffee plantation. Disappointed after collecting with no luck, Pring observed what he thought to be a Maxillaria. He climbed the tree and came down with the plant in his mouth. Upon further examination he discovered he had found the coveted chinela. Pring wrote: "In my excitement I forgot my guide and rushed to tell Hunter, 'I've found it, I've found it.'" They feverishly combed all the fallen trees and collected thirty good specimens. Pring added: "Such a clearing is undoubtedly the orchid collector's paradise."

Traveling along the Caldera River, they set their sights on locating a Mormodes; Hunter having found them there on previous trips. They came upon a large half-rotten tree and Hunter remarked, "Here's where we'll find them if we are in luck." They found six.

The swan orchid, genus Cycnoches, and the monk's hood orchid, genus Catasetum, were next to be located by the pair. A guide was arranged to take them to the llano (a treeless, grassy plain) at Caldera but he was unavailable. They decided to go on without him; but not before buying some emergency provisions. After riding 4 1/2 hours, they realized they had missed the trail; after some backtracking and three more hours in the saddle they reached their planned destination. At breakfast the next day, the men were discussing the hunt for the Cycnoches. Catasetums were observed within easy reach. Hunter noticed a plant stuck in the tree just outside the house they were staying at and brought it to Pring's attention - by the end of the day, twelve excellent plants had been collected.

The Volcán Barú

Upon arrival on the southwest side of the volcano, another coffee plantation owner, T. B. Moeniche, knew of several promising places for orchids and offered his guide, Emiliano. Despite these finds, difficult terrain slowed their expedition. Deciding that they were satisfied with their findings, they returned to Boquete and packed their plants for shipment. Next, they travelled thirty miles to David on the other side of the volcano and took a train to Concepcion. After an 8 1/2 horseback ride to an elevation of 5800 feet, they collected several hundred plants, shipping them via mule-pack train to Concepcion.

Return to Balboa

The expedition was cut short due to Pring experiencing a mild attack of dysentery.

Pring reported the collection results: "In all, we had collected about 126 species of plants embracing 58 genera, and there are still 12 kinds of plants unidentified."

=== American Orchid Society's Third Annual National Orchid Show ===
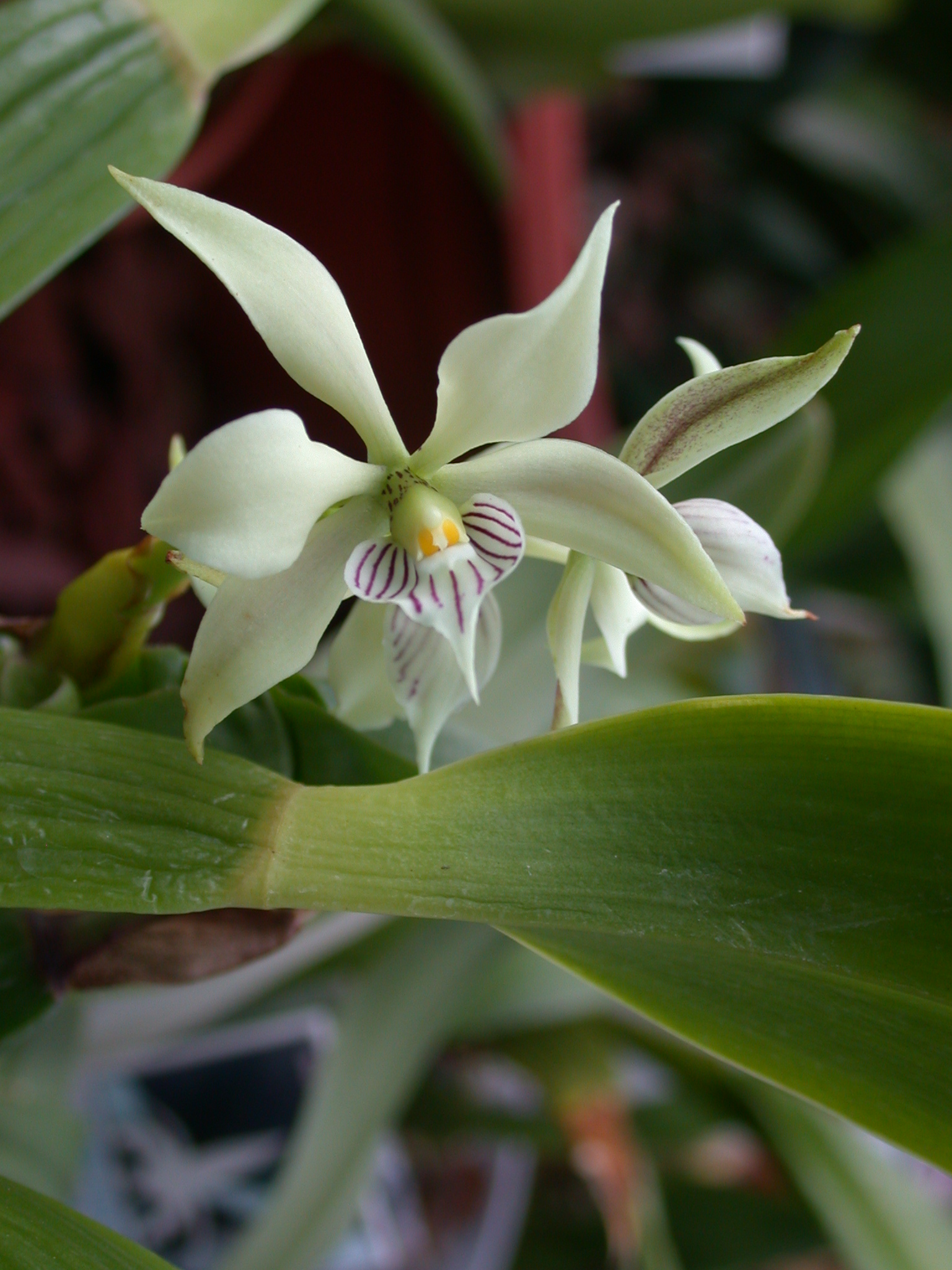
Epidendrum fragrans in Hunter's display at American Orchid Society's exhibition

On April 29, 1928, The Brooklyn Daily Eagle (Brooklyn, New York) ran an article by Anthony Muto titled "Rare Panama Orchids on way to Brooklyn Botanic Garden." A synopsized version of Muto's report follows: "Eight cases of orchids including 35 varieties of rare Panamanian specimens, which will eventually form the nucleus of an orchid collection at the Brooklyn Botanic Garden, are now en route to New York for the national exhibition of the American Orchid Society. These rare flowers were collected at great risk in the jungle regions of Panama. A. A. Hunter, director of the Missouri Botanical Garden's tropical station in Balboa, personally supervised the collecting and preparing of the specimens. More than a year of patient and extremely difficult work was needed to complete the collection. Collectors had to brave the perils of the jungles. Mr. Hunter carefully transplanted them on logs. Some were placed in baskets. Many of the specimens are not yet in bloom and Mr. Hunter, who is accompanying the collection to New York, hopes they will flower during the exhibition. Among the varieties included in the collection are the dove orchid, the yellow butterfly, bucket orchid, Christmas orchid, Lady of the Night, 'monkey face' orchid, and Epidendrum fragrans." On May 11, 1928, The Brooklyn Daily Eagle (Brooklyn, New York) reported on the three-day Third Annual National Orchid Show held at Madison Square Garden: "A mile of orchids, representing every known variety and worth more than $1,000,000 may be seen in the exhibit." Hunter's display was described thusly: "Another extraordinary collection in the show was brought from the jungles of Central America by A. A. Hunter of Balboa, Panama."

=== The 1934-35 collecting teams: Dodge, Steyermark, Hunter and Allen ===
Madden Lake (now Lake Alajuela) was created by the construction of Madden Dam as part of the Panama Canal watershed management. Similar to the orchid collection opportunity afforded by the creation of Gatun Lake, a unique opportunity for orchid collecting in "a drowned jungle" occurred again, prompting a need for a botanical expedition. In November 1934, George Moore, director of the MBG, sent researchers Carroll William Dodge (to lead the expedition), Julian Steyermark and Paul Allen (apprentice) to collect with Hunter (working at the Tropical Station). The trip was financed by the Science Research Fund of Washington University in St. Louis in cooperation with the MBG. Allen remained several weeks longer; he and Hunter were to collect in the Coclé Province (working over the Continental Divide from Penonomé to the Atlantic Slope). Hunter's name appears on 740+ specimen submissions from different combinations of collection teams; the herbarium specimens are found mainly in the MBG's herbarium (MO) and are found in its virtual herbarium database (Tropicos).

Finding the long-sought prize, Sobralia powellii

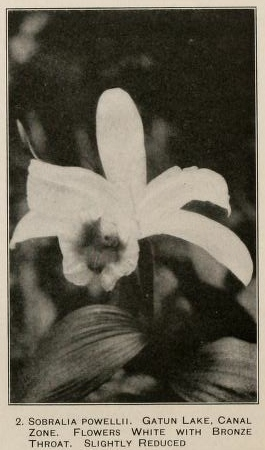
Sobralia powellii native home found by Hunter and Allen

The native home of the Sobralia powellii was unknown, so the collection team of Hunter and Allen set out to find it. A description of the Sobralia powellii is found in Powell's herbarium specimen's field notes: "Flowers white, with a bronze throat, bordered with cherry shading." Hunter suspected it would be found in the jungle near the head-waters of the Rio Boqueron. On the second day, traveling by native dugout (cayuca), the men encounter numerous violent squalls. Poles were cut to drive the cayuca up through "boiling rapids" costing another half-day of time but allowing the men to reach an absolutely unexplored region. The next day violent tropical rain continued non-stop. Their guide made a trail through the jungle and the men followed having to portage their equipment while struggling to move forward along "slippery clay ridges or through fast streams." Upon reaching the river at this point, they found it flowing through canyon-like gorges. Collecting had been poor; the men were discouraged. Having spent too much time in its search, they decided to give up. Finding themselves at the brink of a pool, drenched from the rain and needing a break, Allen jump into the pool fully clothed. In his report of the remainder of the experience, Allen wrote: "Climbing out [of the pool] on the opposite side my astonished gaze was met by a plant with great milky white buds nearly ready to open. The long-sought prize, Sobralia powellii, had been found. Its native home was no longer a mystery. After searching feverishly the surrounding territory, three more plants were found, so there are now about a dozen plants of this rare orchid at the Tropical Station and one small plant at the Arboretum at Gray Summit."

An image of the native home of the Sobralia powellii collecting area is hosted online by Missouri Digital Heritage, courtesy of the Missouri Botanical Garden.

The intense collecting done by Hunter and Allen resulted in the discovery of no less than four new species:

- Epidendrum cocleense Ames, Hubb. & Schw. (Hunter & Allen 389)
- Masdevallia tenuissima C. Schweinf. (Hunter & Allen 587)
- Ornithocephalus cochleariformis C. Schweinf. (Hunter & Allen 383)
- Pleurothallis rotundata C. Schweinf. (Hunter & Allen 561).

Examples of Hunter and Allen's herbarium specimens

Nine distinct specimens can be found at Harvard University's Herbarium (AMES).

For Masdevallia tenuissima C. Schweinf. #587

For Pleurothallis rotundata C. Schweinf. #561

During this expedition period, Hunter and Allen collected roughly 6,000 plants. Before they could accomplish their objectives in Panama, Hunter unexpectedly died; Allen continued hunting without him into May 1935.

=== The Tropical Station ===
Beginning with a 7,000-plant garden donated by Charles Powell in 1926, the Missouri Botanical Garden created its Tropical Station in Balboa, Panama with Powell was its first director. Abel A. Hunter succeeded Powell in 1928 - under his directorship, the Tropical Station was able to continued to operation despite the Great Depression; plant collecting continued and the exhibit was recognized as "one of the show places on the Canal Zone." Hunter managed the Tropical Station for roughly seven years until his death in April 1935; his wife Mary took over the management of the Tropical Station until a replacement was found in late 1936.

== Recognition ==
=== For USPS work ===
In 1908, Abel A. Hunter was awarded the Roosevelt Medal for two years of continuous distinguished civilian work as an employee of the Isthmian Canal Commission (employees of the Panama Railroad Company were also eligible). Over the next six years he received three service bars (third bar awarded on July 30, 1914). Of roughly 50,000 workers, only 519 medalists earned the medal with three bars only. Hunter's service record in the Canal Zone's Government and Sanitation department succinctly documents his USPS work.

=== For field work ===
While roaming the countryside of his youth, Hunter was intrigued by the natural world around him. He focused his studies at the state university on botany. In 1898 he co-published a paper on a rare seaweed discovered in Nebraska and worked for the University of Nebraska as a plant collector. Once established in Panama he returned to nature through fishing, which led to a friendship with Powell and over two decades of scientifically significant orchid collecting. His work with Powell led to Schlechter naming five new to science species in Hunter's honor. 750+ herbarium specimens bear his name as co-collector or collector with Dodge, Steyermark and Allen. With Allen, he contributed to the discovery of at least four new to science orchid species.

== Death and legacy ==
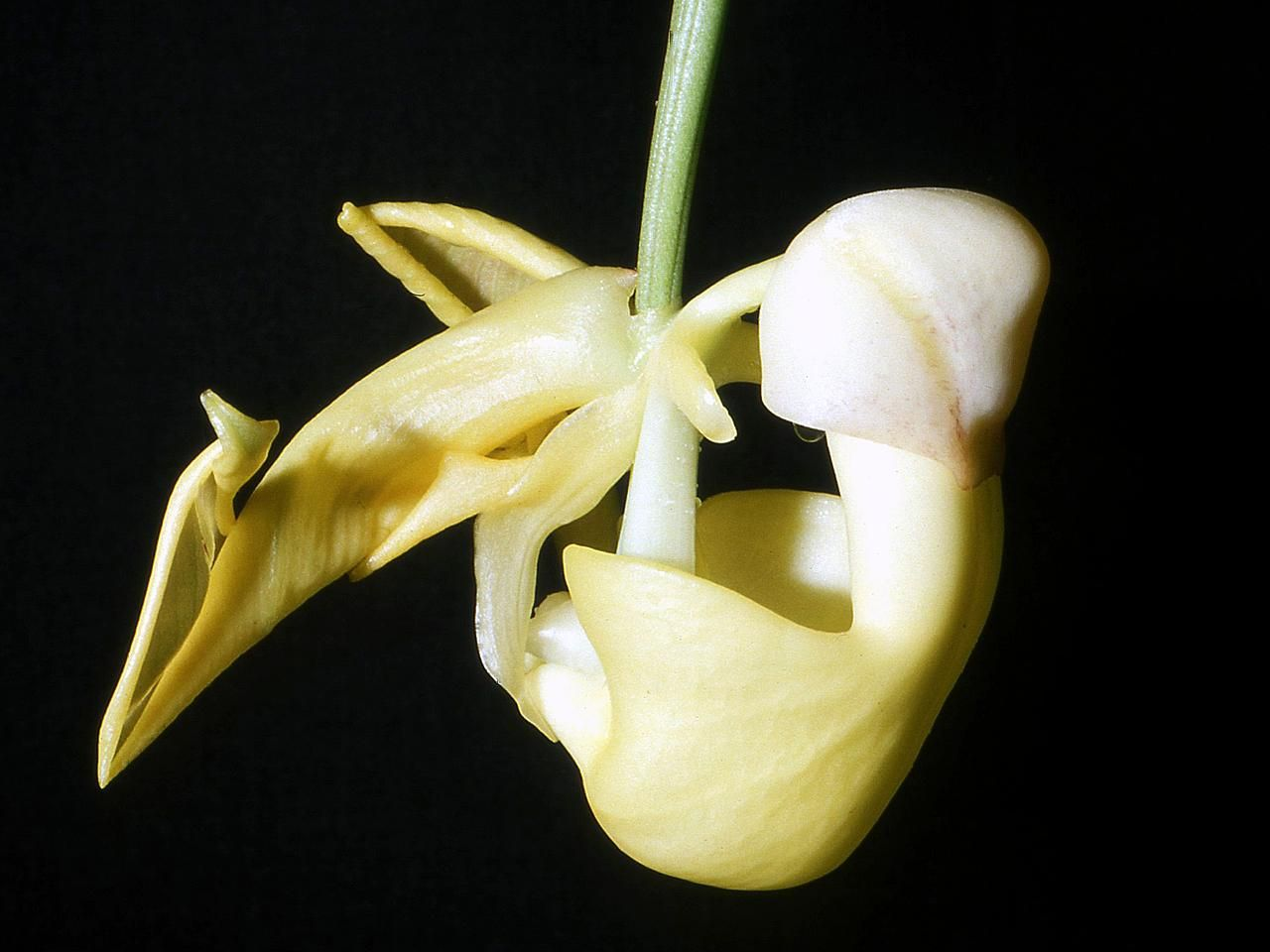
Coryanthes hunteriana

On April 6, 1935, at the age of 57, Abel A. Hunter died.

In Schlechter's Orchidaceae Powellianae Panamenses (Powell's Panama Orchids), five new species were dedicated to Hunter.

- Coryanthes hunteriana
- Encyclia hunteriana
- Epidendrum hunterianum
- Pleurothallis hunteriana
- Sarcoglottis hunteriana

== See also ==
- List of orchidologists
- The Plant List A worldwide, comprehensive, searchable database.
- Tropicos (Missouri Botanical Garden) A botanical database.
