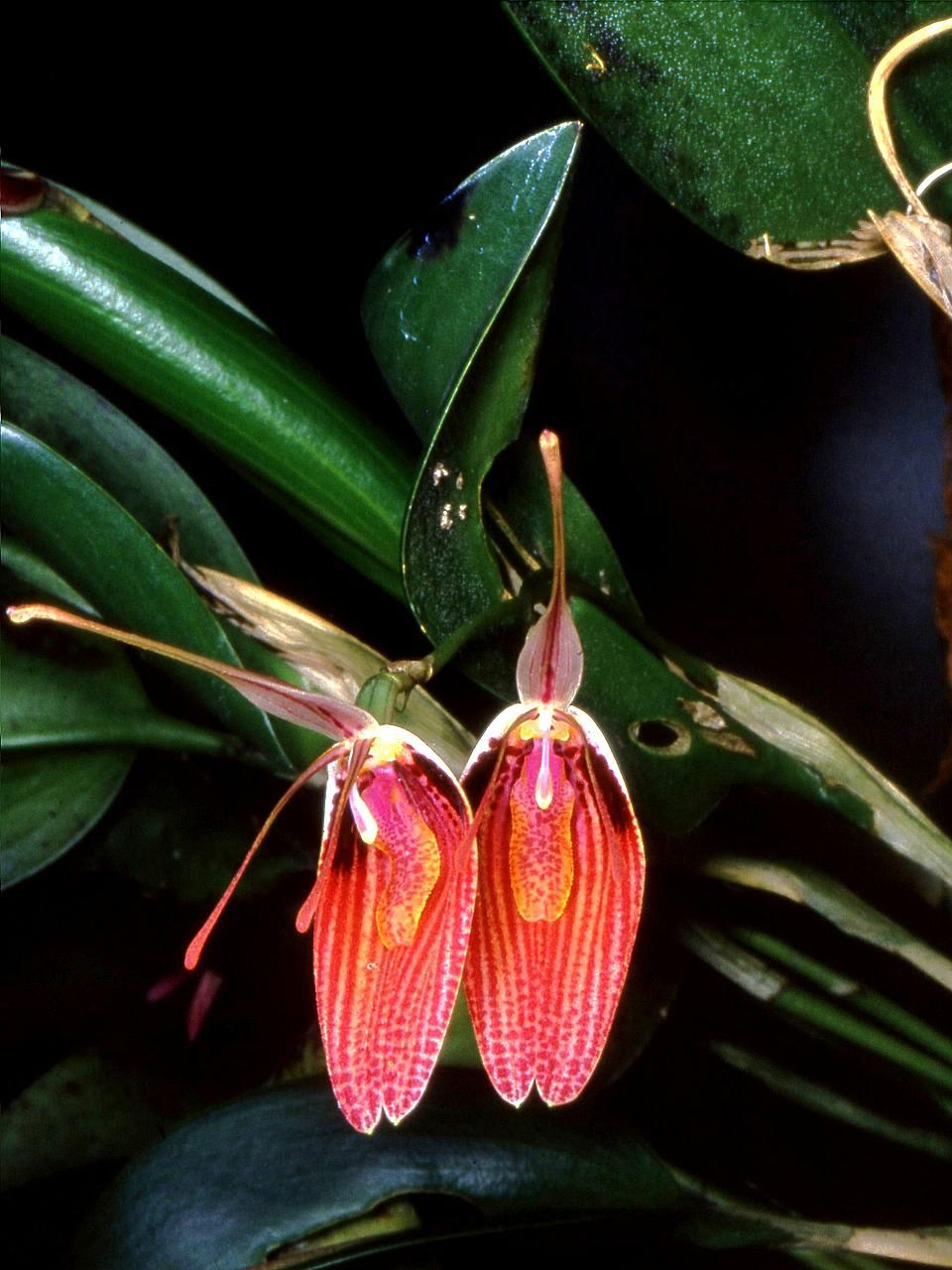
- Flower of Restrepia sanguinea

Scientific classification
- Kingdom: Plantae
- Clade: Tracheophytes
- Clade: Angiosperms
- Clade: Monocots
- Order: Asparagales
- Family: Orchidaceae
- Subfamily: Epidendroideae
- Genus: Restrepia
- Species: R. sanguinea

Binomial name
- Restrepia sanguinea Rolfe

Synonyms
- Restrepia antioquiensis Schltr.; Pleurothallis antioquiensis (Schltr.) P.H.Allen

= Restrepia sanguinea =

Species of orchid

Restrepia sanguinea, the blood red restrepia, is a species of orchid endemic to Venezuela.
