= Charles Wesley Powell =

American horticulturist (1854–1927)

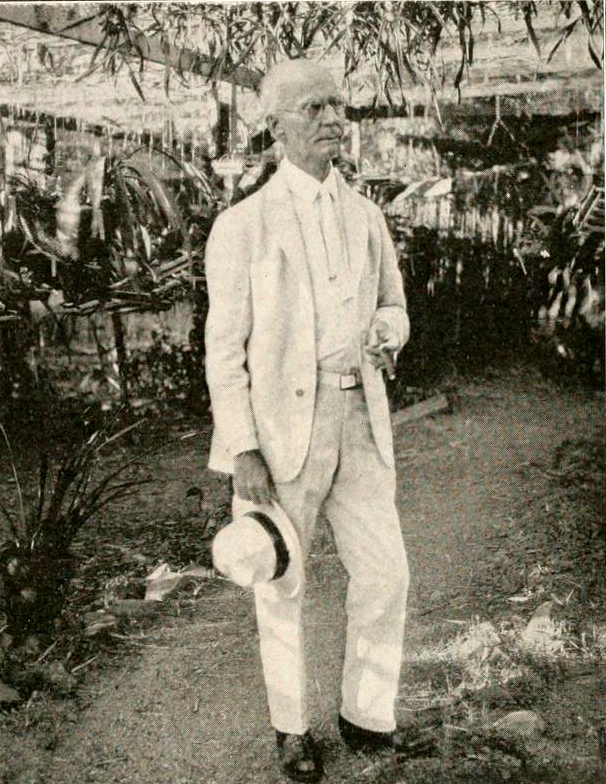
- Born: Charles Lesslie Pullen; May 5, 1854; Richmond, Virginia
- Died: August 18, 1927 (aged 73); Panama Canal Zone
- Education: Self-taught horticulturist
- Occupation(s): Bookkeeper, nurse, orchidologist
- Known for: Orchids of Panama-collection, documentation, donation

Charles Wesley Powell (May 5, 1854 – August 18, 1927) was an American hobbyist turned horticulturist specializing in the study of orchids (Orchidaceae). He is credited with providing scientists the first large-scale collection of orchid specimens found in Panama. In the early 1900s, he became internationally famous for his new discoveries and valuable contributions to orchidology by gathering, rediscovering, cultivating, preserving, documenting, and submitting-for-study a diverse assortment of hundreds of distinct specimens: yielding many new to science species.

Powell's specimen records (also known as herbarium specimens) and his Panama garden were studied by researchers at the Royal Botanical Gardens, the Berlin Botanical Garden, the Orchid Herbarium of Oakes Ames at Harvard University, the National Museum of Natural History at the Smithsonian Institution, and the Missouri Botanical Garden (MBG). Dozens of orchid species were named in his honor. In 1922, German botanist Rudolf Schlechter published his 95-page Orchidaceae Powellianae Panamenses (Panama orchid collections by C. Powell): principally on the basis of Powell's efforts. Powell's work remains relevant not only because his records document valuable scientific data, but they continue to provide material for study – many of his digitized herbarium specimens are freely available online via virtual herbaria.

In 1926, Powell donated his world-class orchid garden (orchidarium) to the renowned MBG of St. Louis, Missouri. Under Powell's direction, a Tropical Station was created by the MBG in Balboa, Panama; 7,000 plants from Powell's orchid garden populated the satellite operation. For the MBG, a snowball effect occurred in the tropics; orchid collecting began there in earnest and over the next 13 years, orchids from its Tropical Station would appreciably augment the collection of the parent garden in St. Louis. "Today, the Missouri Botanical Garden’s orchid collection represents one of the largest and finest in the United States."

== Early life ==
Ben K. Pullen, 1854

Known to orchid enthusiasts as C. W. Powell, he was born Charles Lesslie Pullen in Richmond, Virginia, to Benjamin King Pullen Sr. and Minerva "Minnie" Anner (née Smith) Pullen. He was the first-born of eight children. In a letter to Minnie dated July 29, 1854, from Richmond, Ben Pullen writes about his son:

Darling little Lesslie [as called in childhood; as spelled by father] I am so glad he is well and cries for his pa. Bless his pure little heart. 'Hush my baby don't you cry Your papa will come by ner bye.' I would walk a mile to see him this minute. Mrs Anderson + Letitia Rowe were in the store yesterday. They send a heap of love to you + Lesslie. [...] Affectionately Ben K. Pullen

In 1860, 6 year old Lesslie and his family moved, by train, 800 miles (1,300 km) southwest to Memphis, Tennessee, for the opening of his father's china store. Shortly thereafter, Lesslie was uprooted again when his family relocated 50 miles (80 km) south for several years. There they struggled to survive on a cousin's farm near Sardis, Mississippi, during the Union Army's occupation of Memphis in the American Civil War and Ben Pullen Sr.'s service as a Confederate Army officer. Perhaps this experience was Lesslie's introduction to agriculture.

== Family life, bookkeeper, book-lover, genealogist ==
1870s

After the War, the Pullens moved back to Memphis. In 1871, hard times in the South forced Lesslie's father to advertise his store's closing. By the mid-1870s, Ben Pullen Sr. was a bookkeeper for the State National Bank and Lesslie, now calling himself Charles, was a collector for the bank.

In 1877 he married Adelaide "Addie" Belle Prince (1858-1901), the daughter of a Mississippi antebellum cotton planter. In 1879, the couple's first child, Charles Lesslie was born (living only a few months). Six more children would follow: Bessie, an unnamed infant, David (died young), Adelaide "Addie", Minerva "Minnie", and Margaret. Bessie was born in 1880, and the couple's latter three daughters were born in 1887, 1891, and 1898 respectively.

The Yellow Fever Epidemic hit Memphis in 1878 claiming, among thousands, the life of Pullen's mother.

1880s

In the early 1880s, Pullen was appointed to serve Memphis in several leadership positions. Detail oriented, well-read, and popular, he served as Secretary of the Legislative Council of Memphis; Secretary of the Fire and Police Commissioners Board; and Clerk for the Supervisors of Public Works, earning $100 per month. Documenting the day-to-day business of a struggling city, he proved valuable to the citizens who put him in office. "Memphis began to recover quickly after [the Yellow Fever Epidemic of] 1878. Its artesian water supply was discovered and turned into one of the purest water supplies in the nation in the 1880s. Its charter was restored. Its sanitation and sewer systems became models for other cities." In 1885 he bought part-interest in a weekly paper The Sunday Times and was its business manager. He was not only a bookkeeper, but also a book-lover; Pullen collected rare books. His interests went beyond the literary world, however. He conducted exhaustive research on his Pullen and Smith genealogy. Relentless in his pursuit of ancestral names and important dates, he advertised for information throughout New England.

Notice to Town Clerks If every Town Clerk in the New England States who sees this notice, will examine the town Records of Births, Deaths, and Marriages, and will send me a copy therefrom of every entry of a Pullen birth, death or marriage, he may find; I will remit his fee bill for making copy, on receipt of same. Memphis, Tenn. Chas. L. Pullen.

— Magazine of New England History, 1891

1890s

Legal troubles plagued the Pullen family in 1890. By 1894, Pullen, his father, two brothers, a sister, and their families had moved 400 miles (640 km) south, settling in Houma and New Orleans, Louisiana. In 1895 he was bookkeeping for the Mutual Insurance Company in New Orleans, and his younger brother, Benjamin K. Pullen Jr., was a travel agent there.

1900s

In the 1900 U.S. Census, Pullen, his wife, and 4 daughters are found living in New Orleans. His father died in July of that year; his wife died shortly thereafter in February 1901. In 1902, Pullen's eldest daughter, Bessie, married Ernest Johnson and moved to Texas. His younger girls would be cared for by an aunt living in Central America. His daughter Minnie would marry Texan Joseph Ross, a railroad superintendent, and spend time in Guatemala where their second son was born in 1913. Addie married Charles Foster who worked throughout Central America and Jamaica. About his life in New Orleans and his budding interest in flowers he would say: "I had a little greenhouse in New Orleans before I went to the Canal Zone."

== New life: country, name, career, passion ==
=== Also known as (aka) Charles Wesley Powell ===
Some combination of events prompted a relatively unconnected Charles L. Pullen to move 1,600 miles (2,600 km) south to Panama. Exactly when and why he reinvented himself as Charles Wesley Powell is a mystery. In a 1928 biography of Powell, some elements of his pre-Panama days are not supported by facts: leading one to wonder why and by whom (probably Powell, for reasons best known by himself) the details of his life in the U. S. were altered. From 1907 to 1927 he would support himself by working in various positions in a Canal Zone dispensary (basic medical facility) or hospital. With a salary of $60 per month, he started out dispensing quinine (antimalarial drug) at a labor camp in old Gatun (now covered by 80 feet of rock and earth under Gatun Dam). It is not surprising he would be hired for a position in which precise record keeping was important. To better communicate with patients, he studied Spanish. Soon he was certified as a nurse. The front side of his employment record; immigration records in 1913 and 1926 (including addresses in the U.S. of daughter Bessie Johnson and the MBG); and the 1920 U.S. Census (including married daughter Addie in his household) find him using variations of the name Charles Wesley Powell.

"Pescadore Grande"

"In 1908 Powell transferred to Porto Bello [on the Caribbean Sea] as a dispensary assistant and took up fishing as a hobby, using a row-boat. Early 1910 finds Powell working in a dispensary in [old] Gorgona (now submerged 80 feet below the surface of Gatun Lake) and fishing in Panama Bay. The local fishermen called him 'Pescadore Grande' (great fisherman). Switching his fishing from Panama Bay to Gatun Lake soon followed."

=== "Look, Powell–Oodles of orchids!" ===
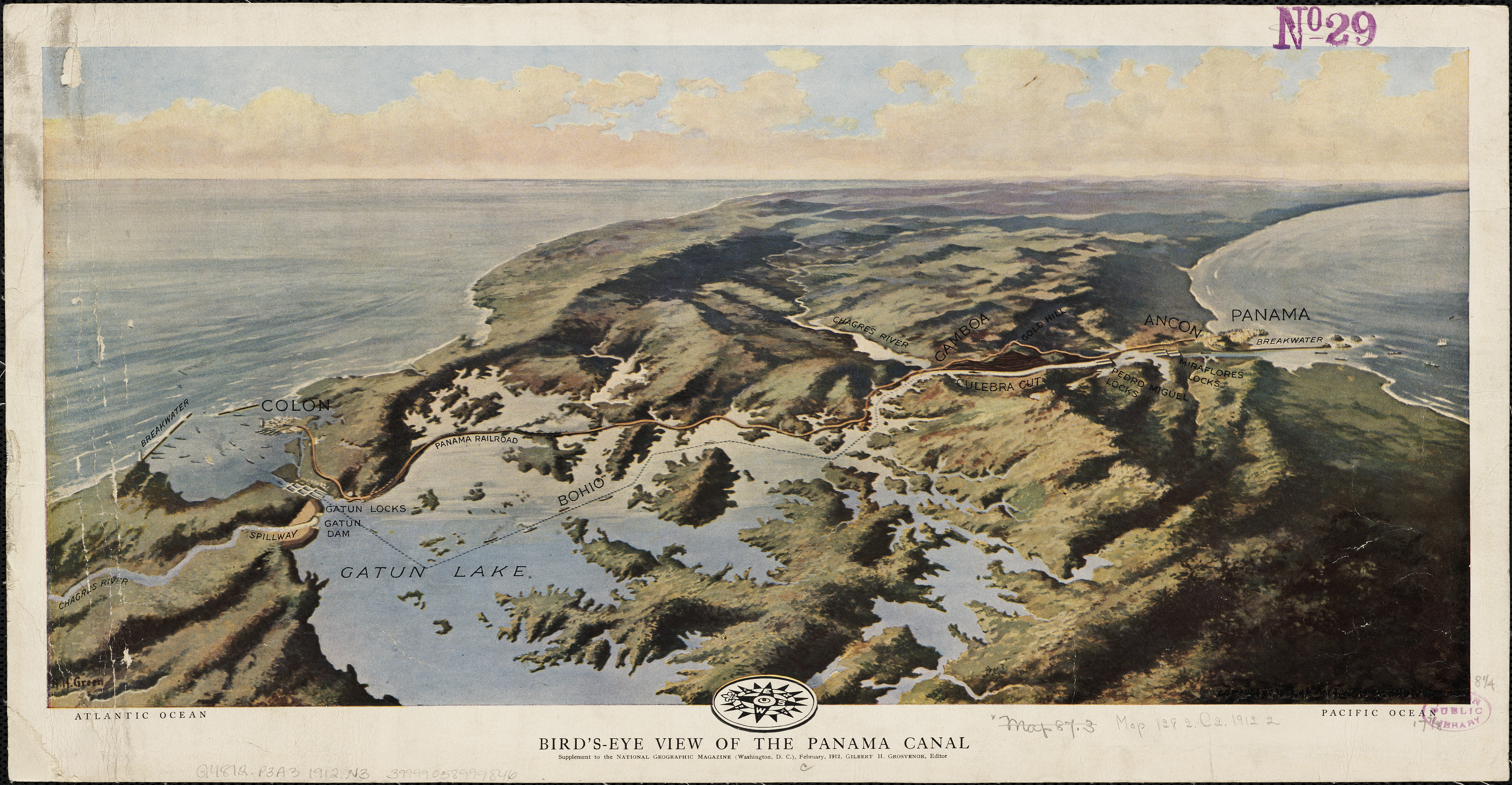
Gatun Lake 1912

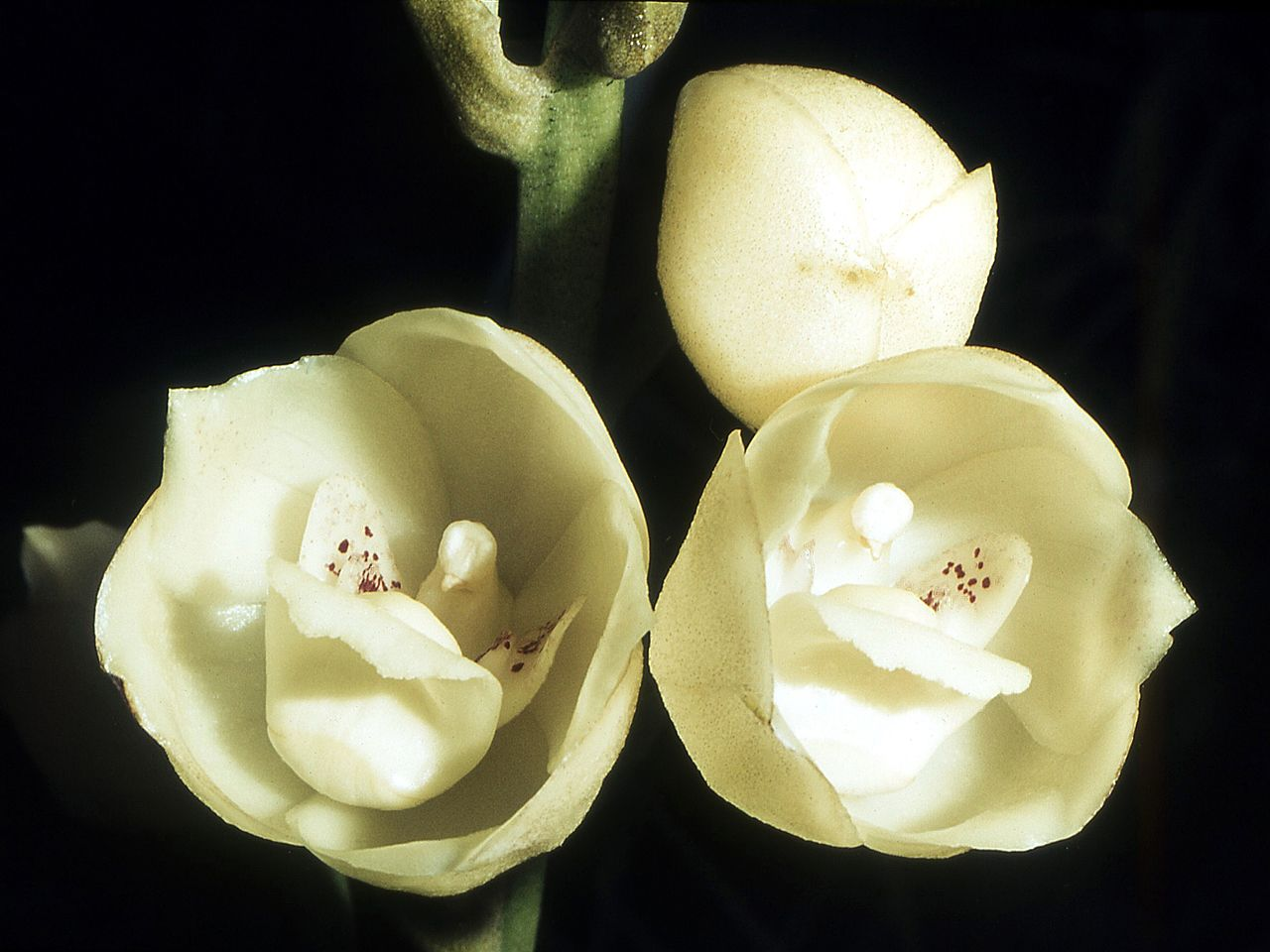
Dove orchid

The immense Gatun Lake, a part of the Panama Canal, was created when the U. S. Army Corps of Engineers dammed the Rio Chagres in the early 1900s. About 1912, Powell and his botanist friend Abel A. Hunter (1877-1935), bought a motor boat for fishing in the newly formed lake. "The waters had risen until they presented a surface through which the upper portions of thousands of tall trees protruded. Their craft cut paths between treetops. Hunter exclaimed, 'Look, Powell–orchids! Oodles of orchids! Treefuls of orchids! Let's get some of 'em.'" "The men knew the dove orchids would soon be submerged by the rising waters of the Chagres River. 'We were rewarded by a boat-load of the 'El Spirito Santo' or Holy Ghost Orchid.' The orchids were brought back to Gorgona and disseminated over the Canal Zone, the United States, and Europe. Soon, the level of the Lake was encroaching on Gorgona, and necessitated a transferring of the workers to Balboa [Pacific side]."

=== Powell's orchid garden takes root ===
"I can remember my first orchid, I was just looking over the country one Sunday, about 18 months after I got down there when I saw it way up near the top of a tall tree. 'You're certainly a beauty,' I said. 'I must have you.' While I was standing there wondering how on earth to climb that tree a bare-footed Indian came along. 'I'll give you 25 cents gold to get that flower,' I said. The Indian used the vines to swing to the tree [like Tarzan] and cut off the orchid." "For about five years, I suppose, I would pull the orchids apart and study them, but never keep the plants." "He studied the orchid intelligently: learning, throughout the years about orchids from books, worldwide correspondence, and visitors." About the books he remarked: "I couldn't read a French or German newspaper, but with a little Latin I could make out the technical works." In February 1916, Powell was pondering his many memorable orchid-related experiences: echoing in his mind, no doubt, were those at Gatun Lake. A watershed moment occurred; "he lost no time starting an orchid garden." "Powell started his collection on his front porch. When that got so packed with plants he couldn't move, he started an annex by building a tier of shelves on the rear wall of his house." "It wasn't long until both were overflowing and he had to construct a latticed roof and screened-in, vine-clad, wire mesh walls." "The establishing of the garden was actuated by the act of Mrs. A. H. Bryan presenting Mr. Powell with about a thousand plants, and a further donation by Charles H. Beetham." There was nothing published on growing orchids outdoors; Powell pioneered the techniques.

=== Flower Power ===
References to the power and allure of the wild orchid are peppered throughout the world's cultural, historical, and contemporary beliefs. As far back as the fifth century BC, the Chinese philosopher Confucius used wild orchids as symbolism to deepen the meaning of his poems; "he compared the virtuous man to an orchid. Echoing this thought, Chinese artists sometimes placed orchids in their work to evoke the Confucian qualities of humility, integrity, refinement—in fact, all the virtues of a perfectly cultured gentleman and scholar." "The ancient Greeks associated it with virility, and the Aztecs were said to drink a mixture of the vanilla orchid and chocolate to give them power and strength." To others, "orchids possess a sensual, quasi-mystical aura: thought of as sexual, wild, rare creatures." In the 1939 book The Orchid Hunters, Norman MacDonald wrote: "For when a man falls in love with orchids, he'll do anything to possess the one he wants. It's like chasing a green-eyed woman [being consumed by desire] or taking cocaine. A sort of madness..." In a 2002 NOVA interview, Susan Orlean (Author, The Orchid Thief, non-fiction) revealed her research findings: "Nothing in science can account for the way people feel about orchids. Orchids arouse passion more than romance. They are the sexiest flowers on Earth." And in 2006, an article about "Fanatical collectors driving a £6 billion black market of 'trophy' specimens" was published in The Telegraph. In this article, Eric Hansen (Author, Orchid Fever, non-fiction) recalls a flower-grower telling him: 'You can get off alcohol, drugs, women, food and cars, but once you're hooked on orchids you're finished. You never get off orchids. Never.'"

Specifically, the prevailing belief about orchids during Powell's lifetime was described thusly: "There is one plant, which stands so far above all the rest for unique beauty and grandeur that it is universally regarded as the aristocrat of the floral kingdom, namely, the orchid. The Central American orchids, above all others in North or South America, are regarded as furnishing the climax [occupying the highest point] and should be called the 'aristocrat of the aristocrats.'"

=== Powell the orchid hunter ===
Falling under the wild orchid's powerful spell, Powell fit the profile of a classic orchid hunter with one exception–he was not interested in selling his treasures–he wanted to collect them. Some biographical sources indicate Powell collected orchids beginning with his arrival in Panama in 1907; however, it seems more likely his collecting began after he settled in Balboa. At first he collected locally; ultimately, his objective was to "assemble a complete collection of Panama species." "Powell and Hunter went on collecting trips in the Chiriquí region in 1918, 1920, and 1922; Powell went there without Hunter in 1924. Powell's last collecting trip was to the Veraguas Province in March, 1925." In 1931, George T. Moore, director of the MBG wrote: "The perils and experiences of the early orchid hunters were as thrilling and romantic as those of any arctic explorer." About the typical orchid hunter, Susan Orlean had this to say: "Orchid hunting hasn't really changed over the last 200 years and orchid hunters haven't really changed. You have to be brave; you have to be somewhat foolish."

==== Powell's orchid hunting war stories ====
...crawled for half a mile

Orchid hunting is no pleasure jaunt. I remember one time when it looked as if I would have to leave behind several plants of a bulky variety because they and the machete could not be handled at the same time. The under-growth was not so dense for a foot or two (approximately 30-60 cm) above ground. I got down on hands and knees and crawled for half a mile (roughly 800 m) but I brought home the orchids.

My heart stopped

Up in Chiriquí, in the northwestern corner of Panama, orchids are found in abundance at an altitude of 4,000 feet (1,200 m) to 6,000 feet (1,800 m). Likewise abundant are barrancas, steep gullies like those in the Rockies, maybe hundreds of yards (meters) long and 1,000 feet (300 m) deep. One day about 6 years ago – I was 66 then – I saw a fine plant growing on a half-dead limb that grew out almost horizontally over one of those barrancas. 'I never saw you before,' I thought, and 'I won't let you get away, barranca or no barranca.' My man shinned out a few feet (roughly a meter) on that dying branch and then scurried back, scared at the prospect of a 500-foot (150 m) fall. That made me mad. I threw off my hat, coat, and shoes and went after that orchid. Just as I reached out for it the branch cracked. My heart stopped. But I never let loose my grip on that plant and scurried back to earth like a scared chipmunk. And that—that was the first time I ever saw the Odontoglossum Powellia.

Ants in the plants

A colony of vicious ants always is found in the roots of the bucket orchid. I am beginning to believe the eggs and waste nourish the orchid. As the branch falls [to the ground] the Indian scrambles down [the tree] and dives in the nearest water. You make a noose in a long rope, drop it over the branch and jerk it into the water. In a half hour or so the ants have drowned or floated away. Then you can pick up your rare find, but not before.

George Harry Pring (see below) elaborated on collecting bucket orchids: "Removing a clump of these plants may be compared with disturbing a hornet's nest, but, according to Mr. Powell, who had experienced both adventures, the hornets are easier to combat than the thousands of small stinging ants." Pring then told of a fourth collection technique used by Powell and Hunter; one Pring himself used. "In many instances, to dislodge the epiphyte [an "air plant", growing non-parasitically, sometimes 40–50 feet from the ground] without climbing the tree, it is necessary to cut a sapling with a forked-top as long as the distance up to where it clings. Its roots in some cases are three to four feet long, and great dexterity is required to dislodge it as to not cause injury. During this operation, clouds of dust, granulated bark and moss which rain down from above almost blind the collector." "These men got many fine specimens through this method."

== Powell's Horticultural Garden goes global ==
=== Powell and Rolfe ===
Found in Powell's garden

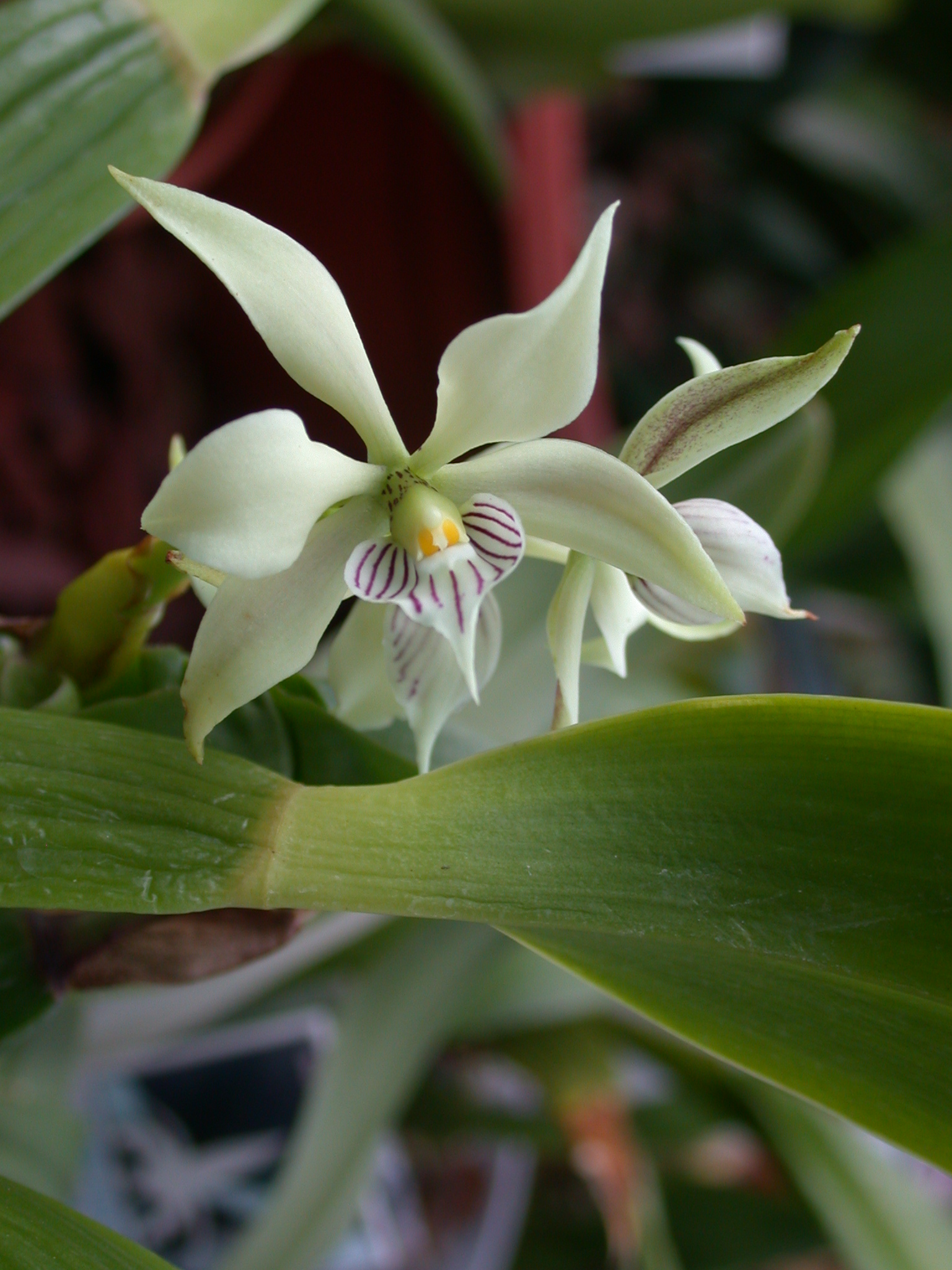
Epidendrum fragrans

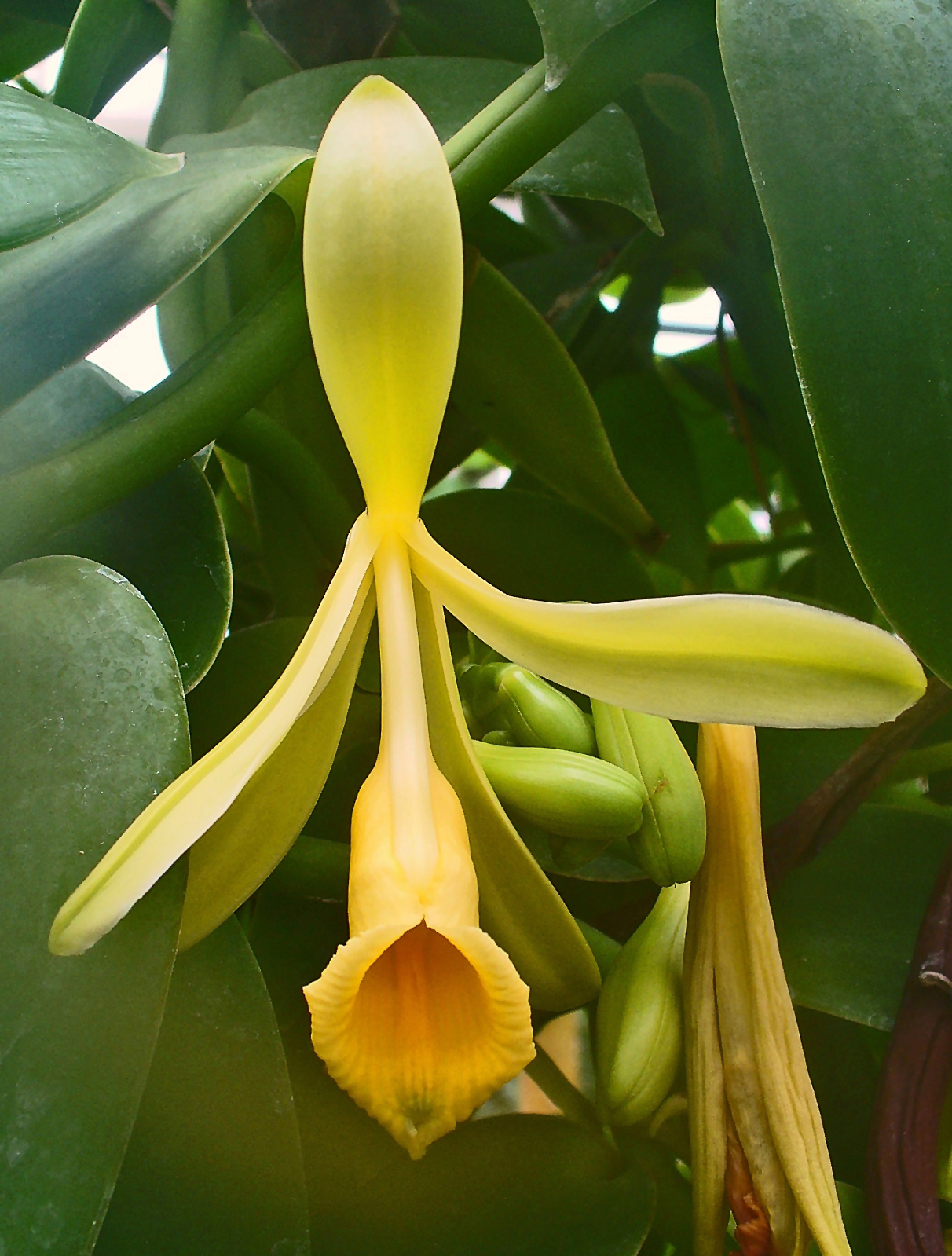
Vanilla on trellises

As his garden expanded over the next few years, Powell's orchid documentation and explorations took a new path. All the while working full-time in the dispensary, the care, documenting, and pursuit of his beloved orchids occupied most of his spare time—quite an accomplishment. "Although 193 [now 215] of Powell’s specimens were recorded without dates; the first dated records of collections began in 1915. In early 1918, realizing that many of his plants were not described in his books, he made contact with R. Allen Rolfe at the Royal Botanic Gardens, Kew, England." A package "C. W. P." (Powell) sent Rolfe was acknowledged by the latter via The Orchid Review (May 1918): "The package duly arrived, but was badly broken and the contents missing. Perhaps further materials can be sent. In practice we find the most successful method is to press small specimens in a fold of blotting paper and enclose in an ordinary letter." On a February 12, 1919, specimen (Mormodes powellii Schltr.) sent to Rolfe, Powell remarked: "Metallic bees nearly ate it up before I could cut it."

Herbarium specimen preparation

Transitioning from hobbyist to horticulturist, Powell needed a way to forward his finds to researchers and preserve them for future reference. He studied the standardized method for specimen preservation and storage. Specimens were dried by extracting moisture in a device called a plant press; however in one instance he noted: "Live flower mashed flat with finger." Although he was initially cautioned against it, he added artificial heat (an electric light bulb or electric iron) which aided in the quality of the results in the tropics. In a letter to Rolfe, Powell asks: "It [the drying] was done over an Electric Light Bulb while lighted up. I have done a lot of experimenting in the drying of flowers, both with stove and sun heat, but this seems to have been the most successful. How is it for a Specimen?" The pressed plant could then be affixed to a mounting sheet (11 X 17 inch paper). Label data (essential documentary information) was added. Once label data was added to the mounting sheet, it was ready for shipping. The mounting sheet (specimen) became a candidate for long-term storage in a repository (like the Harvard University Herbaria). Once accepted, the mounting sheet would then be known as a herbarium specimen. At first he sent just the preserved flowers, but soon he was asked to send preserved plants that included the roots, stems, leaves, flowers, and seeds. Powell painstakingly crafted his mounting sheets; he enhanced them with fieldnotes, illustrations, flower cutouts, and photographs. His original sheets would stand on their own as works of art; over time they have evolved into beautiful, remarkably detailed documents.

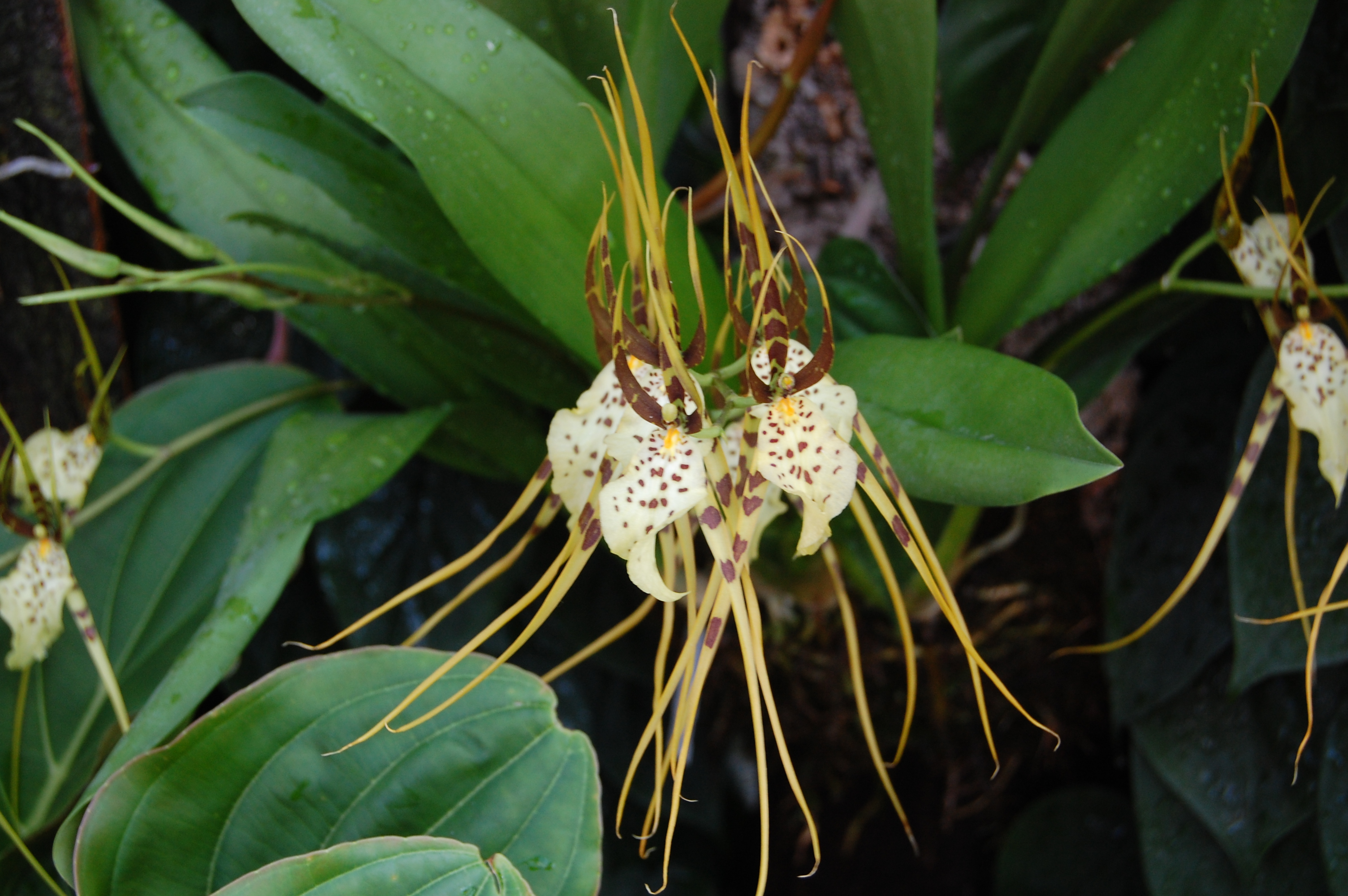
Brassia caudata/Spider orchid is also found in Florida, U.S.

Herbarium specimen examples

Many of Powell's earliest specimens–most now available as digitized images–are found in the herbarium at Kew; some records there include letters from Powell to Rolfe. Over 400 distinct examples of Powell's collection records, many with images of his herbarium specimens, are found in a virtual herbarium at the Harvard University Herbaria and Libraries. Tropicos (maintained by the MBG), The Swedish Museum of Natural History, and other repositories (to a lesser extent) provide additional sources for online viewing of herbarium specimens.

For No. 1 Oncidium oerstedii with photographs.

For No. 20 Cyncnoches guttulatum with photos, letter, sprays. Curated at Kew Royal Botanic Gardens, England.

For his spider orchid (Brassia caudata) with cutout.

For his Prosthechea fragrans (Sw.) W.E. Higgins showing the evolution of a herbarium specimen.

Herbarium specimen examples with hand-drawn illustrations

Powell's signature, CWP. (CW is overlapping), is found in the lower right.

Epidendrum fragrans enhanced with Powell's flower-only drawing

Information included in Powell's label data and fieldnotes

- Scientific name: genus and species
- Detailed location: country of collection (example: Repub of Panama/Province of Chiriquí); locality (examples: Foot hills east of the city or Cativa-Porto Bello trail); altitude (examples: sea level or 4-5000Ft)
- Habitat (examples: grows in ants nests or grows in shady places); plant’s position on a tree (example: laying flat on the tree limb)
- Plant's description: color and details of the flower (example: dark blood red); color and texture of the leaves (example: dark, velvety green)
- time of year or month range it flowered (example: July to August)
- Collector's name: C. W. Powell
- Determiner's name
- Collection number
- Date of collection

In July 1918, Powell began to send Rolfe a series of herbarium specimens. It took roughly 8 months for a portion (29) to be identified, communication slowed; Rolfe was in ill health and died before he had a chance to [fully] study Powell's collection. Rolfe's death was a great disappointment to Powell; he had derived much encouragement and help from Rolfe's kindly cooperation and guidance."

"Parasita Grande"

Accustomed to dogged pursuit in genealogy research, Powell pressed on. He realized the need to systematically document the "Orchids of Panama" for study. He was energized by the thrill of the hunt. His fellow researchers began to take notice. Powell was persistent, he infused enthusiasm in his dealings, and he instilled in his fellow researchers the confidence that—he had something to offer in the confusing world of the Orchidaceae. "Mr. Powell's enthusiasm for these plants has caused him to be locally termed 'the Orchid Man' ('Parasita Grande'), and his garden is one of the show places in Balboa to both the botanist and tourist." Perhaps while acting as tour guide, the idea sprouted—to someday donate his garden; little did he know how much joy and peaceful beauty his expanding orchid collection would one day bring to visitors of a botanical garden 2,300 miles (3,700 km) away. The reputation of Powell's Horticultural Garden, Balboa, Canal Zone began to grow on a global scale.

=== Images of Powell and his Canal Zone garden ===
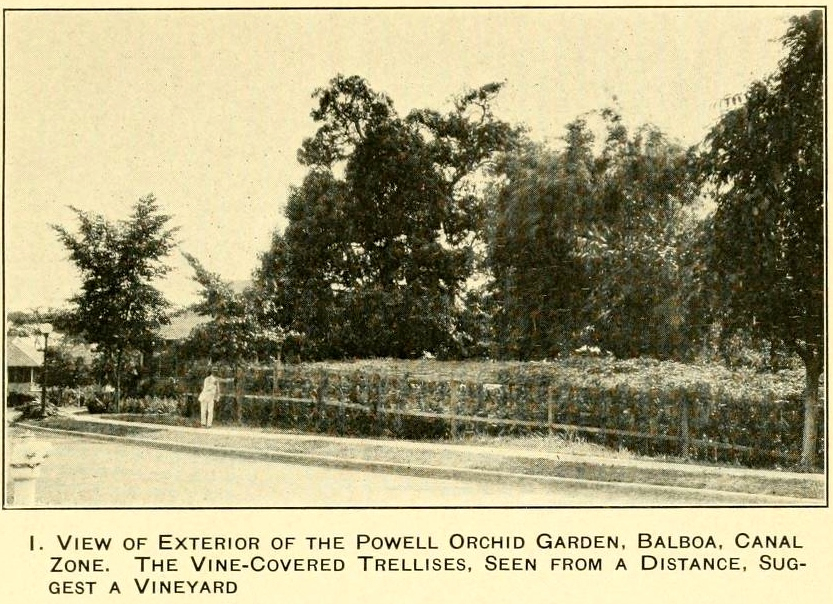
Exterior garden view. Powell on left, dressed in white, for scale

"Orchids are surprisingly difficult to see in the wild; the majority being epiphytic, growing high in the canopy on trunks, branches or in crotches out of sight." In Powell's garden they were at eye-level—a sight to behold. "A rustic gate gives entrance to this miniature paradise. The gate posts are formed of dead jungle trees covered with Orchids. The walks, bordered with beautiful ferns and lilies, lead between Orchid-covered dead trees that are a riot of colour." "Much painstaking labor has converted it into a miniature jungle—plus all the beauty and minus all the dangers of a real jungle. There are few thrills equal to seeing in the early morning a host of these beautiful flowers that have suddenly burst in full blossom, nodding a merry good morning."

Six images are hosted in an online exhibit by Missouri Digital Heritage: contributions by Missouri Botanical Garden.

- Powell Orchid Garden. Balboa, Panama #1. Powell relaxing in a chair
- Powell Orchid Garden #2. Powell dwarfed by the size of his garden
- George Pring, George Moore, Charles Powell at the Tropical Station #3.
- Powell Orchid Garden #4. Inspecting a plant.
- Powell Orchid Garden #5. Wall to wall orchids.
- Powell Orchid Garden #6. Young woman (possibly daughter) in garden.

Thumbnail image of Powell captured in 1923, examining a night-blooming cereus from his garden: hosted by the Hunt Institute for Botanical Documentation.

=== Associations with world's leading authorities ===
The relationships between the orchid experts of the time were complicated; mutual respect, admiration, cooperation and financial support of each other were interwoven with intense competition, rivalry, and double-dealing. Regarding multi-country cooperation via plant exchanges, in 1938, the Missouri Botanical Garden Bulletin reported: "A system of exchange of plants with other countries, begun by Mr. Powell, had been discontinued for some years. During the year it was re-established and exchanges were made with nine countries."

Powell and Schlechter

Beginning in 1919, thanks to a tip from a correspondent in Costa Rica, German botanist, taxonomist, and author Rudolf Schlechter (curator of the herbarium at the Berlin Botanical Garden) began corresponding with and receiving numerous duplicate specimens (ones originally sent to Rolfe) from Powell. "Schlechter immediately recognized the importance of the plant collection, and encouraged Mr. Powell in every way to send in further specimens." "Schlechter took up the taxonomy (classification) of Panamanian orchids in August, 1920." "An astonishing number of plants proved to be entirely new to science (not less than 75)." Schlechter added: "Just as important as the new species is the rediscovery of a whole series of species, having originally been discovered by Warszewicz, but never found again." "Schlechter wrote to Powell: 'Your exploration of the orchid flora of Panama is one of the most important facts in orchidology during the later years.'" Schlechter named dozens of species in Powell's honor (see Schlechter's author abbreviation, Schltr., in "Legacy" below). Waiting until after Rolfe's death (1921), in 1922, Schlechter published his 95-page Orchidaceae Powellianae Panamenses (collections by C. Powell) part of which transcribes as follows: "It is sure that no one has made such a contribution to our knowledge of these orchids as Mr. Powell through his 'exceedingly mighty collection,' which contains not only species with conspicuous flowers, but also those in which the size of the blooms scarcely exceeds that of a pin-head." "We cannot thank Mr. Powell enough for this self-sacrificing research that he has undertaken in spite of his age. For the orchidology of Panama he has done more than any of his predecessors." Most of Schlechter's specimens were destroyed in 1943, during the bombing of Berlin, in the Second World War.

Powell, Oakes Ames, and Blanche Ames

In 1922, Powell began relations with Harvard University's Oakes Ames, a botanist, and the most eminent American orchid authority at the time. Due to intense competition with Schlechter, "Ames went so far as to sign with Powell a formal contract in which the latter would collect orchids for him for U.S. $100 per month. From that point forward, Powell only sent Schlechter duplicate specimens. Ames, his wife Blanche, and daughter Pauline traveled to Central America in early 1923, partly to meet Powell and see his garden; after this visit, Ames received some of Powell’s specimens. Of these, 29 were new to science. Based on an orchid from Powell's garden, Blanche, recognized as an outstanding botanical illustrator, enriched one of her husband's specimens by painting this captivating watercolor. That same year, Ames praised the quality of Powell’s work: 'His indefatigable zeal is one of the joys in my contemplation of Central American orchidology. His specimens are often works of art.'" Ames dedicated several orchid species to Powell and cited Powell's specimens throughout his Schedulae Orchidianae (1922-1930) publications. Today, the Economic Herbarium of Oakes Ames at Harvard University has a searchable specimen database which includes many of Powell's original works.

Powell and Lankester

In September 1922, Powell sent a letter to Ames introducing "my good friend" es:Charles H. Lankester. Lankester, a British coffee grower, naturalist, and orchidologist, was living in Cartago, Costa Rica, a country with great potential for new to science orchid species. Powell facilitated what would become a "deep friendship between Lankester and Ames that lasted 25 years." Traveling to Costa Rica in 1925, Powell visited Lankester, who in turn traveled to Panama in 1927. "I have just spent a fortnight with my fellow sufferer from orchiditis, CWP, + it was a very delightful time of talk and talk and then talk." Lankester's orchid garden transformed over time into the Lankester Botanical Gardens. Located outside of Cartago, Costa Rica, the garden is now operated by the University of Costa Rica as a research center and is open to tourists.

Powell and Standley

Standley's summation

There can scarcely be for any tropical country a record of one person who has contributed so much to the knowledge of the orchid flora. The Powell orchid garden at Balboa is one of the most interesting sights of the Canal Zone, and botanically by far the most remarkable thing to be seen there. It is something unique in tropical America, if not in the whole world.

In the 1924 Annual Report to the Board of Regents of The Smithsonian Institution, Paul C. Standley reported about Powell: "Years of experience, through which the best methods have been discovered, combined with the attention to details such as other collectors rarely attain, have enabled him to make specimens which are unsurpassed. Among the vines that cover the trellises in the Powell garden are various plants of Vanilla, of which there are two common species in Panama, V. planifolia with narrow leaves (see image above) and V. pompona with wide leaves."

Powell and Pring

George H. Pring, a horticulturist at the MBG, made many trips to remote locations in Central and South America. "In 1923 Pring visited the Panama Canal Zone, where he spent six months, weeks of which were at Powell's garden talking orchids from 6 a.m. to 3 a.m." "Powell, in turn, was overjoyed to entertain a man who knew orchids from the outside in." Pring presented Powell with rare plants gathered in the Andes and Powell reciprocated with 300 plants from his garden for the MBG. This association would prove mutually beneficial; back at the MBG, "a great interest arose for Panama’s orchids." In 1926, Powell and Pring would be together again: this time in Missouri. "They appeared to take up the conversation where they left off three years ago. Long botanical names crackled in their dialogue."

== 1926 ==
=== Donation ===
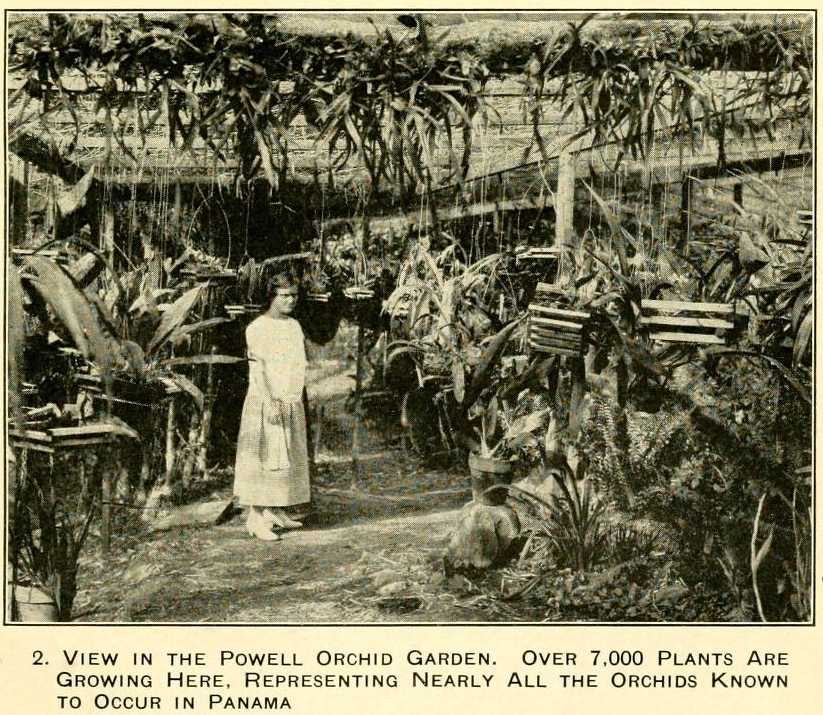
7,000 plants-500 orchid species

Knowing the time would come when he could no longer care for the 7,000 plants (including cacti, palms, ferns, lilies, and roughly 500 orchid species) in his astonishing garden, "On March 1, 1926, Powell, Pring, and George Moore (Director of the MBG-aka Shaw's Garden) met in Panama and finalized the details of a great gift—Powell generously presented the Missouri Botanical Garden with his world-wide-known collection of orchids." "For the benefit of orchid growers throughout the world," the MBG's 1926 bulletin gives an accounting of some the orchids gifted by Powell. "At age 72, Powell had one of the greatest private orchid collections in the world; his donation made the Shaw's Garden orchid collection the finest in the world."

=== Creation of Panama Extension Station ===
"The MBG created a ‘tropical station’ at the foot of Ancon Hill (hill overlooking Panama City, Panama), on lands [2.5 acres (1.0 ha)] granted by the Canal Zone Government. Then Secretary of War and former Park Commissioner of St. Louis, Missouri, Dwight F. Davis, approved the MBG's application for this land grant." "Powell's collection became the [nucleus of the] Panama Extension Station of the MBG; he was appointed its first director and a residence was built for him on the grounds." "Powell’s collection marked the beginning of the Garden’s reputation in orchid horticulture." "After Powell’s death there was a good deal of confusion regarding the care of the plants; they were neglected and many died. Pring and Hunter spent two months restocking the grounds. Hunter took over the direction of the Tropical Station and maintained this position until his own death in 1935. In 1939, the Tropical Station was transferred to the Canal Zone Government. During its almost 13 years of existence, the Tropical Station supplied the greenhouses in Saint Louis with a constant flow of living plants." "Today, Ancon Hill is a popular jogging and hiking trek. All manner of vegetation and birds can be seen, including a large number of orchids (which are protected by CITES)."

=== Powell visits Missouri Botanical Garden ===
On August 30, 1926, Powell travelled from Panama to the United States on the Ancon, a Panama Railway Company steamship and the first ship to officially transit the Panama Canal in 1914. "He met, sometimes for the first time, his 'Brothers in Science.' Visits to New York, Philadelphia and Washington preceded his arrival in St. Louis, Missouri. Everywhere he was greeted as an old friend by scientists and orchid enthusiasts. These knew him through a decade of learned correspondence and others had made pilgrimages to his famous garden for it is a mecca of the orchid world." After spending more than 10 years searching any possible habitat for orchids–from the lakes at sea level, to the hillsides, and up into the higher elevations of mountainous Panama–he was lionized as "The Canal Zone's exotic plant specialist."

=== Recognition and retirement ===
Charles W. Powell was awarded the Roosevelt Medal with two service bars (second bar awarded on March 1, 1913) for continuous distinguished civilian work as an employee of the Isthmian Canal Commission (or the Panama Railroad Company). Of roughly 50,000 workers, only 1,661 medalists earned the second bar.

Retiring on October 10, 1926, Powell's service record in the Canal Zone's Sanitation department documents his annuity.

=== Desiderata: "The answer was orchids" ===
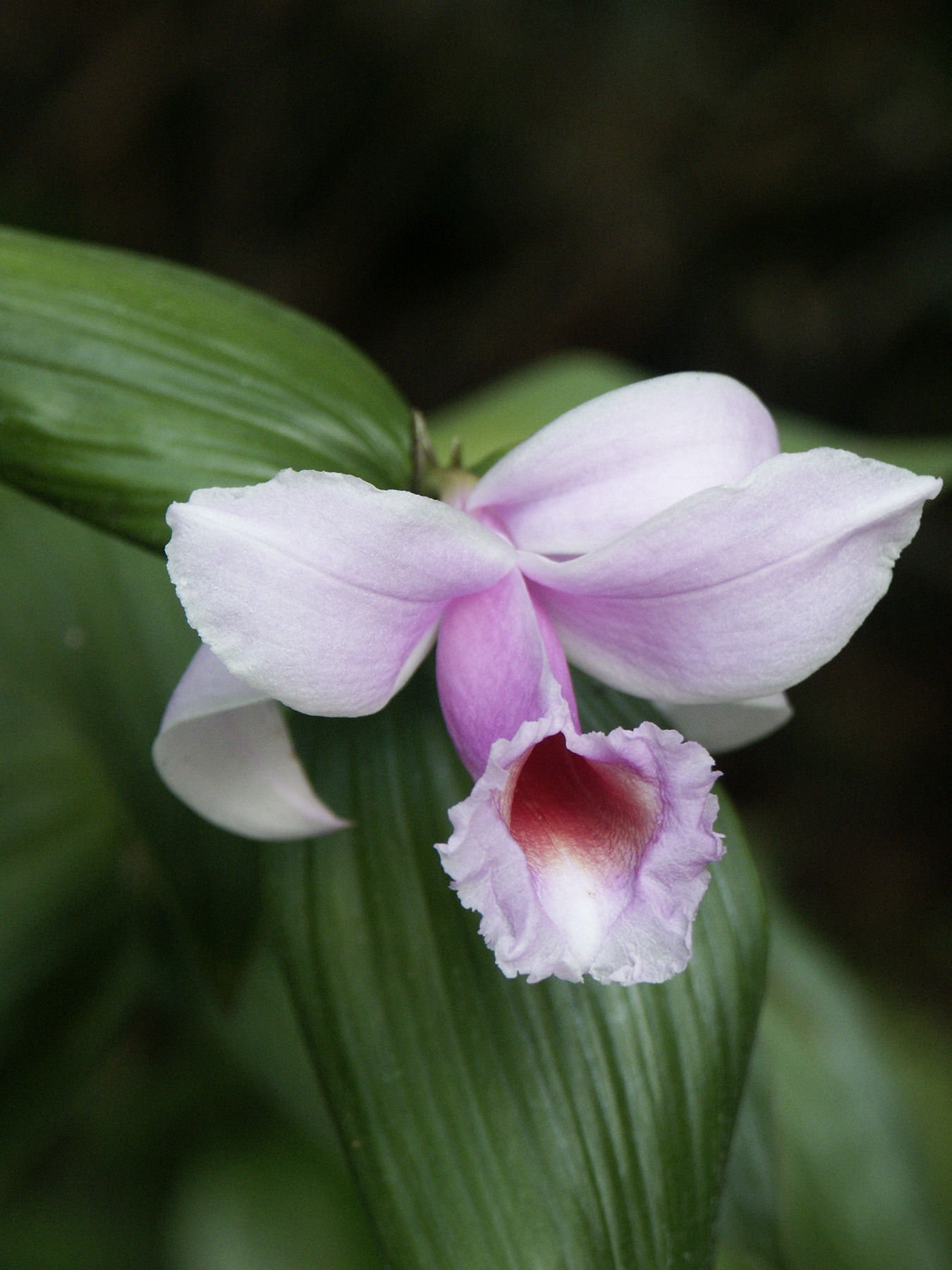
Sobraila decora. See Powell's specimen February 1915

Life in early 1900s Panama presented a unique opportunity for Powell to find his passion in orchids. The labor requirement for the construction of the Panama Canal provided him with a livelihood; and an outing on the newly created Gatun Lake awakened a desire to "catch" orchids instead of fish. Soon, he would become a man on a mission: a man with direction and purpose. Powell searched high and low for beautiful, diverse, rare and new-to-science orchids with great vigor. He risked life and limb to acquire his specimens. The worldwide correspondence, camaraderie, conversation and competition among like-minded orchid lovers suited his nature. Through his later life's love, Powell caught the world by surprise; he may have caught himself by surprise. Charles Wesley Powell's donation was the manifestation of his calling to serve mankind by contributing to the greater common good: a permanent legacy of his work. As a late bloomer, he made his mark with orchids.

Desiderata (Latin: "desired things"):

I wanted flowers. Naturally I wanted the best;

naturally I wanted something I had never seen.

The answer was orchids. —Powell, 1926

== Death ==
"Charles Wesley Powell's health failed him at the very beginning of the peaceful and interesting years which he had planned. He died of heart disease, very suddenly, on August 18, 1927, at the age of 73." Three daughters survived him. He and his daughter, Addie (née Pullen) Foster (1887-1925), were buried in the Corozal American Cemetery and Memorial in Panama.

== Legacy: Orchids named in Powell's honor ==
"Orchids are an ancient plant family that has evolved an amazing array of flower types, pollination mechanisms and complex interactions with animals and fungi. In the plant world, orchids reign supreme as about 10 percent of all plant species are orchids." "The Orchid family (Orchidaceae) contains the largest number of plant species in the world - up to 30,000. Panama alone has about 1,100 known species." Powell submitted at least 496 distinct specimens; in 1926, 109 were reported as new to science.

"Orchids are a difficult and confusing taxonomic group. People who specialize in the Orchid family usually spend years naming different species based on DNA and morphology."

Images from Smithsonian Institution's Annual Report 1924
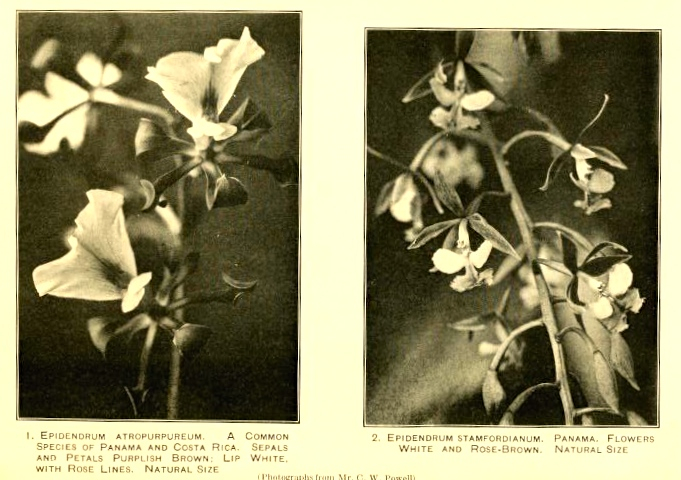
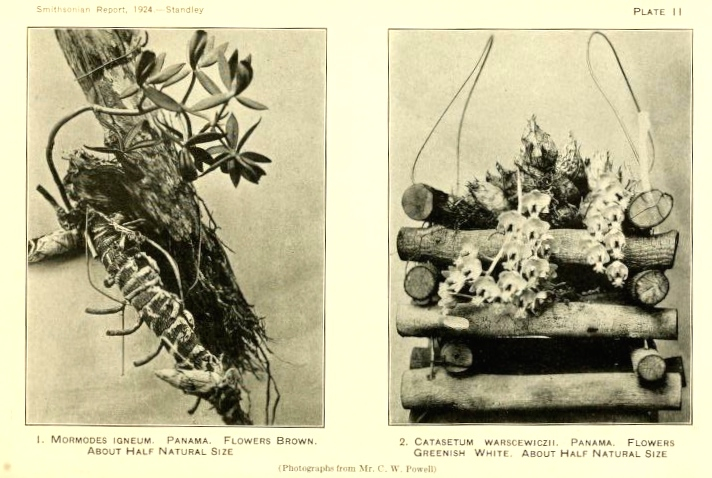

A partial list of species or synonyms (and examples of common names) named in Powell's honor:

- Coryanthes powellii Schltr.
- Cycnoches powellii Schltr. - Powell's Cycnoches
- Dichaea powellii Schltr. - Powell's Dichaea
- Dresslerella powellii (Ames) C. A. Luer
- Encyclia powellii Schltr.
- Epidendrum powellii Schltr.
- Gongora powellii Schltr.
- Govenia powellii Schltr.
- Hexadesmia powellii Schltr.
- Leochilus powellii Schltr.
- Lycaste powellii Schltr. - Powell's Lycaste
- Maxillaria powellii Schltr.
- Mormodes powellii Schltr. - Powell's Mormodes
- Oncidium powellii Schltr.
- Ornithocephalus powellii Schltr.
- Palmorchis powellii (Ames) Schweinf. & Correll - Powell's Palmorchis
- Pleurothallis powellii Schltr. - Powell's Pleurothallis
- Polystachya powellii Ames
- Restrepia powellii Schltr.
- Rossioglossum powellii (Schltr.) Garay
  previously Odontoglossum powellii Schltr.
- Sarcoglottis powellii Schltr.
- Scaphyglottis powellii Schltr.
- Sobralia powellii Schltr. - Powell's Sobralia
- Stelis powellii Schltr.
- Trichopilia powellii Schltr.
- Xylobium powellii Schltr.

Orchidaceae-Pronunciation
or-kid-AY-see-ee, Alternative Pronunciation: or-kid-AY-see-eye

powellii-Pronunciation
pow-EL-ee-eye

Species dedicated to Powell
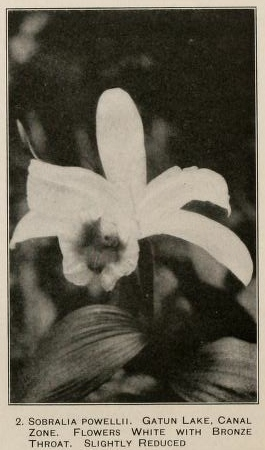
Sobralia powellii

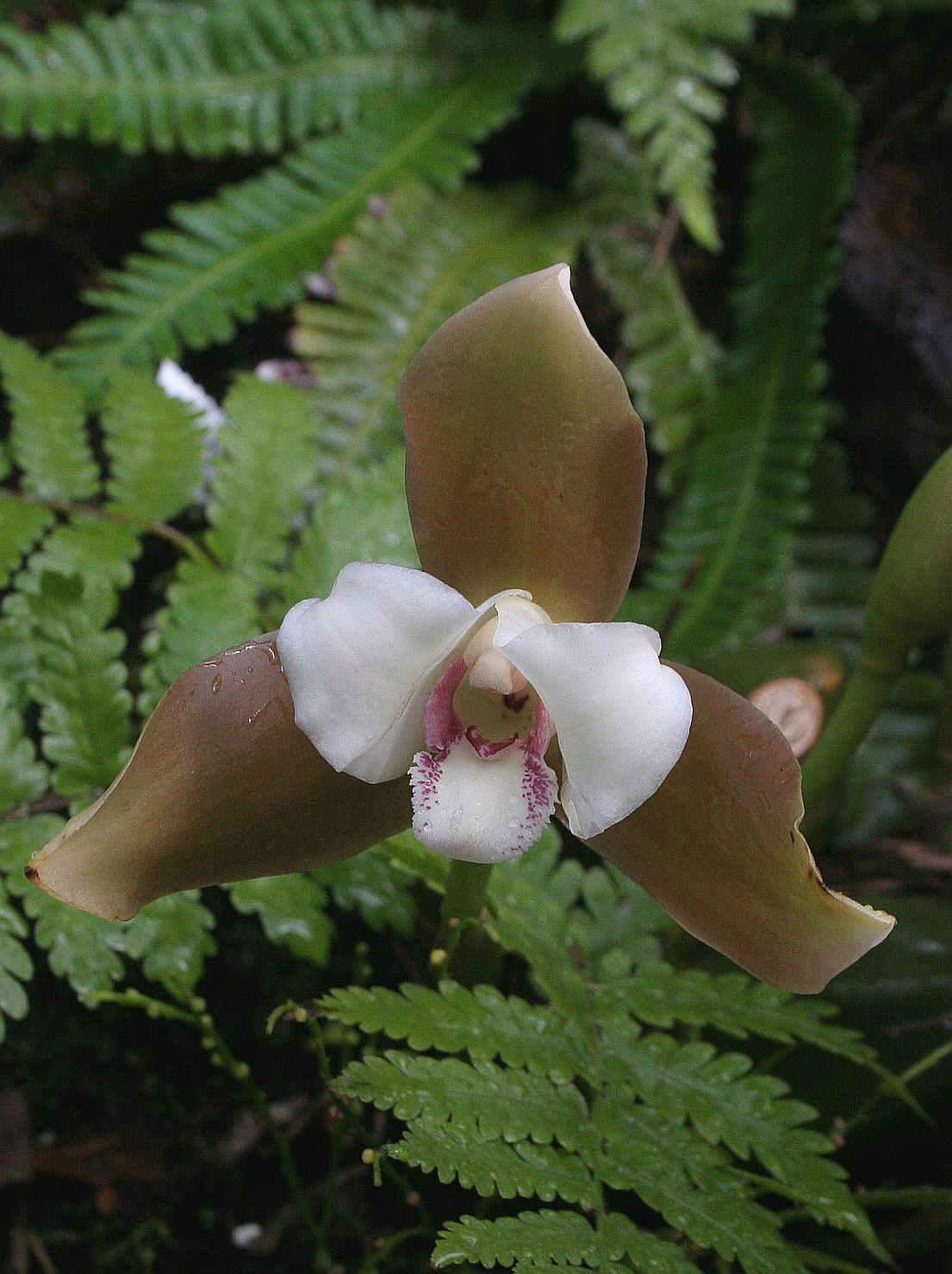
Lycaste powellii

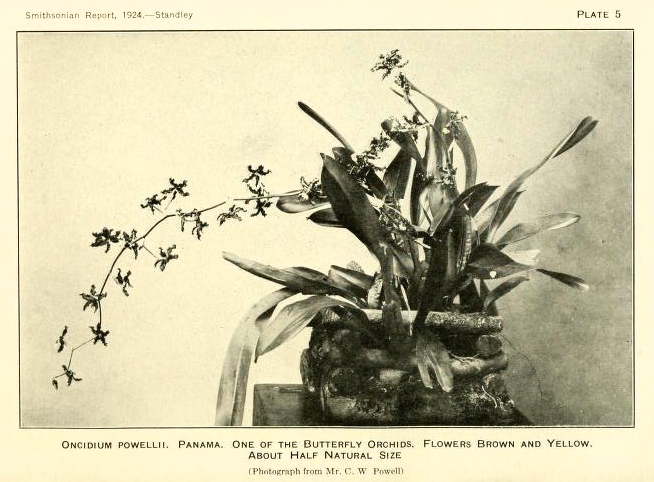
Oncidium powellii

== Books referencing Powell ==
- Orchidaceae Powellianae Panamenses (collections by C. Powell)
- Schedulae Orchidianae No. 2
- Schedulae Orchidianae No. 3
- Schedulae Orchidianae No. 4
- Schedulae Orchidianae No. 5
- Schedulae Orchidianae No. 6
- Schedulae Orchidianae No. 7
- Schedulae Orchidianae No. 8
- Schedulae Orchidianae No. 9
- Schedulae Orchidianae No. 10
- Flora of the Panama Canal Zone
- The Orchidaceae, Flora of Panama (4 parts in Missouri Botanical Garden Bulletins 1946 and 1949)

== Organization memberships ==
- American Folklore Society 1888 1889
- Office Men's Club, New Orleans, Louisiana. Recording secretary 1895
- Virginia Historical Society 1896

== See also ==
- List of orchidologists
- List of botanists by author abbreviation (C)
- The Plant List A worldwide, comprehensive, searchable database.
- Tropicos (Missouri Botanical Garden) A botanical database.
