= Jacob Jonas Ochse =

Dutch horticulturist (1892-1970)

Jacob Jonas Ochse (5 July 1892, The Hague – 21 April 1970) was a Dutch horticulturalist, agronomist, plant collector, and botanist, specializing in tropical and subtropical botany.

== Biography ==
Ochse received in 1911 his baccalaureate degree from the Dutch national horticultural college Rijkslandbouwschool (now named Wageningen University & Research) and in 1913 his master's degree from Utrecht University. From 1914 he worked as an assistant in Java on a plantation where rubber, tea, coffee, and cinchona were grown. From 1915 to 1922 in Java he worked for the Dutch department of agriculture under the Dutch ministry in charge of agriculture (now part of the Ministry of Agriculture, Nature and Food Quality). He married in 1916. The couple and had two daughters, Nelly (1918–2007) and Ans (1921–2007). He collected botanical specimens in Sumatra. He was from 1923 to 1928 an assistant inspector in agriculture, from 1929 to 1935 an agricultural consultant in the Dutch department of agriculture, and from 1936 to 1937 the head of a division of horticulture. In 1929 he earned an agricultural engineer's diploma in Batavia, Dutch East Indies. From 1938 to 1946 he was an employee in a division of general economic affairs within the Dutch ministry in charge of economic affairs (now part of the Ministry of Economic Affairs and Climate Policy). However, in 1942 Japanese military forces conquered the Dutch East Indies and imprisoned Dutch nationals. J. J. Ochse, his wife, their daughter Ans, their daughter Nelly, and Nelly's husband were imprisoned for three and a half years. Nelly's son was born in an internment camp in 1942. The family was not released until October 1945. The botanist David Fairchild was instrumental in helping the family move to Miami-Dade County, Florida.

Ochse became in 1946 a professor of applied tropical botany at the University of Miami. J. J. Ochse and Nelly's husband, Marinus Johannes Dijkman (1907–1970), both became professors at the University of Miami and established the University of Miami's department of tropical agriculture. Marinus and Nelly Dijkman built the first orchid house at the Fairchild Tropical Botanic Garden.

The United Fruit Company started a major banana breeding project in 1959. The company selected Paul Hamilton Allen and J. J. Ochse to lead collecting expeditions to Southeast Asia and the Western Pacific. From 1959 to 1961 their expeditions extensively collected banana germplasm —nearly 800 accessions of wild and cultivated species and varieties of bananas from Taiwan, the Philippines, Indonesia, Malaysia, Singapore, Thailand and Sri Lanka.

Some of the botanical specimens collected by Ochse are preserved in the herbarium of the Natural History Museum, London.

== Selected publications ==
- Ochse, J. J. (1921). Korte Handleiding voor de manggateelt in Nederlandsch-Indië. (17 pages about mango cultivation)
- Ochse, J. J. (1922). Tanduran djeruk. Weltevreden: Drukkerij Volkslectuur. (citrus fruits in Javanese)
- Ochse, J. J. (1927). Indische vruchten. Weltevreden: Drukkerij Volkslectuur. (300 pages)
- Ochse, J. J. (1931). Indische Groenten, met inbegrip van aardvruchten en kruiderijen. Met medewerking van R.C. Bakhuizen van den Brink. Overzicht der inen uitheemsche gewassen, welke in insulinde tot groente en toespijs dienen (Netherlands-Indies Vegetables, including ground fruits and seasonings. In collaboration with R.C. Bakhuizen van den Brink. Overview of the native plants, which in the Netherlands-Indies serve as vegetables and food). Batavia, Dept. Landbouw, Nijverheid & Handel, Buitenzorg Volkslectuur. (This is a revised and enlarged version of Tropische Groenten published in 1925.)
  - Vegetables of the Dutch East Indies (edible tubers, bulbs rhizomes and spices included) Survey of the indigenous and foreign plants serving as pot-herbs and side-dishes, by J. J. Ochse, in collaboration with R. C. Bakhuizen van den Brink. Buitenzorg, Java, Printed and edited by Archival drukkerij. 1931. (translated by Cornelis Andries Backer) 1980 reprint of 1977 edition. Amsterdam: Asher. 1977. ISBN 9061232724.
- Ochse, J. J. (1931). Vruchten en vruchtenteelt in Nederlandsch-Oost-Indië. Met medewerking van R.C. Bakhuizen van den Brink. Batavia: Kolff.
  - Fruits and fruitculture in the Dutch East Indies: plates from Atje Soleiman by J. J. Ochse in collaboration with R. C. Bakhuizen van den Brink. Batavia: Kolff. 1931. (English edition)
- Ochse, J. J. (1949). "Preliminary Report on a cutting experiment with avocado and mango" (PDF). Proc. Fla. State Hort. Soc. 62: 210–212.
- Ochse, J. J.; Soule, M. J.; Dijkman, M. J.; Wehlburg, C. (1961). Tropical and subtropical agriculture. New York: Macmillan. (2 vols.)
