= Annals of the Missouri Botanical Garden =

Scientific journal

The Annals of the Missouri Botanical Garden is a long-established major peer-reviewed journal of botany, established in 1914 by the Missouri Botanical Garden, under the directorship of botanist and phycologist, George Thomas Moore, and still published quarterly as of 2017 by the Missouri Botanical Garden Press. The journal is often abbreviated Ann. Missouri Bot. Gard.
