= George Thomas Moore =

American botanist (1871–1956)

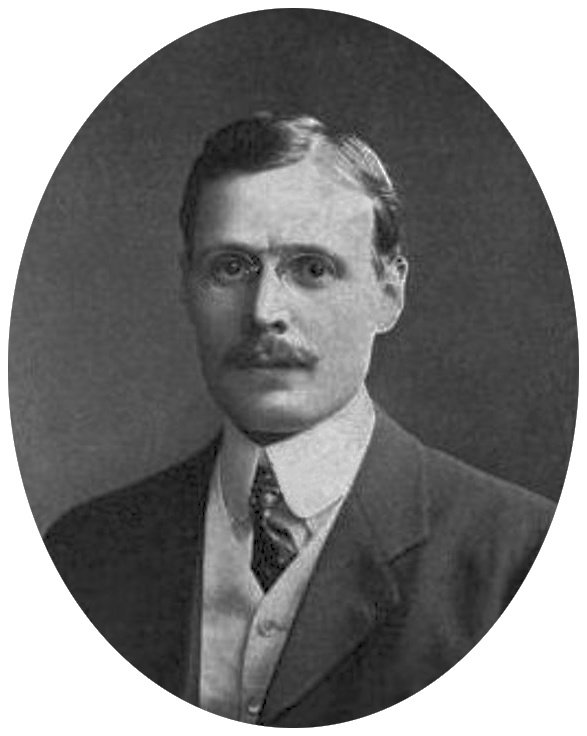
- Born: February 23, 1871; Indianapolis, Indiana, US
- Died: November 27, 1956 (aged 85); St. Louis, Missouri, US
- Resting place: Bellefontaine Cemetery
- Education: Wabash College; Harvard University
- Scientific career
- Fields: Botany, pathology, marine biology, phycology, algae
- Institutions: Marine Biological Laboratory, Missouri Botanical Garden, Laboratory of Plant Pathology
- Author abbrev. (botany): G.Moore

George Thomas Moore (1871–1956) was an American botanist, who specialised in phycology, the study of algae. Moore was the director of the Missouri Botanical Garden in St. Louis, Missouri from 1912 to 1953.

== Biography ==
Moore was born on February 23, 1871, in Indianapolis, Indiana. He obtained both a Bachelor of Science in 1894 from Wabash College in his home state, and a Bachelor of Arts in 1895 from Harvard University, continuing at the latter to obtain a Master of Arts in 1896 and finally, in 1900, a Doctor of Philosophy. Moore headed to the Missouri Botanical Garden after serving for two years as the head of the Botany Department at Dartmouth College, and for some time as head of the Laboratory of Plant Pathology at the United States Department of Agriculture. He was also the head of Marine Biological Laboratory in Woods Hole, Massachusetts. He was elected to the American Philosophical Society in 1905. He also served on the board of trustees for Science Service, now known as Society for Science & the Public, from 1921 to 1923.

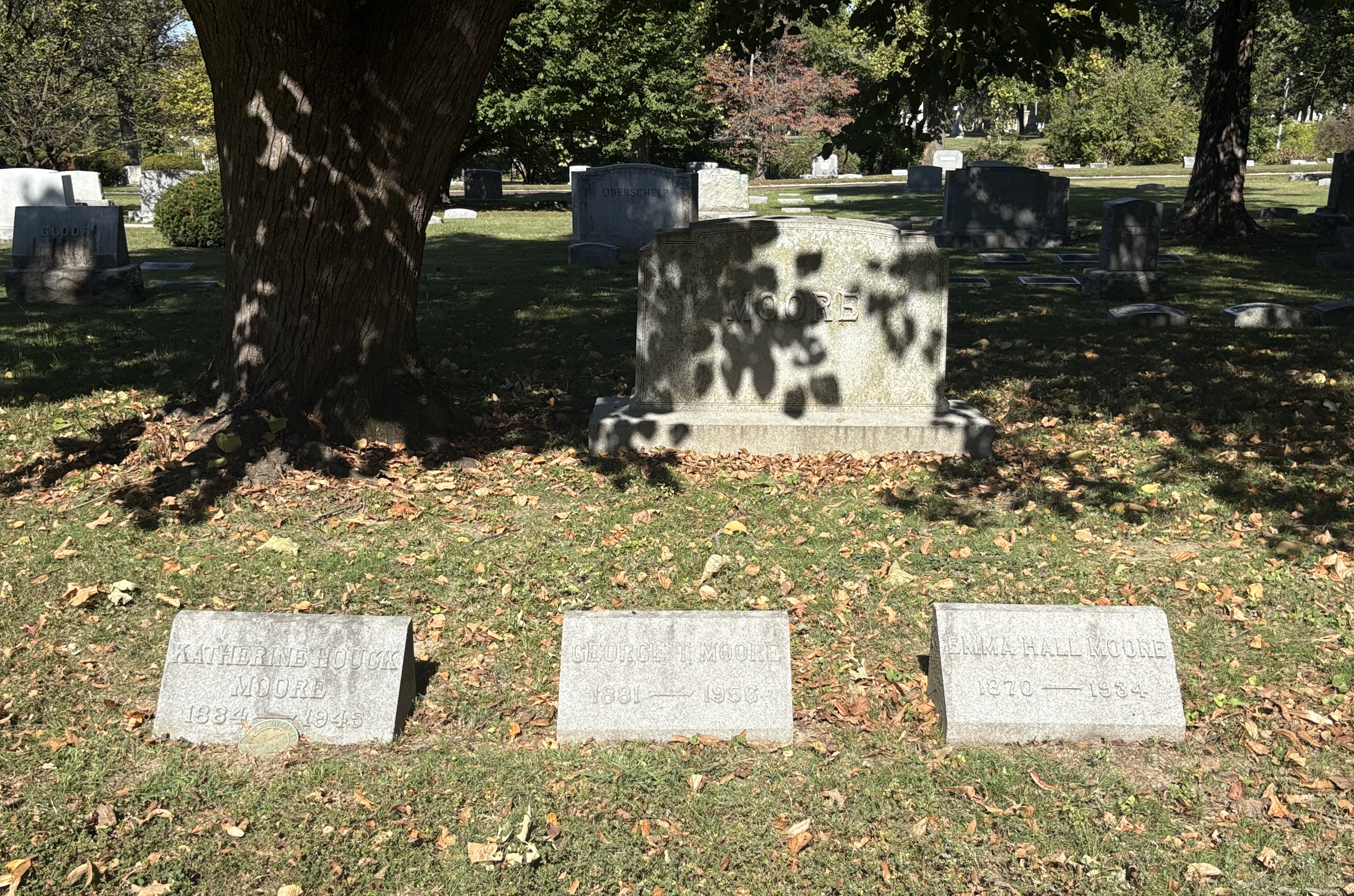
Moore's grave at Bellefontaine Cemetery

He died at his home in St. Louis on November 27, 1956, and was buried at Bellefontaine Cemetery.
