= Orchid hunting =

Search for wild orchid plants

Orchid hunting is the search for orchid plants in the wild. The orchid plants are usually acquired for the commercial market, where there was, and still is, significant demand for these unusual flowering plants.

== The Victorian era ==
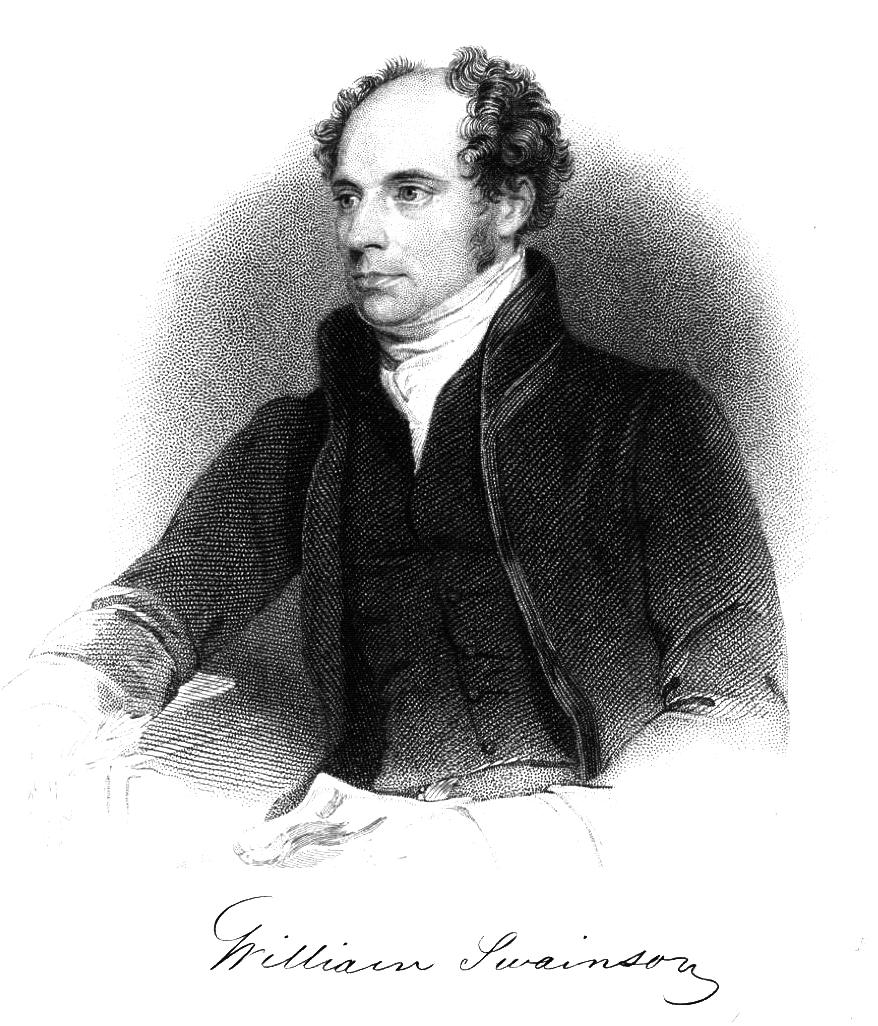
William Swainson, British ornithologist precursor of orchid hunting.

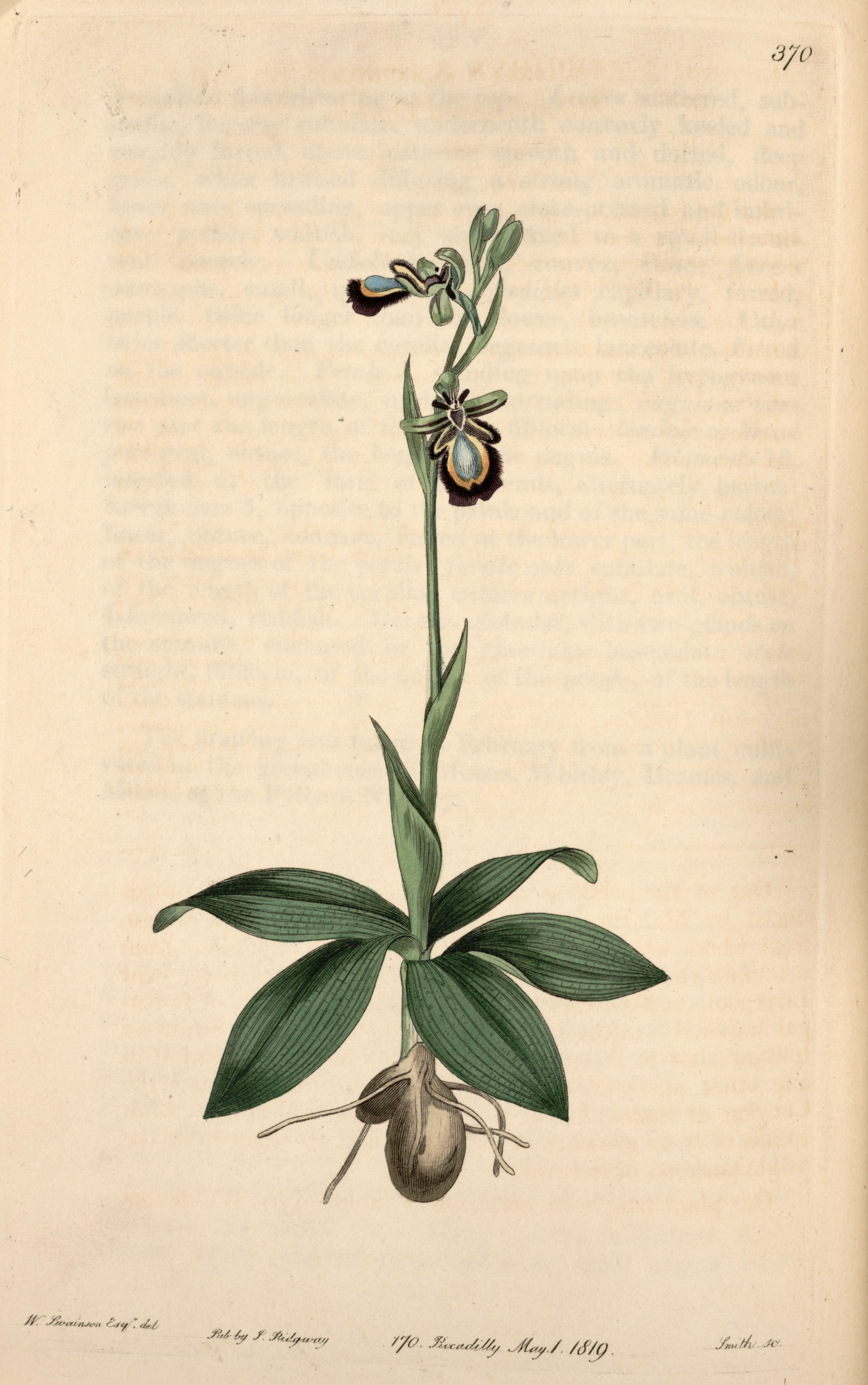
Illustration of Ophrys speculum probably painted by William Swainson

In 1818, William Swainson was collecting plants in Rio de Janeiro. He sent a box of tropical plants he had acquired to London. As a packing material he used orchids, which he believed were parasitic plants. Surprisingly, one of the orchids bloomed on arrival, and Londoners were astonished by the unusual shape and colors of the flower. That single flower triggered "orchid fever", which resulted in many deaths in pursuit of the plants. However, there is some evidence that this conventional story about using specimens of Cattleya labiata as packing material is just a myth - Swainson actually saw exceptionally showy flowers of this orchid and understood its real value. And upon arrival to Barnet, orchids were provided with proper care

About half of the orchid plants sent to Europe did not survive the trip. The demand grew, the plants became more and more expensive, and the profession of orchid hunter was created. Orchid hunters faced tropical diseases, wild animals and venomous snakes, floods, indigenous peoples, and often fierce competition with each other.

In 1901, eight orchid hunters went to look for rare orchids in the Philippines. One of the hunters was eaten by a tiger, another had oil spilled on him and was burned alive, and five others vanished completely. The man who survived the ordeal collected 7,000 orchid specimens.

Another group of orchid hunters in Papua New Guinea were captured and held hostage. Two members of the party were beheaded before Indonesian troops came to their rescue. Colombia is said to be one of the best places to hunt for orchids, but it also used to be one of the hardest places to survive the hunt. William Arnold drowned in the fast and wild Orinoco River while on a collecting expedition; David Bowman died from dysentery; and yellow fever killed Gustavo Wallis in the Andean mountains.

Albert Millican was both a painter and orchid hunter. He knew that hunting for the orchids was a dangerous business. He wrote about his expedition's supplies:

I provided myself with a stock of knives, cutlasses, revolvers, rifle.

The competition between the hunters was intense. William Arnold got into a confrontation with another orchid hunter which almost ended up in a duel. When Arnold wrote about this to his employer, he was ordered to follow the other man, collect the same specimens he did, and try to urinate on the other man's collection in order to kill his orchids. No matter how homesick and lonely the orchid hunters were, they never made friends with their rivals.

Wilhelm Micholitz was one of the best orchid hunters. Once the boat he was on caught fire; the orchids he had collected perished, but Micholitz survived. He cabled the news to his employer Sander, and was ordered to return and to recollect, despite the fact that the rainy season made the collection of orchids all but impossible. One entry in Micholitz's diary was made in Bogotá:

I do not know what I would not give to be back in the well-ordered British or Dutch Colonies in the East, to be able to do work in peace and comparative comfort.

It was not surprising that Micholitz dreamed about peace after witnessing a horrific fight between locals in Papua New Guinea. The fight left many wounded and dead, three of whom were also beheaded, and one was missing his hands, feet and penis. Those locals were supposed to be helping Micholitz with his orchid search, but after the fight they refused to continue.

Orchid hunters who survived their ordeals came home with incredible stories. They claimed that cannibals on the Solomon Islands tortured their human sacrifices with the most beautiful blooming orchids placed around them so that the victims were able to see the color of the flowers growing richer from their own blood. Fosterman, who was hunting for orchids in Brazil, described his adventure in the "village of the demon flowers". He claimed that the orchids his party found there were the most beautiful he had ever seen, but he said that the flowers had a very bad smell, an odor that literally was strong enough to kill people. His men circled this village and saw abundant orchids everywhere, but because the smell was so deadly, the flowers were simply impossible to reach, like a lovely mirage.

From 15 February to 16 March 2003, Royal Botanic Gardens, Kew ran their ninth orchid festival with a theme: "In Search of Paradise". The exhibit included letters, diaries and paintings on the theme of "daring tales of Victorian exploration" and orchid hunting.

== Modern orchid hunting ==
Modern orchid hunting is not without its dangers. Tom Hart Dyke, a plant hunter who follows the tradition of the Victorian and Edwardian orchid hunters, was held in 2000 by kidnappers thought to be FARC guerillas in the Darién Gap between Panama and Colombia, while hunting for rare orchids, a plant for which he has a particular passion. He and his travel companion, Paul Winder, were held captive for nine months, and threatened with death. Hart Dyke kept his morale up by creating a design for a garden containing plants collected on his trips, laid out in the shape of a world map, the plants being positioned according to the respective continents of their origin.
