= Paul H. Allen =

American botanist

Paul Hamilton Allen
- Born: August 29, 1911; Enid, Oklahoma, United States
- Died: November 14, 1963 (aged 52); New Orleans, Louisiana
- Scientific career
- Author abbrev. (botany): P.H.Allen

Paul Hamilton Allen (1911–1963) was an American botanist noted for his work on the ecology of Central America, orchid systematics and economically important species including bananas. He was married to the former Dorothy Osdieck of Kirkwood, Missouri.

Allen was born in Enid, Oklahoma. With only a secondary school education, he became a student apprentice at the Missouri Botanical Garden in St. Louis, Missouri.

== Panama ==
Beginning in late 1934 Allen accompanied Carroll William Dodge, Julian Steyermark, and A. A. Hunter on a 6-month collecting expedition in Panama. In late 1936, he returned to Panama as the third manager the Missouri Botanical Garden's Tropical Station which had been founded in 1927 by a donation of 7,000 plants from Charles W. Powell's orchid garden: Powell being the Tropical Station's first manager. When Allen made his trip to Panama as a part of the 1934-35 expedition, A. A. Hunter had taken over as the Tropical Station's second manager and remained in that position as well as Postmaster in Balboa until his death in 1935 at which time Hunter's wife, Mary, took over the Tropical Station's management until a suitable replacement could be found; Allen was selected as that replacement. Allen was the Tropical Stations's third and final manager and filled the position until March 1, 1939, when it was transferred to the Canal Zone Government. "During its almost 13 years of existence, the Tropical Station supplied the greenhouses in Saint Louis with a constant flow of living plants." On March 1, 1939, Allen was jointly hired by the Health Department and the Canal Zone Experiment Gardens. He was to devote five days a week to his work with the Health Department and one day each week, plus such extra time as was required, to outline and supervise the work at the reorganized Balboa Orchid Gardens which was made a branch of the Canal Zone Experiment Gardens." On September 21, 1939, Allen was transferred from the Health Department to fill the position of Supervisor of Culture, which had been vacant for three years. Allen's work soon expanded to include satisfying the US Army's horticulture requirements for its expansion program in the defense of the Canal. "Between 1937 and 1947, under the auspices of the Missouri Botanical Garden, he was part of 17 expeditions to the forests of Panama and collected over 7,000 species of plants. Allen was 'one of the most meticulous collectors ever to work in Central America.' It would be impossible to name all new species of Orchidaceae that were discovered by Allen and all of those that were named in his honor."

During World War II, Allen was one of the few American botanists with extensive tropical experience. He prepared a paper on the "poisonous and injurious plants of Panama" which was published in the American Journal of Tropical Medicine in 1943. He joined the United States Rubber Development Corporation and worked on the collection of rubber from wild Hevea trees in the Colombian Amazon.

After the end of the World War II Allen completed an account of the Orchidaceae (orchid family) for the Flora of Panama before joining the United Fruit Company in Costa Rica. This led to the production of his book The Rain Forests of Golfo Dulce. He served as the director of the Fairchild Tropical Botanic Garden from 1953 to 1954, before returning to Central America to teach at the United Fruit Company's Escuela Agricola Panamericana near Tegucigalpa in Honduras. Allen then conducted a survey of the forest resources of El Salvador and established the Paul C. Standley Herbarium. In 1959 he returned to the United Fruit Company's research department, where he served as the director of the Lancetilla Experimental Station.

In 1959 the United Fruit Company launched a major banana breeding project. Allen and Dutch botanist J. J. Ochse were selected to lead collecting expeditions to Southeast Asia and the Western Pacific. Between 1959 and 1961 they collected nearly 800 accessions of wild and cultivated species and varieties of bananas from Taiwan, the Philippines, Indonesia, Malaysia, Singapore, Thailand and Sri Lanka. This collection was described by botanist and plant collector Wilson Popenoe as "one of the grandest and most successful in the history of plant introduction".

Allen then returned to Honduras where he worked on sorting and classifying the collections. He also compiled annotated check-lists of hundreds of common names. Much of this work was ongoing at the time of his death in 1963. He died of cancer in 1963, at the height of his career. His collection of banana germplasm remains the basis of the breeding program of the Fundación Hondureña de Investigación Agrícola.

Allen authored taxonomic descriptions of 73 species, subspecies and varieties of plants, especially in the orchid family. Thousands of herbarium specimens were submitted by Allen for study and numerous species from different families are named in his honor.

Allen's papers are held by the Hunt Institution for Botanical Documentation at Carnegie Mellon University, together with artwork by his wife, Dorothy.

A species of Central American salamander, Oedipina alleni, is named in honor of Paul H. Allen.
