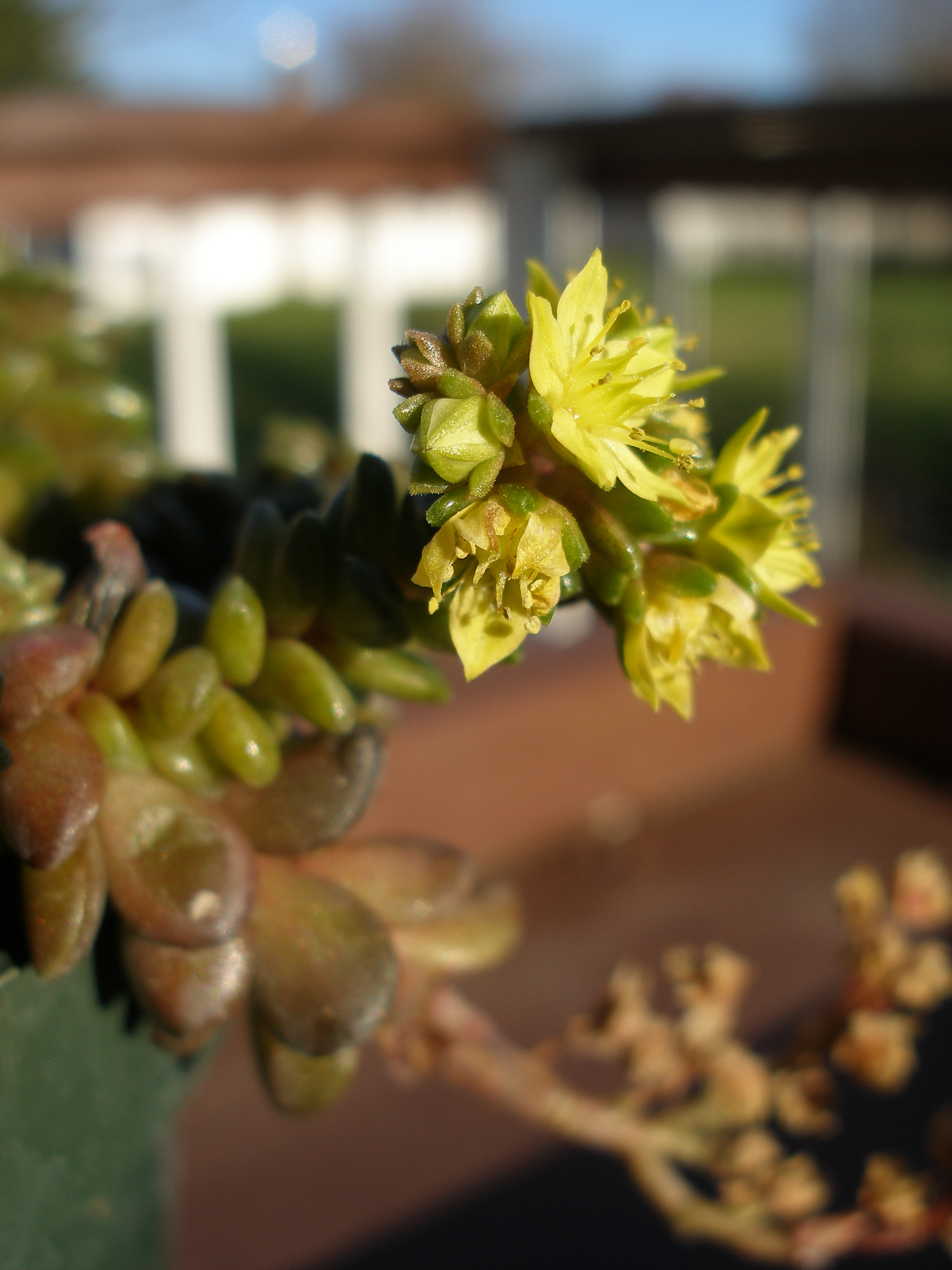
- × Cremnosedum 'Little Gem' flower

Scientific classification
- Kingdom: Plantae
- Clade: Tracheophytes
- Clade: Angiosperms
- Clade: Eudicots
- Order: Saxifragales
- Family: Crassulaceae
- Genus: × Cremnosedum; Kimnach & G.Lyon

= × Cremnosedum =

Hybrid genus of succulents

× Cremnosedum is a hybrid genus produced from crosses involving the genera Cremnophila and Sedum. This bigeneric name was first published in 1981 with the introduction of the cultivar 'Little Gem' in an article advertising plants offered by the International Succulent Institute in the Cactus and Succulent Journal, the journal of the Cactus and Succulent Society of America. The 'Little Gem' cultivar was made by Mrs. and Mr. Robert Grim of San Jose, California and is described as producing a low mat of small rosettes. It prefers direct sunlight and produces small yellow flowers on short stalks.

'Little Gem' is a hybrid of Cremnophila nutans and Sedum humifusum, though the taxonomy of Cremnophila has been questioned and it is sometimes placed within the genus Sedum, thus rendering the intergeneric hybrid name unnecessary. Other cultivars have been recognized, such as 'Crocodile', which has tessellated stem markings that resemble crocodile skin. However, the Illustrated Handbook of Succulent Plants published in 2003 noted that only 'Little Gem' is the only formally named hybrid.

== Gallery ==
× Cremnosedum 'Penn Ar Ru'

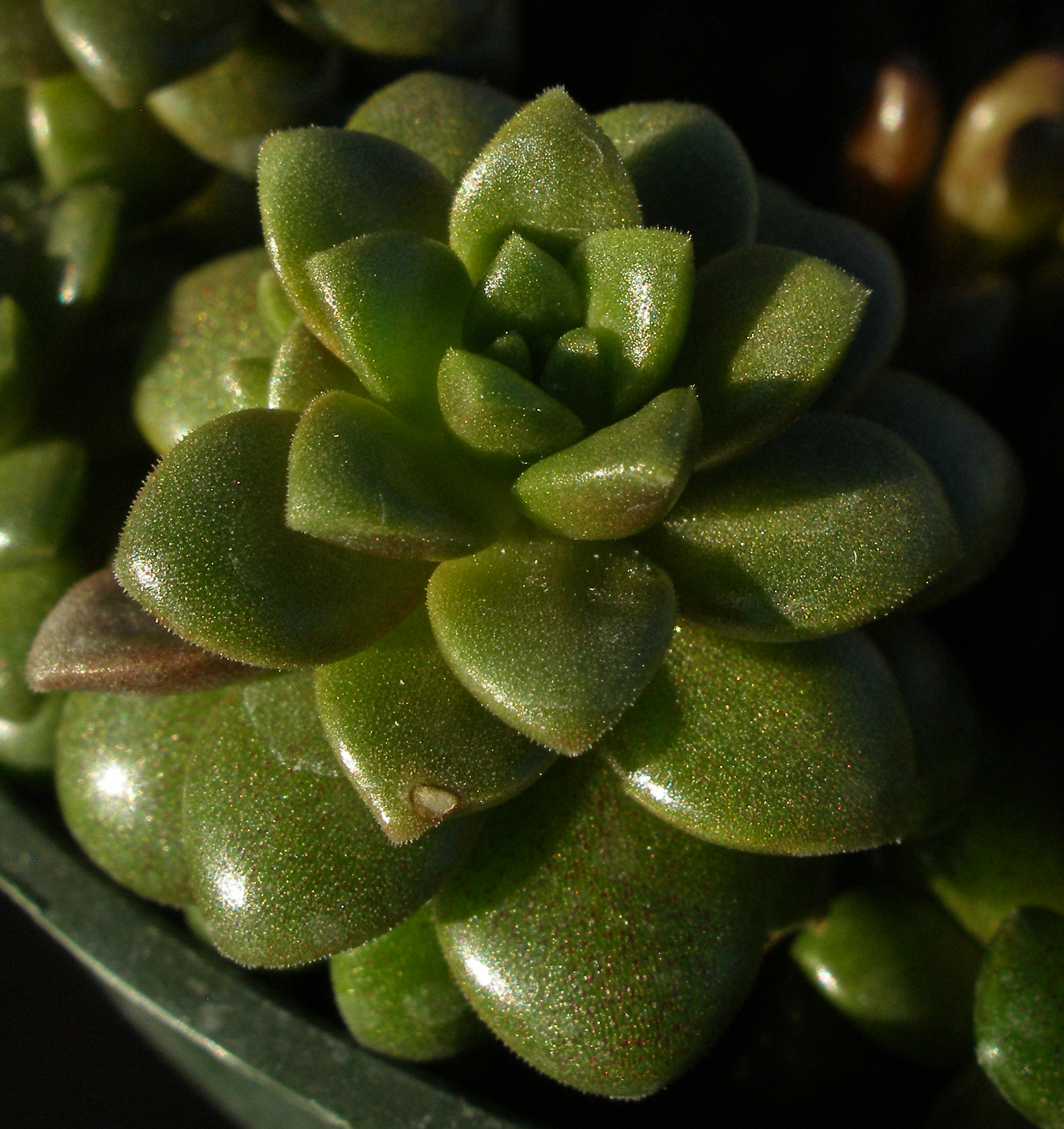
× Cremnosedum 'Little Gem'
