= Lullingstone Country Park =

Country park in Kent, England

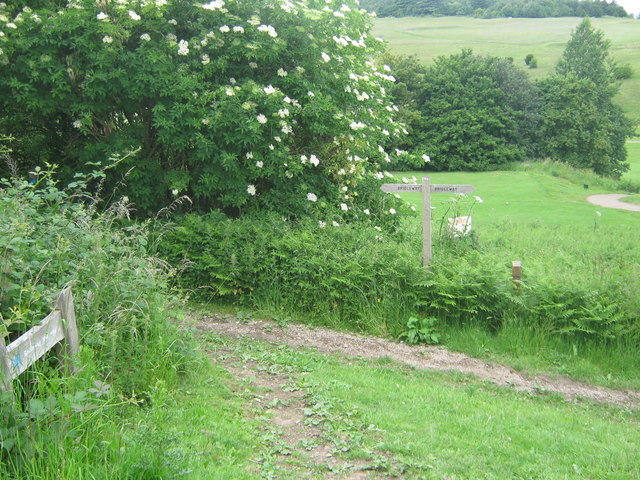
- Interactive map of Lullingstone Country Park
- Coordinates: 51°11′31″N 0°14′51″E
- Area: 186 hectares (460 acres)
- Created: 1960s
- Operator: Kent County Council
- Open: 7 days a week, dawn until dusk
- Website: Lullingstone Country Park

Lullingstone Park
- Site of Special Scientific Interest
- Location of Lullingstone Park.
- Area of search: Kent
- Grid reference: TQ 513 640
- Interest: Biological
- Area: 66.4 hectares (164 acres)
- Notification date: 1989
- Location map: Magic Map

Lullingstone Country Park is near Eynsford, in Kent, England. A former deer park of a large estate, it was later sold to become an open-space and woodland park. The park and Lullingstone Castle are a Scheduled Monument, and an area of 66.4-hectare (164-acre) is a biological Site of Special Scientific Interest Kent.

== History ==
This 460-acre country park is between Eynsford and Shoreham; it was formerly a medieval deer park, and part of the estate and Manor of Lullingstone, which was mentioned in the Domesday Survey. In 1934, much of the park was sold to Kemp Town Brewery, Brighton who later sold it to Kent County Council in 1938.

In 1944, during the 2nd World War, a decoy airfield was sited in the park, and Lullingstone Castle was used by the army. The Lullingstone estate was also hit by various German bombs; most craters have been covered up. One crater is now hidden by trees.

In the mid-1960s, Kent County Council leased the park to Dartford Rural District Council, who created an 18-hole golf course in the park. Later in the 20th century, a 9-hole course was also added. This still occupies the western and central section of the park. The park is currently leased by Sevenoaks District Council, but the park is maintained by Kent County Council. Lullingstone Castle and its grounds remain in private ownership under the Hart-Dykes.

In 1964, Summerhouse Knoll (a grass hill) within the park was dug up by Crayford Archaeological Research Group who found 1st-century pottery.

Some of the pollards in the wood are over 400 years old, and it is important for invertebrates, lichens, breeding birds and fungi. Over 340 beetle species have been recorded, including two which are nationally rare.

== Geography ==
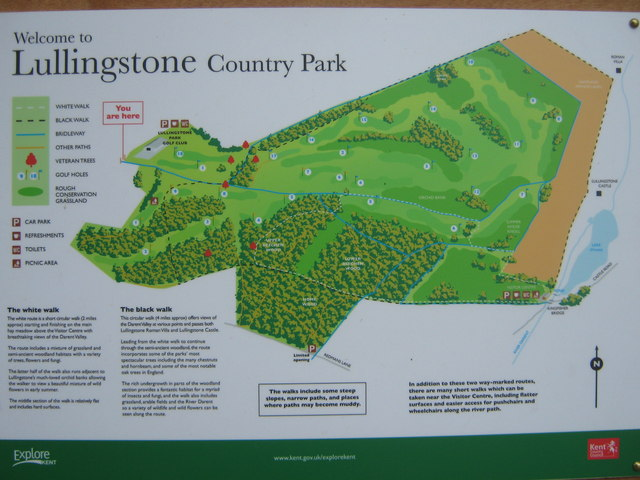
Lullingstone Country Park Information Board

The park is well renowned for its collection of ancient trees within the park. These include 300 veteran oaks, beeches, hornbeams, ash (Fraxinus), and sweet chestnut trees. These include specimens estimated to be around 500 years old. As well as the woodlands, the park has large meadow land areas, with plentiful species of plants within, including orchids and other native wildflowers and butterflies.

The River Darent flows through the eastern valley section of the park, alongside the Darent Valley Path (long-distance path). Sections of the river are widened to create lakes and ponds. These also attract wildlife including, kingfishers, herons, grass snakes, dragonflies and damselflies.

Several marked trails exist within the park. The White Woodland Walk is a 2-mile heading through Beechen Wood and past the Orchid Bank. The Black Lullingstone Loop is a 4-mile perimeter walk, via Beechen Wood (a Site of Special Scientific Interest), passing Lullingstone Roman Villa, Lullingstone Castle. It passes many of the ancient trees in the park. The Red Discovery Trail is a 1.5-mile child-friendly activity trail. The Blue Horse Trail is 4 miles. Other footpaths including public footpaths also exist within the park.

The country park held a Kent Big Weekend Event during March 2011 in the grounds of the Country Park.

The park also is accredited with a Green Flag Award by Natural England.

== See also ==
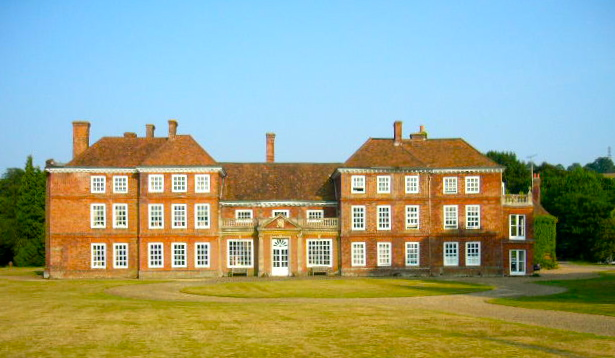
Lullingstone Castle

Nearby, is the 15th-century Lullingstone Castle and Tom Hart Dyke's World of Garden Plants. Also, within 1 mile of the country park is another less visited Park and woodland of Preston Hill Country Park.

== How to get there ==
From Eynsford, follow the A225 towards Otford. The park is on the right, after the entrance to Lullingstone Castle. Another entrance is via footpaths through Beechens Wood from Redmans Lane (bordering the park on the south).
