= Tom Hart Dyke =

British horticulturist and author

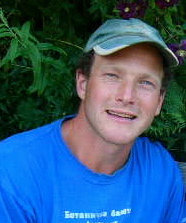
- Born: 12 April 1976 (age 50)
- Occupations: Horticulturist, author, plant hunter

Thomas Guy Hart Dyke (born 12 April 1976) is an English horticulturist, author and plant hunter from the Hart Dyke family. He is the son and heir of Guy and Sarah Hart Dyke at the family seat of Lullingstone Castle, Eynsford, Kent.

He is the designer of the World Garden of Plants located on the property. The World Garden contains approximately 8,000 species of plants, many collected by Hart Dyke from their native environments. He presented an episode of Great British Garden Revival in 2013. Tom Hart Dyke is a patron of the charity the British Cactus & Succulent Society.

== Early life ==
Hart Dyke attended Anthony Roper County Primary School in Eynsford and then transferred to St Michael's School in Otford. He attended Stanbridge Earls in Hampshire until age seventeen and then entered Sparsholt College Hampshire, near Winchester, where he studied tree surgery and forestry.

In an interview in 2006, Hart Dyke credits his grandmother as having first interested him in plants, when he was three.

== Kidnapping ==
Hart Dyke follows a tradition of Victorian and Edwardian British plant hunters, such as Francis Masson, who undertook risks to acquire rare species of plant. In 2000, Hart Dyke was kidnapped by suspected FARC guerrillas in the Darién Gap between Panama and Colombia while hunting for rare orchids, a plant for which he has a particular passion.

He and his travel companion, Paul Winder, were held captive for nine months and threatened with death. He occupied himself by creating a design for a garden containing plants collected on his trips, laid out in the shape of a world map according to their continent of origin.

Hart Dyke wrote about his experiences in Colombia in his book, The Cloud Garden. The story of his kidnapping ordeal was dramatised in the Sky1 documentary series My Holiday Hostage Hell.

== World Garden of Plants ==
On his return home, Hart Dyke put his design into practice in the family's Victorian herb garden. The story of the creation of The World Garden of Plants was the subject of a BBC2 6-episode series, "Save Lullingstone Castle" (KEO Films) in 2006. This was followed by a second six-episode series, "Return To Lullingstone Castle" on BBC2 in 2007.

In May 2006, Hart Dyke brought an Australian Eucalyptus caesia plant, common name Silver Princess, to flower for the first time in the UK. He was inspired by orchids at his first school, St Michaels, Otford, Kent.

The garden features include the Hot & Spikey house which contains over 1,000 varieties of cacti, succulents & bromeliads from all over the world. Hart Dyke is a patron of the charity the British Cactus & Succulent Society.

Hart Dyke was featured in the PBS Nova programme in 2002, Orchid Hunter that documented his return to hunting rare orchids in dangerous terrain in another politically unstable area in Irian Jaya in the rainforests of Western New Guinea.

== Personal life ==
Hart Dyke is first cousin of the English comedian Miranda Hart and nephew of Captain David Hart Dyke, who was commanding officer of HMS Coventry when it was sunk by the Argentinians in the 1982 Falklands conflict.

== See also ==
- List of kidnappings
- List of solved missing person cases (2000s)
- Orchid hunters
