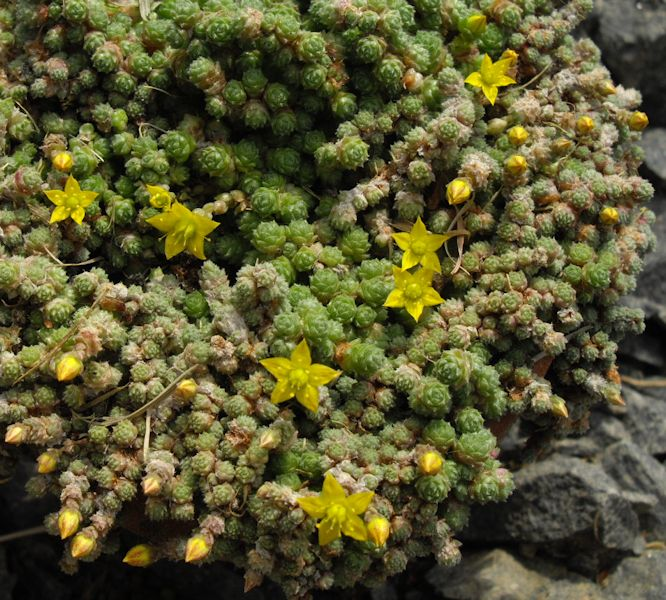
- Flowers are 9 mm (0.35 in) wide
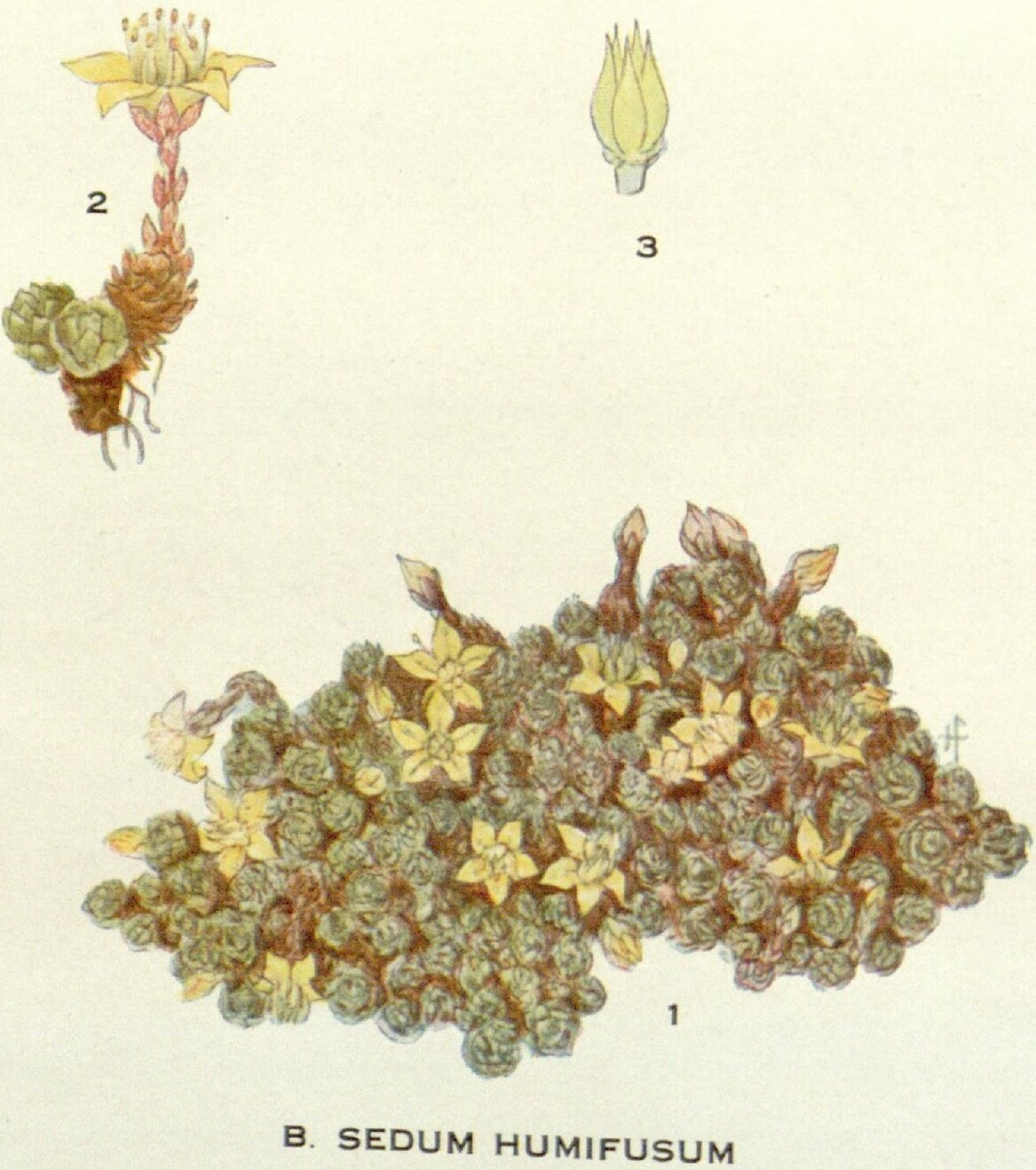
- Botanical illustration by Mary Emily Eaton

Scientific classification
- Kingdom: Plantae
- Clade: Tracheophytes
- Clade: Angiosperms
- Clade: Eudicots
- Order: Saxifragales
- Family: Crassulaceae
- Genus: Sedum
- Species: S. humifusum

Binomial name
- Sedum humifusum Rose

= Sedum humifusum =

Species of plant

Sedum humifusum, the miniature Mexican stonecrop, is a species of flowering plant in the family Crassulaceae. It is native to the Mexican states of Guanajuato, Querétaro, and Hidalgo. A creeping perennial reaching 1 cm (0.4 in), it is available from commercial suppliers, and is hardy to USDA Zone 9.

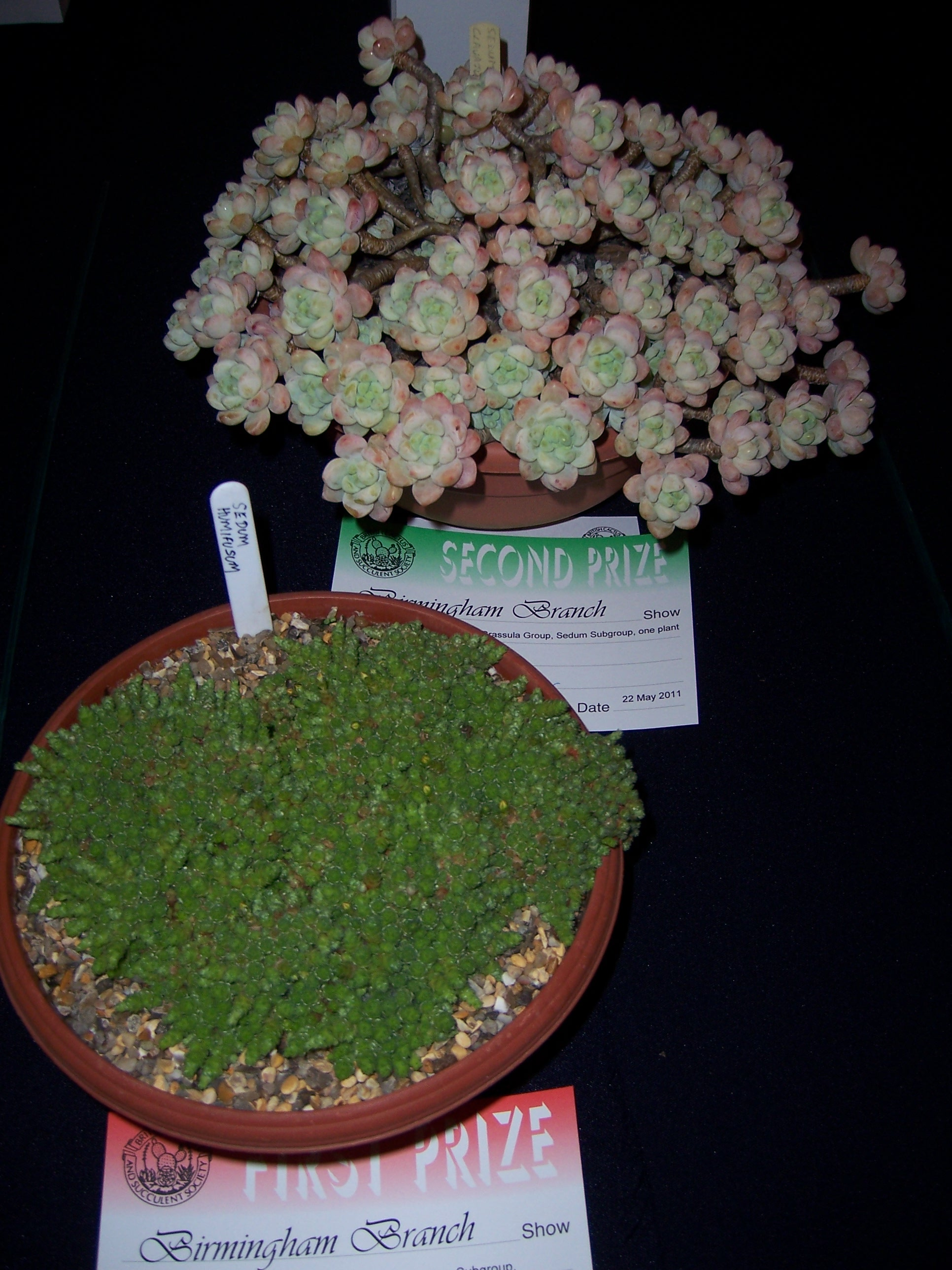
Winning First Prize at a British Cactus & Succulent Society show. Note minute size compared to Sedum clavatum (top).
