= Lullingstone Castle =

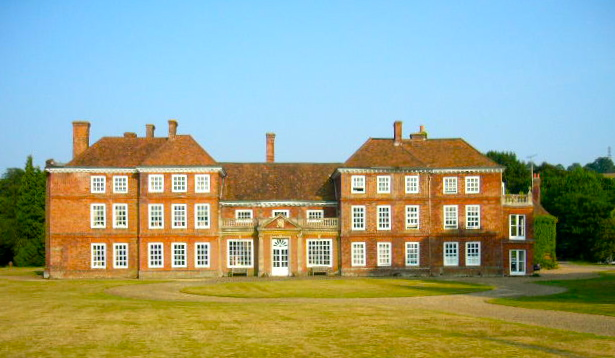
- Lullingstone Castle (the main house)

- Location within Kent
- 51°21′31″N 0°11′45″E
- Type: Manor house
- Location: Lullingstone, Kent

History
- Built: 1543-1580
- Built for: Sir Percyvall Hart
- Rebuilt: 18th century

Site notes
- Architectural styles: Tudor and Queen Anne
- Owner: Hart-Dyke family
- Website: lullingstonecastle.co.uk

Listed Building – Grade II*
- Official name: Lullingstone Castle
- Designated: 1 August 1952
- Reference no.: 1222202

Listed Building – Grade I
- Official name: The Gatehouse to Lullingstone Castle
- Designated: 1 June 1967
- Reference no.: 1217173

National Register of Historic Parks and Gardens
- Official name: Lullingstone Castle
- Designated: 18 March 2004
- Reference no.: 1001687

Lullingstone Castle is a historic manor house, set in an estate in the village of Lullingstone and the civil parish of Eynsford in the English county of Kent. It has been inhabited by members of the Hart Dyke family for twenty generations including current owner Tom Hart Dyke.

== History ==
Mentioned in the Domesday Book of 1086, the manor of Lullingstone was acquired in 1279 by Gregory de Rokesley, who served eight terms as Lord Mayor of London. It passed down in the Rokesley family for several generations before being sold to the Peche family. The present manor house was started in 1497 by Sir John Peche, High Sheriff of Kent for 1494-95 and later (1509) joint Lord Deputy of Calais. Henry VIII and Anne Boleyn were regular visitors to the house.

In 1543 the estate passed by marriage to his nephew, Sir Percyvall Hart, chief steward and knight harbinger to King Henry VIII, King Edward VI, Queen Mary I, and Queen Elizabeth I. He died in 1580 and the estate passed to his grandson, Sir Percival Hart. In May 1603 he sent fish and poultry from the Lullingstone estate to King James at Theobalds. The house passed to his great-grandson, yet another Percival Hart, who was High Sheriff of Kent in 1706, who remodelled the house and renamed it Lullingstone Castle. He left one daughter, Anne, who in turn married John Bluet and Sir Thomas Dyke.

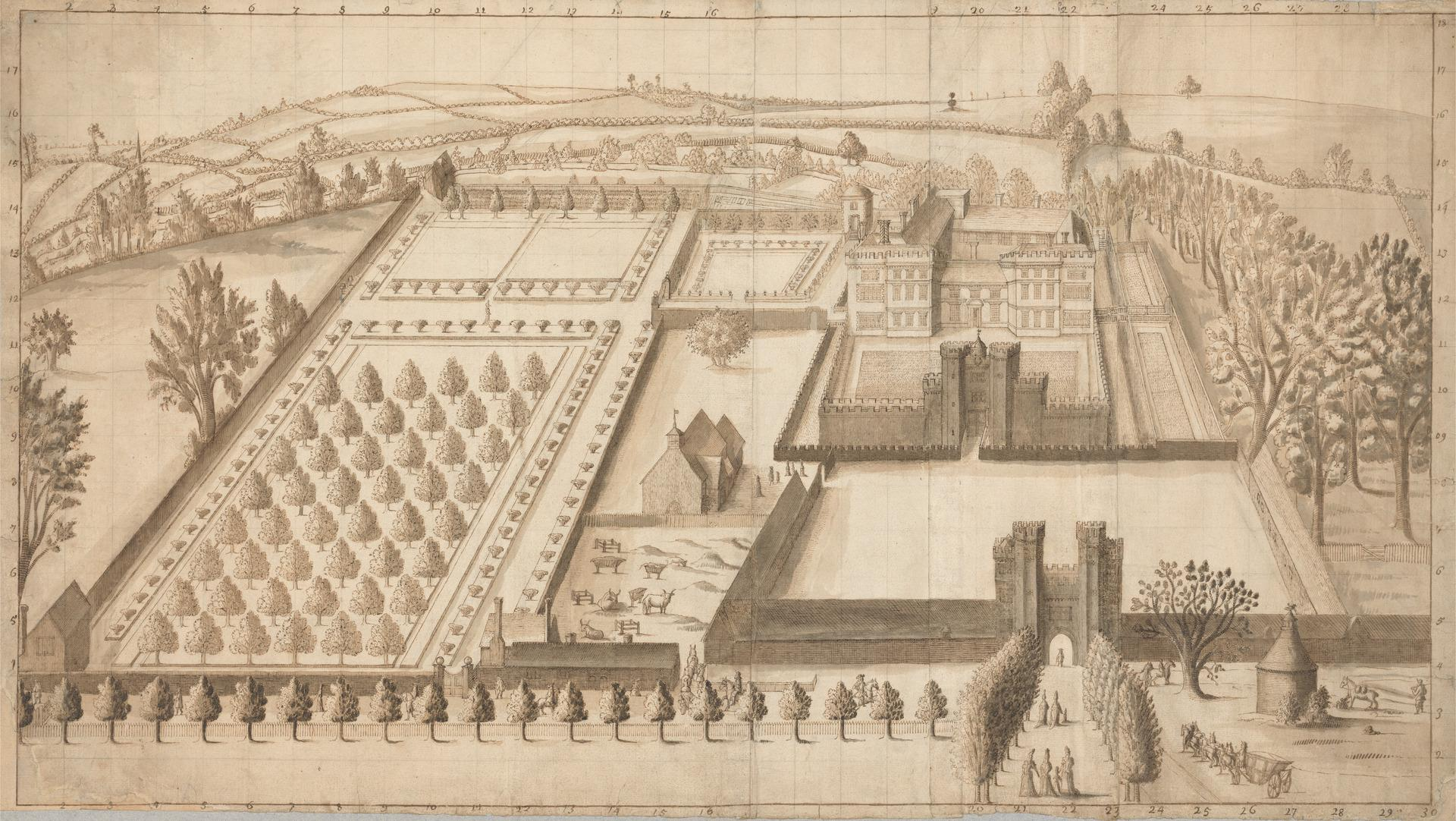
A drawing of Lullingstone Castle c.1670 at the Yale Center for British Art

In 1934 the estate was sold to Kemp Town Brewery, who resold it to Kent County Council in 1938. It was occupied by the Army during World War II. In the mid-1960s Dartford Rural District Council laid out a golf course in the grounds and created a public park. The house itself remains in the hands of the Hart Dyke family.

In 2011, the Castle was the location for the Compare the Market advert 'Tough decision', featuring meerkats Sergei and Aleksandr.

== Architecture ==
=== Gatehouse ===
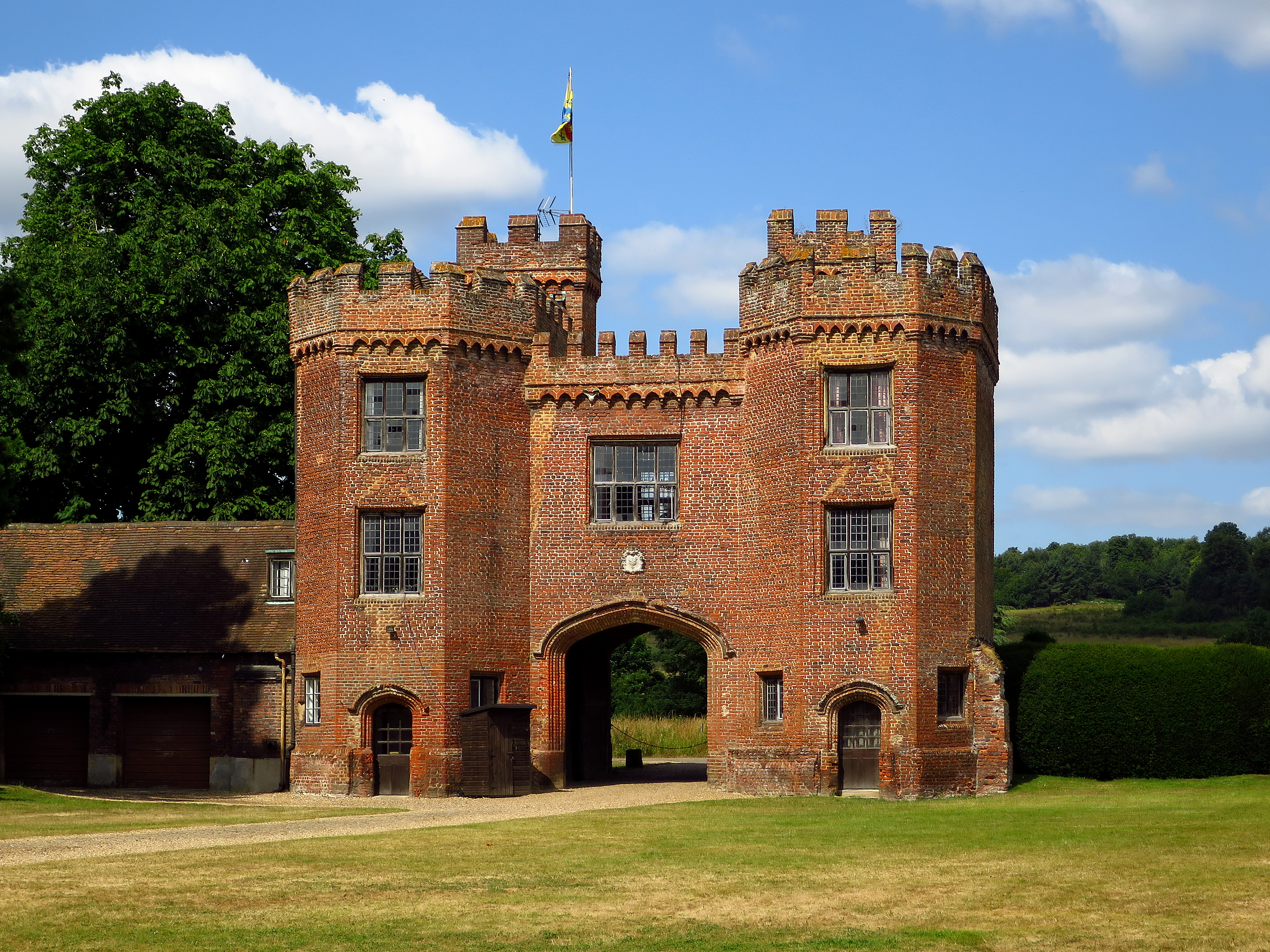
Outer gatehouse to Lullingstone Castle

The house used to have two gatehouses, an outer gatehouse, which remains, and an inner gatehouse, which was demolished in the 18th century. The outer gatehouse was constructed in the late 16th century but may be on earlier foundations laid by Sir John Peche, making it potentially one of the first in England built entirely of brick. It is a Grade I listed building.

=== House ===
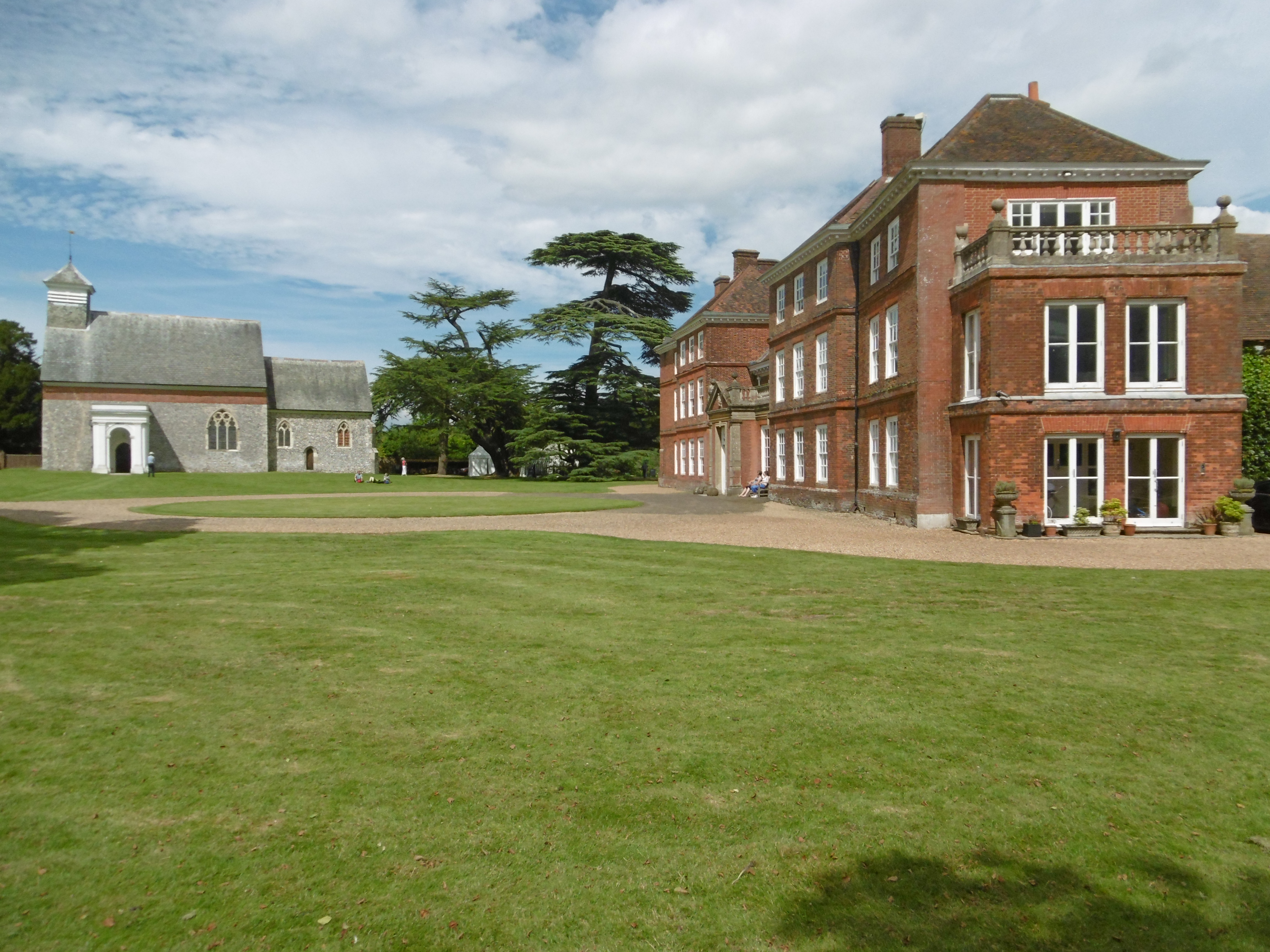
The main house and St Botolph's Church

The house, now known as Lullingstone Castle was built between 1543 and 1580 by Sir Percyvall Hart as Lullingstone House. It is a Grade II* listed building in red brick and of three storeys. Traces of the original 16th-century building can be seen in the north and east fronts, between which is the remodelled two-storey Queen Anne entrance front of the later Percival Hart and Sir John Dixon Dyke.

== Estate ==
The surrounding 120-acre (49 ha) park was previously a fenced deer park, with the castle serving as a hunting lodge. The grounds are located on the River Darent and hidden within it are Queen Anne's bathhouse and an icehouse dating from the 18th century. Most of the grounds of the former estate now constitute Lullingstone Country Park and are Grade II listed.

The park contains some of the oldest oak trees in Britain, wildflowers, a church (St Botolph's) of Norman and possibly earlier foundation, later restored and rebuilt, a walled garden, and (at one time) Lullingstone Roman Villa.

Zoe Dyke created the Lullingstone Silk Farm here which was visited by Queen Mary and as a result it created silk for the coronation robe of King George VI. The farm has since moved away but has produced silk for other important Royal events including the wedding dress of Princess Elizabeth and the wedding dress of Lady Diana Spencer.

The walled garden, previously a herb garden designed by Eleanour Sinclair Rohde, was converted in the first decade of the 21st century into the World Garden of Plants by the Castle's current owner (and 20th generation of the Hart Dykes), plant hunter Tom Hart Dyke. In 2000, Hart Dyke was kidnapped by guerrillas in the Darién Gap, straddling southern Panama and northwestern Colombia, while hunting for rare orchids; he designed the garden, laid out as a miniature map of the world, to calm his fear from repeated death threats during his captivity. That conversion was the subject of the BBC2 series Save Lullingstone Castle. Hart Dyke and the World Garden were again featured in Spring 2007 on the BBC2 series, Return to Lullingstone Castle.

The garden and the castle are open to the public from April through to September.

== Gallery ==
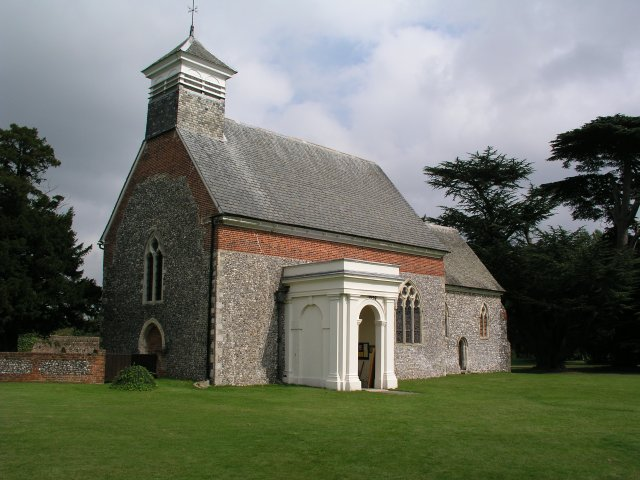
St Botolph's Church in the grounds of Lullingstone Castle

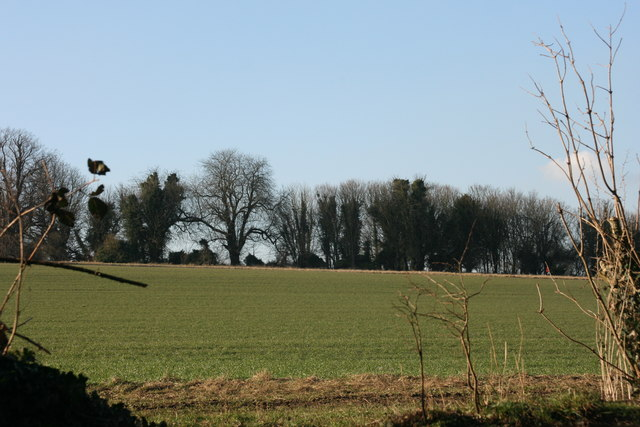
View inside Lullingstone Country Park

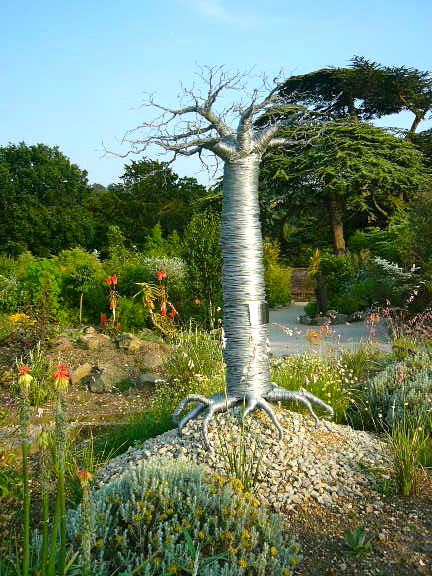
Wire baobab tree at World Garden of Plants

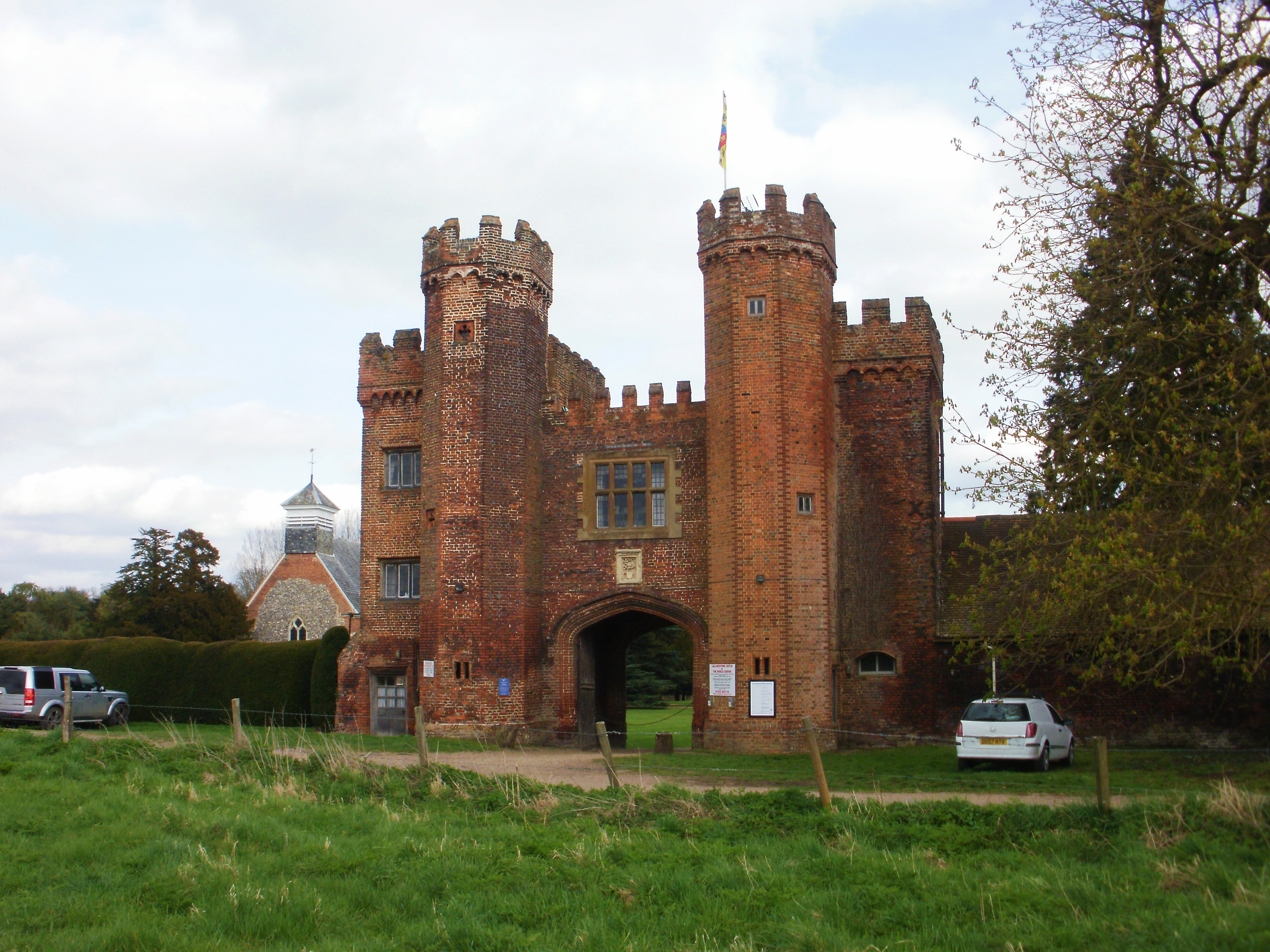
The Castle entrance

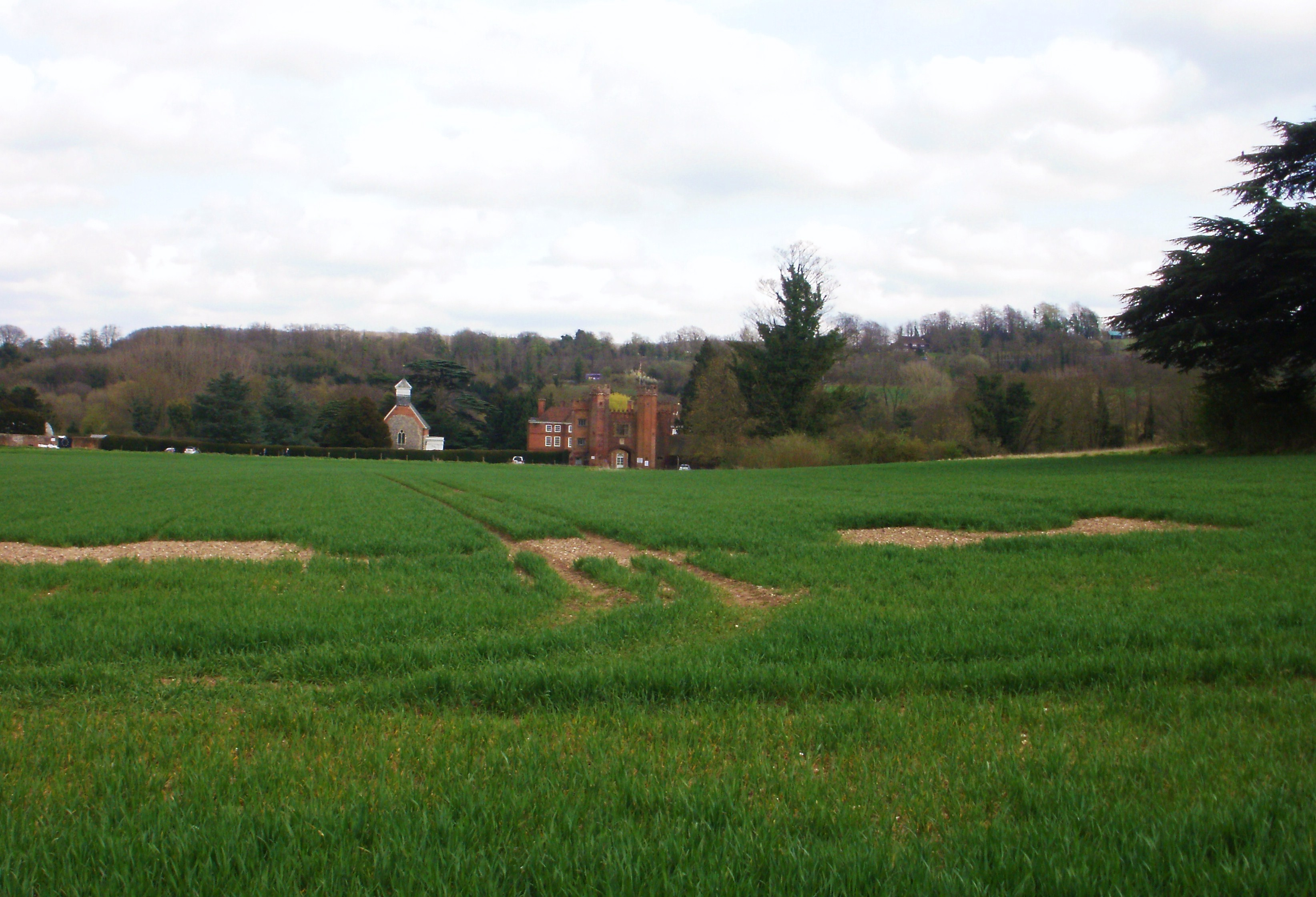
The castle in its landscape context
