= Preston Hill Country Park =

Country park in Kent, England

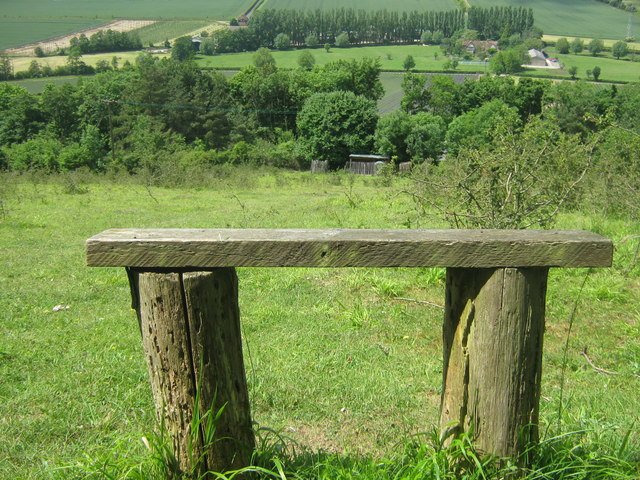
- Bench on Preston Hill
- Interactive map of Preston Hill Country Park
- Coordinates: 51°20′57″N 0°11′41″E
- Area: 232 acres (940,000 m^{2})
- Created: 1991
- Operator: Kent County Council,
- Status: Open 7 days a week, dawn until dusk

Preston Hill Country Park is in Eynsford, in Kent, England. It is a woodland and former military firing range.

Preston Hill Country Parkshown within Kent (grid reference TQ23596315)

Within the site of the park and woodland, stood Preston Hill farmhouse. This was then damaged in 1944 after a 1000 kg parachute bomb or mine was dropped, in the early hours of 22 January 1944. Three of the farmhouse occupants were killed and 8 others were injured, later the ruined farmhouse was demolished. The site was then used as a Ministry of Defence firing range (up to the 1940s); the remnants of the range can still be seen.

Since 1951 it has been a Site of Special Scientific Interest (part of 363.7 acres (1,472,000 m^{2}) Otford To Shoreham Downs site).

Preston Hill has views across the countryside from the Darenth Valley (following the River Darent) to Lullingstone Country Park. The site has 232 acres (940,000 m^{2}) of chalk grassland and woodland with many wild flowers and rare butterflies at this site of natural landscape located within the Kent Downs.

On the grasslands, a variety of butterflies including chalkhill blues and dark green fritillaries can be seen. Since the site is relatively quiet, common adders and grass snakes can also be found. The grassland is grazed occasionally by a herd of feral goats, which came from the Great Orme, near Colwyn Bay in North Wales.These are used to further encourage the growth of wildflowers.

There are paths through the woodland (called 'Preston Plantation') at the top of the hill although they are steep in places and some have become overgrown.

The park also is acreddited with a Green Flag Award by Natural England (linked with Lullingstone Country Park).

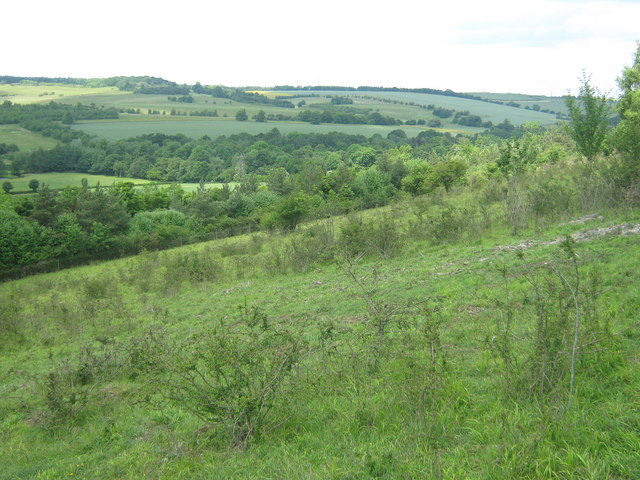
Preston Hill and Darenth Valley

== How to get there ==
Situated along A225 Station road, cross the railway (between Shoreham and Eynsford) then head up Preston Hill. The site has no official car park, but the site is only about 1 mile from Lullingstone Country Park.
