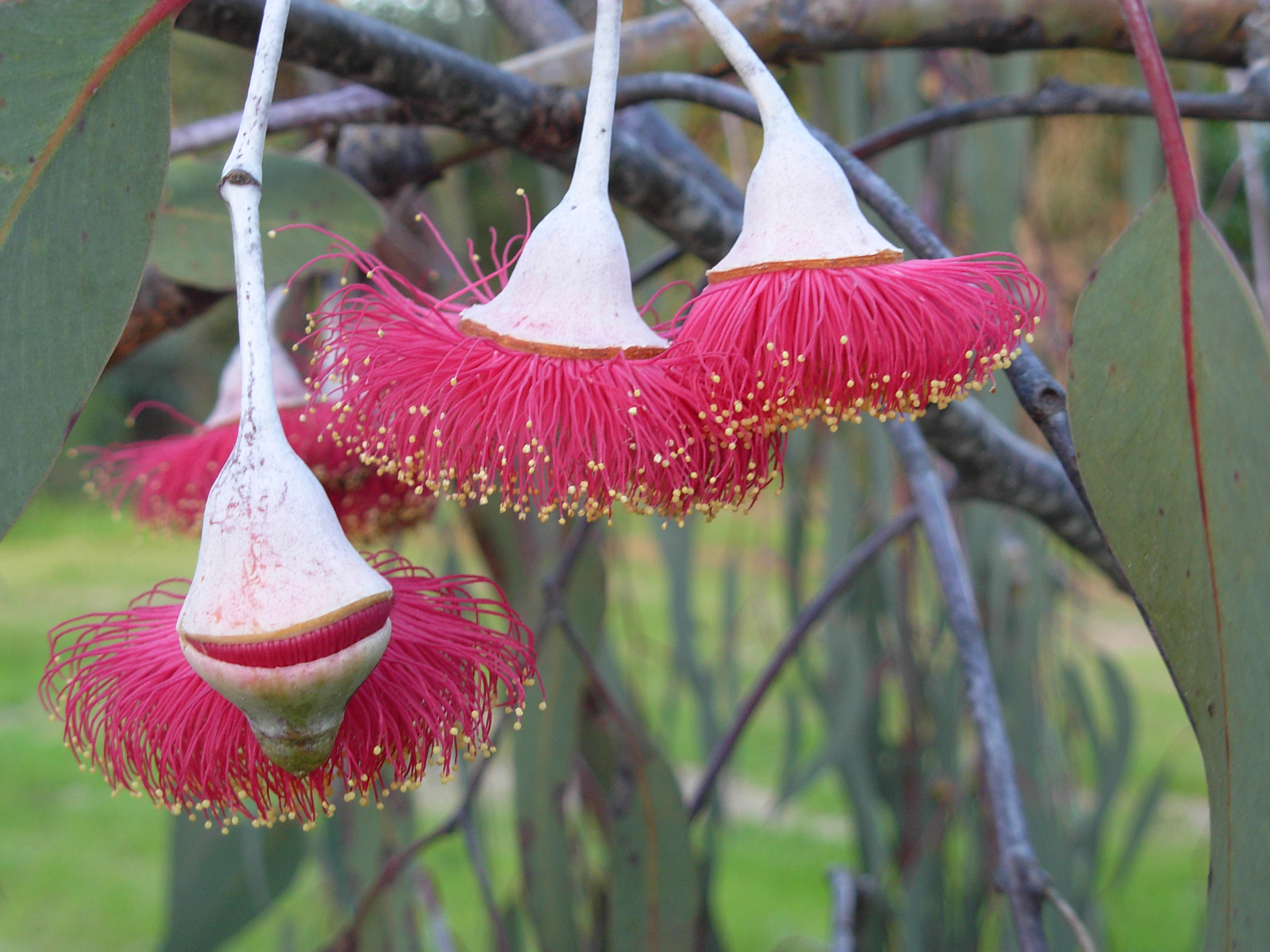

Conservation status
- Priority Four — Rare Taxa (DEC)

Scientific classification
- Kingdom: Plantae
- Clade: Embryophytes
- Clade: Tracheophytes
- Clade: Spermatophytes
- Clade: Angiosperms
- Clade: Eudicots
- Clade: Rosids
- Order: Myrtales
- Family: Myrtaceae
- Genus: Eucalyptus
- Species: E. caesia

Binomial name
- Eucalyptus caesia Benth.
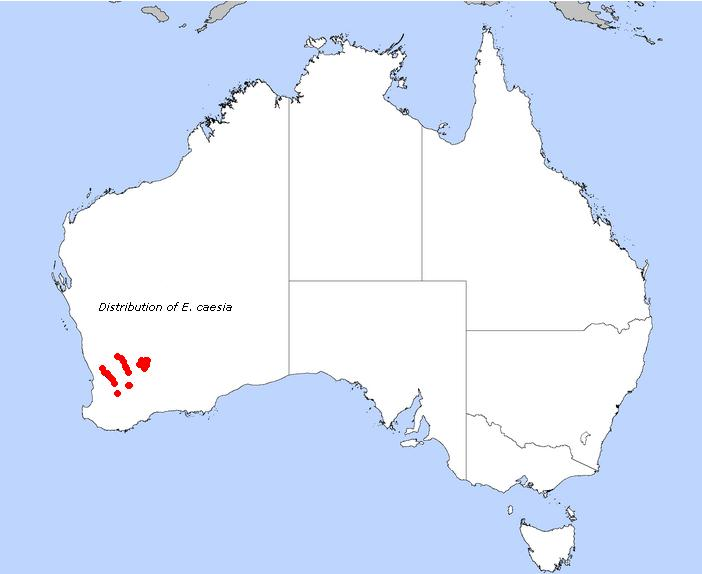
- E. caesia, field distribution

Synonyms
- Eucalyptus caesia ‘Silver Princess’; Eucalyptus caesia Benth. subsp. caesia; Eucalyptus caesia subsp. magna Brooker & Hopper

= Eucalyptus caesia =

Caesia

Species of eucalyptus

Eucalyptus caesia, commonly known as caesia or gungurru, is a species of mallee that is endemic to the south-west of Western Australia. It has smooth reddish brown bark at first, later shedding in curling flakes, lance-shaped, sometimes curved adult leaves, club-shaped flower buds covered with a waxy, bluish white bloom, pink stamens with yellow anthers and urn-shaped fruit.

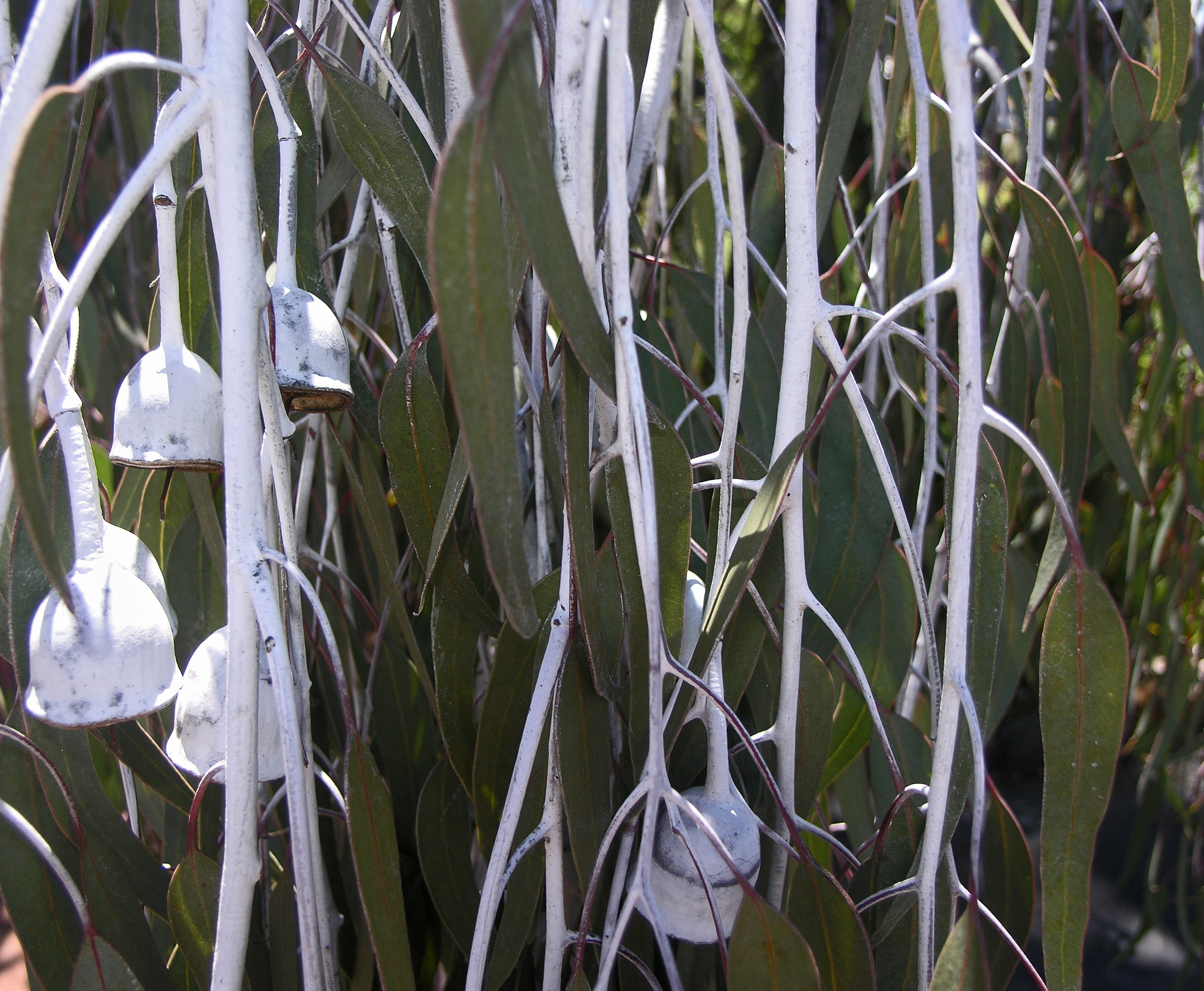
Fruit

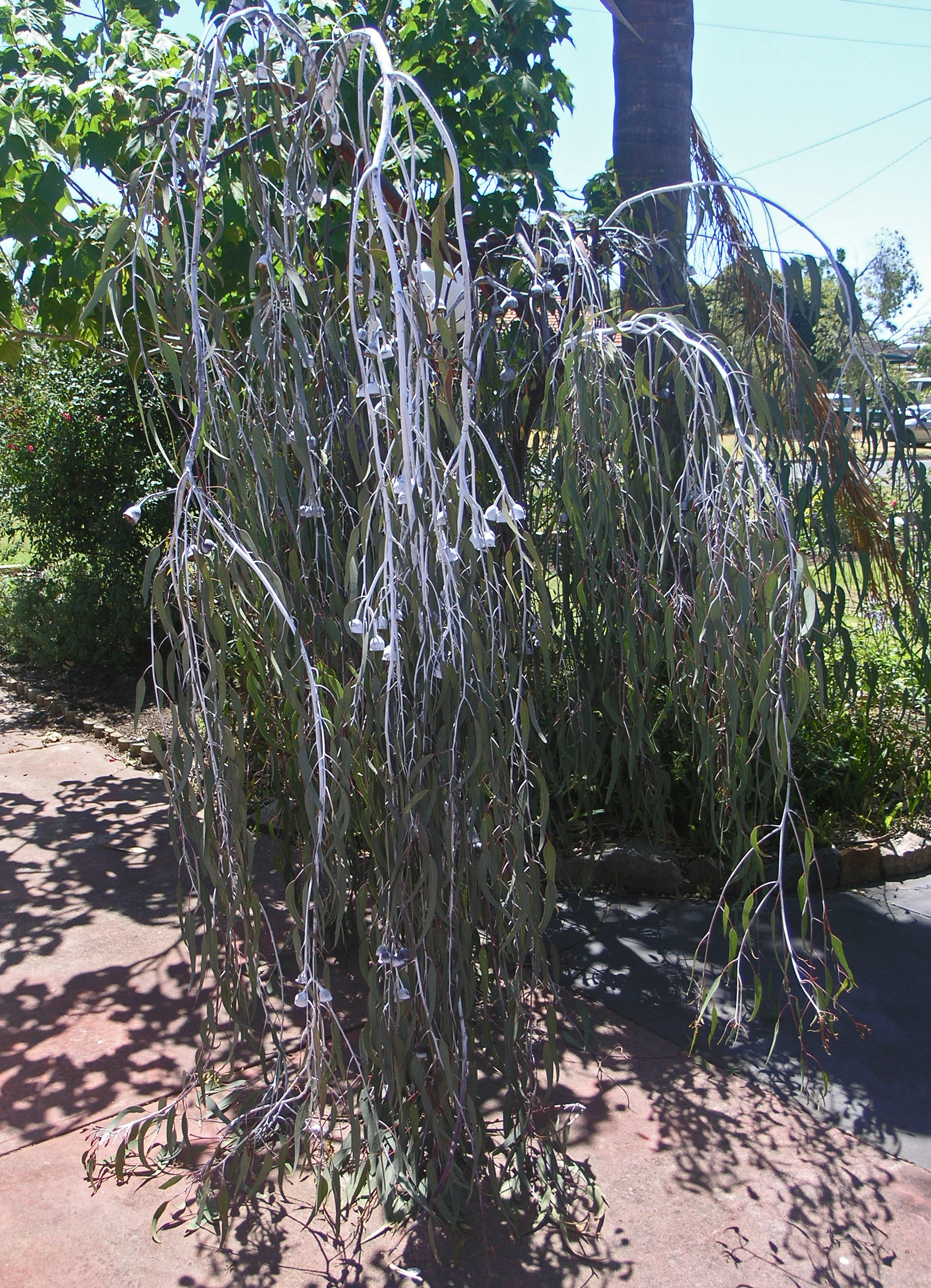
Habit

== Description ==
Eucalyptus caesia is a mallee that typically grows to a height of 2 to 14 metres (6.6 to 45.9 ft) and forms a lignotuber. The bark is smooth reddish brown at first and is shed in curling longitudinal flakes known as "minnirichi". Young branches are shiny red, covered with a waxy, bluish white bloom. Young plants and coppice regrowth have thick, glossy green, heart-shaped leaves 25–80 mm (0.98–3.1 in) long and 25–60 mm (1–2 in) wide that have a petiole. Adult leaves are lance-shaped to curved, mostly 80–110 mm (3.1–4.3 in) long and 15–25 mm (0.6–1 in) wide on a petiole 10–35 mm (0.39–1.4 in) long. The flower buds are arranged in leaf axils in groups of three on an unbranched peduncle 15–35 mm (0.59–1.4 in) long, the individual flowers on pedicels 15–22 mm (0.59–0.87 in) long. Mature flower buds are oval or pear-shaped, covered with a whitish waxy bloom, 17–30 mm (0.67–1.2 in) long and 10–13 mm (0.39–0.51 in) wide with a conical operculum. Flowering mainly occurs between May and September and the flowers have pink stamens with yellow anthers on the tip. The fruit is a woody bell-shaped or urn-shaped capsule 15–25 mm (0.59–0.98 in) long and 18–23 mm (0.71–0.91 in) wide on a peduncle 13–33 mm (0.51–1.3 in) long.

== Taxonomy and naming ==
Eucalyptus caesia was first formally described in 1867 by George Bentham from a collection made by James Drummond in 1847 and the description was published in Flora Australiensis.

In 1982, Ian Brooker and Stephen Hopper described two subspecies, but the Australian Plant Census accepts these as synonyms:

- Eucalyptus caesia subsp. caesia grows to a height of 6 to 9 metres (20 to 30 ft) with smaller leaves, buds and fruit than the other subspecies;
- Eucalyptus caesia subsp. magna grows to a height of 15 metres (49 ft) with pendulous branches and larger leaves, buds and fruit.

The specific epithet (caesia) is a Latin word meaning "bluish grey" referring to the waxy cover of the small branches, flower buds and fruit.

== Distribution and habitat ==
Caesia grows in crevices at the base of granite outcrops in scattered inland areas of the south-west, including in the Avon Wheatbelt and Mallee biogeographic regions. The species is known to be drought tolerant.

== Ecology ==
Despite persisting as very small populations, this species does not seem to exhibit effects of inbreeding depression. Associated species include Eucalyptus crucis, Eucalyptus loxophleba, Allocasuarina huegeliana and Acacia lasiocalyx.

== Use in horticulture ==
A form known as 'Silver Princess' is described as a "graceful weeping tree" that has an irregular and weeping form.

Propagation is from seed, which germinates readily.

== See also ==
- List of Eucalyptus species
