= British Cactus & Succulent Society =

Registered charity in the UK which promotes gardening and horticulture

- Abbreviation: BCSS
- Formation: 16 April 1983; 43 years ago
- Type: Registered charity
- Purpose: Promote cacti and succulents
- Region served: United Kingdom & World
- Members: around 3,000 (2021)
- President: Graham Charles
- Website: www.society.bcss.org.uk

The British Cactus & Succulent Society (BCSS) was founded in 1983 by the coalition of The National Cactus and Succulent Society (founded 23 August 1945 as The Yorkshire Cactus Society) and The Cactus and Succulent Society of Great Britain (officially founded 8 March 1932, affiliated to the Royal Horticultural Society). There are over 80 local branches around the UK that organise local activities including shows, talks and markets. The national Society also organises talks, shows and international conventions. The current patrons are Anne Swithinbank and Tom Hart Dyke.

== Objectives ==
The principal objectives of the BCSS are to promote the study, conservation, propagation and cultivation of cacti and other succulent plants.

The policy the society is to disqualifying plants that had been collected from the wild from the society's competitions. Disagreement with this by some of the society's members led to the resignation of the society's president in 2024.

== Publications ==
=== Journals ===
CactusWorld is published four times a year and is intended for those with a general interest in cacti and succulents.

Bradleya has been published once a year since 1983 and only includes articles of a rigorously academic standard, though intended to be accessible and easily-understood by the general reader.

=== Books ===
The BCSS also publishes a range of books from general cultivation guides to monographs on specific genera of cacti and succulents. They also work with partners such as Kew Publishing to produce larger books for a wider audience.
