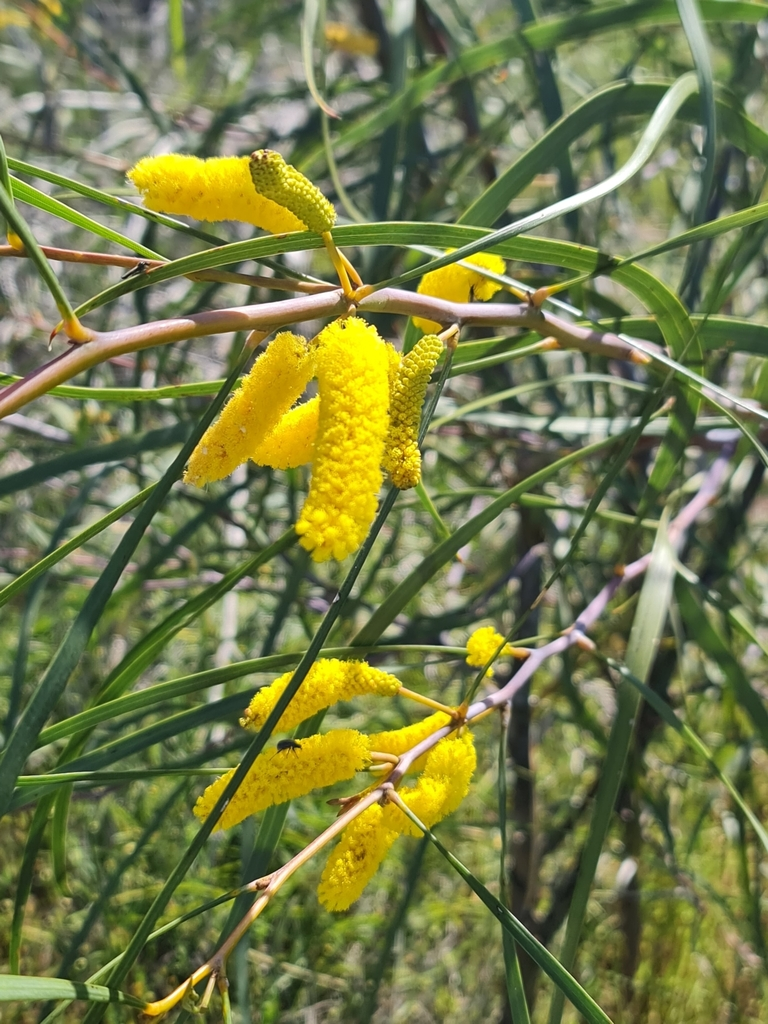

Scientific classification
- Kingdom: Plantae
- Clade: Tracheophytes
- Clade: Angiosperms
- Clade: Eudicots
- Clade: Rosids
- Order: Fabales
- Family: Fabaceae
- Subfamily: Caesalpinioideae
- Clade: Mimosoid clade
- Genus: Acacia
- Species: A. lasiocalyx

Binomial name
- Acacia lasiocalyx C.R.P.Andrews
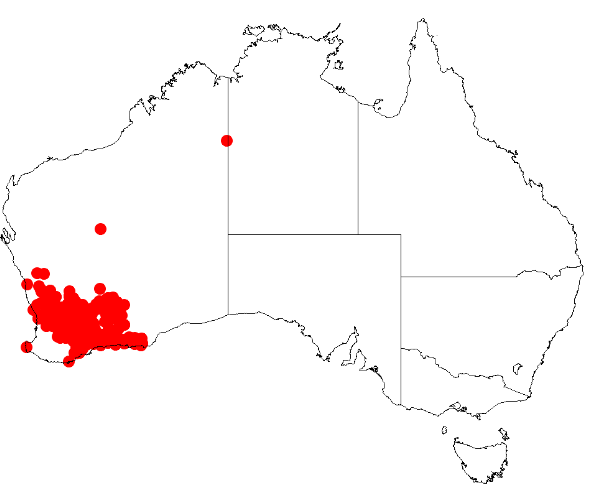
- Occurrence data from AVH

Synonyms
- Racosperma lasiocalyx (C.R.P.Andrews) Pedley; Acacia acuminata auct. non Benth.: Bentham, G. (5 October 1864) p.p.; Acacia doratoxylon auct. non A.Cunn.: Meisner, C.D.F. in Lehmann, J.G.C. (ed.) (1844) p.p.; Acacia signata auct. non F.Muell.: Diels, F.L.E. & Pritzel, E.G. (6 December 1904)

= Acacia lasiocalyx =

Shaggy wattle

Species of legume

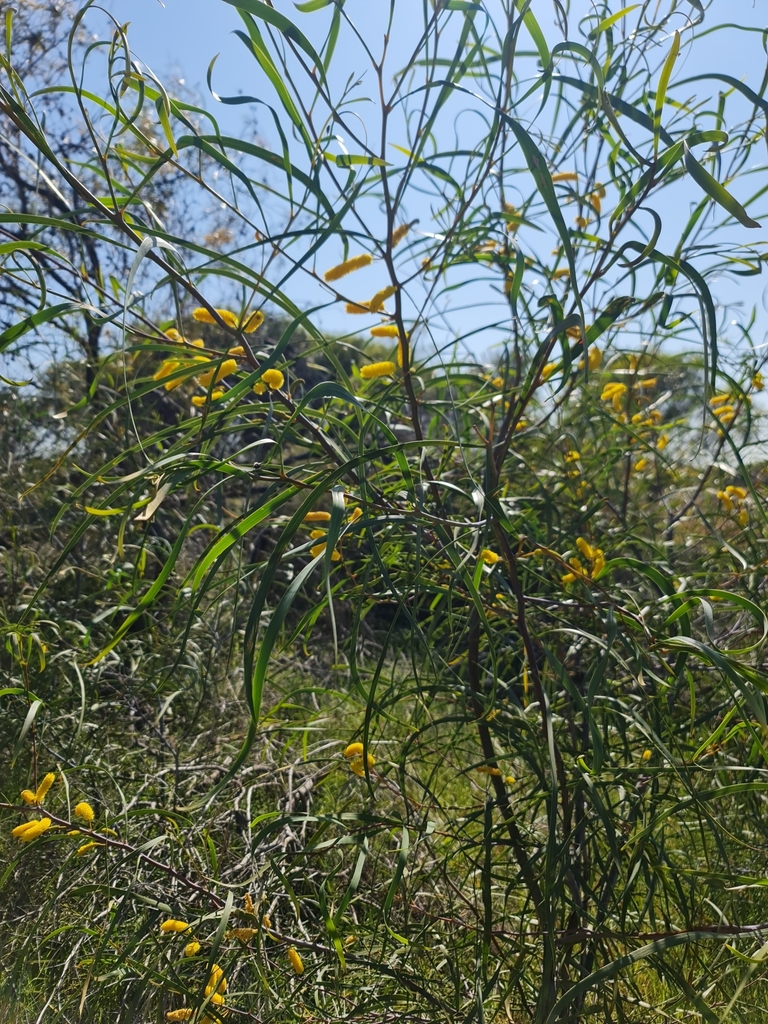
Habit near Wongan Hills

Acacia lasiocalyx, commonly known as silver wattle and known by the Noongar peoples as wilyurwur, is a species of flowering plant in the family Fabaceae and is endemic to the south-west of Western Australia. It is an open, often weeping, glabrous shrub, or sometimes a tree, with pendent, linear, leathery, more or less straight to curved phyllodes, spikes of densely arranged golden yellow flowers, and linear pods raised over the seeds and constricted between them.

== Description ==
Acacia lasiocalyx is an open, often weeping, glabrous shrub that typically grows to a height of 1.5–7 m (5–23 ft), sometimes a tree up to 12 m (39 ft), its branchlets covered with a white, powdery bloom. Its phyllodes are leathery, linear, straight to curved, 130–300 mm (5.1–11.8 in) long, 2–10 mm (0.079–0.394 in) wide, the tips obviously curved, and finely striated with the midrib being the most prominent. The flowers are borne in spikes on paired peduncles 8–17 mm (0.31–0.67 in) long and covered with a powdery bloom, the spikes 20–40 mm (0.79–1.57 in) long and 6–7 mm (0.24–0.28 in) wide, with densely arranged golden yellow flowers. Flowering occurs from July to October, and the pods are linear, leathery, up to 160 mm (6.3 in) long, 4.5–5.5 mm (0.18–0.22 in) wide, straight to slightly curved and raised over the seeds and constricted between them. The seeds are elliptic, 5–6 mm (0.20–0.24 in) long and glossy dark brown.

== Taxonomy ==
Acacia lasiocalyx was first formally described in 1904 by Cecil Rollo Payton Andrews in the Journal of the Western Australian Natural History Society from specimens he found "on sand plains near the Gairdner and Hammersley Rivers in October, 1903". The specific epithet (lasiocalyx) means 'shaggy or woolly sepals'.

== Distribution and habitat ==
This species of wattle grows in gravelly, loamy or clayey sand and loam, often on the slopes of granitic hills and granite outcrop, but also on sandplains and in mallee woodland and heath and is widespread on the southwest of Western Australia from near Eneabba and Kalgoorlie and south to Bremer Bay and Mount Heywood north-east of Esperance, in the Avon Wheatbelt, Coolgardie, Esperance Plains, Geraldton Sandplains, Jarrah Forest, Mallee, Murchison and Swan Coastal Plain bioregions.

== Ecology ==
The tree is fibrous and copes well in arid conditions. It germinates prolifically after fire forming dense thickets of trees which are about 4 metres (13.1 ft) in height. These thickets thin out over the following decades, and trees may attain a height of 25 metres.

== See also ==
- List of Acacia species
