= Noterophila (disambiguation) =

Noterophila may refer to:

- Noterophila, a genus of flowering plants in family Melastomataceae
- Bignonia noterophila, a flowering plant species
- Noterophila (fly), a synonym for Camilla, a fly genus
