= Tristemma =

Tristemma may refer to:

- Tristemma (plant), a genus of flowering plants in the family Melastomataceae
- Tristemma, a genus of mollusks in the family Holospiridae; synonym of Holospira
