= Perilimnastes =

Scientific classification
- Kingdom: Plantae
- Clade: Tracheophytes
- Clade: Angiosperms
- Clade: Eudicots
- Clade: Rosids
- Order: Myrtales
- Family: Melastomataceae
- Subfamily: Melastomatoideae
- Tribe: Sonerileae
- Genus: Perilimnastes; Ridl.

Genus of flowering plants

Perilimnastes is a genus of flowering plants in the family Melastomataceae. It includes 21 species native to southern China, Peninsular Malaysia, Vietnam and Borneo.

The genus was first described by Henry Nicholas Ridley based on P. fruticosa (Ridl.) Ridl. It was later subsumed into genus Phyllagathis Blume. Molecular phylogenetic studies found Phyllagathis to be polyphyletic, and in 2024 Ying Liu et al. revived Perilimnastes as a distinct genus.

== Species ==
21 species are accepted.

- Perilimnastes aura Souvann. & Lamxay
- Perilimnastes banaensis J.H.Dai, T.V.Do & Ying Liu
- Perilimnastes brookei (M.P.Nayar) Ying Liu
- Perilimnastes deltoidea (C.Chen) Ying Liu
- Perilimnastes dispar (Cogn.) Ying Liu
- Perilimnastes elegans (Hai L.Chen, Yan Liu & Ying Liu) Ying Liu
- Perilimnastes elliptica (Stapf) Ying Liu
- Perilimnastes fruticosa (Ridl.) Ridl.
- Perilimnastes guillauminii (H.L.Li) Ying Liu
- Perilimnastes melastomatoides (Merr. & Chun) Ying Liu
- Perilimnastes multisepala J.H.Dai, T.V.Do & Ying Liu
- Perilimnastes nana C.Y.Zou & Ying Liu
- Perilimnastes ovalifolia (H.L.Li) Ying Liu
- Perilimnastes rupicola M.P.Nayar
- Perilimnastes sessilifolia (C.Hansen) Ying Liu
- Perilimnastes setipetiola J.H.Dai, T.V.Do & Ying Liu
- Perilimnastes setotheca (H.L.Li) Ying LiuLiu
- Perilimnastes dongchauensis H.C.Nguyen, V.N.Duong, T.D.Bui, T.H.Tran
- Perilimnastes stenophylla (Merr. & Chun) Ying Liu
- Perilimnastes suberalata (C.Hansen) Ying Liu
- Perilimnastes ternata (C.Chen) Ying Liu
- Perilimnastes uniflora J.H.Dai, T.V.Do & Ying Liu
