= Tashiroea =

Scientific classification
- Kingdom: Plantae
- Clade: Tracheophytes
- Clade: Angiosperms
- Clade: Eudicots
- Clade: Rosids
- Order: Myrtales
- Family: Melastomataceae
- Genus: Tashiroea; Matsum. ex T.Itô & Matsum.

Genus of flowering plants

Tashiroea is a genus of plants in the family Melastomataceae. Species in this group resemble morphologically those in genus Bredia, but differ in indumentum of mature leaf (Glabrous, with yellowish uniseriate trichomes vs. Sparsely to densely puberulous or strigose, appressed or spreading uniseriate trichomes with glandular head or not), leaf surface sculpture (Furrowed vs. Not furrowed) and capsule (Ovary crown usually evanescent, capsule uncrowned with rounded or 4-humped top vs. Ovary crown persistent and enlarged, enclosing an inverted frustum-shaped depression at capsule top). This genus includes 11 species, eight in southeastern mainland China, one in Taiwan, and two in the Ryukyus. Most species in this group prefer open or dense forests, slopes, stream banks, alt. 50–2300 m.

This genus was first established to accommodate T. yaeyamensis and T. okinawensis. Li (1944) synonymized Tashiroea, accommodating its species in Bredia. While based on a recent phylogenetic study, Tashiroea has been resurrected from Bredia.

== Species ==
- Tashiroea amoena (Diels) R.C.Zhou & Ying Liu
- Tashiroea biglandularis (C. Chen) R.C.Zhou & Ying Liu
- Tashiroea laisherana (C.L. Yeh & C.R. Yeh) R.C.Zhou & Ying Liu
- Tashiroea nudipes (C. Chen) R.C.Zhou & Ying Liu
- Tashiroea okinawensis Matsum.
- Tashiroea oligotricha (Merr.) R.C.Zhou & Ying Liu
- Tashiroea quadrangularis (Cogn.) R.C.Zhou & Ying Liu
- Tashiroea sessilifolia (H.L. Li) R.C.Zhou & Ying Liu
- Tashiroea sinensis Diels
- Tashiroea yaeyamensis Matsum.
- Tashiroea villosa X.X.Su
