= Anerincleistus =

Scientific classification
- Kingdom: Plantae
- Clade: Tracheophytes
- Clade: Angiosperms
- Clade: Eudicots
- Clade: Rosids
- Order: Myrtales
- Family: Melastomataceae
- Genus: Anerincleistus; Korth.

Genus of flowering plants

Anerincleistus is a genus of flowering plants belonging to the family Melastomataceae.

Its native range is Tropical Asia.

Species:

- Anerincleistus acuminatissimus (Ridl.) M.P.Nayar
- Anerincleistus angustifolius (Stapf) J.F.Maxwell
- Anerincleistus barbatus M.P.Nayar
- Anerincleistus bracteatus C.Hansen
- Anerincleistus bullatus J.F.Maxwell
- Anerincleistus cornutus J.F.Maxwell
- Anerincleistus curtisii Stapf
- Anerincleistus cyathocalyx J.F.Maxwell
- Anerincleistus dispar Cogn. ex Boerl.
- Anerincleistus echinatus J.F.Maxwell
- Anerincleistus fasciculatus M.P.Nayar
- Anerincleistus floribundus King
- Anerincleistus fruticosus Ridl.
- Anerincleistus grandiflorus Ridl.
- Anerincleistus griffithii Hook.f. ex Triana
- Anerincleistus hirsutus Korth.
- Anerincleistus hispidissimus (Ridl.) M.P.Nayar
- Anerincleistus macranthus King
- Anerincleistus macrophyllus Bakh.f.
- Anerincleistus monticola W.W.Sm.
- Anerincleistus pauciflorus Ridl.
- Anerincleistus pedunculatus (Craib) M.P.Nayar
- Anerincleistus philippinensis Merr.
- Anerincleistus phyllagathoides (Stapf) J.F.Maxwell
- Anerincleistus pittonii
- Anerincleistus pulchra Ridl.
- Anerincleistus purpureus (Stapf) J.F.Maxwell
- Anerincleistus quintuplinervis (Cogn.) J.F.Maxwell
- Anerincleistus rupicola (Nayar) J.F.Maxwell
- Anerincleistus sertuliferum (Cogn.) J.F.Maxwell
- Anerincleistus setosus (Nayar) J.F.Maxwell
- Anerincleistus setulosus O.Schwartz
- Anerincleistus stipularis (Ridl.) J.F.Maxwell
