= Styrophyton =

Scientific classification
- Kingdom: Plantae
- Clade: Tracheophytes
- Clade: Angiosperms
- Clade: Eudicots
- Clade: Rosids
- Order: Myrtales
- Family: Melastomataceae
- Genus: Styrophyton; S.Y.Hu
- Species: S. caudatum

Binomial name
- Styrophyton caudatum (Diels) S.Y.Hu

Genus of plants

Styrophyton is a monotypic genus of flowering plants belonging to the family Melastomataceae. The only species is Styrophyton caudatum.

Its native range is Southern China.
