= Tigridiopalma =

Scientific classification
- Kingdom: Plantae
- Clade: Tracheophytes
- Clade: Angiosperms
- Clade: Eudicots
- Clade: Rosids
- Order: Myrtales
- Family: Melastomataceae
- Genus: Tigridiopalma; C.Chen

Genus of flowering plants

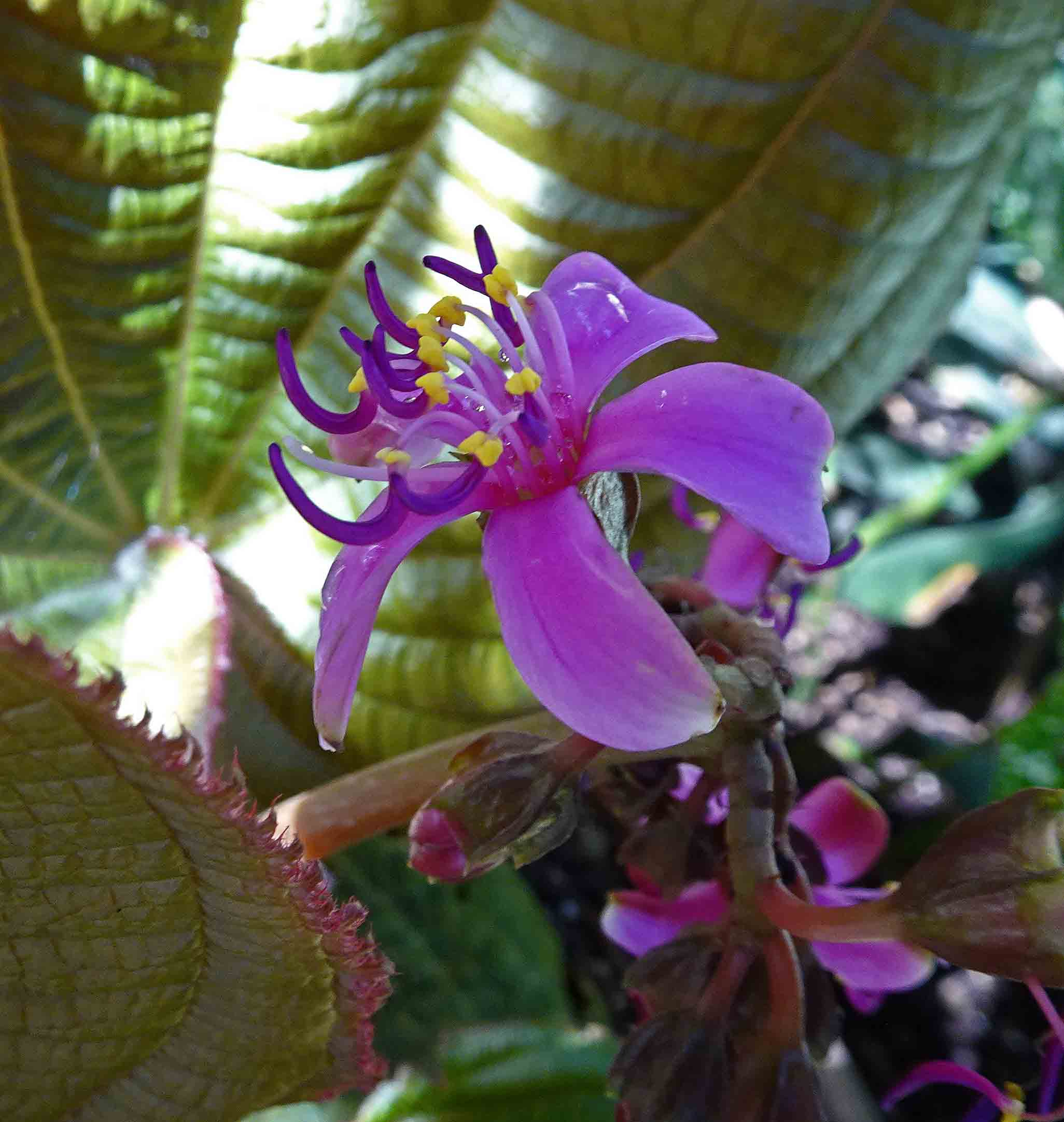
Tigridiopalma magnifica in bloom

Tigridiopalma is a genus of flowering plants belonging to the family Melastomataceae.

Its native range is Southeastern China.

Species:

- Tigridiopalma magnifica C.Chen
