= Poilannammia =

Scientific classification
- Kingdom: Plantae
- Clade: Tracheophytes
- Clade: Angiosperms
- Clade: Eudicots
- Clade: Rosids
- Order: Myrtales
- Family: Melastomataceae
- Genus: Poilannammia; C.Hansen

Species of flowering plant

Poilannammia is a genus of flowering plants belonging to the family Melastomataceae.

It is native to Vietnam.

The genus name of Poilannammia is in honour of Eugène Poilane (1888–1964), a French plant collector at the botanical institute in present-day Ho Chi Minh City, Vietnam. He also worked in the forest service. It was first described and published in Bull. Mus. Natl. Hist. Nat., B, Adansonia, séries 4, Vol.9 on page 263 in 1988.

== Known species ==
According to Kew:

- Poilannammia allomorphioidea C.Hansen
- Poilannammia costata C.Hansen
- Poilannammia incisa C.Hansen
- Poilannammia trimera C.Hansen
