= Barthea =

Scientific classification
- Kingdom: Plantae
- Clade: Tracheophytes
- Clade: Angiosperms
- Clade: Eudicots
- Clade: Rosids
- Order: Myrtales
- Family: Melastomataceae
- Genus: Barthea; Hook.f.

Genus of flowering plants

Barthea is a genus of flowering plants belonging to the family Melastomataceae.

Its native range is Vietnam, Southeastern China and Taiwan.

Species:

- Barthea barthei
