= Bamlera =

Scientific classification
- Kingdom: Plantae
- Clade: Tracheophytes
- Clade: Angiosperms
- Clade: Eudicots
- Clade: Rosids
- Order: Myrtales
- Family: Melastomataceae
- Genus: Bamlera; K.Schum. & Lauterb. (1900)

Species
- Bamlera insignis K.Schum. & Lauterb.; Bamlera tenuifolia Mansf.

Genus of flowering plants

Bamlera is a genus of flowering plants in the family Melastomataceae. It includes two species endemic to New Guinea.
