= Nothodissotis =

Scientific classification
- Kingdom: Plantae
- Clade: Tracheophytes
- Clade: Angiosperms
- Clade: Eudicots
- Clade: Rosids
- Order: Myrtales
- Family: Melastomataceae
- Genus: Nothodissotis; Ver.-Lib. & G.Kadereit

Genus of plants

Nothodissotis is a genus of flowering plants belonging to the family Melastomataceae.

Its native range is Western Central Tropical Africa.

Species:

- Nothodissotis alenensis Ver.-Lib. & O.Lachenaud
- Nothodissotis barteri (Hook.f.) Ver.-Lib. & G.Kadereit
