= Feliciadamia =

Scientific classification
- Kingdom: Plantae
- Clade: Tracheophytes
- Clade: Angiosperms
- Clade: Eudicots
- Clade: Rosids
- Order: Myrtales
- Family: Melastomataceae
- Genus: Feliciadamia; Bullock

Synonyms
- Adamea Jacq.-Fél.; Adamia Jacq.-Fél.

Genus of flowering plants

Feliciadamia is a monotypic genus of flowering plants belonging to the family Melastomataceae, it contains one species, Feliciadamia stenocarpa (Jacq.-Fél.) Bullock.

Its native range is Guinea.

The genus of Feliciadamia is a portmanteaux word, honouring both Henri Jacques-Félix (1907–2008), French naturalist at the National Museum of Natural History, and also Jaques-George Adam (1909–1980), French botanist and plant collector in France and Africa. The specific epithet of stenocarpa is derived from the ancient Greek stenos (στενός), "narrow" and karpos (καρπός), "fruit". It was first described and published in Kew Bull. Vol.15 on page 393 in 1962.
