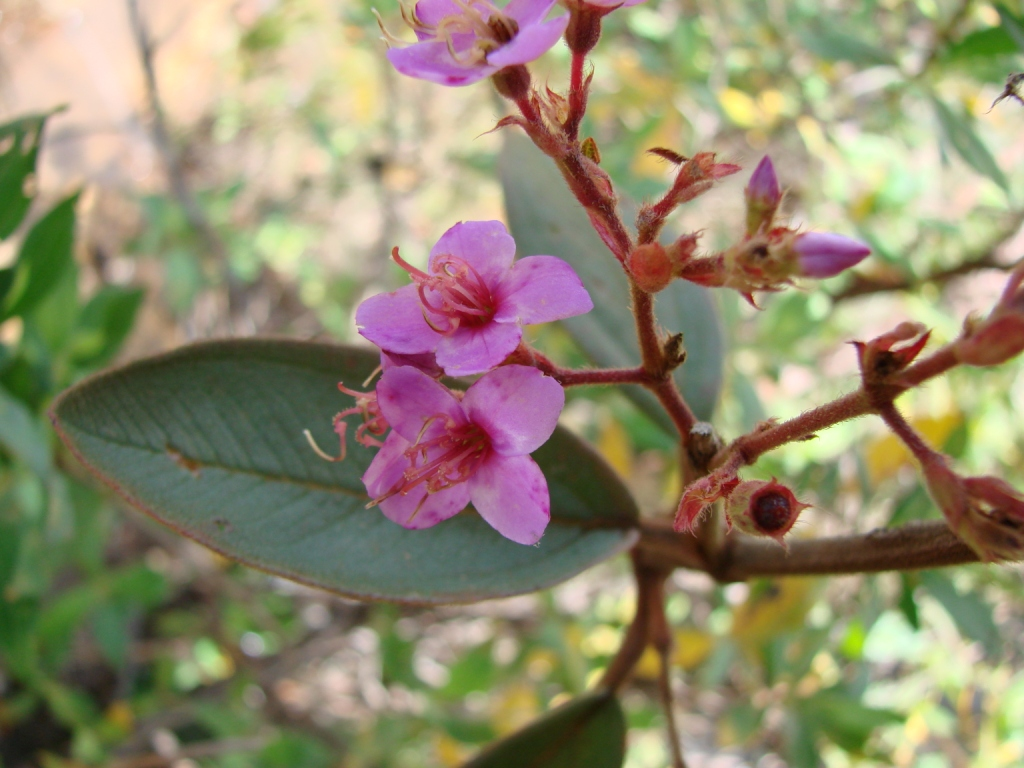
- Macairea radula

Scientific classification
- Kingdom: Plantae
- Clade: Tracheophytes
- Clade: Angiosperms
- Clade: Eudicots
- Clade: Rosids
- Order: Myrtales
- Family: Melastomataceae
- Genus: Macairea; DC.

Species
- See text

Synonyms
- Siphantheropsis Brade

= Macairea =

Genus of flowering plants

Macairea are a genus of flowering plants in the family Melastomataceae, native to South America. They are shrubs with terete branches, and have four petals per flower.

== Species ==
Currently accepted species include:

- Macairea axilliflora Wurdack
- Macairea cardonae Wurdack
- Macairea chimantensis Wurdack
- Macairea cuieirasii S.S.Renner
- Macairea duidae Gleason
- Macairea lanata Gleason
- Macairea lasiophylla (Benth.) Wurdack
- Macairea linearis Gleason
- Macairea maroana Wurdack
- Macairea multinervia Benth.
- Macairea neblinae Wurdack
- Macairea pachyphylla Benth.
- Macairea parvifolia Benth.
- Macairea philipsonii S.S.Renner
- Macairea radula DC.
- Macairea rigida Benth.
- Macairea rotundifolia Cogn. & Hoehne
- Macairea rufescens DC.
- Macairea spruceana O.Berg ex Triana
- Macairea stylosa Triana
- Macairea sulcata Triana
- Macairea theresiae Cogn.
- Macairea thyrsiflora DC.
