= Siphanthera =

Scientific classification
- Kingdom: Plantae
- Clade: Tracheophytes
- Clade: Angiosperms
- Clade: Eudicots
- Clade: Rosids
- Order: Myrtales
- Family: Melastomataceae
- Genus: Siphanthera; Pohl

Genus of plants

Siphanthera is a genus of flowering plants belonging to the family Melastomataceae.

Its native range is Southern Tropical America.

Species:

- Siphanthera arenaria Cogn.
- Siphanthera cordata Pohl
- Siphanthera cordifolia (Benth.) Gleason
- Siphanthera cowanii Wurdack
- Siphanthera dawsonii Wurdack
- Siphanthera duidae (Gleason) Wurdack
- Siphanthera fasciculata (Gleason) Almeda & O.R.Rob.
- Siphanthera foliosa (Naudin) Wurdack
- Siphanthera gracillima (Naudin) Wurdack
- Siphanthera hostmannii Cogn.
- Siphanthera miqueliana Cogn.
- Siphanthera paludosa Cogn.
- Siphanthera ramosissima Cogn. ex Hoehne
- Siphanthera robusta Cogn.
- Siphanthera subtilis Pohl
- Siphanthera todziae Almeda & O.R.Rob.
- Siphanthera vaupesana Wurdack
- Siphanthera villosa Cogn.
- Siphanthera wurdackii Almeda & O.R.Rob.
