= Astrocalyx =

Scientific classification
- Kingdom: Plantae
- Clade: Tracheophytes
- Clade: Angiosperms
- Clade: Eudicots
- Clade: Rosids
- Order: Myrtales
- Family: Melastomataceae
- Genus: Astrocalyx; Merr.

Genus of flowering plants

Astrocalyx is a genus of flowering plants belonging to the family Melastomataceae.

Its native range is Philippines.

Species:

- Astrocalyx calycina (S.Vidal) Merr.
