= Dicellandra =

Scientific classification
- Kingdom: Plantae
- Clade: Tracheophytes
- Clade: Angiosperms
- Clade: Eudicots
- Clade: Rosids
- Order: Myrtales
- Family: Melastomataceae
- Genus: Dicellandra; Hook.f.

Genus of plants

Dicellandra is a genus of flowering plants belonging to the family Melastomataceae.

Its native range is Western Tropical Africa to Uganda and Angola.

Species:

- Dicellandra barteri Hook.f.
- Dicellandra descoingsii Jacq.-Fél.
- Dicellandra glanduligera (Pellegr.) Jacq.-Fél.
