= Dionycha (plant) =

Scientific classification
- Kingdom: Plantae
- Clade: Tracheophytes
- Clade: Angiosperms
- Clade: Eudicots
- Clade: Rosids
- Order: Myrtales
- Family: Melastomataceae
- Genus: Dionycha; Naudin (1851)

Species
- Dionycha boinensis H.Perrier; Dionycha bojerii Naudin; Dionycha triangularis Jum. & H.Perrier

Synonyms
- Dionychia Benth. & Hook.f. (1867), orth. var.

Genus of plants

Dionycha is a genus of flowering plants in the family Melastomataceae. It includes three species endemic to Madagascar.

- Dionycha boinensis H.Perrier
- Dionycha bojerii Naudin
- Dionycha triangularis Jum. & H.Perrier
