= Eriocnema =

Scientific classification
- Kingdom: Plantae
- Clade: Tracheophytes
- Clade: Angiosperms
- Clade: Eudicots
- Clade: Rosids
- Order: Myrtales
- Family: Melastomataceae
- Genus: Eriocnema; Naudin

Genus of plants

Eriocnema is a genus of flowering plants belonging to the family Melastomataceae.

Its native range is Southeastern Brazil.

Species:

- Eriocnema acaulis Triana
- Eriocnema fulva Naudin
