= Macrocentrum =

Scientific classification
- Kingdom: Plantae
- Clade: Tracheophytes
- Clade: Angiosperms
- Clade: Eudicots
- Clade: Rosids
- Order: Myrtales
- Family: Melastomataceae
- Genus: Macrocentrum; Hook.f.

Genus of flowering plants

Macrocentrum is a genus of flowering plants belonging to the family Melastomataceae.

Its native range is Southern Tropical America.

== Species ==
Species:

- Macrocentrum andinum Michelang. & R.Goldenb.
- Macrocentrum anfractum Wurdack
- Macrocentrum angustifolium Gleason
- Macrocentrum anychioides Gleason
- Macrocentrum brevipedicellatum Wurdack
- Macrocentrum chimantense Wurdack
- Macrocentrum cristatum Triana
- Macrocentrum droseroides Triana
- Macrocentrum fasciculatum Hook.f.
- Macrocentrum fruticosum Gleason
- Macrocentrum gesneriaceum Sandwith
- Macrocentrum gracile Wurdack
- Macrocentrum huberi Wurdack
- Macrocentrum latifolium Wurdack
- Macrocentrum longidens (Gleason) Wurdack
- Macrocentrum maguirei Wurdack
- Macrocentrum minus Gleason
- Macrocentrum neblinae Wurdack
- Macrocentrum parvulum Gleason
- Macrocentrum repens (Gleason) Wurdack
- Macrocentrum rubescens Gleason
- Macrocentrum steyermarkii Wurdack
- Macrocentrum stipulaceum Wurdack
- Macrocentrum vestitum Sandwith
- Macrocentrum yaracuyense Wurdack
