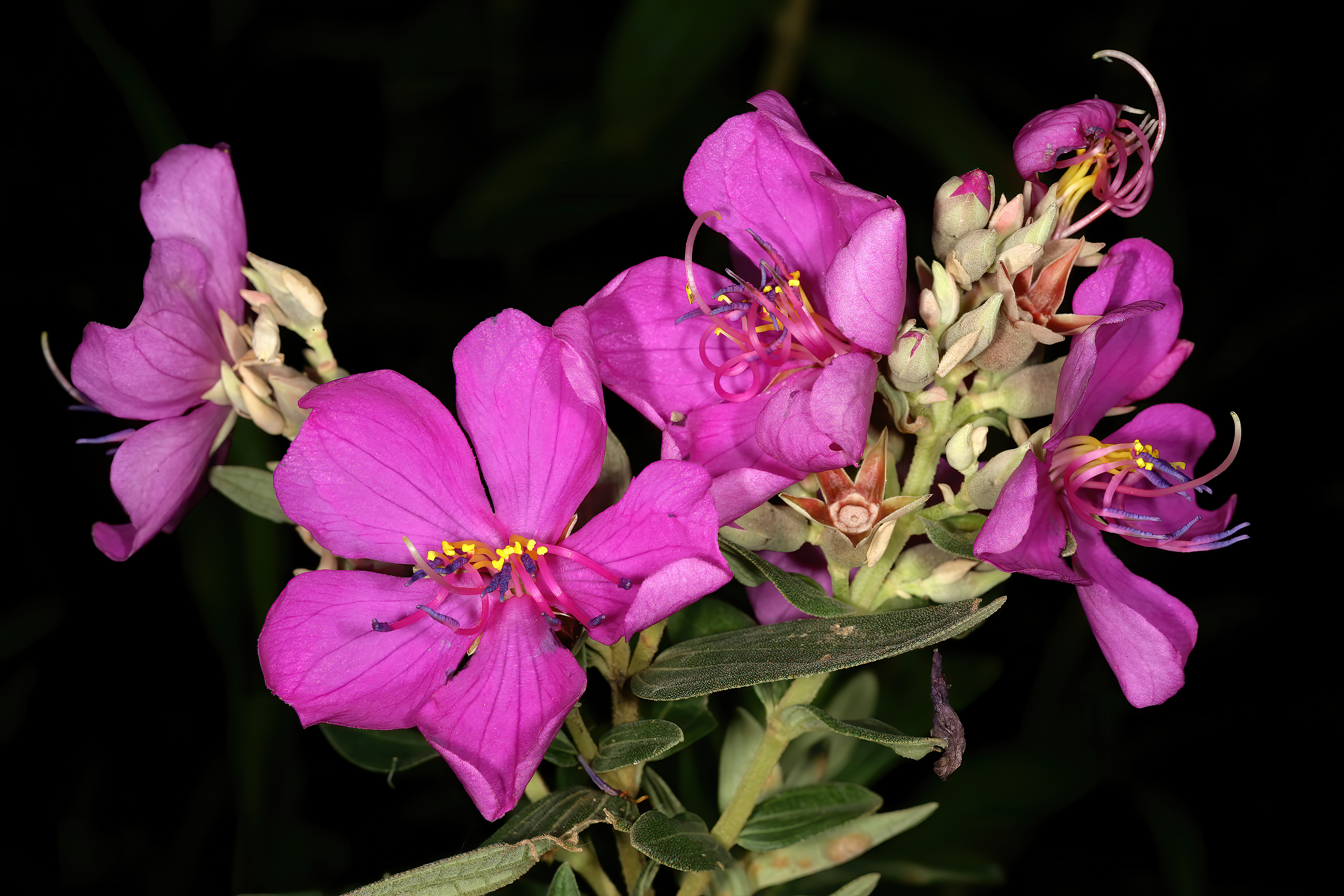
- Argyrella canescens

Scientific classification
- Kingdom: Plantae
- Clade: Tracheophytes
- Clade: Angiosperms
- Clade: Eudicots
- Clade: Rosids
- Order: Myrtales
- Family: Melastomataceae
- Genus: Argyrella; Naudin

= Argyrella =

Genus of flowering plants

Argyrella is a genus of flowering plants belonging to the family Melastomataceae. Its native range is Africa.

Plants of the World Online accepts the following species:

- Argyrella amplexicaulis (Jacq.-Fél.) Ver.-Lib. & G.Kadereit
- Argyrella angolensis (Cogn.) Ver.-Lib. & G.Kadereit
- Argyrella bambutorum (Gilg & Ledermann ex Engl.) Ver.-Lib. & G.Kadereit
- Argyrella canescens (Graham) Harv.
- Argyrella linearis (Jacq.-Fél.) Ver.-Lib. & G.Kadereit
- Argyrella phaeotricha (Hochst.) Naudin
- Argyrella richardsiae Ver.-Lib. & G.Kadereit
- Argyrella sessilis (Hutch. ex Brenan & Keay) Ver.-Lib. & G.Kadereit
