= Neblinanthera =

Scientific classification
- Kingdom: Plantae
- Clade: Tracheophytes
- Clade: Angiosperms
- Clade: Eudicots
- Clade: Rosids
- Order: Myrtales
- Family: Melastomataceae
- Genus: Neblinanthera; Wurdack
- Species: N. cumbrensis

Binomial name
- Neblinanthera cumbrensis Wurdack

Genus of plants

Neblinanthera is a monotypic genus of flowering plants belonging to the family Melastomataceae. The only species is Neblinanthera cumbrensis.

Its native range is Venezuela to Northern Brazil.
