= Rostranthera =

Scientific classification
- Kingdom: Plantae
- Clade: Tracheophytes
- Clade: Angiosperms
- Clade: Eudicots
- Clade: Rosids
- Order: Myrtales
- Family: Melastomataceae
- Genus: Rostranthera; M.J.Rocha & P.J.F.Guim.
- Species: R. tetraptera

Binomial name
- Rostranthera tetraptera (Cogn.) M.J.Rocha & P.J.F.Guim.

Synonyms
- Acisanthera tetraptera (Cogn.) Gleason; Comolia tetraptera Cogn. Acisanthera egleri Brade & Markgr. Acisanthera glomerata Gleason

Genus of plants

Rostranthera is a monotypic genus of flowering plants belonging to the family Melastomataceae. The only species is Rostranthera tetraptera.

Its native range is Suriname to Northern Brazil.
