= Votomita =

Scientific classification
- Kingdom: Plantae
- Clade: Tracheophytes
- Clade: Angiosperms
- Clade: Eudicots
- Clade: Rosids
- Order: Myrtales
- Family: Melastomataceae
- Genus: Votomita; Aubl.

Genus of flowering plants

Votomita is a genus of flowering plants belonging to the family Melastomataceae.

Its native range is Cuba, Panama to Southern Tropical America.

Species:

- Votomita cupuliformis Morley & Almeda
- Votomita guianensis Aubl.
