= Ochthocharis =

Scientific classification
- Kingdom: Plantae
- Clade: Tracheophytes
- Clade: Angiosperms
- Clade: Eudicots
- Clade: Rosids
- Order: Myrtales
- Family: Melastomataceae
- Genus: Ochthocharis; Blume

Genus of plants

Ochthocharis is a genus of flowering plants belonging to the family Melastomataceae.

Its native range is Western Tropical Africa to Zambia, Indo-China to New Guinea.

Species:

- Ochthocharis bornensis Blume
- Ochthocharis bullata Markgr.
- Ochthocharis decumbens King
- Ochthocharis dicellandroides (Gilg) C.Hansen & Wickens
- Ochthocharis javanica Blume
- Ochthocharis megalophylla Mansf.
- Ochthocharis ovata Cogn.
- Ochthocharis paniculata Korth.
- Ochthocharis setosa (Hook.f.) C.Hansen & Wickens
