= Poikilogyne =

Scientific classification
- Kingdom: Plantae
- Clade: Tracheophytes
- Clade: Angiosperms
- Clade: Eudicots
- Clade: Rosids
- Order: Myrtales
- Family: Melastomataceae
- Genus: Poikilogyne; Baker f.

Genus of plants

Poikilogyne is a genus of flowering plants belonging to the family Melastomataceae.

Its native range is Borneo, New Guinea.

Species:

- Poikilogyne arfakensis Baker f.
- Poikilogyne bicolor J.F.Maxwell
- Poikilogyne biporosa Bakh.f.
- Poikilogyne callantha (Mansf.) Nayar
- Poikilogyne carinata J.F.Maxwell
- Poikilogyne cordifolia Mansf.
- Poikilogyne cornuta Cellin. & J.F.Maxwell
- Poikilogyne diastematica J.F.Maxwell
- Poikilogyne furfuracea Markgr.
- Poikilogyne grandiflora J.F.Maxwell
- Poikilogyne hirta Nayar
- Poikilogyne hooglandii Nayar
- Poikilogyne lakekamuensis Cellin.
- Poikilogyne macrophylla Mansf.
- Poikilogyne magnifica Markgr.
- Poikilogyne mucronato-serrulata Ohwi
- Poikilogyne multiflora J.F.Maxwell
- Poikilogyne neglecta Nayar
- Poikilogyne parviflora Mansf.
- Poikilogyne paucifolia Nayar
- Poikilogyne pentamera Baker f.
- Poikilogyne robusta Mansf.
- Poikilogyne roemeri Mansf.
- Poikilogyne rubro-suffiusa Ohwi
- Poikilogyne rugosa Nayar
- Poikilogyne setosa C.T.White & W.D.Francis
- Poikilogyne velutina J.F.Maxwell
- Poikilogyne villosa J.F.Maxwell
