= Plethiandra =

Scientific classification
- Kingdom: Plantae
- Clade: Tracheophytes
- Clade: Angiosperms
- Clade: Eudicots
- Clade: Rosids
- Order: Myrtales
- Family: Melastomataceae
- Genus: Plethiandra; Hook.f.

Genus of plants

Plethiandra is a genus of flowering plants belonging to the family Melastomataceae.

Its native range is Western Malesia.

Species:

- Plethiandra beccariana Merr.
- Plethiandra cuneata Stapf
- Plethiandra hookeri Stapf
- Plethiandra motleyi Hook.f.
- Plethiandra robusta (Cogn.) Nayar
- Plethiandra sessiliflora Merr.
- Plethiandra sessilis Stapf
- Plethiandra tomentosa G.Kadereit
