= Brasilianthus =

Scientific classification
- Kingdom: Plantae
- Clade: Tracheophytes
- Clade: Angiosperms
- Clade: Eudicots
- Clade: Rosids
- Order: Myrtales
- Family: Melastomataceae
- Genus: Brasilianthus; Almeda & Michelang.

Genus of flowering plants

Brasilianthus is a genus of flowering plants belonging to the family Melastomataceae.

Its native range is Northern Brazil.

Species:

- Brasilianthus carajensis Almeda & Michelang.
