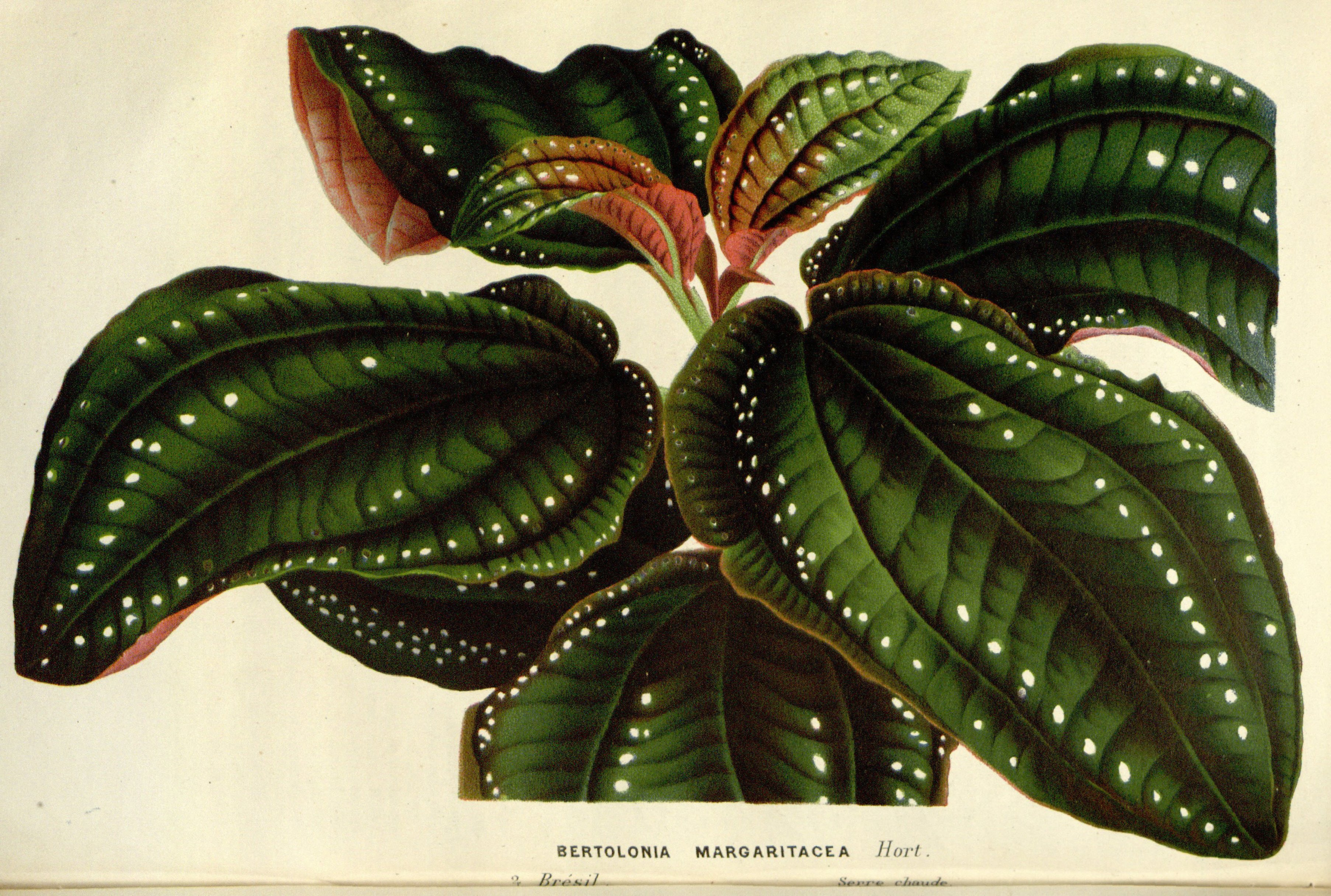
- Salpinga margaritacea

Scientific classification
- Kingdom: Plantae
- Clade: Tracheophytes
- Clade: Angiosperms
- Clade: Eudicots
- Clade: Rosids
- Order: Myrtales
- Family: Melastomataceae
- Genus: Salpinga; Mart. ex DC.

= Salpinga =

Genus of plants

Salpinga is a genus of flowering plants belonging to the family Melastomataceae.

Its native range is Southern Tropical America.

Species:

- Salpinga ciliata Pilg.
- Salpinga dimorpha (Gleason) Wurdack
- Salpinga glandulosa (Gleason) Wurdack
- Salpinga longifolia Triana
- Salpinga maguirei Gleason
- Salpinga maranonensis Wurdack
- Salpinga margaritacea (W.Bull ex Naudin) Triana
- Salpinga monostachya Pittier
- Salpinga paleacea Wurdack
- Salpinga peruviana (Cogn.) Wurdack
- Salpinga pusilla (Gleason) Wurdack
- Salpinga secunda Schrank & Mart. ex DC.
