= Comoliopsis =

Scientific classification
- Kingdom: Plantae
- Clade: Tracheophytes
- Clade: Angiosperms
- Clade: Eudicots
- Clade: Rosids
- Order: Myrtales
- Family: Melastomataceae
- Genus: Comoliopsis; Wurdack

Genus of flowering plants

Comoliopsis is a genus of flowering plants belonging to the family Melastomataceae.

Its native range is Venezuela and Northern Brazil.

Species:

- Comoliopsis coriacea (Gleason) M.J.Rocha & P.J.F.Guim.
- Comoliopsis montana (Gleason) M.J.Rocha & P.J.F.Guim.
- Comoliopsis neblinae Wurdack
