= Ochthephilus repentinus =

Scientific classification
- Kingdom: Plantae
- Clade: Tracheophytes
- Clade: Angiosperms
- Clade: Eudicots
- Clade: Rosids
- Order: Myrtales
- Family: Melastomataceae
- Genus: Ochthephilus; Wurdack (1972)
- Species: O. repentinus

Binomial name
- Ochthephilus repentinus Wurdack (1972)

Species of plant

Ochthephilus repentinus is a species of flowering plant in family Melastomataceae. It is endemic to Guyana. It is the sole species in genus Ochthephilus.
