= Creochiton =

Scientific classification
- Kingdom: Plantae
- Clade: Embryophytes
- Clade: Tracheophytes
- Clade: Spermatophytes
- Clade: Angiosperms
- Clade: Eudicots
- Clade: Rosids
- Order: Myrtales
- Family: Melastomataceae
- Genus: Creochiton; Blume

Genus of flowering plants

Creochiton is a genus of flowering plant belonging to the family Melastomataceae.

Its native range is Tropical Asia.

Species:

- Creochiton anomala (King) Veldkamp
- Creochiton bibracteata Blume
- Creochiton bracteata (Quisumb. & Merr.) Veldkamp
- Creochiton brevibracteata Mansf.
- Creochiton diptera Elmer
- Creochiton divitiflora Mansf.
- Creochiton furfuracea (M.P.Nayar) Veldkamp
- Creochiton kinabaluense Heine
- Creochiton ledermannii Mansf.
- Creochiton monticola (Ridl.) Veldkamp
- Creochiton novoguineensis (Baker f.) Veldkamp & M.P.Nayar
- Creochiton pudibunda Blume
- Creochiton rosea Merr.
- Creochiton schlechteri Mansf.
- Creochiton turbinatus (J.F.Maxwell) Karton.
