= Dinophora =

Scientific classification
- Kingdom: Plantae
- Clade: Tracheophytes
- Clade: Angiosperms
- Clade: Eudicots
- Clade: Rosids
- Order: Myrtales
- Family: Melastomataceae
- Genus: Dinophora; Benth.

Genus of plants

Dinophora is a genus of flowering plants belonging to the family Melastomataceae.

Its native range is Western Tropical Africa to Angola.

Species:

- Dinophora spenneroides Benth.
