= Physeterostemon =

Scientific classification
- Kingdom: Plantae
- Clade: Tracheophytes
- Clade: Angiosperms
- Clade: Eudicots
- Clade: Rosids
- Order: Myrtales
- Family: Melastomataceae
- Genus: Physeterostemon; R.Goldenb. & Amorim

Genus of plants

Physeterostemon is a genus of flowering plants belonging to the family Melastomataceae.

Its native range is Northeastern Brazil.

Species:

- Physeterostemon aonae Amorim, Michelang. & R.Goldenb.
- Physeterostemon fiaschii R.Goldenb. & Amorim
- Physeterostemon gomesii Amorim & R.Goldenb.
- Physeterostemon jardimii R.Goldenb. & Amorim
- Physeterostemon thomasii Amorim, Michelang. & R.Goldenb.
