= Opisthocentra =

Scientific classification
- Kingdom: Plantae
- Clade: Tracheophytes
- Clade: Angiosperms
- Clade: Eudicots
- Clade: Rosids
- Order: Myrtales
- Family: Melastomataceae
- Genus: Opisthocentra; Hook.f.
- Species: O. clidemioides

Binomial name
- Opisthocentra clidemioides Hook.f.

Genus of plants

Opisthocentra is a monotypic genus of flowering plants belonging to the family Melastomataceae. The only species is Opisthocentra clidemioides.

Its native range is Colombia to Venezuela and Northern Brazil.
