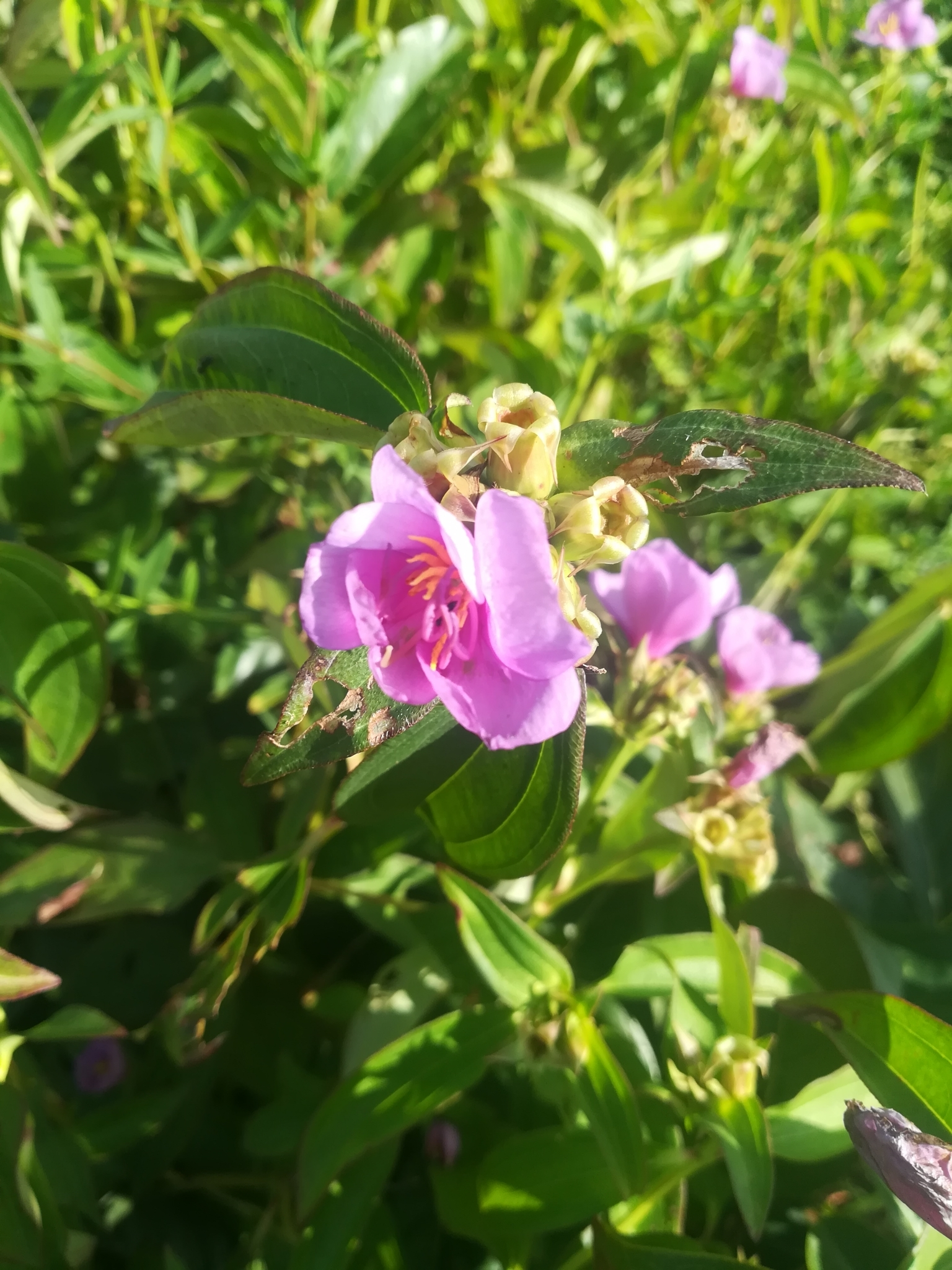
- Melastomastrum capitatum in Sierra Leone

Scientific classification
- Kingdom: Plantae
- Clade: Embryophytes
- Clade: Tracheophytes
- Clade: Angiosperms
- Clade: Eudicots
- Clade: Rosids
- Order: Myrtales
- Family: Melastomataceae
- Genus: Melastomastrum; Naudin

= Melastomastrum =

Genus of plants

Melastomastrum is a genus of flowering plants belonging to the family Melastomataceae.

Its native range is Tropical Africa to Namibia.

Species:

- Melastomastrum afzelii (Hook.f.) A.Fern. & R.Fern.
- Melastomastrum autranianum (Cogn.) A.Fern. & R.Fern.
- Melastomastrum capitatum (Vahl) A.Fern. & R.Fern.
- Melastomastrum cornifolium (Benth.) Jacq.-Fél.
- Melastomastrum porteresii (Jacq.-Fél.) Ver.-Lib. & G.Kadereit
- Melastomastrum segregatum (Benth.) A.Fern. & R.Fern.
- Melastomastrum theifolium (G.Don) A.Fern. & R.Fern.
