= Pterogastra =

Scientific classification
- Kingdom: Plantae
- Clade: Tracheophytes
- Clade: Angiosperms
- Clade: Eudicots
- Clade: Rosids
- Order: Myrtales
- Family: Melastomataceae
- Genus: Pterogastra; Naudin

Genus of plants

Pterogastra is a genus of flowering plants belonging to the family Melastomataceae.

Its native range is Northern and Western South America.

Species:

- Pterogastra divaricata (Bonpl.) Naudin
- Pterogastra minor Naudin
