= Dalenia =

Scientific classification
- Kingdom: Plantae
- Clade: Tracheophytes
- Clade: Angiosperms
- Clade: Eudicots
- Clade: Rosids
- Order: Myrtales
- Family: Melastomataceae
- Genus: Dalenia; Korth. (1844)

Species
- 9; see text

Genus of plants

Dalenia is a genus of flowering plants in family Melastomataceae. It includes nine species native to Borneo and New Guinea.

- Dalenia beccariana (Cogn.) Ridl. ex M.P.Nayar
- Dalenia glabra (Merr.) Karton.
- Dalenia glandulosa (Merr.) Karton.
- Dalenia laevis (Ohwi ex J.F.Maxwell) Karton.
- Dalenia latifolia (Triana) Karton.
- Dalenia magnibracteata (Bakh.f.) Karton.
- Dalenia papuana (Mansf.) Karton.
- Dalenia pulchra Korth.
- Dalenia sarawakensis (M.P.Nayar) Karton.
