= Preussiella =

Scientific classification
- Kingdom: Plantae
- Clade: Tracheophytes
- Clade: Angiosperms
- Clade: Eudicots
- Clade: Rosids
- Order: Myrtales
- Family: Melastomataceae
- Genus: Preussiella; Gilg

Genus of flowering plants

Preussiella is a genus of flowering plants belonging to the family Melastomataceae.

Its native range is western and western central Tropical Africa, in the countries of Cameroon, Gabon, Ghana, Guinea, Gulf of Guinea Island, Ivory Coast and Liberia.

The genus name of Preussiella is in honour of Paul Rudolf Preuss (1861–1926), a German botanist and researcher. He founded and directed a botanical garden in Kamerun (now called Cameroon). It was first described and published in Nat. Pflanzenfam., Nachtr. Vol.1 on page 267 in 1897.

Known species, according to Kew:

- Preussiella gabonensis Jacq.-Fél.
- Preussiella kamerunensis Gilg
