= Allomaieta =

Scientific classification
- Kingdom: Plantae
- Clade: Tracheophytes
- Clade: Angiosperms
- Clade: Eudicots
- Clade: Rosids
- Order: Myrtales
- Family: Melastomataceae
- Genus: Allomaieta; Gleason

Genus of flowering plants

Allomaieta is a genus of flowering plants belonging to the family Melastomataceae.

Its native range is Colombia.

Species:

- Allomaieta caucana Lozano
- Allomaieta ebejicosana Lozano
- Allomaieta grandiflora Gleason
- Allomaieta hirsuta (Gleason) Lozano
- Allomaieta javierbarrigae Humberto Mend.
- Allomaieta pancurana Lozano
- Allomaieta strigosa (Gleason) Lozano
- Allomaieta villosa (Gleason) Lozano
- Allomaieta zenufanasana Lozano
