= Comolia =

Scientific classification
- Kingdom: Plantae
- Clade: Tracheophytes
- Clade: Angiosperms
- Clade: Eudicots
- Clade: Rosids
- Order: Myrtales
- Family: Melastomataceae
- Genus: Comolia; DC.

Genus of flowering plants

Comolia is a genus of flowering plants belonging to the family Melastomataceae.

Its native range is Trinidad to Southern Tropical America.

Species:

- Comolia anomala Pittier
- Comolia berberifolia DC.
- Comolia bracteosa Huber
- Comolia latifolia Cogn.
- Comolia leptophylla (Bonpl.) Naudin
- Comolia microphylla Benth.
- Comolia nummularioides (Bonpl.) Naudin
- Comolia ovalifolia Triana
- Comolia prostrata Wurdack
- Comolia serpyllacea Wurdack
- Comolia smithii Wurdack
- Comolia vernicosa Triana
- Comolia villosa Triana
