= Sporoxeia =

Scientific classification
- Kingdom: Plantae
- Clade: Tracheophytes
- Clade: Angiosperms
- Clade: Eudicots
- Clade: Rosids
- Order: Myrtales
- Family: Melastomataceae
- Genus: Sporoxeia; W.W.Sm.

Genus of plants

Sporoxeia is a genus of flowering plants belonging to the family Melastomataceae.

Its native range is Southern Central China to Indo-China.

Species:

- Sporoxeia blastifolia (Guillaumin) C.Hansen
- Sporoxeia clavicalcarata C.Chen
- Sporoxeia imparifolia C.Hansen
- Sporoxeia ochthocharioides C.Hansen
- Sporoxeia petelotii (Merr.) C.Hansen
- Sporoxeia rosea (Guillaumin) C.Hansen
- Sporoxeia sciadophila W.W.Sm.
