= Cailliella =

Scientific classification
- Kingdom: Plantae
- Clade: Tracheophytes
- Clade: Angiosperms
- Clade: Eudicots
- Clade: Rosids
- Order: Myrtales
- Family: Melastomataceae
- Genus: Cailliella; Jacq.-Fél.

Genus of flowering plants

Cailliella is a genus of flowering plants belonging to the family Melastomataceae.

Its native range is Guinea.

Species:

- Cailliella praerupticola Jacq.-Fél.
