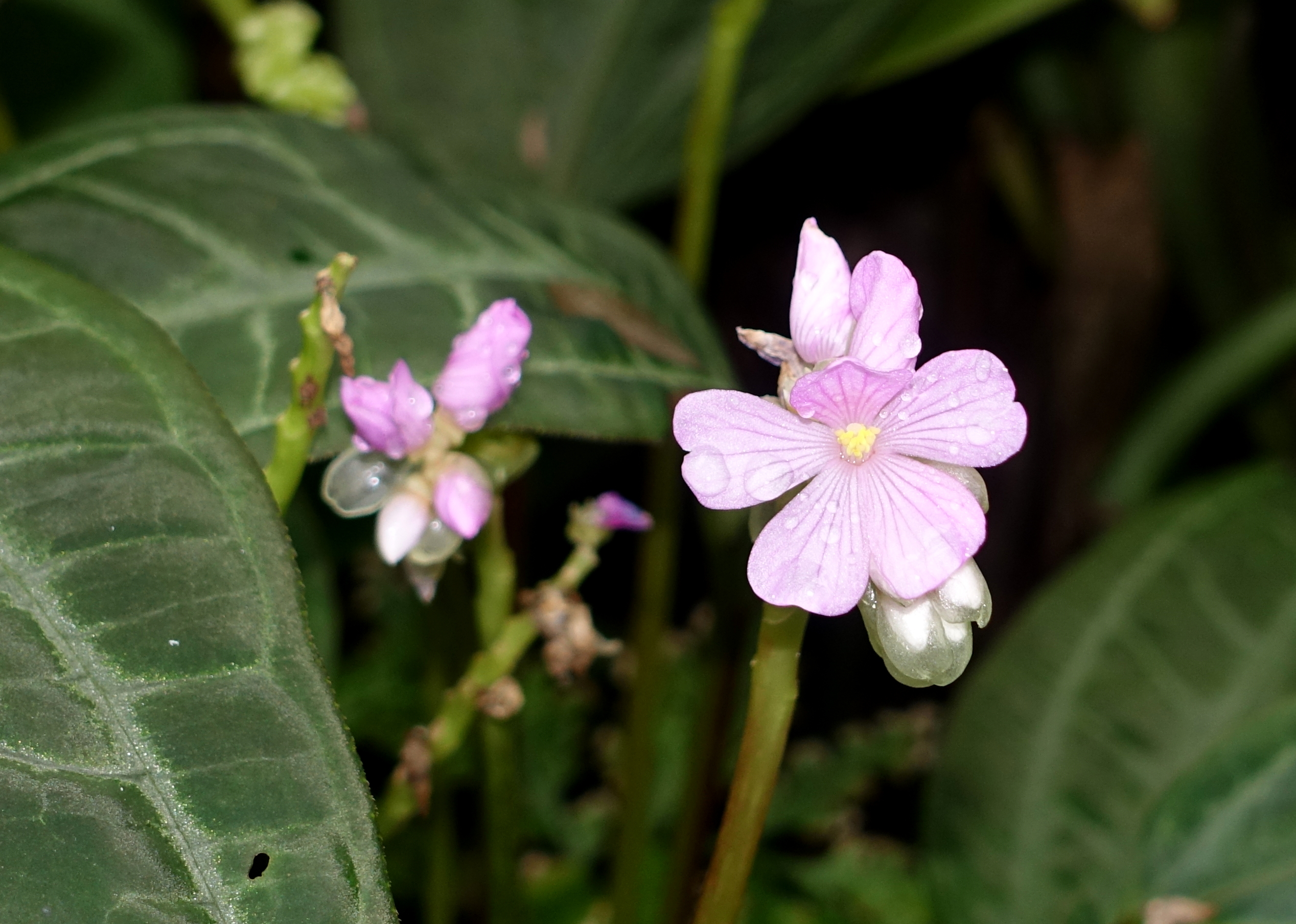
- Monolena primuliflora

Scientific classification
- Kingdom: Plantae
- Clade: Tracheophytes
- Clade: Angiosperms
- Clade: Eudicots
- Clade: Rosids
- Order: Myrtales
- Family: Melastomataceae
- Genus: Monolena; Triana ex Benth. & Hook. f.

Species
- See text

= Monolena =

Genus of epiphytes

Monolena is a genus of flowering plants, of the family Melastomataceae, consisting of about 15 species distributed from Guatemala to Peru and Acre, Brazil. They are primarily herbs of the wet tropical and cloud forests, often growing as epiphytes, but sometimes on rocks and in riparian zones near mountain streams.

== Accepted species ==
- Monolena dressleri R.H. Warner
- Monolena grandiloba R.H. Warner
- Monolena guatemalensis Donn. Sm.
- Monolena morleyi R.H. Warner
- Monolena multiflora R.H. Warner
- Monolena panamensis R.H. Warner
- Monolena primuliflora Hook. f.
- Monolena trichopoda R.H. Warner
