= Poteranthera =

Scientific classification
- Kingdom: Plantae
- Clade: Tracheophytes
- Clade: Angiosperms
- Clade: Eudicots
- Clade: Rosids
- Order: Myrtales
- Family: Melastomataceae
- Genus: Poteranthera; Bong.

Genus of plants

Poteranthera is a genus of flowering plants belonging to the family Melastomataceae.

Its native range is Southern Tropical America.

Species:

- Poteranthera annectans Wurdack
- Poteranthera leptalea (Almeda) M.J.Rocha, P.J.Guim. & R.Romero
- Poteranthera pusilla Bong.
- Poteranthera warmingii (Cogn.) Almeda & R.B.Pacifico
- Poteranthera windischii Kriebel
