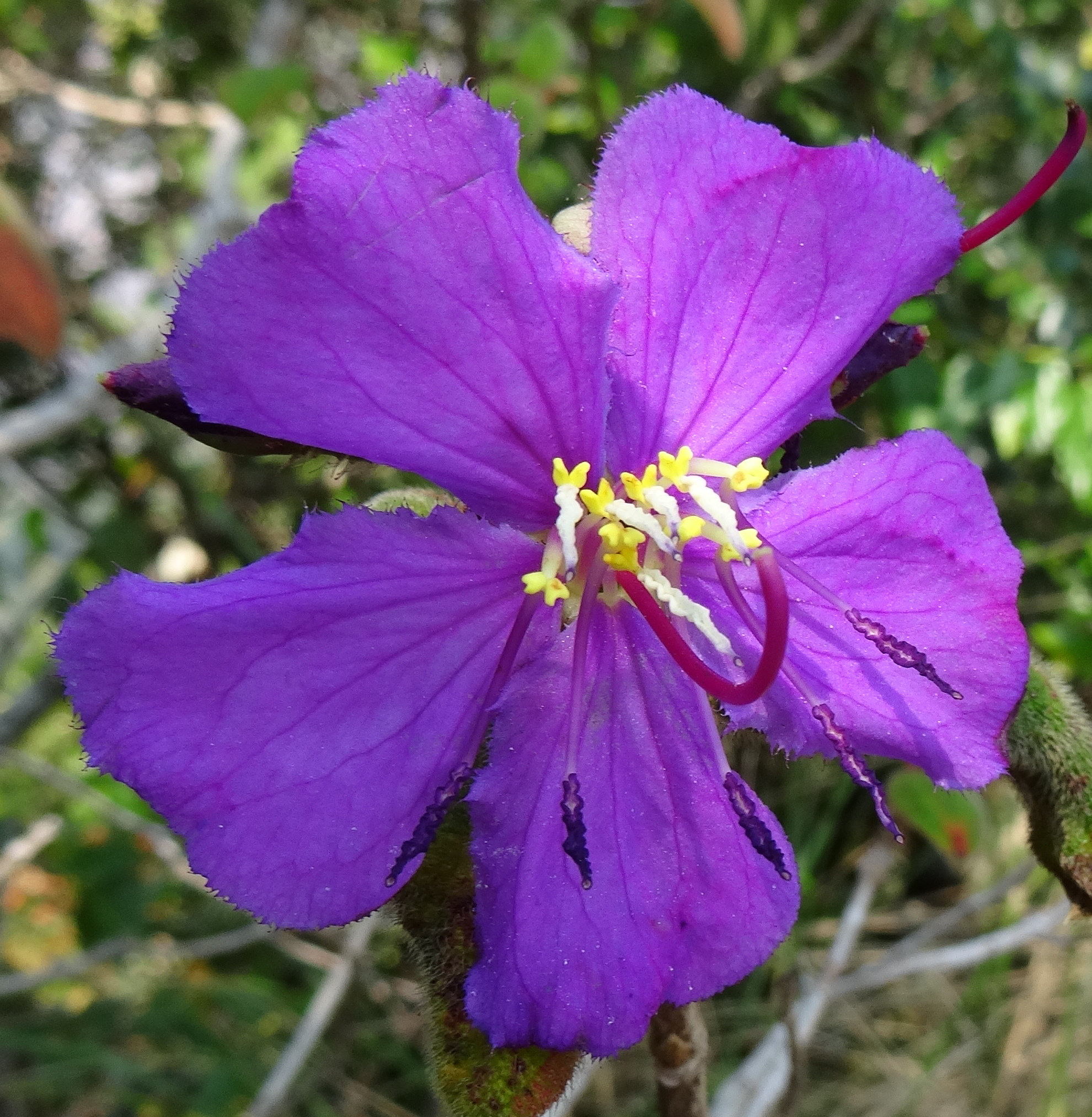
- Dissotidendron melleri

Scientific classification
- Kingdom: Plantae
- Clade: Tracheophytes
- Clade: Angiosperms
- Clade: Eudicots
- Clade: Rosids
- Order: Myrtales
- Family: Melastomataceae
- Genus: Dissotidendron (A.Fern. & R.Fern.) Ver.-Lib. & G.Kadereit

= Dissotidendron =

Genus of plants

Dissotidendron is a genus of flowering plants belonging to the family Melastomataceae.

Its native range is Cameroon to Tanzania and Southern Tropical Africa.

Species:

- Dissotidendron apricum (Gilg ex Engl.) Ver.-Lib. & G.Kadereit
- Dissotidendron arborescens (A.Fern. & R.Fern.) Ver.-Lib. & G.Kadereit
- Dissotidendron bussei (Gilg ex Engl.) Ver.-Lib. & G.Kadereit
- Dissotidendron caloneurum (Gilg ex Engl.) Ver.-Lib. & G.Kadereit
- Dissotidendron cordatum (Gilg) Ver.-Lib. & G.Kadereit
- Dissotidendron dichaetantheroides (Wickens) Ver.-Lib. & G.Kadereit
- Dissotidendron glandulicalyx (Wickens) Ver.-Lib. & G.Kadereit
- Dissotidendron johnstonianum (Baker f.) Ver.-Lib. & G.Kadereit
- Dissotidendron lanatum (A.Fern. & R.Fern.) Ver.-Lib. & G.Kadereit
- Dissotidendron melleri (Hook.f.) Ver.-Lib. & G.Kadereit
- Dissotidendron polyanthum (Gilg) Ver.-Lib. & G.Kadereit
