= Mendelia =

Scientific classification
- Kingdom: Plantae
- Clade: Tracheophytes
- Clade: Angiosperms
- Clade: Eudicots
- Clade: Rosids
- Order: Myrtales
- Family: Melastomataceae
- Subfamily: Melastomatoideae
- Tribe: Sonerileae
- Genus: Mendelia; Ver.-Lib. & G.Kadereit
- Species: M. mollis

Binomial name
- Mendelia mollis (Hook.f.) Ver.-Lib. & G.Kadereit

Synonyms
- Amphiblemma erythropodum Gilg & Ledermann ex Engl.; Amphiblemma molle Hook.f. (1871) (basionym); Amphiblemma riparium Gilg

Genus of flowering plants

Mendelia is a genus of flowering plants in the family Melastomataceae. It includes a single species, Mendelia mollis, which is native to west-central tropical Africa, ranging from Cameroon to Angola.
