= Castratella =

Scientific classification
- Kingdom: Plantae
- Clade: Tracheophytes
- Clade: Angiosperms
- Clade: Eudicots
- Clade: Rosids
- Order: Myrtales
- Family: Melastomataceae
- Genus: Castratella; Naudin

Genus of flowering plants

Castratella is a genus of flowering plant belonging to the family Melastomataceae.

Its native range is Colombia and Venezuela.

Species:

- Castratella piloselloides Naudin
- Castratella rosea Gleason
