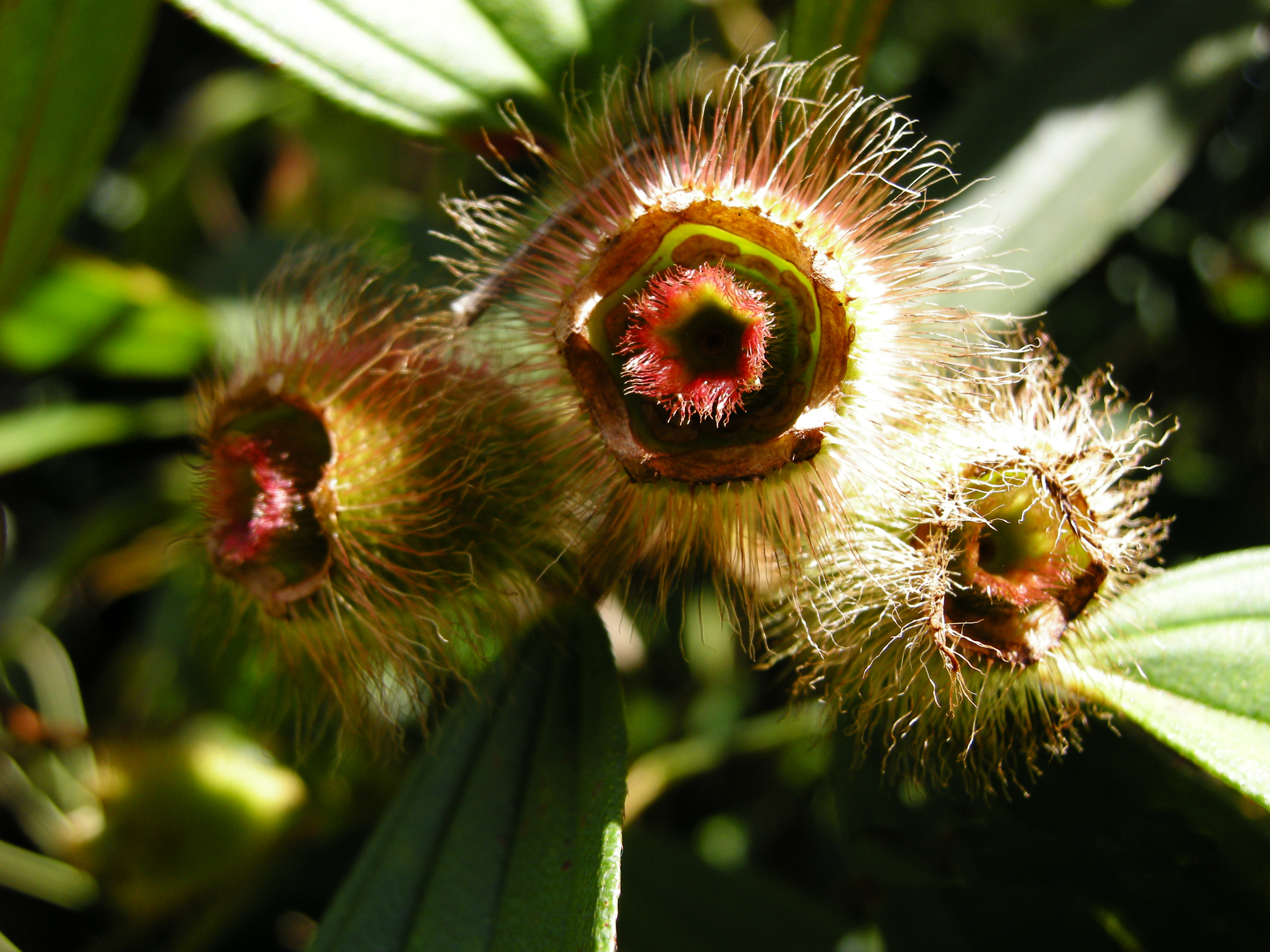
- MelastomaV9628.

Scientific classification
- Kingdom: Plantae
- Clade: Tracheophytes
- Clade: Angiosperms
- Clade: Eudicots
- Clade: Rosids
- Order: Myrtales
- Family: Melastomataceae
- Genus: Desmoscelis; Naudin

= Desmoscelis =

Genus of flowering plants

Desmoscelis is a genus of flowering plants belonging to the family Melastomataceae.

Its native range is Southern Tropical America.

Species:

- Desmoscelis calcarata Triana
- Desmoscelis villosa (Aubl.) Naudin
