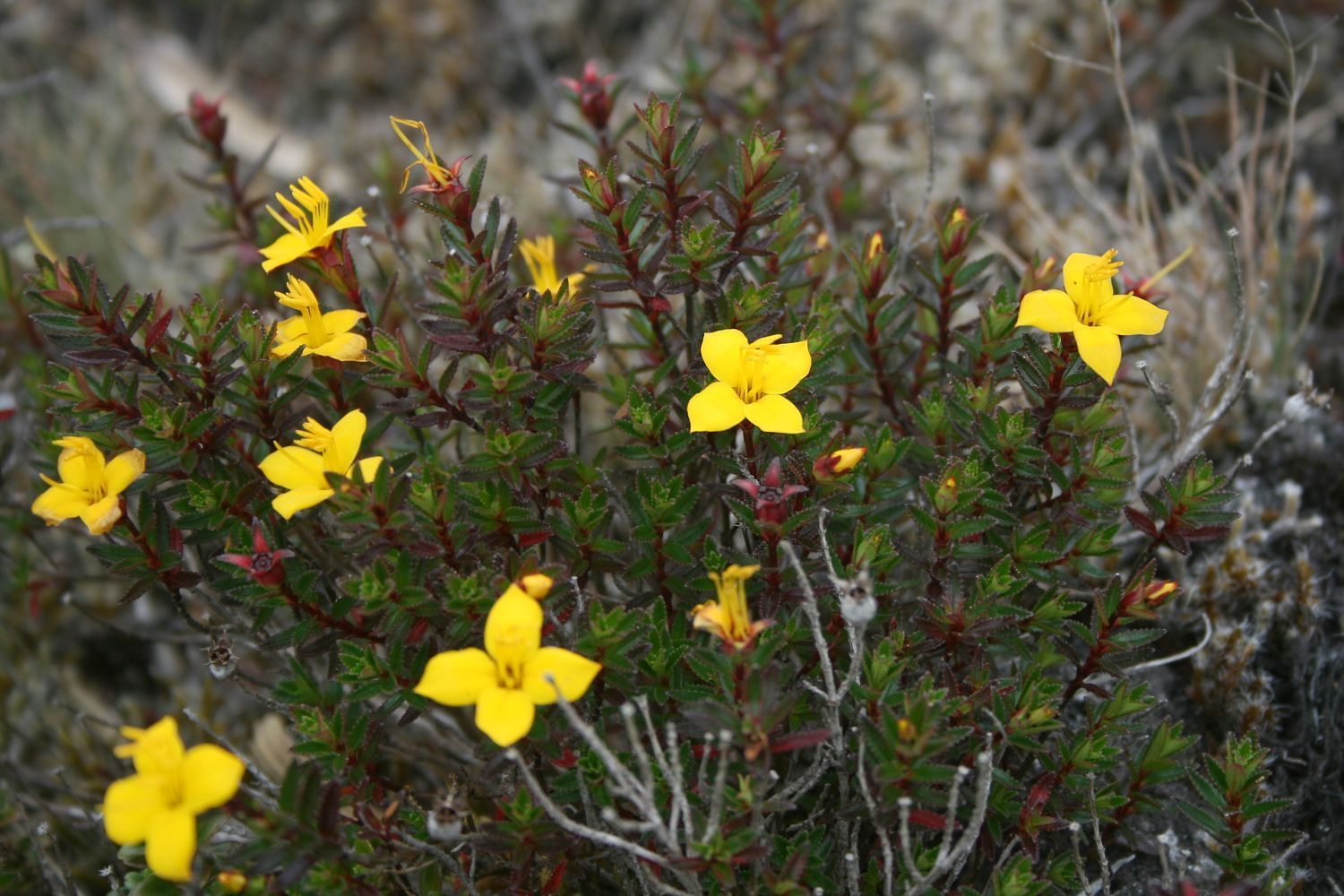
- Chaetolepis cufodontisii

Scientific classification
- Kingdom: Plantae
- Clade: Tracheophytes
- Clade: Angiosperms
- Clade: Eudicots
- Clade: Rosids
- Order: Myrtales
- Family: Melastomataceae
- Genus: Chaetolepis (DC.) Miq.

= Chaetolepis =

Genus of flowering plants

Chaetolepis is a genus of flowering plants belonging to the family Melastomataceae.

Its native range is Costa Rica to Guyana.

Species:

- Chaetolepis alpina Naudin
- Chaetolepis anisandra Naudin
- Chaetolepis cufodontisii Standl.
- Chaetolepis lindeniana Triana
- Chaetolepis loricarella Triana
- Chaetolepis microphylla Miq.
- Chaetolepis perijensis Wurdack
- Chaetolepis phelpsiae Gleason
- Chaetolepis santamartensis Wurdack
- Chaetolepis sessilis Pittier
- Chaetolepis sumapacensis Humberto Mend. & C. Castro, 2023
