= Pilocosta =

Scientific classification
- Kingdom: Plantae
- Clade: Tracheophytes
- Clade: Angiosperms
- Clade: Eudicots
- Clade: Rosids
- Order: Myrtales
- Family: Melastomataceae
- Genus: Pilocosta; Almeda & Whiffin

Genus of plants

Pilocosta is a genus of flowering plants belonging to the family Melastomataceae. Its native range is Costa Rica to Ecuador.

Species:

- Pilocosta campanensis (Almeda & Whiffin) Almeda
- Pilocosta erythrophylla (Gleason) Almeda & Whiffin
- Pilocosta nana (Standl.) Almeda & Whiffin
- Pilocosta nubicola Almeda
- Pilocosta oerstedii (Triana) Almeda & Whiffin
