= Nephoanthus =

Scientific classification
- Kingdom: Plantae
- Clade: Tracheophytes
- Clade: Angiosperms
- Clade: Eudicots
- Clade: Rosids
- Order: Myrtales
- Family: Melastomataceae
- Subfamily: Melastomatoideae
- Tribe: Sonerileae
- Genus: Nephoanthus; C.W.Lin & T.C.Hsu

Species
- Nephoanthus nubigenus C.W.Lin, Luu & T.C.Hsu; Nephoanthus prostratus (C.Hansen) C.W.Lin & T.C.Hsu

Genus of flowering plants

Nephoanthus is a genus of flowering plants in the family Melastomataceae. It includes two species endemic to Vietnam.

- Nephoanthus nubigenus C.W.Lin, Luu & T.C.Hsu
- Nephoanthus prostratus (C.Hansen) C.W.Lin & T.C.Hsu
