= Pseudoernestia =

Scientific classification
- Kingdom: Plantae
- Clade: Tracheophytes
- Clade: Angiosperms
- Clade: Eudicots
- Clade: Rosids
- Order: Myrtales
- Family: Melastomataceae
- Genus: Pseudoernestia; Krasser

Genus of plants

Pseudoernestia is a genus of flowering plants belonging to the family Melastomataceae.

Its native range is Southern Tropical America.

Species:

- Pseudoernestia cordifolia (O.Berg ex Triana) Krasser
- Pseudoernestia glandulosa (Gleason) M.J.Rocha & P.J.F.Guim.
