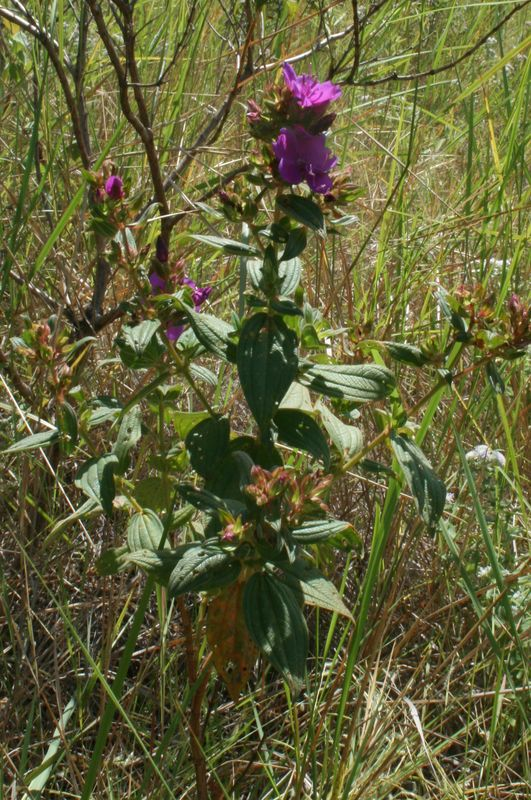
- Rhynchanthera grandiflora

Scientific classification
- Kingdom: Plantae
- Clade: Tracheophytes
- Clade: Angiosperms
- Clade: Eudicots
- Clade: Rosids
- Order: Myrtales
- Family: Melastomataceae
- Genus: Rhynchanthera; DC.

= Rhynchanthera =

Genus of plants

Rhynchanthera is a genus of flowering plants belonging to the family Melastomataceae.

Its native range is Mexico to Southern Tropical America.

Species:

- Rhynchanthera acuminata Benth.
- Rhynchanthera apurensis Wurdack
- Rhynchanthera brachyrhyncha Cham.
- Rhynchanthera bracteata Triana
- Rhynchanthera cordata DC.
- Rhynchanthera dichotoma DC.
- Rhynchanthera gardneri Naudin
- Rhynchanthera grandiflora DC.
- Rhynchanthera hassleriana Kraenzl.
- Rhynchanthera hispida Naudin
- Rhynchanthera latifolia Cogn.
- Rhynchanthera mexicana DC.
- Rhynchanthera novemnervia DC.
- Rhynchanthera paludicola Gleason
- Rhynchanthera rosea Cogn.
- Rhynchanthera serrulata DC.
- Rhynchanthera ternata Cogn.
- Rhynchanthera ursina Naudin
- Rhynchanthera verbenoides Cham.
