= Plagiopetalum =

Scientific classification
- Kingdom: Plantae
- Clade: Tracheophytes
- Clade: Angiosperms
- Clade: Eudicots
- Clade: Rosids
- Order: Myrtales
- Family: Melastomataceae
- Genus: Plagiopetalum; Rehder

Genus of plants

Plagiopetalum is a genus of flowering plants belonging to the family Melastomataceae.

Its native range is Assam to Southern China and Indo-China.

Species:

- Plagiopetalum esquirolii (H.Lév.) Rehder
- Plagiopetalum serratum (Diels) Diels
- Plagiopetalum tenuicaule (C.Chen) C.Hansen
