= Pseudodissochaeta =

Scientific classification
- Kingdom: Plantae
- Clade: Tracheophytes
- Clade: Angiosperms
- Clade: Eudicots
- Clade: Rosids
- Order: Myrtales
- Family: Melastomataceae
- Genus: Pseudodissochaeta; Nayar

Genus of plants

Pseudodissochaeta is a genus of flowering plants belonging to the family Melastomataceae.

Its native range is Eastern Himalaya to Southern China and Indo-China.

Species:

- Pseudodissochaeta assamica (C.B.Clarke) Nayar
- Pseudodissochaeta lanceata Nayar
- Pseudodissochaeta raphioides C.Hansen
- Pseudodissochaeta septentrionalis (W.W.Sm.) Nayar
- Pseudodissochaeta spirei (Guillaumin) Veldkamp & J.F.Maxwell
- Pseudodissochaeta subsessilis (Craib) Nayar
