= Tryssophyton =

Scientific classification
- Kingdom: Plantae
- Clade: Tracheophytes
- Clade: Angiosperms
- Clade: Eudicots
- Clade: Rosids
- Order: Myrtales
- Family: Melastomataceae
- Genus: Tryssophyton; Wurdack

Genus of flowering plants

Tryssophyton is a genus of flowering plants belonging to the family Melastomataceae.

Its native range is Guyana.

Species:

- Tryssophyton merumense Wurdack
- Tryssophyton quadrifolius K.Wurdack & Michelang.
