= Quipuanthus =

Scientific classification
- Kingdom: Plantae
- Clade: Tracheophytes
- Clade: Angiosperms
- Clade: Eudicots
- Clade: Rosids
- Order: Myrtales
- Family: Melastomataceae
- Genus: Quipuanthus; Michelang. & C.Ulloa

Genus of plants

Quipuanthus is a genus of flowering plants belonging to the family Melastomataceae.

Its native range is Ecuador to Northern Peru, and North of Colombia.

Species:

- Quipuanthus epipetricus Michelang. & C.Ulloa
- Quipuanthus calcaratus J.S.Murillo & Michelang.
