= Heteroblemma =

Scientific classification
- Kingdom: Plantae
- Clade: Tracheophytes
- Clade: Angiosperms
- Clade: Eudicots
- Clade: Rosids
- Order: Myrtales
- Family: Melastomataceae
- Genus: Heteroblemma (Blume) Cámara-Leret, Ridd.-Num. & Veldkamp

Genus of plants

Heteroblemma is a genus of flowering plants belonging to the family Melastomataceae.

Its native range is Vietnam to Wester. Malesia, New Guinea.

Species:

- Heteroblemma alternifolium (Blume) Cámara-Leret, Ridd.-Num. & Veldkamp
- Heteroblemma barbatum (Bakh.f.) Cámara-Leret, Ridd.-Num. & Veldkamp
- Heteroblemma bisetosum (Bakh.f.) Cámara-Leret, Ridd.-Num. & Veldkamp
- Heteroblemma capillipes (Regalado) Cámara-Leret, Ridd.-Num. & Veldkamp
- Heteroblemma clemensiae Cámara-Leret
- Heteroblemma cordatum Cámara-Leret
- Heteroblemma coronatum Cámara-Leret
- Heteroblemma decurrens (Cogn.) Cámara-Leret, Ridd.-Num. & Veldkamp
- Heteroblemma flagellatum (Stapf) Cámara-Leret, Ridd.-Num. & Veldkamp
- Heteroblemma formanii (Regalado) Cámara-Leret, Ridd.-Num. & Veldkamp
- Heteroblemma kemulense (Regalado) Cámara-Leret, Ridd.-Num. & Veldkamp
- Heteroblemma loratum (Stapf) Cámara-Leret, Ridd.-Num. & Veldkamp
- Heteroblemma sandakanense (Regalado) Cámara-Leret, Ridd.-Num. & Veldkamp
- Heteroblemma serpens (Stapf) Cámara-Leret, Ridd.-Num. & Veldkamp
- Heteroblemma sibauense H.Okada, Tsukaya & Soejima
