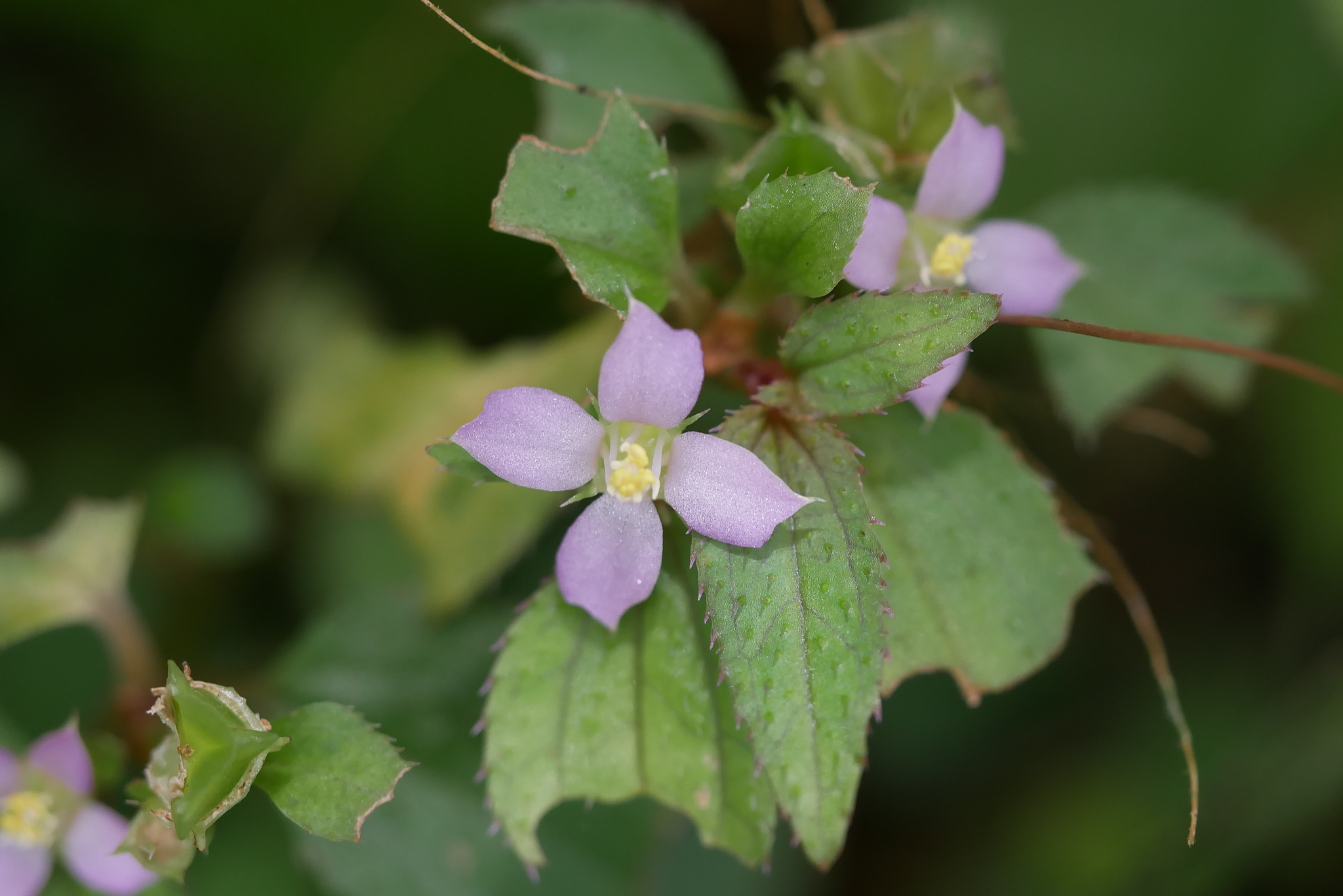
- Sarcopyramis napalensis

Scientific classification
- Kingdom: Plantae
- Clade: Tracheophytes
- Clade: Angiosperms
- Clade: Eudicots
- Clade: Rosids
- Order: Myrtales
- Family: Melastomataceae
- Genus: Sarcopyramis; Wall.

= Sarcopyramis =

Genus of plants

Sarcopyramis is a genus of flowering plants in the family Melastomataceae. Its native range is tropical and subtropical Asia.

== Species ==
The following four species are recognised in the genus Sarcopyramis:

- Sarcopyramis bodinieri H.Lév.
- Sarcopyramis gracilis O.Schwartz
- Sarcopyramis napalensis Wall.
- Sarcopyramis subramanii M.P.Nayar
