= Bourdaria =

Scientific classification
- Kingdom: Plantae
- Clade: Tracheophytes
- Clade: Angiosperms
- Clade: Eudicots
- Clade: Rosids
- Order: Myrtales
- Family: Melastomataceae
- Genus: Bourdaria; A.Chev. (1932)
- Species: B. felicis

Binomial name
- Bourdaria felicis A.Chev. (1932)

Synonyms
- Cincinnobotrys felicis (A.Chev.) Jacq.-Fél. (1976)

Genus of flowering plants

Bourdaria felicis is a species of flowering plant in family Melastomataceae. It is a begonia-like herbaceous plant native to Guinea and Sierra Leone. It grows in moist shady places as an epiphyte or as a lithophyte on rocks with moss. It is the sole species in genus Bourdaria.
