= Boyania =

Scientific classification
- Kingdom: Plantae
- Clade: Tracheophytes
- Clade: Angiosperms
- Clade: Eudicots
- Clade: Rosids
- Order: Myrtales
- Family: Melastomataceae
- Genus: Boyania; Wurdack

Genus of flowering plants

Boyania is a genus of flowering plants belonging to the family Melastomataceae.

Its native range is Colombia and Guyana.

Species:

- Boyania ayangannae Wurdack
- Boyania colombiana Humberto Mend.
