= Centradeniastrum =

Scientific classification
- Kingdom: Plantae
- Clade: Tracheophytes
- Clade: Angiosperms
- Clade: Eudicots
- Clade: Rosids
- Order: Myrtales
- Family: Melastomataceae
- Genus: Centradeniastrum; Cogn.

Genus of plants

Centradeniastrum is a genus of flowering plants belonging to the family Melastomataceae.

Its native range is Colombia, Peru and Ecuador.

Species:

- Centradeniastrum album Gleason
- Centradeniastrum roseum Cogn.
