= Loricalepis =

Scientific classification
- Kingdom: Plantae
- Clade: Tracheophytes
- Clade: Angiosperms
- Clade: Eudicots
- Clade: Rosids
- Order: Myrtales
- Family: Melastomataceae
- Genus: Loricalepis; Brade
- Species: L. duckei

Binomial name
- Loricalepis duckei Brade

Genus of plants

Loricalepis is a monotypic genus of flowering plants belonging to the family Melastomataceae. The only species is Loricalepis duckei.

Its native range is Northern Brazil.
