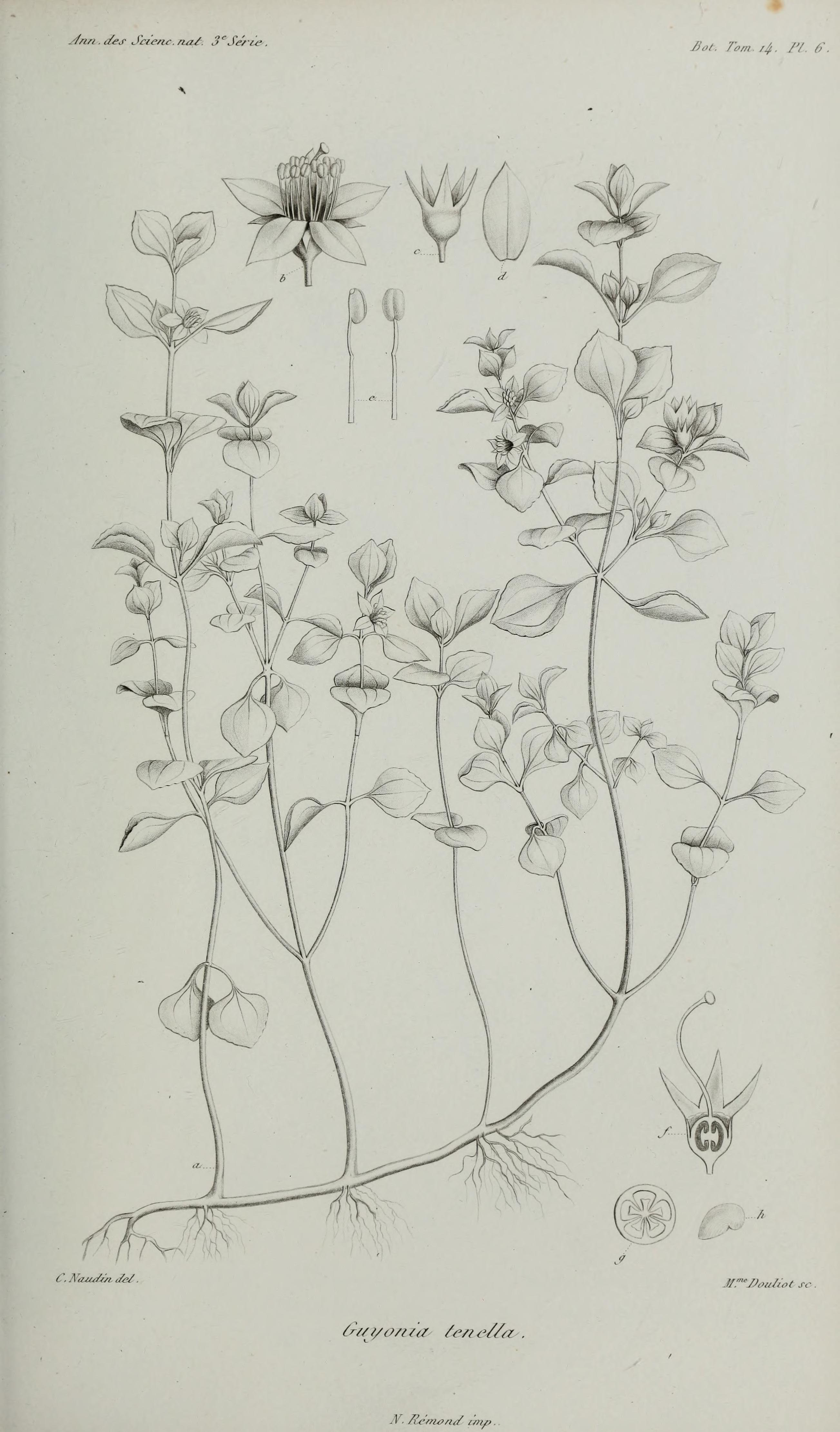
- Guyonia tenella

Scientific classification
- Kingdom: Plantae
- Clade: Tracheophytes
- Clade: Angiosperms
- Clade: Eudicots
- Clade: Rosids
- Order: Myrtales
- Family: Melastomataceae
- Genus: Guyonia; Naudin

Synonyms
- Afzeliella Gilg

= Guyonia =

Genus of plants

Guyonia is a genus of flowering plants belonging to the family Melastomataceae.

Its native range is Tropical Africa. It is found in the countries of Angola, Cameroon, Central African Republic, Congo, Equatorial Guinea, Gabon, Guinea, Gulf of Guinea Is., Ivory Coast, Liberia, Nigeria, Sierra Leone, Sudan, Tanzania, Uganda, Zambia and Zaire.

The genus name of Guyonia is in honour of Jean Guyon (1794–1870), a French military doctor and chief military surgeon in Algeria. It was first described and published in Ann. Sci. Nat., Bot., séries 3, Vol.14 on page 149 in 1850.

== Known species ==
According to Kew:

- Guyonia antennina (Sm.) Ver.-Lib. & R.D.Stone
- Guyonia arenaria (Jacq.-Fél.) Ver.-Lib. & R.D.Stone
- Guyonia ciliata Hook.f.
- Guyonia cinerascens (Hutch.) Ver.-Lib. & R.D.Stone
- Guyonia entii (J.B.Hall) Ver.-Lib. & R.D.Stone
- Guyonia glandulosa (A.Fern. & R.Fern.) Ver.-Lib. & R.D.Stone
- Guyonia humilis (A.Chev. & Jacq.-Fél.) Ver.-Lib. & R.D.Stone
- Guyonia jacquesii (A.Chev.) Ver.-Lib. & R.D.Stone
- Guyonia pygmaea (A.Chev. & Jacq.-Fél.) Ver.-Lib. & R.D.Stone
- Guyonia rupicola (Gilg ex Engl.) Ver.-Lib. & R.D.Stone
- Guyonia seretii (De Wild.) Ver.-Lib. & R.D.Stone
- Guyonia sylvestris (Jacq.-Fél.) Ver.-Lib. & R.D.Stone
- Guyonia tenella Naudin
