= Cyphotheca =

Scientific classification
- Kingdom: Plantae
- Clade: Tracheophytes
- Clade: Angiosperms
- Clade: Eudicots
- Clade: Rosids
- Order: Myrtales
- Family: Melastomataceae
- Genus: Cyphotheca; Diels

Genus of flowering plants

Cyphotheca is a genus of flowering plants belonging to the family Melastomataceae.

Its native range is Southern Central China.

Species:

- Cyphotheca montana Diels
