= Oxyspora =

Scientific classification
- Kingdom: Plantae
- Clade: Tracheophytes
- Clade: Angiosperms
- Clade: Eudicots
- Clade: Rosids
- Order: Myrtales
- Family: Melastomataceae
- Genus: Oxyspora; DC.

Genus of plants

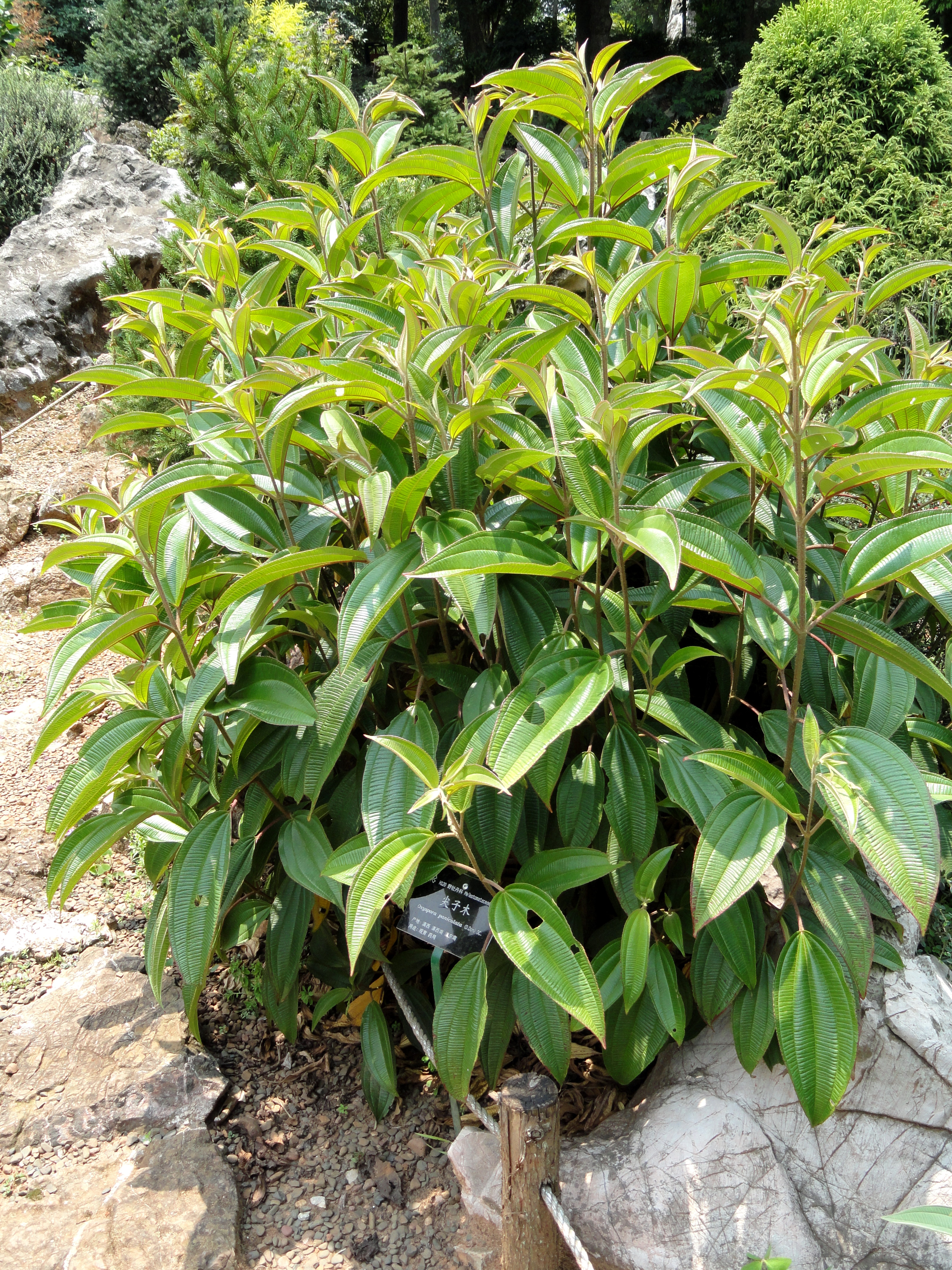
Oxyspora Paniculata in the Kunming Botanical Garden, Yunnan, China

Oxyspora is a genus of flowering plants belonging to the family Melastomataceae.

Its native range is Tropical and Subtropical Asia.

Species:

- Oxyspora acutangula King
- Oxyspora auriculata (Ridl.) J.F.Maxwell
- Oxyspora balansae (Cogn.) J.F.Maxwell
- Oxyspora beccarii (Cogn.) J.F.Maxwell
- Oxyspora bullata (Griff.) J.F.Maxwell
- Oxyspora cernua Hook.f. & Thomson ex Triana
- Oxyspora cordata (Stapf) C.Hansen
- Oxyspora curtisii King
- Oxyspora exigua (Jack) J.F.Maxwell
- Oxyspora floribunda Ridl.
- Oxyspora hirta Ridl.
- Oxyspora hispida Ridl.
- Oxyspora howellii Jeffrey & W.W.Sm.
- Oxyspora longisetosa (Ridl.) J.F.Maxwell
- Oxyspora macrophylla Triana
- Oxyspora microflora J.F.Maxwell
- Oxyspora ovata (Ridl.) C.Hansen
- Oxyspora paniculata DC.
- Oxyspora racemosa Ridl.
- Oxyspora sagittata (Bakh.f.) J.F.Maxwell
- Oxyspora scabrida Ridl.
- Oxyspora senguptae Subram. & Nayar
- Oxyspora stellulata King
- Oxyspora sublepidota (King) J.F.Maxwell
- Oxyspora sumatrana Merr.
- Oxyspora teretipetiolata (C.Y.Wu & C.Chen) W.H.Chen & Y.M.Shui
- Oxyspora umbellata (Hook.f. ex Triana) J.F.Maxwell
- Oxyspora urophylla (Diels) Y.M.Shui
- Oxyspora vagans Wall.
- Oxyspora wrayi (King) J.F.Maxwell
- Oxyspora yunnanensis H.L.Li
