= Scorpiothyrsus =

Scientific classification
- Kingdom: Plantae
- Clade: Tracheophytes
- Clade: Angiosperms
- Clade: Eudicots
- Clade: Rosids
- Order: Myrtales
- Family: Melastomataceae
- Genus: Scorpiothyrsus; H.L.Li

Genus of plants

Scorpiothyrsus is a genus of flowering plants belonging to the family Melastomataceae.

Its native range is Southeastern China to Hainan.

Species:

- Scorpiothyrsus erythrotrichus (Merr. & Chun) H.L.Li
- Scorpiothyrsus shangszeensis C.Chen
- Scorpiothyrsus xanthostictus (Merr. & Chun) H.L.Li
