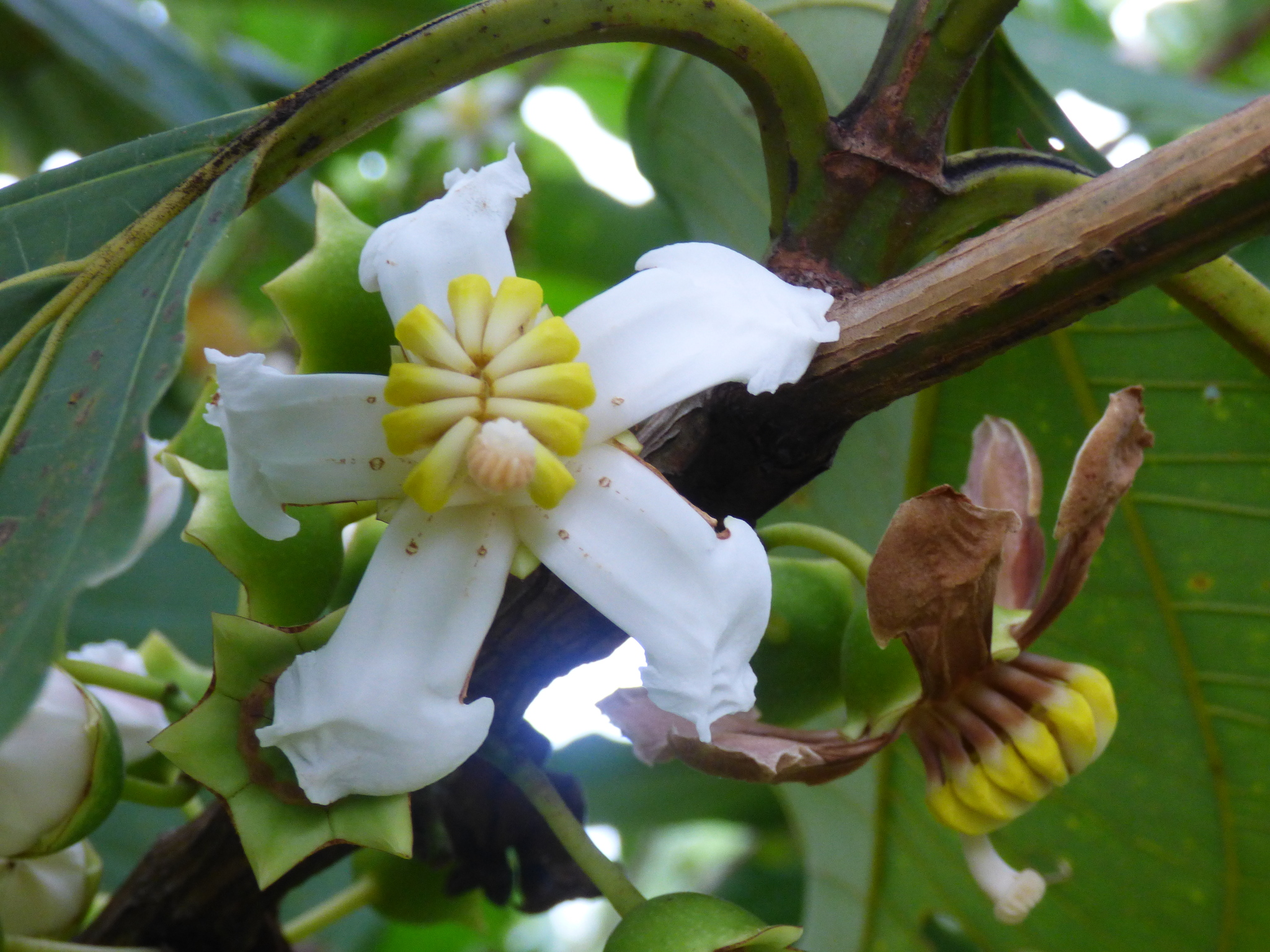
- Bellucia pentamera

Scientific classification
- Kingdom: Plantae
- Clade: Tracheophytes
- Clade: Angiosperms
- Clade: Eudicots
- Clade: Rosids
- Order: Myrtales
- Family: Melastomataceae
- Genus: Bellucia; Neck. ex Raf. Benth., 1838

Type species
- Bellucia grossularioides

Synonyms
- Apatitia Ham.; Axinanthera H.Karst.; Heteroneuron Hook.f.; Loreya DC.; Myriaspora DC.; Webera J.F.Gmel.

= Bellucia =

Genus of flowering plants

Bellucia is a genus of plants in the family Melastomataceae.

== Species ==
Species as of 2020 from Catalogue of Life:

- Bellucia acutata Pilg.
- Bellucia aequiloba Pilg.
- Bellucia arborescens (Aubl.) Baill.
- Bellucia beckii S.S.Renner
- Bellucia dichotoma Cogn.
- Bellucia egensis (DC.) Penneys, Michelang., Judd & Almeda
- Bellucia gracilis (S.S.Renner) Penneys, Michelang., Judd & Almeda
- Bellucia grossularioides (L.) Triana
- Bellucia huberi (Wurdack) S.S.Renner
- Bellucia klugii (S.S.Renner) Penneys, Michelang., Judd & Almeda
- Bellucia mespiloides (Miq.) Macbr.
- Bellucia nigricans (Hook.fil.) Penneys, Michelang., Judd & Almeda
- Bellucia ovata (O.Berg ex Triana) Penneys, Michelang., Judd & Almeda
- Bellucia pentamera Naud.
- Bellucia riparia (S.S.Renner) Penneys, Michelang., Judd & Almeda
- Bellucia spruceana (Benth. ex Triana) Macbr.
- Bellucia strigosa (Gleason) Penneys, Michelang., Judd & Almeda
- Bellucia subandina (Wurdack) Penneys, Michelang., Judd & Almeda
- Bellucia subrotundifolia Wurdack
- Bellucia umbellata Gleason
- Bellucia villosa G.Lozano-Contreras & L.M.Quiñones
- Bellucia wurdackiana (S.S.Renner) Penneys, Michelang., Judd & Almeda
