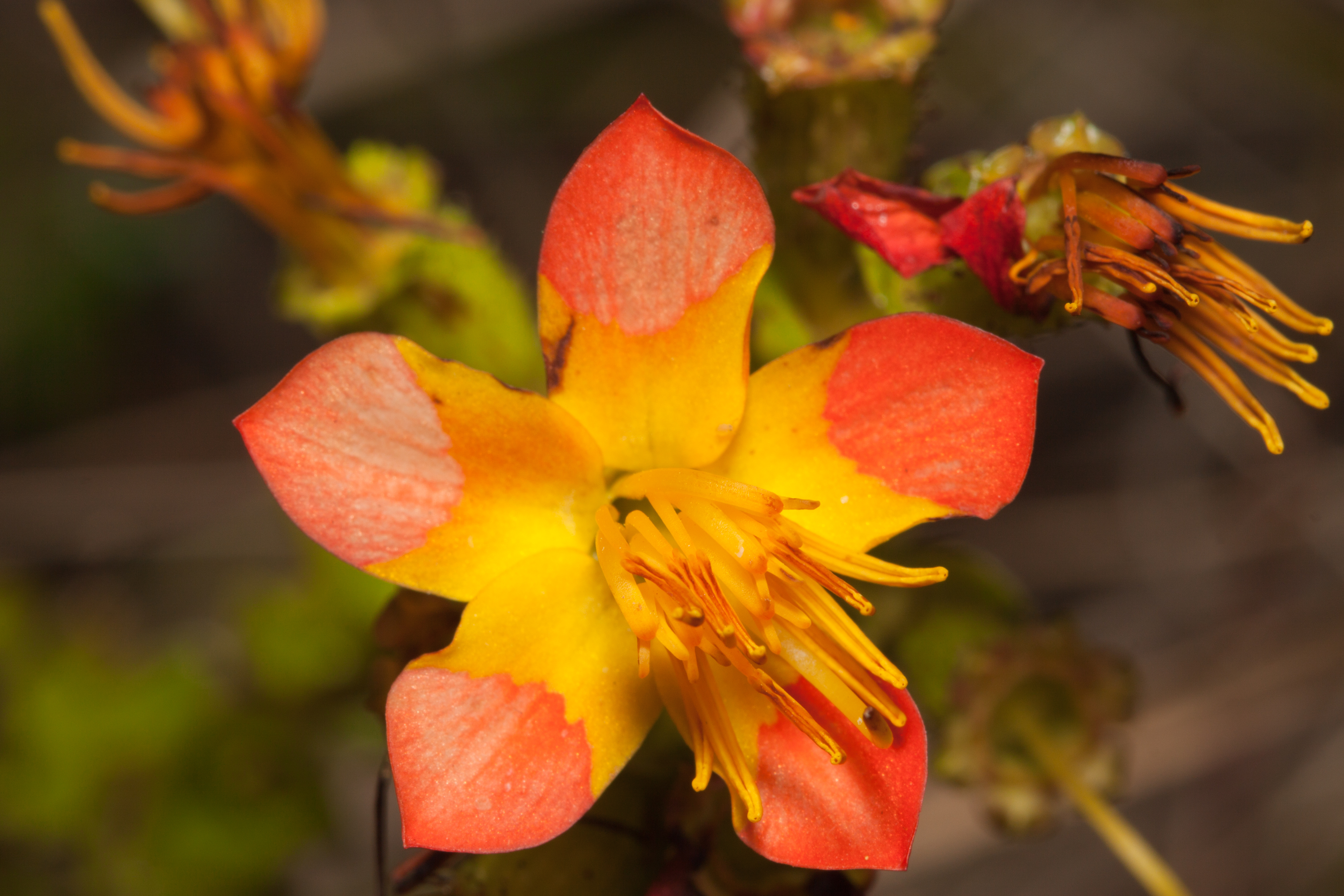

Scientific classification
- Kingdom: Plantae
- Clade: Tracheophytes
- Clade: Angiosperms
- Clade: Eudicots
- Clade: Rosids
- Order: Myrtales
- Family: Melastomataceae
- Genus: Cambessedesia; DC.

= Cambessedesia =

Genus of flowering plants

Cambessedesia is a genus of flowering plants belonging to the family Melastomataceae.

Its native range is Brazil.

Species:

- Cambessedesia angelana Fidanza & Almeda
- Cambessedesia atropurpurea A.B.Martins
- Cambessedesia cambessedesioides (Wurdack) A.B.Martins
- Cambessedesia corymbosa DC.
- Cambessedesia eichleri Cogn.
- Cambessedesia espora DC.
- Cambessedesia glaziovii Cogn. ex A.B.Martins
- Cambessedesia gracilis Wurdack
- Cambessedesia harleyi Wurdack
- Cambessedesia hermogenesii A.B.Martins
- Cambessedesia hilariana DC.
- Cambessedesia latevenosa DC.
- Cambessedesia membranacea Gardner
- Cambessedesia pityrophylla (DC.) A.B.Martins
- Cambessedesia purpurata DC.
- Cambessedesia regnelliana Cogn.
- Cambessedesia rupestris A.B.Martins
- Cambessedesia salviifolia (Cham.) A.B.Martins
- Cambessedesia semidecandra A.St.-Hil. ex A.B.Martins
- Cambessedesia striatella (Naudin) A.B.Martins
- Cambessedesia tenuis Markgr.
- Cambessedesia tiradentensis R.J.V.Alves, R.A.Rutter & A.B.Martins
- Cambessedesia uncinata Fidanza & Almeda
- Cambessedesia weddellii Naudin
- Cambessedesia wurdackii A.B.Martins
