= Spathandra =

Scientific classification
- Kingdom: Plantae
- Clade: Embryophytes
- Clade: Tracheophytes
- Clade: Angiosperms
- Clade: Eudicots
- Clade: Rosids
- Order: Myrtales
- Family: Melastomataceae
- Genus: Spathandra; Guill. & Perr.

Genus of plants

Spathandra is a genus of plant in family Melastomataceae.

Species include:

- Spathandra blakeoides (G.Don) Jacq.-Fél.
