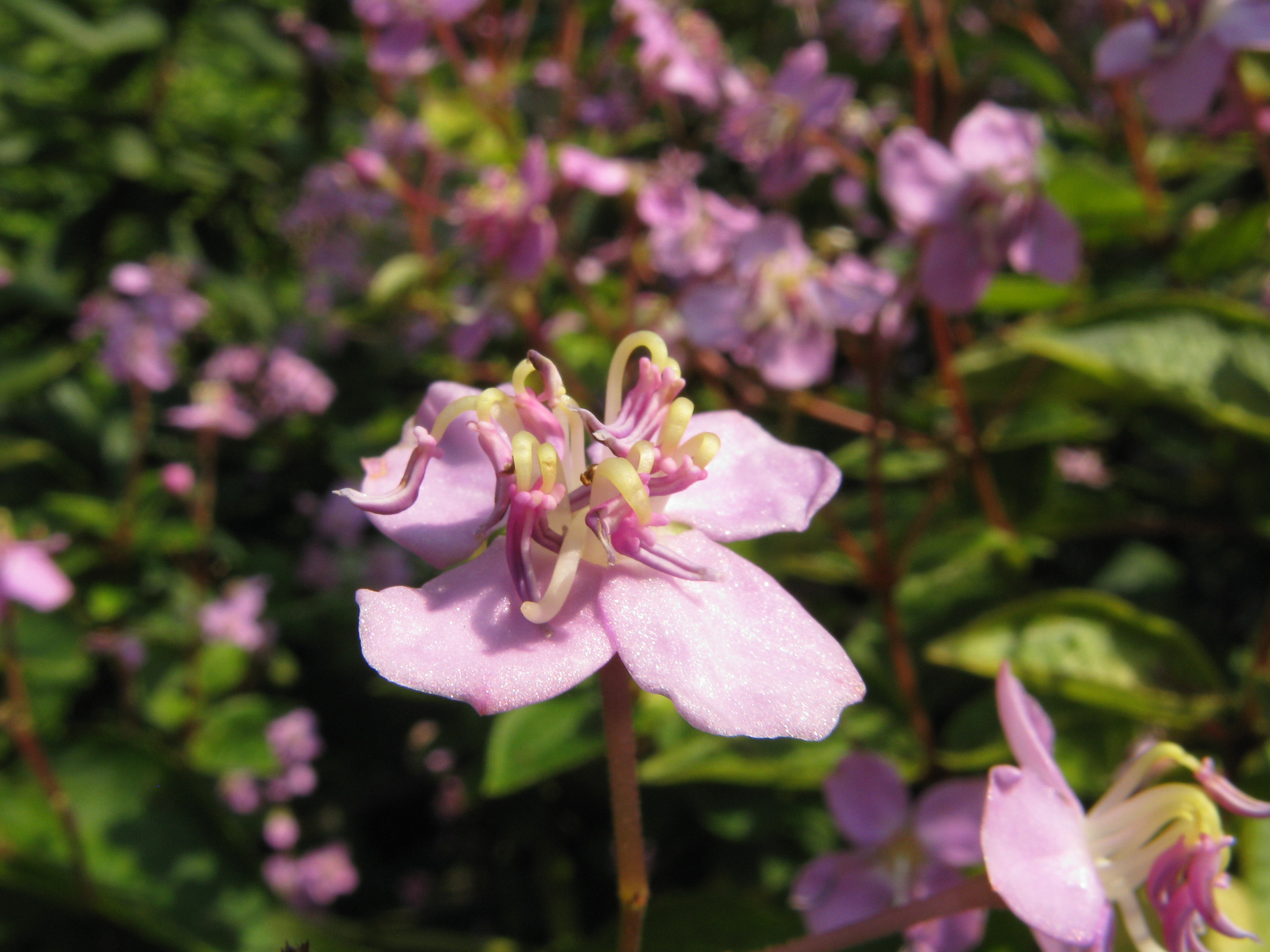
- Bredia hirsuta

Scientific classification
- Kingdom: Plantae
- Clade: Tracheophytes
- Clade: Angiosperms
- Clade: Eudicots
- Clade: Rosids
- Order: Myrtales
- Family: Melastomataceae
- Genus: Bredia; Blume

Species
- See text

= Bredia =

Genus of plants

Bredia is a genus of plants in the family Melastomataceae. Species in this genus are characterized by papery leaf texture and persistent and enlarged ovary crown, enclosing an inverted frustum-shaped depression at capsule top. This genus includes at least 21 species, 15 distributed in mainland China, one in north Vietnam, five in Taiwan and one extending to the Ryukyu Islands.

Most species prefer habitats in forests or along forest margins, stream banks, and damp places, at altitudes of 100 to 2,500 metres (330 to 8,200 ft). The members of the group are generally herbs, shrublets or herbs, erect, ascending or creeping. Stamens 8, unequal or subequal; filaments filiform; anthers dimorphic or isomorphic, subulate to oblong-linear, gibbose, tuberculate or spurred at base, rarely unappendaged abaxially. Capsule turbinate to cup-shaped, more or less 4-sided, crown persistent and enlarged, enclosing an inverted frustum-shaped depression at capsule apex. Seed numerous, minute, cuneate, densely granulate.

== Species and varieties ==
- Bredia changii W.Y. Zhao, X.H. Zhan & W.B. Liao
- Bredia dulanica C.L. Yeh, S.W. Chung & T.C. Hsu
- Bredia esquirolii (H. Lév.) Lauener
- Bredia fordii (Hance) Diels
- Bredia fordii var. micrantha (C. Chen) R.C.Zhou & Ying Liu
- Bredia gibba Ohwi
- Bredia gracilis (Hand.-Mazz.) Diels
- Bredia guidongensis (K.M. Liu & J. Tian) R.C.Zhou & Ying Liu
- Bredia hirsuta Blume
- Bredia hirsuta var. scandens Ito & Matsum.
- Bredia latisepala (C. Chen) R.C.Zhou & Ying Liu
- Bredia longearistata (C. Chen) R.C.Zhou & Ying Liu
- Bredia longiloba (Hand.-Mazz.) Diels
- Bredia longiradiosa C. Chen ex Govaerts
- Bredia longiradiosa var. pulchella (C. Chen) R.C.Zhou & Ying Liu
- Bredia microphylla H.L. Li
- Bredia oldhamii Hook. f.
- Bredia plagiopetala (C. Chen) R.C.Zhou & Ying Liu
- Bredia repens R.C. Zhou, Q.J. Zhou & Ying Liu
- Bredia rotundifolia Yan Liu & C.H. Ou
- Bredia tuberculata (Guillaumin) Diels
- Bredia violacea H.L. Li
- Bredia velutina Diels
- Bredia yunnanensis (H. Lév.) Diels
