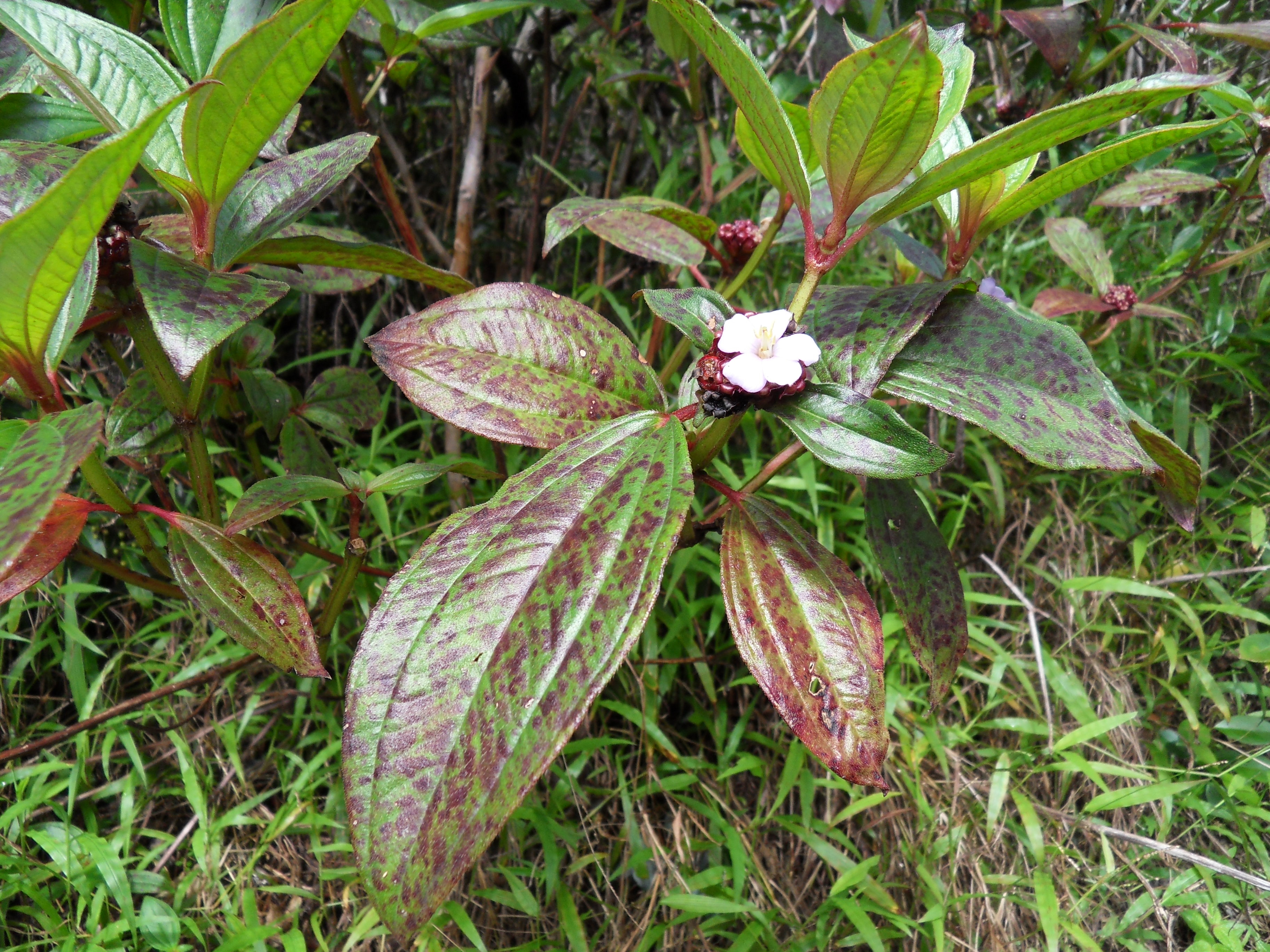
- Tristemma mauritianum in Réunion

Scientific classification
- Kingdom: Plantae
- Clade: Tracheophytes
- Clade: Angiosperms
- Clade: Eudicots
- Clade: Rosids
- Order: Myrtales
- Family: Melastomataceae
- Genus: Tristemma; Juss,

= Tristemma (plant) =

Genus of flowering plants

Tristemma is a genus of flowering plants belonging to the family Melastomataceae.

Its native range is Africa.

Species:

- Tristemma akeassii Jacq.-Fél.
- Tristemma albiflorum Benth.
- Tristemma camerunense Jacq.-Fél.
- Tristemma coronatum Benth.
- Tristemma demeusei De Wild.
- Tristemma hirtum P. Beauv.
- Tristemma involucratum Benth.
- Tristemma leiocalyx Cogn.
- Tristemma littorale Benth.
- Tristemma mauritianum J. F. Gmel.
- Tristemma oreophilum Gilg
- Tristemma oreothamnos Mildbr. ex Mildbr.
- Tristemma rubens A. Fern. & R. Fern.
- Tristemma schliebenii Markgr.
- Tristemma vestitum Jacq.-Fél.
