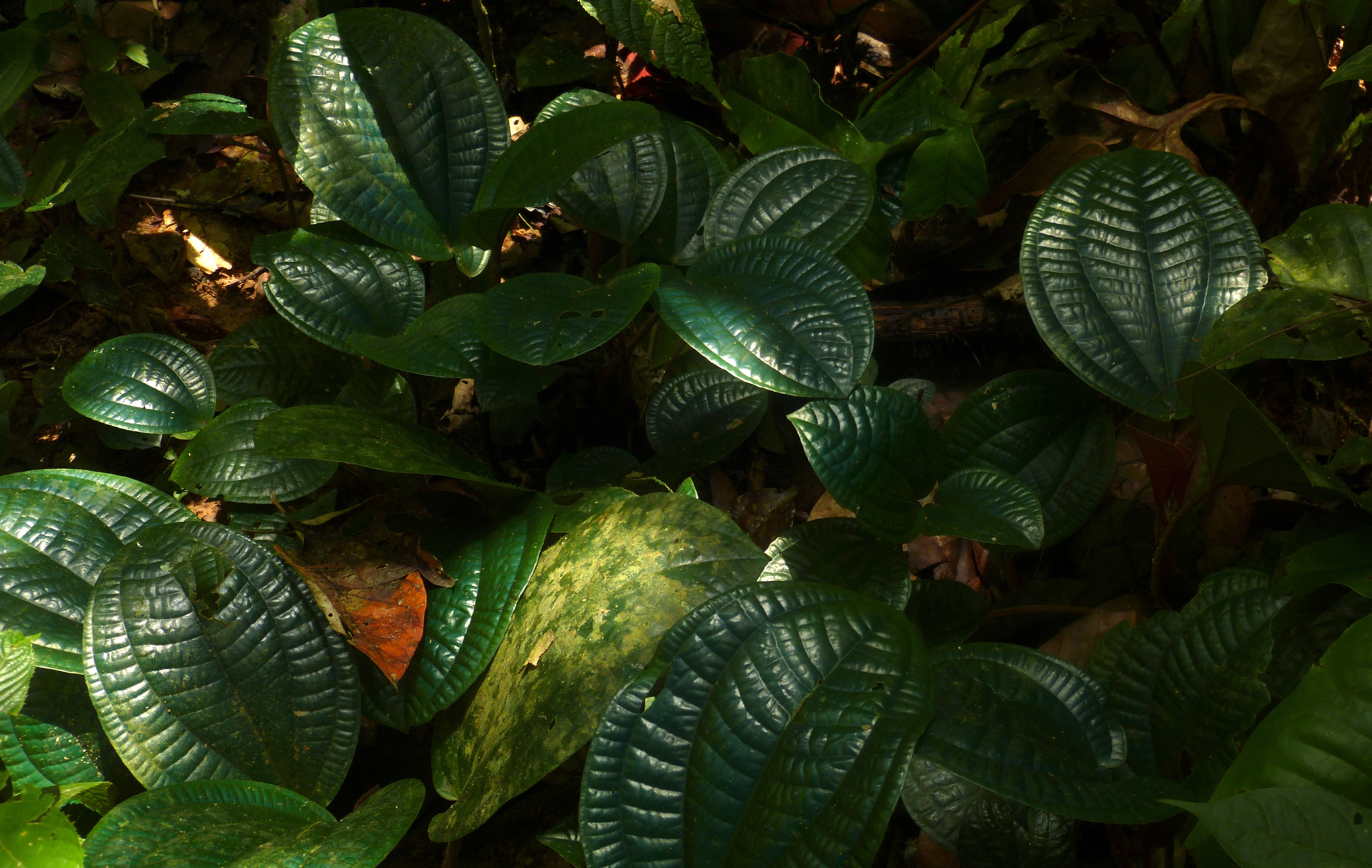
- Phyllagathis rotundifolia

Scientific classification
- Kingdom: Plantae
- Clade: Embryophytes
- Clade: Tracheophytes
- Clade: Angiosperms
- Clade: Eudicots
- Clade: Rosids
- Order: Myrtales
- Family: Melastomataceae
- Subfamily: Melastomatoideae
- Tribe: Sonerileae
- Genus: Phyllagathis; Blume

Species
- See text

Synonyms
- List: Brittenia Cogn.; Cyanandrium Stapf; Enaulophyton Steenis; Stapfiophyton H.L.Li; Tylanthera C.Hansen

= Phyllagathis =

Genus of flowering plants

Phyllagathis is a genus of flowering plants in the family Melastomataceae, native to India, southern China, Southeast Asia, and Malesia. The taxon is believed to be highly polyphyletic.

== Species ==
Currently accepted species include:

- Phyllagathis asarifolia C.Chen
- Phyllagathis atroviolacea C.Hansen ex Cellin.
- Phyllagathis beccariana (Cogn.) M.P.Nayar
- Phyllagathis bicolor C.W.Lin, Chien F.Chen & T.Y.A.Yang
- Phyllagathis brevipedunculata C.Hansen
- Phyllagathis brookei M.P.Nayar
- Phyllagathis cavaleriei Guillaumin
- Phyllagathis cordata Ridl.
- Phyllagathis cymigera C.Chen
- Phyllagathis deltoda C.Chen
- Phyllagathis dichotoma C.Hansen
- Phyllagathis driessenioides C.Hansen
- Phyllagathis elattandra Diels
- Phyllagathis elliptica Stapf
- Phyllagathis erecta (S.Y.Hu) C.Y.Wu ex C.Chen
- Phyllagathis fengii C.Hansen
- Phyllagathis gigantifolia M.P.Nayar
- Phyllagathis gracilis (Hand.-Mazz.) C.Chen
- Phyllagathis griffithii King
- Phyllagathis guillauminii H.L.Li
- Phyllagathis guttata (Stapf) Cellin.
- Phyllagathis gymnantha Korth.
- Phyllagathis hainanensis (Merr. & Chun) C.Chen
- Phyllagathis hispida King
- Phyllagathis hispidissima (C.Chen) C.Chen
- Phyllagathis indica J.Mathew, Yohannan & Kad.V.George
- Phyllagathis jacobsiana (M.P.Nayar) Cellin.
- Phyllagathis lii C.W.Lin, Chien F.Chen & T.Y.A.Yang
- Phyllagathis longicalcarata C.Hansen
- Phyllagathis longifolius (Cogn.) J.F.Maxwell
- Phyllagathis longispicatus (Cogn.) J.F.Maxwell
- Phyllagathis marumiaetricha (Guillaumin) C.Hansen
- Phyllagathis maxwellii B.C.Stone & A.Weber
- Phyllagathis megalocentra C.Hansen
- Phyllagathis melastomatoides (Merr. & Chun) W.C.Ko
- Phyllagathis millelunata C.W.Lin, Chien F.Chen & T.Y.A.Yang
- Phyllagathis nanakorniana Wangwasit, Norsaengsri & Cellin.
- Phyllagathis osmantha (M.P.Nayar) Cellin.
- Phyllagathis ovalifolia H.L.Li
- Phyllagathis peltata Stapf ex Ridl.
- Phyllagathis penrissenensis Cellin.
- Phyllagathis phamhoangii V.T.Pham, V.T.Chinh & Ranil
- Phyllagathis phyllioides C.W.Lin, Chien F.Chen & T.Y.A.Yang
- Phyllagathis prostrata C.Hansen
- Phyllagathis pulcherrima M.P.Nayar
- Phyllagathis rajah C.W.Lin, Chien F.Chen & T.Y.A.Yang
- Phyllagathis rivularis C.W.Lin, Chien F.Chen & T.Y.A.Yang
- Phyllagathis rotundifolia (Jack) Blume
- Phyllagathis rubrosetosa C.W.Lin, Chien F.Chen & T.Y.A.Yang
- Phyllagathis rufa (Stapf) Cellin.
- Phyllagathis scorpiothyrsoides C.Chen
- Phyllagathis scortechinii King
- Phyllagathis sessilifolia C.Hansen
- Phyllagathis setotheca H.L.Li
- Phyllagathis siamensis Cellin. & S.S.Renner
- Phyllagathis steenisii Cellin.
- Phyllagathis stellata C.W.Lin & C.H.Lee
- Phyllagathis stenophylla (Merr. & Chun) H.L.Li
- Phyllagathis stolonifera Kiew
- Phyllagathis subacaulis (Cogn.) Cellin.
- Phyllagathis suberalata C.Hansen
- Phyllagathis subrotunda C.Hansen
- Phyllagathis tentaculifera C.Hansen
- Phyllagathis ternata C.Chen
- Phyllagathis tetrandra Diels
- Phyllagathis tonkinensis Stapf
- Phyllagathis truncata C.Hansen
- Phyllagathis tuberculata King
- Phyllagathis tuberosa (C.Hansen) Cellin. & S.S.Renner
- Phyllagathis ulu C.W.Lin, Chien F.Chen & T.Y.A.Yang
- Phyllagathis velutina (Diels) C.Chen
- Phyllagathis violinifolia C.W.Lin, Chien F.Chen & T.Y.A.Yang
- Phyllagathis wallacei C.W.Lin, Chien F.Chen & T.Y.A.Yang
- Phyllagathis yodae C.W.Lin, Chien F.Chen & T.Y.A.Yang
