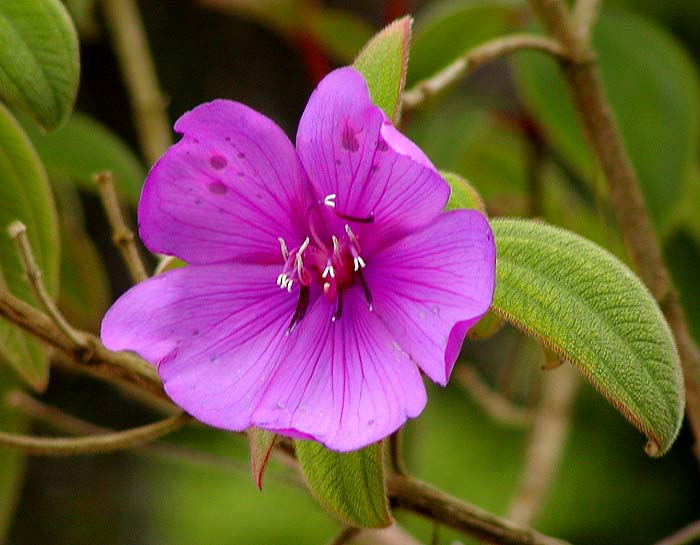
- Pleroma semidecandrum, syn. Tibouchina semidecandra, at Strybing Arboretum, San Francisco

Scientific classification
- Kingdom: Plantae
- Clade: Embryophytes
- Clade: Tracheophytes
- Clade: Spermatophytes
- Clade: Angiosperms
- Clade: Eudicots
- Clade: Rosids
- Order: Myrtales
- Family: Melastomataceae; Juss.

Type genus
- Melastoma L.

Genera
- See text.

= Melastomataceae =

Melastomataceae Temporal range: Turonian - recent

Family of flowering plants

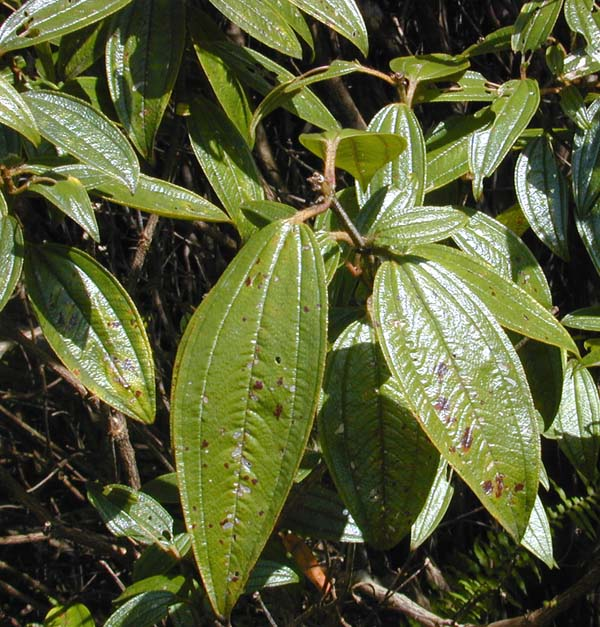
Characteristic venation of many melastomes

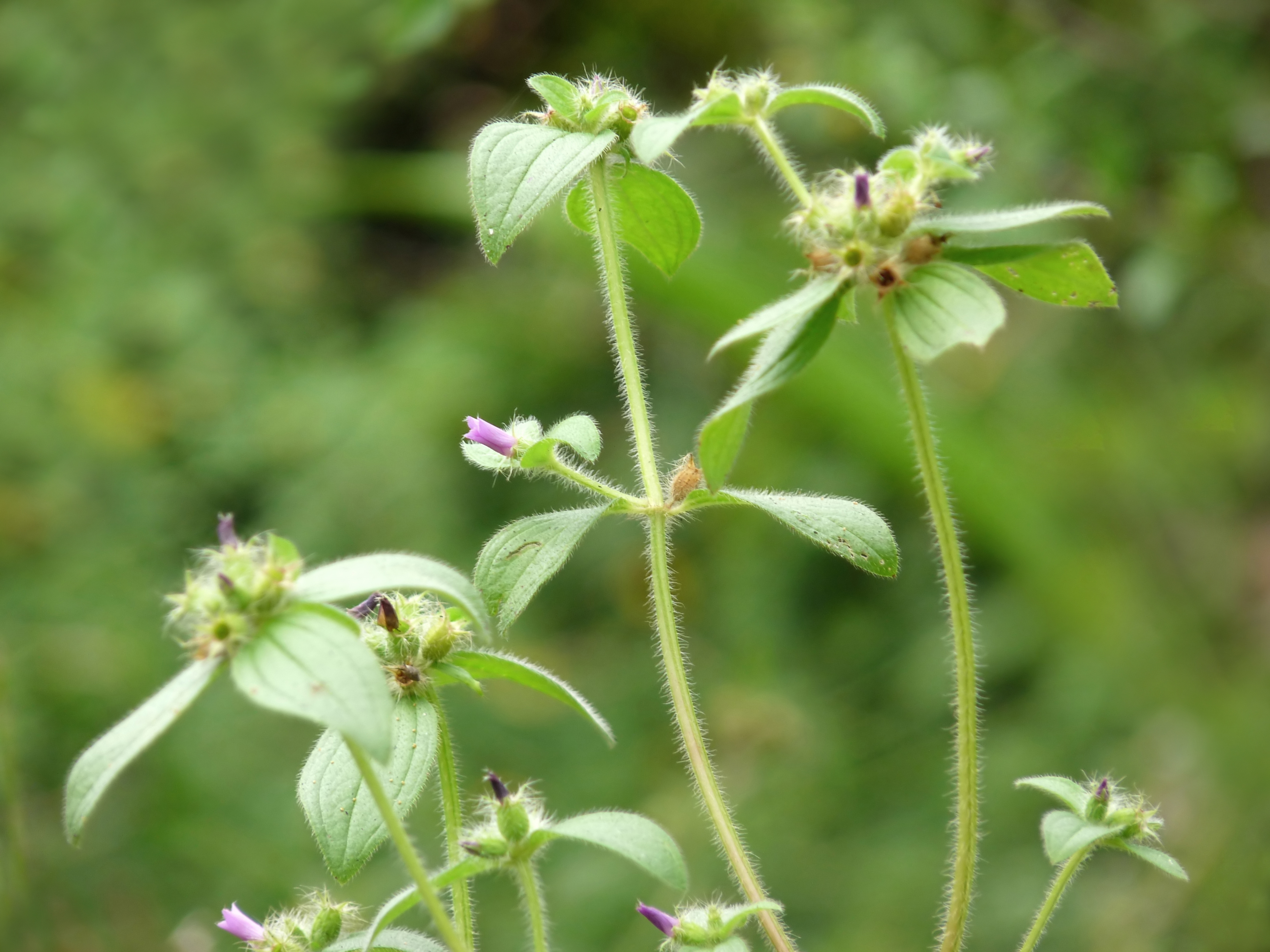
Osbeckia muralis in Kerala

Melastomataceae (/mɛləstoʊmɑːˈteɪsiˌaɪ, -siːˌiː/) is a family of dicotyledonous flowering plants found mostly in the tropics (two-thirds of the genera are from the New World tropics) comprising c. 175 genera and c. 5115 known species. Melastomes are annual or perennial herbs, shrubs, or small trees.

== Description ==
The leaves of melastomes are somewhat distinctive, being opposite, decussate, and usually with 3-7 longitudinal veins arising either from the base of the blade, plinerved (inner veins diverging above base of blade), or pinnately nerved with three or more pairs of primary veins diverging from the mid-vein at successive points above the base.

Flowers are perfect, and borne either singly or in terminal or axillary, paniculate cymes.

== Ecology ==
A number of melastomes are regarded as invasive species once naturalized in tropical and subtropical environments outside their normal range. Examples are Koster's curse (Clidemia hirta), Pleroma semidecandrum and Miconia calvescens, but many other species are involved.

== Taxonomy ==
Under the APG III system of classification, the seven genera from Memecylaceae are now included in this family.

== Genera ==
There are some 169 accepted genera in the Melastomataceae family as of July 2025. They are:

- Acanthella Hook.f.
- Aciotis D.Don
- Acisanthera P.Browne
- Adelobotrys DC.
- Allomaieta Gleason
- Alloneuron Pilg.
- Almedanthus Ver.-Lib. & R.D.Stone
- Amphiblemma Naudin
- Amphorocalyx Baker
- Anaheterotis Ver.-Lib. & G.Kadereit
- Andesanthus P.J.F.Guim. & Michelang.
- Anerincleistus Korth.
- Antherotoma (Naudin) Hook.f.
- Appendicularia DC.
- Argyrella Naudin
- Arthrostemma Pav. ex D.Don
- Aschistanthera C.Hansen
- Astrocalyx Merr.
- Astronia Blume
- Astronidium A.Gray
- Axinaea Ruiz & Pav.
- Bamlera K.Schum. & Lauterb.
- Barthea Hook.f.
- Beccarianthus Cogn.
- Bellucia Neck. ex Raf.
- Benna Burgt & Ver.-Lib.
- Bertolonia Raddi
- Bisglaziovia Cogn.
- Blakea P.Browne
- Blastus Lour.
- Boerlagea Cogn.
- Bourdaria A.Chev.
- Boyania Wurdack
- Brachyotum (DC.) Triana
- Brasilianthus Almeda & Michelang.
- Bredia Blume
- Bucquetia DC.
- Cailliella Jacq.-Fél.
- Calvoa Hook.f.
- Cambessedesia DC.
- Castratella Naudin
- Catanthera F.Muell.
- Centradenia G.Don
- Centradeniastrum Cogn.
- Centronia D.Don
- Chaetogastra DC.
- Chaetolepis (DC.) Miq.
- Chalybea Naudin
- Cincinnobotrys Gilg
- Comolia DC.
- Comoliopsis Wurdack
- Creochiton Blume
- Cyphotheca Diels
- Dalenia Korth.
- Derosiphia Raf.
- Desmoscelis Naudin
- Dicellandra Hook.f.
- Dichaetanthera Endl.
- Dinophora Benth.
- Dionycha Naudin
- Dionychastrum A.Fern. & R.Fern.
- Diplectria (Blume) Rchb.
- Dissochaeta Blume
- Dissotidendron (A.Fern. & R.Fern.) Ver.-Lib. & G.Kadereit
- Dissotis Benth.
- Driessenia Korth.
- Dupineta Raf.
- Eleotis Ver.-Lib. & R.D.Stone
- Eriocnema Naudin
- Ernestia Naudin
- Feliciadamia Bullock
- Feliciotis Ver.-Lib. & G.Kadereit
- Fordiophyton Stapf
- Fritzschia Cham.
- Graffenrieda DC.
- Gravesia Naudin
- Guyonia Naudin
- Henriettea DC.
- Heteroblemma (Blume) Cámara-Leret, Ridd.-Num. & Veldkamp
- Heterocentron Hook. & Arn.
- Heterotis Benth.
- Huberia DC.
- Kendrickia Hook.f.
- Kerriothyrsus C.Hansen
- Kirkbridea Wurdack
- Lijndenia Zoll. & Moritzi
- Lithobium Bong.
- Loricalepis Brade
- Macairea DC.
- Macrocentrum Hook.f.
- Macrolenes Naudin
- Maguireanthus Wurdack
- Mallophyton Wurdack
- Marcetia DC.
- Medinilla Gaudich. ex DC.
- Melastoma L.
- †Melastomites
- Melastomastrum Naudin
- Memecylon L.
- Mendelia Ver.-Lib. & G.Kadereit
- Meriania Sw.
- Merianthera Kuhlm.
- Miconia D.Don
- Microlicia D.Don
- Monochaetum (DC.) Naudin
- Monolena Triana ex Benth. & Hook.f.
- Mouriri Aubl.
- Neblinanthera Wurdack
- Neodriessenia M.P.Nayar
- Nephoanthus C.W.Lin & T.C.Hsu
- Nepsera Naudin
- Nerophila Naudin
- Noterophila Mart.
- Nothodissotis Ver.-Lib. & G.Kadereit
- Ochthephilus Wurdack
- Ochthocharis Blume
- Opisthocentra Hook.f.
- Osbeckia L.
- Ossaea DC.
- Oxyspora DC.
- Pachycentria Blume
- Pachyloma DC.
- Perilimnastes Ridl.
- Phainantha Gleason
- Phyllagathis Blume
- Physeterostemon R.Goldenb. & Amorim
- Pilocosta Almeda & Whiffin
- Plagiopetalum Rehder
- Pleroma D.Don
- Plethiandra Hook.f.
- Poikilogyne Baker f.
- Poilannammia C.Hansen
- Poteranthera Bong.
- Preussiella Gilg
- Pseudodissochaeta Nayar
- Pseudoernestia Krasser
- Pternandra Jack
- Pterogastra Naudin
- Pterolepis (DC.) Miq.
- Pyrotis Ver.-Lib. & R.D.Stone
- Quipuanthus Michelang. & C.Ulloa
- Rhexia Gronov.
- Rhynchanthera DC.
- Rosettea Ver.-Lib. & G.Kadereit
- Rostranthera M.J.Rocha & P.J.F.Guim.
- Rousseauxia DC.
- Salpinga Mart. ex DC.
- Sandemania Gleason
- Sarcopyramis Wall.
- Schwackaea Cogn.
- Scorpiothyrsus H.L.Li
- Siphanthera Pohl
- Sonerila Roxb.
- Spathandra Guill. & Perr.
- Sporoxeia W.W.Sm.
- Stanmarkia Almeda
- Stussenia C.Hansen
- Styrophyton S.Y.Yu
- Tashiroea Matsum. ex T.Itô & Matsum.
- Tateanthus Gleason
- Tessmannianthus Markgr.
- Tibouchina Aubl.
- Tigridiopalma C.Chen
- Triolena Naudin
- Tristemma Juss.
- Tryssophyton Wurdack
- Vietsenia C.Hansen
- Votomita Aubl.
- Warneckea Gilg
- Wurdastom B.Walln.

== Foraging ==
Melastomataceae is foraged by many stingless bees, especially by the species Melipona bicolor which gather pollen from this taxon of flowering plant.
