= Noterophila =

Scientific classification
- Kingdom: Plantae
- Clade: Tracheophytes
- Clade: Angiosperms
- Clade: Eudicots
- Clade: Rosids
- Order: Myrtales
- Family: Melastomataceae
- Genus: Noterophila; Mart. (1831)

Species
- 8; see text

Synonyms
- Exodiclis Raf. (1838); Iaravaea Scop. (1777), not validly publ.; Miocarpus Naudin (1844); Onoctonia Naudin (1849)

Genus of plants

Noterophila is a genus of flowering plants in family Melastomataceae. It includes eight species native to the tropical Americas, ranging from southern Mexico and Cuba to Bolivia and southeastern Brazil.

- Noterophila bivalvis (Aubl.) Kriebel & M.J.Rocha
- Noterophila crassipes (Naudin) Kriebel & M.J.Rocha
- Noterophila genliseoides (Hoehne) Kriebel & M.J.Rocha
- Noterophila inundata (DC.) Mart.
- Noterophila limnobios (DC.) Mart.
- Noterophila nana (Ule) Kriebel & M.J.Rocha
- Noterophila rosulans (Huber) Kriebel & M.J.Rocha
- Noterophila tetramera Naudin
