= Memecylon plebejum =

Conservation status
- Least Concern (IUCN 3.1)

Scientific classification
- Kingdom: Plantae
- Clade: Embryophytes
- Clade: Tracheophytes
- Clade: Angiosperms
- Clade: Eudicots
- Clade: Rosids
- Order: Myrtales
- Family: Melastomataceae
- Genus: Memecylon
- Species: M. plebejum

Binomial name
- Memecylon plebejum Kurz

Synonyms
- Memecylon plebejum var. ellipsoideum Craib; Memecylon plebejum var. siamense Craib; Memecylon plebejum var. silhetense C.B.Clarke; Memecylon plebejum var. symplocinum Craib

Species of tree native to Asia

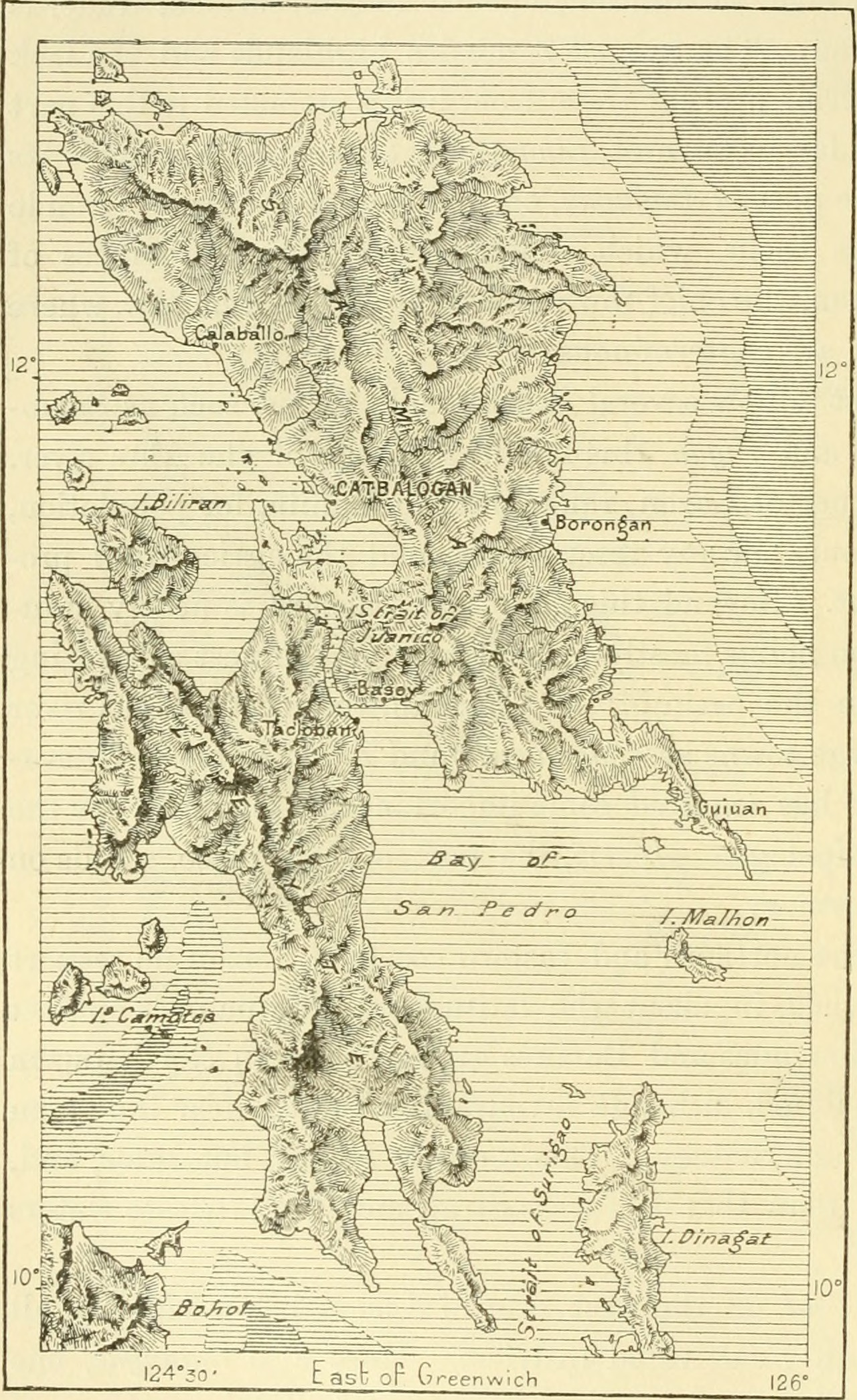
Samae San Island, Thailand, 1890 map

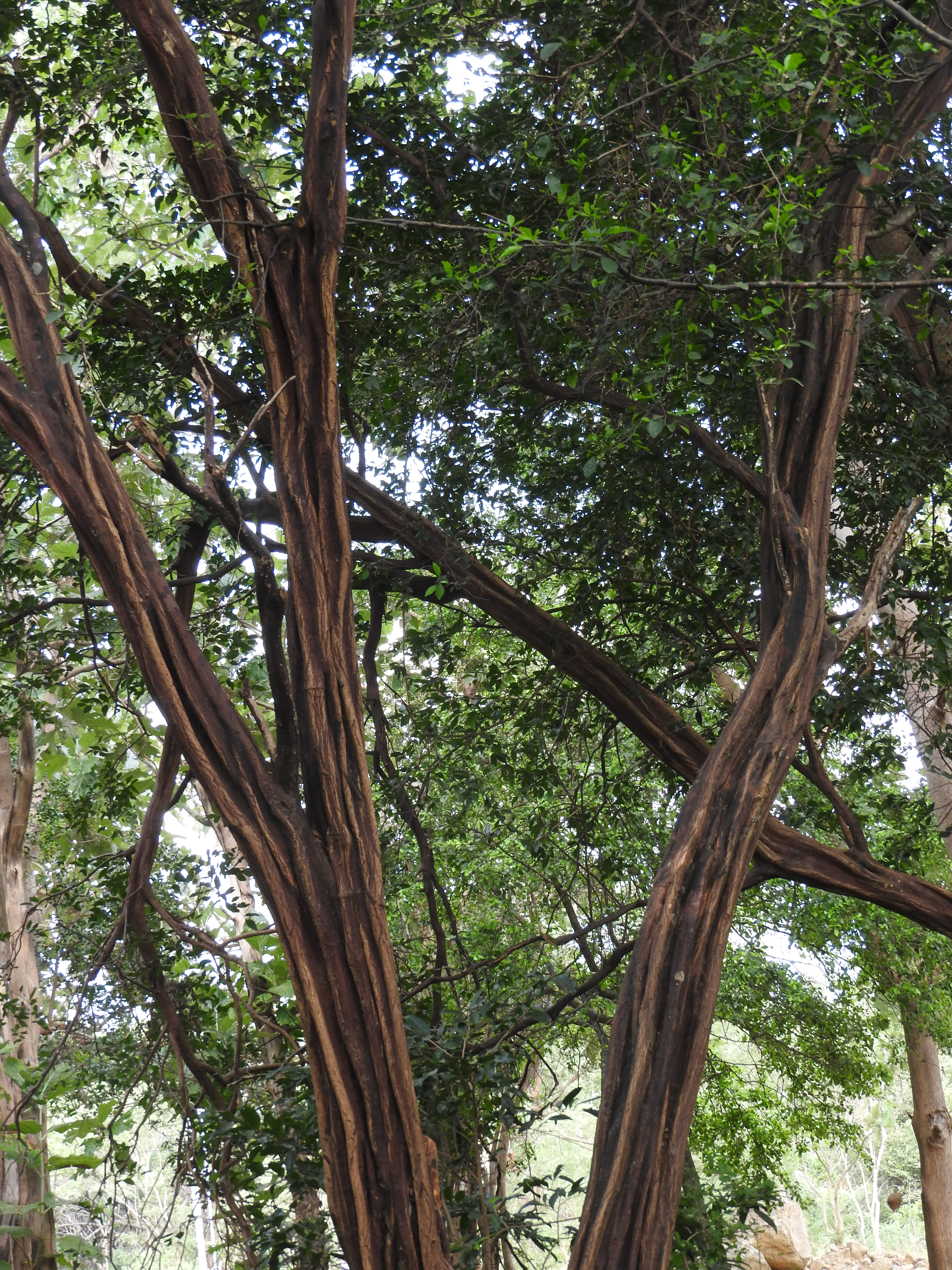
Atalantia monophylla tree

Memecylon plebejum is a tree or shrub species in the Melastomataceae family. It grows in tropical Asia from Thailand to Myanmar, Assam (India) and Bangladesh. It favours slopes of hills and mountains, growing up to 1685m elevation, in the understorey of primary forests primarily. It hosts at least one fruit-fly and two parasitoid wasps. The wood is very hard to cut, making it difficult to use as firewood, but some people use it for agricultural tool handles.

== Description ==
An evergreen tree or shrub that grows some 4.5 to 10 m (15 to 33 ft) tall. Seed germination times are 16 to 44 days in both partial and deep shade.

== Taxonomy ==
This species has been identified by molecular phylogenetics using nuclear ribosomal DNA as being in a Malesian/Southeast Asian/Chinese clade with Memecylon caeruleum, Memecylon cantleyi, Memecylon lilacinum, Memecylon pauciflorum and Memecylon scutellatum.

== Distribution ==
The taxa is native to an area in tropical Asia, from Thailand to Assam in India. Countries and regions in which it grows are: Thailand; Myanmar; India (Assam); and Bangladesh.

== Habitat and ecology ==
On small Samae San Island, Chonburi Province, Thailand, there are three vegetation communities characterized by this tree. In the Memecylon plebejum with Atalantia monophylla community the most important trees are M. plebejum, Vitex limonifolia and Diospyros filipendula out of 23 tree species, it is distributed on medium or less slopes at low altitudes (<60m) with high soil moisture. In the Memecylon plebejum community I there are some 17 tree species, with the three most important being M. plebejum, D. filipendula and V. limonifolia, this community is mostly distributed on medium slopes and altitude (<100m). The Memecylon plebejum community II has 20 tree species with M. plebejum, V. limonifolia and D. filipendula the most important, it is found on upland slopes (>100m) to top of the mountains (max. 167m) with steep slopes and high sand percentage in soil. Biomass is given in the following table.

Above ground biomass for vegetation communities dominated by M. plebejum on Samae San Island, Thailand (after Pumijumnong and Payomrat 2013)
Vegetation	Absolute Density (tree m^{−2})	Stem kg/tree	Branch kg/tree	Leaf kg/tree	Root kg/tree	Total kg/tree	Biomass content (kg m^{−2})
M. plebejum with A. monophylla	0.33	16.77	4.61	0.79	4.46	26.62	8.67
M. plebejum I	0.36	9.51	2.36	0.61	2.99	15.46	5.53
M. plebejum II	0.36	11.16	2.84	0.66	3.36	18.02	6.45

The community on the medium slopes {MpI} and altitude have more but slighter trees, the community on medium slopes and low altitude (MpwAm) have the less frequent but more sturdy, branchier, leafier and more rooted trees.

On the border of Namtok Phlio National Park, Chanthaburi Province, Thailand, the tree is found in gallery forest of lower tropical rainforest at Ban Thaew Khlong.

In primary forests of Umphang Wildlife Sanctuary, Tak Province, northwestern Thailand, the species Syzygium cumini, Nephelium hypoleucum, Walsura trichostemon, and Anacolosa ilicoides dominate, with M. plebejum as a minor component.

The species grows as one of the common evergreen trees up to 10m in the sub-understorey of the evergreen and pine forest of Doi Khun Tan National Park, in Lamphun and Lampang Provinces, northern Thailand. This community grows from 1,000 to 1,350 m (3,280 to 4,430 ft) above sea level, and the canopy is dominated by Pinus kesiya and a very diverse group of deciduous and evergreen trees: Hovenia dulcis (up to 40m tall), Acrocarpus fraxinifolius, Pterocymbium dongnaiense, Melia azedarach, Toona hexandra, Erythrina stricta, Balakata baccata, Michelia champaca, Magnolia baillonii, Actinodaphne henryi, Betula alnoides, Artocarpus species, Ficus altissima, Castanopsis calathiformis, Castanopsis diversifolia, Lithocarpus elegans, Lithocarpus fenestratus and Quercus gomeziana. Other common sub-understorey trees include Baccaurea ramiflora and Dalrympelea pomifera.

The slopes of Doi Suthep, now part of Doi Suthep–Pui National Park, Chiang Mai Province, northern Thailand, has been characterized as having some 11 vegetation communities. Five of the communities include this species as a component, see following table:

Vegetation communities ("phytocenoses") of Doi Suthep, Chiang Mai Province, Thailand (after Sawyer and Chermsirivathana 1969)
No.	Location	Community	Dominants	Occurrence of M. plebejum
3	Lower mountain slopes (350-1100m)	tall and medium tall angiosperm deciduous trees with some bamboo	Dipterocarpus obtusifolius, Pentacme suavis, Terminalia corticosa	moderate
5	Lower mountain slopes (350-1100m)	tall and medium tall to low angiosperm deciduous trees and shrubs with little or no bamboo	Craibiodendron stellatum, Dipterocarpus obtusifolius, Shorea obtusa	moderate
7	Higher mountain slopes (600-1685m)	tall angiosperm evergreen trees with large crowns	Castanopsis acuminatissima, Dipterocarpus costatus, Phoebe lanceolata	moderate
8	Higher mountain slopes (600-1685m)	medium tall angiosperm evergreen and deciduous trees and shrubs and gymnosperm trees with open ground cover of grasses	Lithocarpus lindleyanus, Pinus latteri, Shorea obtusa	moderate
11	Higher mountain slopes (600-1685m)	tall and medium tall angiosperm evergreen trees	Castanopsis acuminatissima, Nyssa javanica, Schima wallichii	infrequent

It grows in the tropical mountain cloud forest (1280-1420masl) in the Kog-ma watershed on the slopes of Doi Pui, in Chiang Mai Province, north Thailand. The tree grows to about 4.5 m (15 ft) tall, with first branches at 2.5 m (8 ft 2 in) and some 1.1 diameter at breast height. The community is dominated by Lithocarpus, Quercus and Castanopsis species.

The species is part of the regrowth forests that grow after swidden farming has ceased in Chiang Mai Province, northern Thailand. It is one of the few trees of the forest that are not suitable for firewood, as the wood is too hard to cut.

M. plebejum grows as a shrub in dry dipterocarp forest that has been "enriched" with Pinus kesiya planting, within the Huai Hong Khrai Royal Development Study Center, Doi Saket District, Chiang Mai Province. The forest is dominated by the pine, and the following diptercarps: Shorea obtusa, Dipterocarpus tuberculatus, and Dipterocarpus obtusifolius.

This taxa is one of the species that grow in the old growth Ru Linh forest of Vĩnh Linh District, Quảng Trị Province, central Vietnam.

The plant is a host in Thailand and Malaysia to the fruit fly Bactrocera osbeckiae and the parasitoid wasps Diachasmimorpha longicaudata and Fopius vandenboschi. The wasps are potentially a biological control for the fruit fly on economic crops.

== Vernacular names ==
- sầm (generic name for Memecylon trees, Vietnamese language)

== Uses ==
Hmong people living in Doi Pui village, Doi Suthep–Pui National Park, Chiang Mai Province, northern Thailand, use the wood of the tree to make agricultural tools.

== History ==
The species was first named in 1875 by the German-born botanist Wilhelm Sulpiz Kurz (1834–1878), who was director at the then Buitenzorg Botanical Gardens, now Bogor, from 1859 to 1864, and also worked in Sulawesi, Kolkata, Andaman Islands, Myanmar and Malaysia. He described the taxa in his publication Preliminary Report on the Forest and other Vegetation of Pegu.
