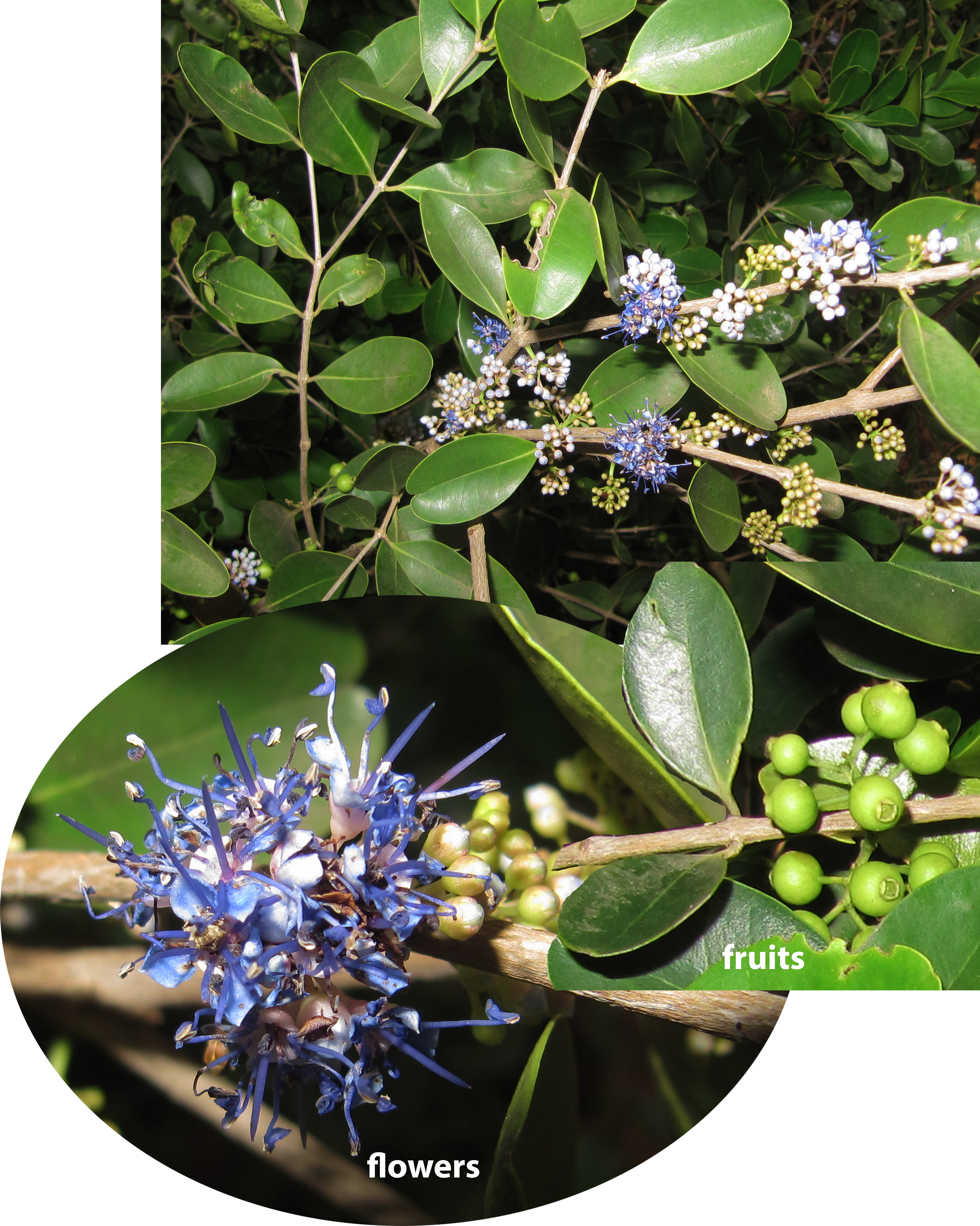
- Memecylon umbellatum From Mirijjawila Botanical Garden, Sri Lanka

Scientific classification
- Kingdom: Plantae
- Clade: Tracheophytes
- Clade: Angiosperms
- Clade: Eudicots
- Clade: Rosids
- Order: Myrtales
- Family: Melastomataceae
- Genus: Memecylon; L.

= Memecylon =

Genus of flowering plants

Memecylon is a plant group in Melastomataceae. It consists of 350-400 species of small to medium-sized trees and shrubs occurring in the Old World tropics. Memecylon is a monophyletic group basal to the Melastomataceae clade. Memecylon taxa have more than 600 published basionyms. Diversity of this group is concentrated in tropical Africa, Madagascar, Sri Lanka, India and Malaysia.

== Etymology ==
The name Memecylon is derived from 'memaecylon' as used by ancient Greek philosophers Dioscorides and Pliny to describe the red fruits of Arbutus unedo (oriental strawberry tree), an unrelated plant group, alluding to the pink to reddish berries often produced by Memecylon. Some vernacular names in different regions of the world are given below. English: "Blue mist plant", Hindi: Anjan; Malayalam: Aattukanala [ആറ്റുകനല], Kaasaavu: [കാശാവ്], Kaayaampoo: [കായാമ്പൂ]; Odia: Neymaru; Olle Kudi, Alimar (ಒಳ್ಳೆ ಕುಡಿ, ಅಳಿಮರ) in Kannada; Sinhala: Korakaha, Welikaha; Tamil: Kaya.

== Morphology ==
Memecylon sensu lato can be diagnosed by exstipulate leaves, four-merous bisexual flowers, anthers opening by slits, enlarged connectives bearing terpenoid secreting glands and berries. Memecylon sensu stricto can be distinguished from other Memecyloids by obscure nervation on leaves, non-glandular roughened leaf surface having branched sclerids, imbricate calyx, unilocular ovary and large embryo with thick and convoluted cotyledons.

=== Stems ===
Species of larger stature have a characteristic brown bark with narrow and sharp furrows, most are small single stemmed trees. However, the bark of many species of smaller stature is varied and may be papery white or smooth dark red-black.

=== Leaves ===
Leaves are opposite, short-stalked, elliptic or ovate, mostly with widely spaced pinnate nerves either visible or obscure. Leaves along the twig are all the same size, shiny, glabrous, with entire margins, the node has a characteristic scar between the leaves, the twig bark is typically red, striated and flaky.

=== Flowers ===
The inflorescence is typically dense and axillary. The florets are small (usually less than 5 mm) compared to the other taxa in Melastomataceae, with short fleshy corolla parts. Cymes are bracteate, usually thyrsoid to umbel shaped, often condensed to sessile fascicles of flowers or a few-flowered heads at tips of peduncles. The florets are white or violet, the stamens blue or violet, usually obvious in aggregates, from axillary clusters. Flowers are bisexual, have inferior ovaries, but the parts are otherwise free. The calyx is valvate and there are twice as many stamens as petals.

=== Fruits ===
The fruit is from an inferior ovary, typically axillary. The calyx remnants are persistent, and are sometimes blue-black. Fruits are globose or occasionally ellipsoid, pulpy or juicy with one large seed.

== Distribution ==
This group is distributed in approximately 53 countries of the Old World tropics and occupies a wide range of habitats. Memecylon taxa have been reported from montane forests, tropical lowland forests, grasslands, tropical rainforests with low to high rainfall, rocky mountain regions and regions with low to high temperature and a considerable overlap between ranges of different taxa. Most of the plants in this group are regionally or locally endemic. Endemic Memecylon are reported from 21 countries. The global distribution of this group is shown in the following Figure and some of the countries which have endemic Memecylon species are listed in the table.

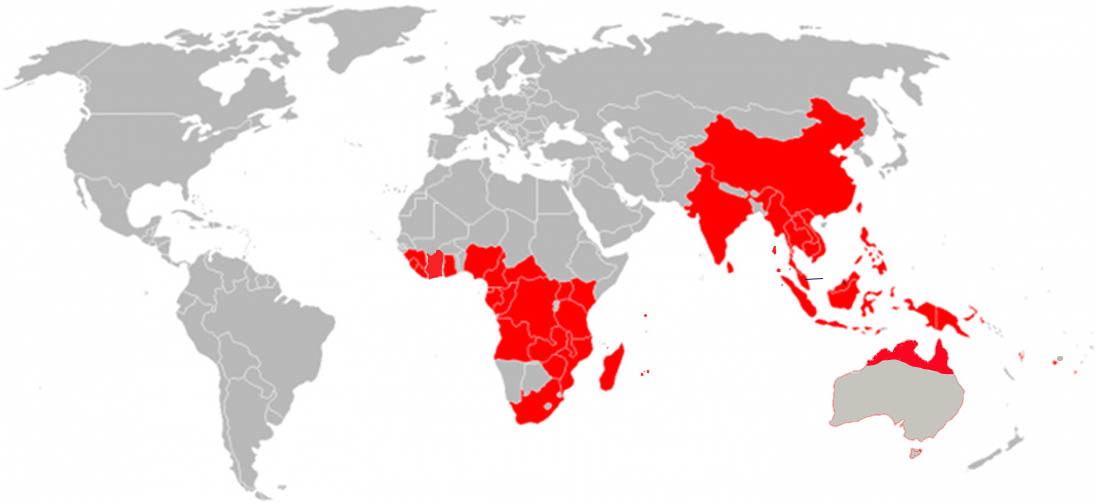
Global distribution of Memecylon. Regions in red include presence data of Memecylon. Sources: GBIF geographic occurrence data and locality data in NCBI database

Table1. Number of Memecylon taxa reported from different countries

Country	Total Number of Memecylon
Andamans	9
Angola	4
Australia	3
Borneo	18
Cambodia	10
Cameroon	27
Ceram Island	3
Central African Republic	2
China	16
Congo	10
Democratic Republic of Congo	1
Equatorial Guinea	7
Fiji	3
Gabon	24
Ghana	4
Guinea	6
India	39
Indonesia	14
Ivory Coast	6
Java	9
Kenya	6
Laos	7
Liberia	9
Madagascar	138
Malawi	2
Malaysia	29
Mascarene Islands	4
Mauritius	5
Mayotte	1
Mozambique	3
Myanmar	12
New Guinea	14
Nicobar Islands	2
Nigeria	5
Philippines	16
Papua New Guinea	9
Reunion	2
Seychelle	2
Sierra Leone	4
Simalue Island	2
Singapore	12
South Africa	2
Sri Lanka	32
Sumatra	10
Taiwan	2
Tanzania	10
Thailand	21
Tonga	1
Uganda	1
Vanuatu	1
Vietnam	15
Zambia	2
Zimbabwe	1

== Phylogeny ==
=== Phylogeny based on morphological treatments ===
The classification of Memecylon has switched back and forth among families Melastomataceae, Myrtaceae and Memecylaceae based on morphological, anatomical and molecular evidence. Early classifications excluded Memecylon and Mouriri from the Melastomataceae mainly based on placentation and seed characters. Subsequent treatments preferred to treat Memecylon as a member of Myrtaceae. Again, this group has been included in Melastomataceae by Cronquist . After that, morphological and anatomical character analysis of the Melastomataceae and their traditional allies by Renner identified two major lineages (Melastomataceae and Memecylaceae), and in that classification, Memecylon was placed in the Memecylaceae. Synapomorphies used in this phylogenetic analysis were anther connective and dehiscence, dorsal glands on stamen connectives, endothecium, placentation, locules, seeds, leaf venation, terminal leaf sclereids, paracytic stomata, stomata shape, leaf sclereids, indumentum, ant and mite domatia, wood and growth form characters, which excluded Memecylaceae from Melastomataceae. However, in Memecylon some characters such as seasonal flowering and small size of flowers contributed to the difficulty of assessing relationships based on the morphology. Later, several groups have been either included in broadly defined Memecylaceae or segregated from it. As a result, Memecylaceae comprised the groups Memecylon, Lijndenia, Mouriri, and Votomita.

=== Phylogeny based on molecular treatments ===
Molecular phylogenetic analyses using rbcL sequence data showed that the Melastomataceae lineage consists of a subclade formed by Oliniaceae, Penaeaeae, Phynchocalycaceae and Alzateaceae sister to a subclade formed by Memecylaceae and Melastomataceae sensu stricto. Parsimony analysis showed distinct Myrtaceae and Melastomataceae clades. Subsequently, Bayesian analyses using chloroplast DNA sequences from the rbcL and ndhF genes, and parsimony and maximum likelihood analyses on rRNA, rbcL and atpB sequences, have shown that Memecylaceae is a sister group to Melastomataceae. Later studies using combined exon and intron sequences of the nuclear glyceraldehyde 3-phosphate dehydrogenase gene (GapC) has supported the monophyly of Memecylon. However, the APG IV (Angiosperm Phylogeny Group IV) system of classification, a system of revised and updated classification of flowering plants, now recognizes the groups of Memecylaceae within a broader circumscription of Melastomataceae.

The most recent phylogenetic analysis of Memecylon was based on low-copy nuclear loci using representative taxa across the old world tropics, and this study revealed biogeography and ancestral states of this plant group. In addition, there is a fine-scale study associated with South African Memecylon showing the reticulate evolution of this group.

== Pollination and seed dispersal ==
The dense and axillary showy clusters of Memecylon florets do not produce nectar. These flowers are visited by pollen-gathering bees who vibrate or manipulate the anthers. Anthers open by longitudinal slits and exposed pollen invites pollen gathering bees. Anther appendages serve as a hold for bees’ legs. These flowers have terpenoid secreting glands and bees collect terpenoids. Therefore, buzz pollination is also favored. Berries are dispersed by birds and mammals. Populations of Memecylon are widely scattered within the forests as would be expected in bird-dispersed species.

== Ecology ==
Memecylon produce flowers and fruits more regularly than many trees of the equatorial forests. It provides a food supply for wildlife as a source of fruits. Different sympatric groups appear to segregate mainly by soil moisture.

== Ethnobotany ==
Memecylon has economic, medicinal and horticultural values. A yellow dye and a mordant can be extracted from the leaves. They are traditionally used for dyeing silk in Thailand and the robes of Buddhist monks in Sri Lanka. Fruits are edible and some are used as spices. This group provides hard and valuable timber used for building houses and boats. Wood is used to make rafters, house posts, fuel wood, charcoal, tools, and handles. An infusion of leaves is used as astringent for ophthalmia. The bark is applied as a poultice to bruises. Root and heartwood decoctions are used to bring down fever associated with colds, chicken pox and measles.

== A list of Memecylon species ==
- Memecylon aberrans H.Perrier
- Memecylon accedens R.D.Stone, Ghogue & Cheek
- Memecylon acrocarpum Bakh.f.
- Memecylon acrogenum R.D.Stone
- Memecylon acuminatissimum Blume
- Memecylon acuminatum Sm.
- Memecylon aenigmaticum R.D.Stone
- Memecylon aequidianum Jacq.-Fél.
- Memecylon affine Merr.
- Memecylon afzelii G.Don
- Memecylon agastyamalaianum E.S.S.Kumar, Antony & A.E.S.Khan
- Memecylon alatum Aug.DC.
- Memecylon albescens Jacq.-Fél.
- Memecylon alipes R.D.Stone
- Memecylon ambrense Jacq.-Fél.
- Memecylon amherstianum C.B.Clarke
- Memecylon amoenum Jacq.-Fél.
- Memecylon amplexicaule Roxb.
- Memecylon amplifolium R.D.Stone
- Memecylon amshoffiae Jacq.-Fél.
- Memecylon andamanicum King
- Memecylon angustifolium Wight
- Memecylon antseranense Jacq.-Fél.
- Memecylon apoense Elmer
- Memecylon arcuatomarginatum Gilg ex Engl.
- Memecylon argenteum K.Bremer
- Memecylon arnhemense Whiffin
- Memecylon auratifolium H.Perrier
- Memecylon australissimum R.D.Stone & I.G.Mona
- Memecylon azurinii Quisumb. & Merr.
- Memecylon bachmannii Engl.
- Memecylon bakerianum Cogn.
- Memecylon bakossiense R.D.Stone, Ghogue & Cheek
- Memecylon balakrishnanii Lakshmin. & S.P.Mathew
- Memecylon basilanense Merr.
- Memecylon batekeanum R.D.Stone & G.M.Walters
- Memecylon bernierii Cogn.
- Memecylon bezavonense (Jacq.-Fél.) R.D.Stone
- Memecylon biokoense R.D.Stone
- Memecylon boinense H.Perrier
- Memecylon bokorensis Tagane
- Memecylon borneense Merr.
- Memecylon brachybotrys Merr.
- Memecylon bracteatum Jacq.-Fél.
- Memecylon bracteolatum Bakh.f.
- Memecylon brahense Jacq.-Fél.
- Memecylon bremeri M.B.Viswan.
- Memecylon bretelerianum Jacq.-Fél.
- Memecylon buxifolium Blume
- Memecylon buxoides Wickens
- Memecylon caeruleum Jack
- Memecylon calderense A.Gray
- Memecylon calophyllum Gilg
- Memecylon calyptratum K.Bremer
- Memecylon campanulatum C.B.Clarke
- Memecylon candidum Gilg
- Memecylon candolleanum Cogn.
- Memecylon cantleyi Ridl.
- Memecylon capitellatum L.
- Memecylon capuronii Jacq.-Fél.
- Memecylon cardiophyllum Cogn.
- Memecylon caudatum Craib
- Memecylon celebicum Bakh.f
- Memecylon centrale (Jacq.-Fél.) R.D.Stone
- Memecylon ceramense Bakh.f
- Memecylon cerasiforme Kurz
- Memecylon chevalieri Guillaumin
- Memecylon cinereum King
- Memecylon clarkeanum Cogn.
- Memecylon clavistaminum Jacq.-Fél.
- Memecylon cogniauxii Gilg
- Memecylon collinum Jacq.-Fél.
- Memecylon confertiflorum Cogn.
- Memecylon confusum Blume
- Memecylon conocarpum K.Schum. & Lauterb.
- Memecylon constrictum Craib
- Memecylon cordatum Desr.
- Memecylon cordifolium Merr.
- Memecylon corticosum Ridl.
- Memecylon corymbiforme H.Perrier
- Memecylon cotinifolioides (H.Perrier) Jacq.-Fél.
- Memecylon coursianum Jacq.-Fél.
- Memecylon courtallense Manickam, Murugan, Jothi & Sundaresan
- Memecylon crassifolium Bakh.f.
- Memecylon crassinerve Blume
- Memecylon crassipetiolum Jacq.-Fél.
- Memecylon cumingii Naudin
- Memecylon cuneatum Thwaites
- Memecylon dalleizettei H.Perrier
- Memecylon dallmannense Ohwi
- Memecylon dasyanthum Gilg & Ledermann ex Engl.
- Memecylon delphinense H.Perrier
- Memecylon deminutum Brenan
- Memecylon densiflorum Merr.
- Memecylon dichotomum C.B.Clarke ex King
- Memecylon diluviorum Exell
- Memecylon discolor Cogn.
- Memecylon dolichophyllum Naudin
- Memecylon dubium Jacq.-Fél.
- Memecylon durum Cogn.
- Memecylon edule Roxb.
- Memecylon eduliforme Aug.DC.
- Memecylon eglandulosum H.Perrier
- Memecylon elaeagni Blume
- Memecylon elegans Kurz
- Memecylon ellipticum Thwaites
- Memecylon elliptifolium Merr.
- Memecylon elongatum Merr.
- Memecylon emancipatum R.D.Stone
- Memecylon englerianum Cogn.
- Memecylon erythranthum Gilg
- Memecylon excelsum Blume
- Memecylon faucherei Danguy
- Memecylon fernandesiorum Jacq.-Fél.
- Memecylon fianarantse Jacq.-Fél.
- Memecylon flavescens Gamble
- Memecylon flavovirens Baker
- Memecylon floridum Ridl.
- Memecylon fragrans A.Fern. & R.Fern.
- Memecylon fruticosum King
- Memecylon fugax R.D.Stone
- Memecylon fuscescens Thwaites
- Memecylon galeatum H.Perrier
- Memecylon garcinioides Blume
- Memecylon geddesianum Craib
- Memecylon geoffrayi Guillaumin
- Memecylon germainii A.Fern. & R.Fern.
- Memecylon gibbosum Bakh.f.
- Memecylon giganteum Alston
- Memecylon gitingense Elmer
- Memecylon gopalanii Murugan & Manickam
- Memecylon gracile Bedd.
- Memecylon gracilipedicellatum Jacq.-Fél.
- Memecylon gracilipes C.B.Rob.
- Memecylon gracillimum Alston
- Memecylon grande Retz.
- Memecylon grandifolium Naudin
- Memecylon greenwayi Brenan
- Memecylon griffithianum Naudin
- Memecylon hainanense Merr. & Chun
- Memecylon harmandii Guillaumin
- Memecylon helferi Cogn.
- Memecylon heyneanum Benth. ex Wight & Arn.
- Memecylon hookeri Thwaites
- Memecylon huillense A.Fern. & R.Fern.
- Memecylon hullettii King
- Memecylon humbertii H.Perrier
- Memecylon hylandii Whiffin
- Memecylon hyleastrum R.D.Stone & Ghogue
- Memecylon idukkianum Nampy & Syam Radh
- Memecylon impressivenum R.D.Stone
- Memecylon inalatum Jacq.-Fél.
- Memecylon incisilobum R.D.Stone & I.G.Mona
- Memecylon infuscatum Jacq.-Fél.
- Memecylon insigne Mansf.
- Memecylon insperatum A.C.Sm.
- Memecylon insulare A.Fern. & R.Fern.
- Memecylon interjectum R.D.Stone
- Memecylon intermedium Blume
- Memecylon isaloense Jacq.-Fél.
- Memecylon ivohibense Jacq.-Fél.
- Memecylon jadhavii K.N.Reddy, C.S.Reddy & V.S.Raju
- Memecylon jambosioides Wight
- Memecylon klaineanum Jacq.-Fél.
- Memecylon kollimalayanum M.B.Viswan.
- Memecylon korupense R.D.Stone
- Memecylon kosiense R.D.Stone & I.G.Mona
- Memecylon kunstleri King
- Memecylon kupeanum R.D.Stone, Ghogue & Cheek
- Memecylon kurichiarense Sivu, Aswathi & N.S.Pradeep
- Memecylon lanceolatum Blanco
- Memecylon lancifolium Ridl.
- Memecylon langbianense Guillaumin
- Memecylon laruei Merr.
- Memecylon lateriflorum (G.Don) Bremek.
- Memecylon laurentii De Wild.
- Memecylon laureolum Jacq.-Fél.
- Memecylon lawsonii Gamble
- Memecylon leucanthum Thwaites
- Memecylon liberiae Gilg ex Engl.
- Memecylon ligustrifolium Champ. ex Benth.
- Memecylon lilacinum Zoll. & Moritzi
- Memecylon littorale Merr.
- Memecylon loheri Merr.
- Memecylon longicuspe Baker
- Memecylon longifolium Cogn.
- Memecylon longipetalum H.Perrier
- Memecylon louvelianum H.Perrier
- Memecylon luchuenense C.Chen
- Memecylon lurerii Naudin
- Memecylon lushingtonii Gamble
- Memecylon macneillianum M.Das Das, G.S.Giri, A.Pramanik & D.Maity
- Memecylon macrocarpum Thwaites
- Memecylon macrodendron Gilg ex Engl.
- Memecylon macrophyllum Thwaites
- Memecylon madgolense Gamble
- Memecylon magnifoliatum A.Fern. & R.Fern.
- Memecylon malaccense C.B.Clarke ex Ridl.
- Memecylon mamfeanum (Jacq.-Fél.) R.D.Stone, Ghogue & Cheek
- Memecylon mananjebense H.Perrier
- Memecylon mandrarense H.Perrier
- Memecylon mangiferoides Jacq.-Fél.
- Memecylon manickamii Murugan, Sundaresan & Jothi
- Memecylon mayottense R.D.Stone
- Memecylon megacarpum Furtado
- Memecylon megaspermum Jacq.-Fél.
- Memecylon memoratum Jacq.-Fél.
- Memecylon merguicum (C.B.Clarke) King
- Memecylon minimifolium H.Perrier
- Memecylon minutiflorum Miq.
- Memecylon mocquerysii Aug.DC.
- Memecylon monchyanum Backer & Beknopte
- Memecylon mouririoides Jacq.-Fél.
- Memecylon multinode Jacq.-Fél.
- Memecylon mundanthuraianum M.B.Viswan. & Manik.
- Memecylon myrianthum Gilg
- Memecylon myricoides Naudin
- Memecylon myrtiforme Naudin
- Memecylon myrtilloides Markgr.
- Memecylon natalense Markgr.
- Memecylon nigrescens Hook. & Arn.
- Memecylon nodosum (Engl.) Gilg ex Engl.
- Memecylon normandii Jacq.-Fél.
- Memecylon novoguineense Baker f.
- Memecylon nubigenum R.D.Stone & I.G.Mona
- Memecylon obscurinerve Merr.
- Memecylon obtusifolium Merr.
- Memecylon occultum Jacq.-Fél.
- Memecylon ochroleucum Bakh.f.
- Memecylon octocostatum Merr. & Chun
- Memecylon odoratum Elmer
- Memecylon oleifolium Blume
- Memecylon oligophlebium Merr.
- Memecylon orbiculare Thwaites
- Memecylon oubanguianum Jacq.-Fél.
- Memecylon ovatifolium (Poir.) Wickens
- Memecylon ovatum Sm.
- Memecylon ovoideum Thwaites
- Memecylon pachyphyllum Merr.
- Memecylon pallidum Merr.
- Memecylon paniculatum Jack
- Memecylon papuanum Merr. & L.M.Perry
- Memecylon paradoxum Jacq.-Fél.
- Memecylon parvifolium Thwaites
- Memecylon pauciflorum Blume
- Memecylon pedunculatum Jacq.-Fél.
- Memecylon pendulum Chih C.Wang, Y.H.Tseng, Y.T.Chen & Kun C.Chang
- Memecylon peracuminatum H.Perrier
- Memecylon perangustum Jacq.-Fél.
- Memecylon perditum R.D.Stone
- Memecylon pergamentaceum Cogn.
- Memecylon perplexum M.Hughes
- Memecylon perrieri Danguy
- Memecylon phanerophlebium Merr.
- Memecylon phyllanthifolium Thwaites ex Triana
- Memecylon pileatum Jacq.-Fél.
- Memecylon planifolium Jacq.-Fél.
- Memecylon plebejum Kurz
- Memecylon polyanthemos Hook.f.
- Memecylon polyanthum H.L.Li
- Memecylon ponmudianum Sivu, N.S.Pradeep & Pandur.
- Memecylon procerum Thwaites
- Memecylon protrusum Bakh.f.
- Memecylon pseudomegacarpum M.Hughes
- Memecylon pseudomyrtiforme H.Perrier
- Memecylon pterocarpum H.Perrier
- Memecylon pterocladum R.D.Stone
- Memecylon pteropus Merr.
- Memecylon pubescens King
- Memecylon pulvinatum Jacq.-Fél.
- Memecylon purpurascens Jacq.-Fél.
- Memecylon pusilliflorum Cogn.
- Memecylon ramosii Merr.
- Memecylon ramosum Jacq.-Fél.
- Memecylon randerianum S.M.Almeida & M.R.Almeida
- Memecylon revolutum Thwaites
- Memecylon rheophyticum R.D.Stone, Ghogue & Cheek
- Memecylon rhinophyllum Thwaites
- Memecylon rivulare K.Bremer
- Memecylon roseum H.Perrier
- Memecylon rostratum Thwaites
- Memecylon rotundatum (Thwaites) Cogn.
- Memecylon rovumense R.D.Stone & I.G.Mona
- Memecylon royenii Blume
- Memecylon rubiflorum Jacq.-Fél.
- Memecylon ruptile K.Bremer
- Memecylon sabulosum Jacq.-Fél.
- Memecylon sahyadricum Sivu, Ratheesh & N.S.Pradeep
- Memecylon salicifolium Jacq.-Fél.
- Memecylon sambiranense H.Perrier
- Memecylon schraderbergense Mansf.
- Memecylon schumannianum Mansf.
- Memecylon scolopacinum Ridl.
- Memecylon scutellatum (Lour.) Hook. & Arn.
- Memecylon sejunctum R.D.Stone
- Memecylon semsei A.Fern. & R.Fern.
- Memecylon sepicanum Mansf.
- Memecylon sessile Benth. ex Wight & Arn.
- Memecylon sessilifolium Merr.
- Memecylon simulans (Jacq.-Fél.) R.D.Stone & Ghogue
- Memecylon sisparense Gamble
- Memecylon sitanum Jacq.-Fél.
- Memecylon sivadasanii N.Mohanan, Ravi, Kiran Raj & Shaju
- Memecylon sivagirianum S.Prabhu & Murugan
- Memecylon sorsogonense Elmer
- Memecylon soutpansbergense R.D.Stone & I.G.Mona
- Memecylon stenophyllum Merr.
- Memecylon strumosum Naudin
- Memecylon subcaudatum Merr.
- Memecylon subcordifolium Bakh.f.
- Memecylon subcuneatum H.Perrier
- Memecylon subfurfuraceum Merr.
- Memecylon subramanii A.N.Henry
- Memecylon subsessile H.Perrier
- Memecylon sumatrense Bakh.f.
- Memecylon sylvaticum Thwaites
- Memecylon symplociforme Merr.
- Memecylon talbotianum D.Brandis
- Memecylon tayabense Merr.
- Memecylon teitense Wickens
- Memecylon tenuipes Merr.
- Memecylon terminale Dalzell
- Memecylon terminaliiflorum Elmer
- Memecylon tetrapterum Cogn. ex Scott Elliot
- Memecylon thouarsianum Naudin
- Memecylon thouvenotii Danguy
- Memecylon tirunelvelicum Murugan, Manickam & Sundaresan
- Memecylon toamasinense Jacq.-Fél.
- Memecylon torrei A.Fern. & R.Fern.
- Memecylon torricellense Lauterb.
- Memecylon travancorense Sivu, N.S.Pradeep, Pandur. & Ratheesh
- Memecylon tricolor Craib
- Memecylon trunciflorum R.D.Stone
- Memecylon tsaratananense (H.Perrier) Jacq.-Fél.
- Memecylon uapacoides Jacq.-Fél.
- Memecylon ulopterum DC.
- Memecylon umbellatum Burm.f.
- Memecylon urceolatum Cogn.
- Memecylon utericarpum Jacq.-Fél.
- Memecylon vaccinioides Jacq.-Fél.
- Memecylon varians Thwaites
- Memecylon venosum Merr.
- Memecylon verruculosum Brenan
- Memecylon virescens Hook.f.
- Memecylon viride Hutch. & Dalziel
- Memecylon vitiense A.Gray
- Memecylon wallichii Ridl.
- Memecylon wayanadense Ratheesh, Sivu & N.S.Pradeep
- Memecylon wightii Thwaites
- Memecylon xiphophyllum R.D.Stone
- Memecylon zambeziense A.Fern. & R.Fern.
- Memecylon zenkeri Gilg

A number of taxa have been recently re-assigned to other species. These include:

- Memecylon arnottianum Wight ex Thwaites, synonym of Lijndenia capitellata (Arn.) K.Bremer
- Memecylon bequaertii De Wild., synonym of Warneckea bequaertii (De Wild.) Jacq.-Fél.
- Memecylon elegantulum Thwaites, synonym of Memecylon rostratum Thwaites
- Memecylon gardneri Thwaites, synonym of Lijndenia gardneri (Thwaites) K.Bremer
- Memecylon sessilicarpum A.Fern. & R.Fern., synonym of Warneckea sessilicarpa (A.Fern. & R.Fern.) Jacq.-Fél.
- Memecylon sphaerocarpum DC., synonym of Memecylon ovatifolium (Poir.) Wickens

== Sources ==
- Plants of World Online (POWO): Memecylon L.: Accepted Species.
