= Memecylaceae =

Extinct family of trees

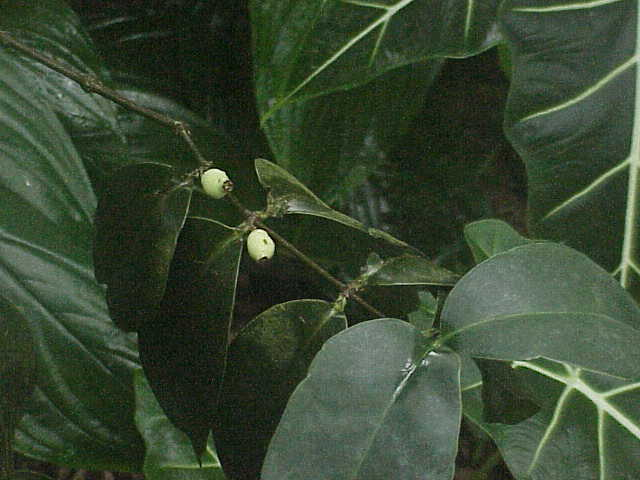
Memecylon floribundum

Memecylaceae DC. was a family of flowering plants. The family included about 430 species of trees and shrubs in seven genera. Memecylaceae are widespread in the tropics. The family has now been included within the Melastomataceae under the APG III system of classification, When classified alone, this family included the following genera:

- Lijndenia
- Memecylon
- Mouriri
- Pternandra
- Spathandra
- Votomita
- Warneckea
