= Memecylon lilacinum =

Scientific classification
- Kingdom: Plantae
- Clade: Tracheophytes
- Clade: Angiosperms
- Clade: Eudicots
- Clade: Rosids
- Order: Myrtales
- Family: Melastomataceae
- Genus: Memecylon
- Species: M. lilacinum

Binomial name
- Memecylon lilacinum Zoll. & Moritzi

Synonyms
- Memecylon capitellatum Blume, n.b. not Memecylon capitellatum L.; Memecylon confine Blume; Memecylon glomeratum Blume; Memecylon hepaticum Blume; Memecylon laevigatum Blume; Memecylon marginatum Blume; Memecylon myrsinoides Blume; Memecylon myrtilli Blume; Memecylon nigrescens Miq.; Memecylon pachyderme Wall.; Memecylon pseudonigrescens Blume; Memecylon vosmaerianum Scheff.

Species of tree in the Melastomataceae family

Memecylon lilacinum is a tree species in the Melastomataceae family. It is usually an understorey species in closed forests. It is native to an area of tropical Asia, from Jawa to Philippines to Vietnam and the Andaman Islands and Myanmar. It is a food plant for the macaque Macaca facsicularis and a bee in the Megachilidae family.

== Description ==
A perennial tree, growing 6-7m tall, sometimes to 25m. It flowers in July and has fruit from October to May in Cambodia.

== Taxonomy ==
This species has been identified by molecular phylogenetics using nuclear ribosomal DNA as being in a Malesian/Southeast Asian/Chinese clade with Memecylon caeruleum, Memecylon cantleyi, Memecylon pauciflorum, Memecylon plebujum, and Memecylon scutellatum.

The species was described by the Swiss botanists Heinrich Zollinger (1818–59) and Alexandre Moritzi (1806-50).

== Distribution ==
The species is native to an area from Jawa, Borneo and Philippines to Mainland Southeast Asia and the Andaman Islands. Countries and regions that it is recorded from include: Indonesia (Jawa, Kalimantan, Sumatera); Philippines; Malaysia (Sabah, Sarawak, Peninsular Malaysia); Cambodia; Vietnam; Myanmar; India (Andaman Islands).

== Habitat and ecology ==
M. lilacinum grows in the lowland dipterocarp forest surrounding Lake Bera/Tasik Bera, Pahang, Malaysia. This tall closed forest is dominated by the emergent Koompassia malaccensis and 30-40m tall canopy taxa Anisoptera scaphula, Ctenolophon parvifolius, Dipterocarpus cornutus, D. costulatus, D. crinitus, D. kerrii, Hopea mengerawan, Parashorea stellata, Payena lucida, Shorea curtisii ssp. curtisii, S. ovalis, S. parvifolia, Rubroshorea leprosula and Vatica pauciflora. Common in the lower strata are Canarium littorale, Dyera costulata, Ixonanthes icosandra, Gluta elegans, and Endospermum diadenum.

Growing on sandbars along the east coast of peninsular Thailand (Nakhon Si Thammarat, Songkhla and Narathiwat Provinces), this taxa is found in the widespread Memecylon lilacinum-Vatica harmandiana community. The 10m high canopy of this community is dominated by V. harmandiana, with Syzygium grande, Atalantia monophylla, Pittosporum ferruguineum and Memecylon edule common. The secondary tree layer (at 6-7m) is dominated by this tree, M. lilacinum. A shrub layer at 3-4m has Diospyros ferrea, Guioa pleuropteris and Euonymus cochinchinensis dominating, and is underlain by a herb layer up to 1m.

In the Khao Yai National Park, central Thailand, near Bangkok, the species is one of the most abundant in the Mo Singto study area forest. The study area is primarily for the observation of white-handed gibbons (Hylobates lar).

The Bokor Plateau at Preah Monivong National Park, southeastern Cambodia has a rare and significant flora of stunted forest and heathland, first studied by the famous Cambodian botanist Pauline Dy Phon. This taxa, M. lilacinum occurs as a stunted tree in montane forest at 928m elevation.

The tree is a moderately abundant understorey plant in the mixed evergreen and deciduous, seasonal, hardwood forest along the Mekong River in Kratie and Steung Treng Provinces, northeastern Cambodia. It grows on soils there derived from metamorphic sandstone bedrock, at 25-30m altitude.

Macaca fascicularis ("crab-eating macaque"), has been observed eating the flowers and leaves of the plant, amongst hundreds of other plant species, in Bukit Timah Nature Reserve, Singapore.

The tree is a food plant for the Peninsular Malaysian bee species Chalicodoma (Alocanthedon) memecylonae, Hymenoptera, Megachilidae.
