= Memecylon idukkianum =

Scientific classification
- Kingdom: Plantae
- Clade: Embryophytes
- Clade: Tracheophytes
- Clade: Angiosperms
- Clade: Eudicots
- Clade: Rosids
- Order: Myrtales
- Family: Melastomataceae
- Genus: Memecylon
- Species: M. idukkianum

Binomial name
- Memecylon idukkianum Nampy & Radh

Species of tree

Memecylon idukkianum is a species of small tree endemic to the Western Ghats. The species was identified during a three-year plant survey in Mathikettan Shola National Park, where it was found in eight locations.

== Description ==
Branchlets are quadrangularm, and leaves have an acute or obtuse apex. Petioles are 5–9 mm long. Flowers are arranged in 15-20 flowered cymes. Unlike other Memecylon species, M. idukkianum has pure white flowers.
