= Memecylon discolor =

Conservation status
- Endangered (IUCN 2.3)

Scientific classification
- Kingdom: Plantae
- Clade: Tracheophytes
- Clade: Angiosperms
- Clade: Eudicots
- Clade: Rosids
- Order: Myrtales
- Family: Melastomataceae
- Genus: Memecylon
- Species: M. discolor

Binomial name
- Memecylon discolor Cogn.

Synonyms
- Memecylon heyneanum var. angustifolium C.B.Clarke

Species of flowering plant

Memecylon discolor is a species of plant in the family Melastomataceae. It is endemic to Sri Lanka.
