= Memecylon candidum =

Conservation status
- Vulnerable (IUCN 2.3)

Scientific classification
- Kingdom: Plantae
- Clade: Tracheophytes
- Clade: Angiosperms
- Clade: Eudicots
- Clade: Rosids
- Order: Myrtales
- Family: Melastomataceae
- Genus: Memecylon
- Species: M. candidum

Binomial name
- Memecylon candidum Gilg

Synonyms
- Memecylon bipindense Gilg ex A.Fern. & R.Fern.; Memecylon rauschianum Gilg & Ledermann ex Engl.

Species of flowering plant

Memecylon candidum is a species of plant in the family Melastomataceae. It is found in Cameroon and Nigeria. It is threatened by habitat loss.
