= Memecylon myrtiforme =

Conservation status
- Critically Endangered (IUCN 2.3)

Scientific classification
- Kingdom: Plantae
- Clade: Tracheophytes
- Clade: Angiosperms
- Clade: Eudicots
- Clade: Rosids
- Order: Myrtales
- Family: Melastomataceae
- Genus: Memecylon
- Species: M. myrtiforme

Binomial name
- Memecylon myrtiforme Naudin

Species of flowering plant

Memecylon myrtiforme is a species of plant in the family Melastomataceae. It is endemic to Mauritius. Its natural habitat is subtropical or tropical dry forests.
