= Lijndenia brenanii =

Conservation status
- Critically endangered, possibly extinct (IUCN 3.1)

Scientific classification
- Kingdom: Plantae
- Clade: Tracheophytes
- Clade: Angiosperms
- Clade: Eudicots
- Clade: Rosids
- Order: Myrtales
- Family: Melastomataceae
- Genus: Lijndenia
- Species: L. brenanii

Binomial name
- Lijndenia brenanii (A. & R.Fernandes) Jacq.Fl.

Species of flowering plant

Lijndenia brenanii is a species of plant in the family Melastomataceae. It is endemic to Tanzania.
