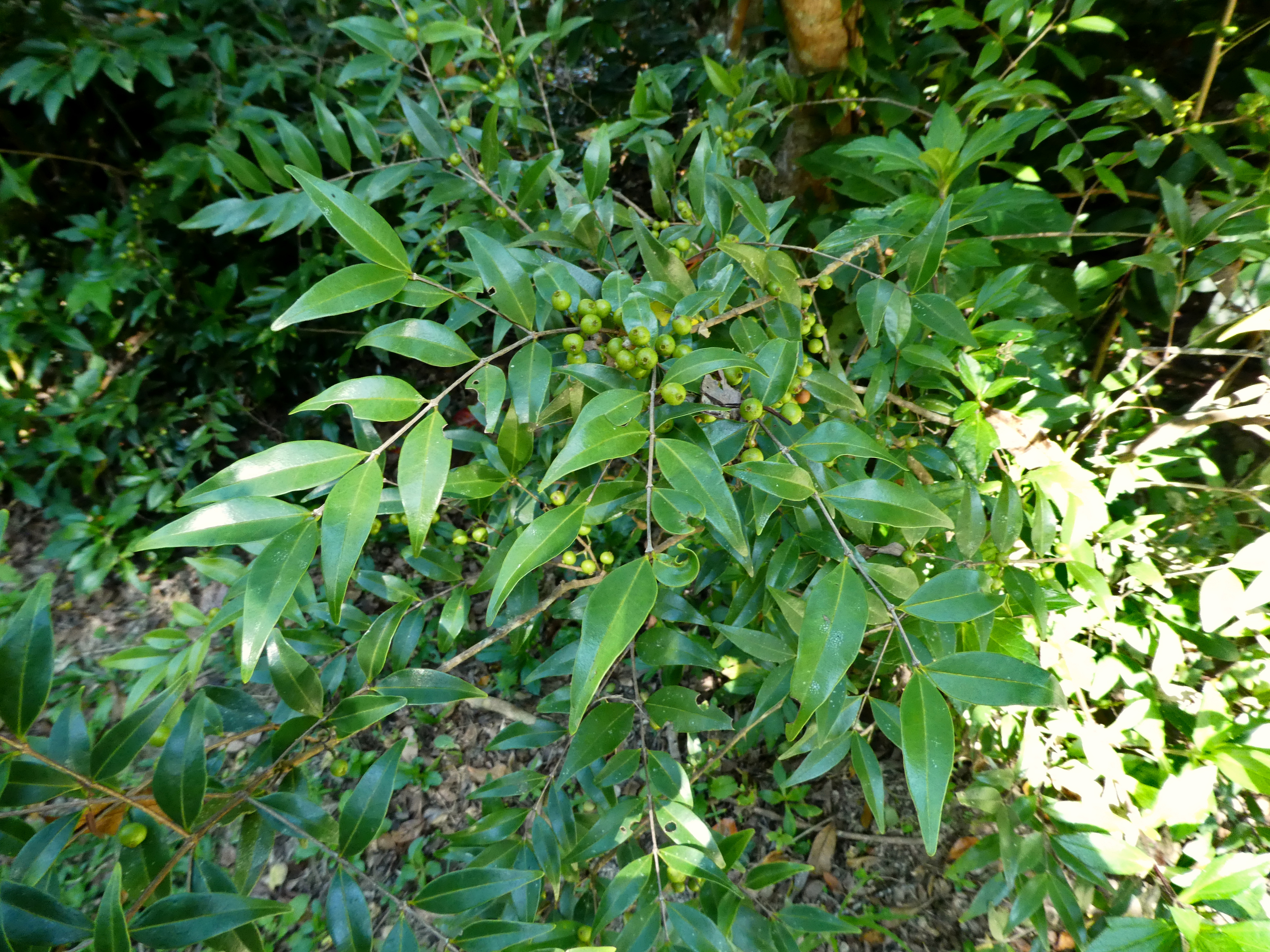
- Fruiting plant near Cairns, Queensland

Conservation status
- Least Concern (NCA)

Scientific classification
- Kingdom: Plantae
- Clade: Tracheophytes
- Clade: Angiosperms
- Clade: Eudicots
- Clade: Rosids
- Order: Myrtales
- Family: Melastomataceae
- Genus: Memecylon
- Species: M. pauciflorum

Binomial name
- Memecylon pauciflorum Blume

Synonyms
- Memecylon australe F.Muell. ex Triana; Memecylon capitellatum Span.; Memecylon pulchellum Ridl.; Memecylon umbellatum Benth.

= Memecylon pauciflorum =

Species of tree

Memecylon pauciflorum is a species of plants in the Melastomataceae family. It grows as a tree or shrub in northern Australia and tropical and subtropical Asia. An understorey species typically, it grows in a variety of communities. The possum Petropseudes dahli (rock-haunting possum) uses this species as one of their scent-marking sites. It is a host to a number of funguses. People in Australia and in Thailand use the plant in folk medicine, though no efficacy has been demonstrated.

== Description ==
This plant is a tree or shrub up to 10 m (33 ft) tall, with a trunk that rarely exceeds 30 cm (12 in) diameter. It is many-branched, with smooth 4-sided branches. The leaves are up to 7 cm (2.8 in) long by 3 cm (1.2 in) wide, the lateral veins barely visible on upper surface, but make inconspicuous loops or an intramarginal vein quite close to the margin. There are small oil dots visible at low magnification (e.g. with hand lens); stipules are absent, but scars are visible on twigs between petioles that resemble stipular scars. The upper surface of petiole is grooved.

The inflorescences are shorter than leaves. The pink/green flowers are quite small with petals about 2 mm (0.08 in) long. There are eight stamens, and the anthers have a long spur at the base, which has a raised gland on the opposite side to filament attachment. The fruit are globose or depressed globose, about 8 mm (0.31 in) long and 9 mm (0.35 in) diameter, with a persistent calyx at the apex. Seeds are globular, about 4–5 mm (0.16–0.20 in) long by 5–6 mm (0.20–0.24 in) diameter, each weighing about 130 mg (2.0 gr).

The cotyledons are crumpled and folded many times, more or less semiorbicular in the seedling, shortly petiolate and about 16–20 mm (0.63–0.79 in) by 15–30 mm (0.59–1.18 in). The stipules on cotyledons are usually visible, and the hypocotyl is winged. The glabrous leaves are linear and narrowly elliptic to elliptic at the tenth leaf stage with stipules or stipule-like structures usually visible.

The germination time of seeds is from 20 to 63 days. In the Kimberley, Western Australia it flowers in January and February or in April. In China it flowers in April and May, with fruiting occurring in November.

Characteristics that distinguish it from other Memecylon species in China are: that it is a shrub or small tree (less than 6m tall); the blade of the leaves are some 3.5-8 by 0.6-3.5 cm in size; the blade of the leaf is some 1.4-3.2 times as long as it is broad with a base not decurrent on petiole; the anther is connected abaxially with a circular concave gland; smooth and glossy leaf blade on both surfaces; fruit is not ribbed; cymose inflorescences; and again on both surfaces the leaf blade is glabrous and glossy.

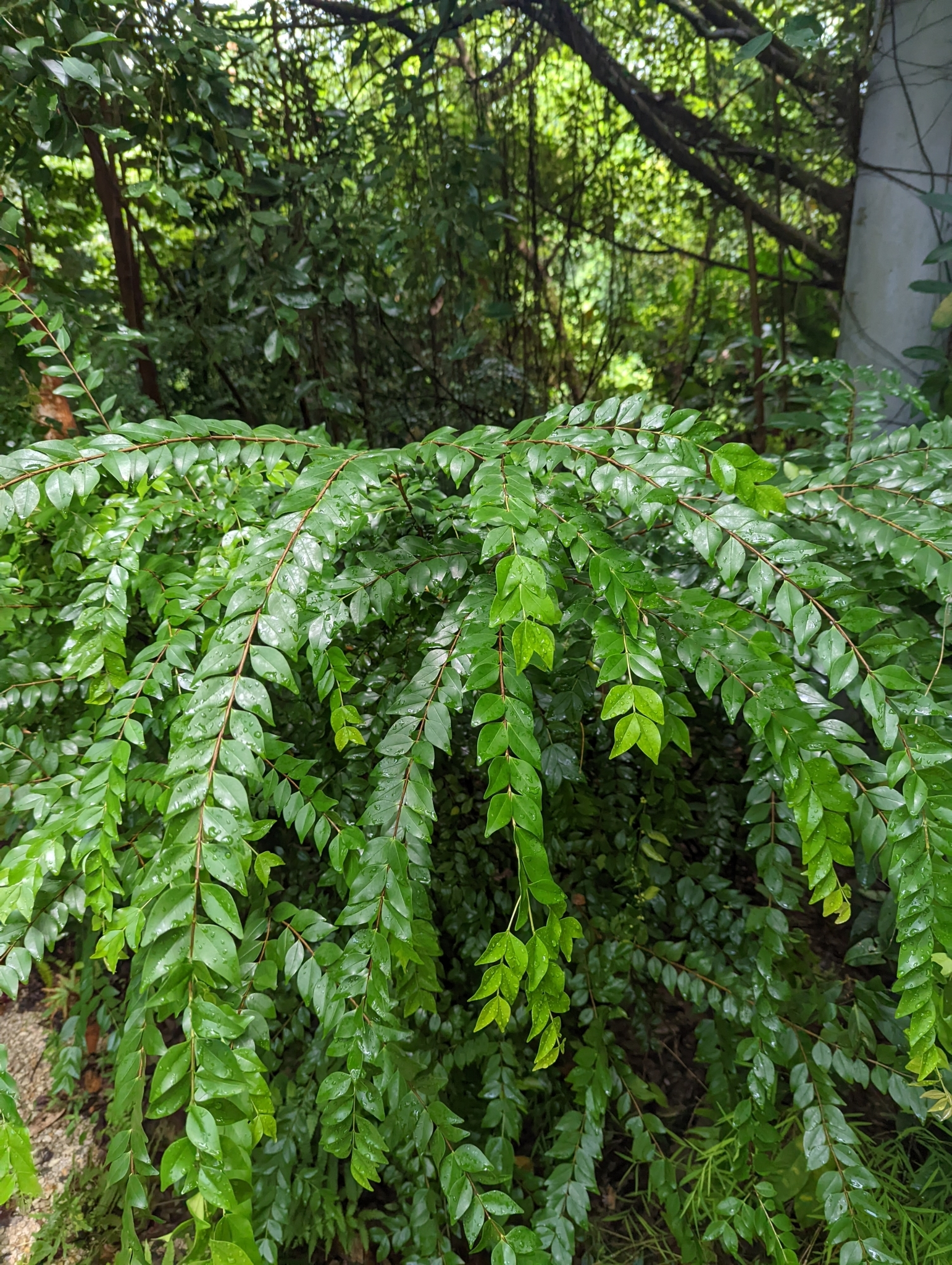
Foliage

== Taxonomy ==
This species was first described in 1851 by the Braunschweig-born botanist Carl Ludwig Blume (1796-1862). He spent his working life in now Indonesia, then the Dutch East Indies, where he was at the now Bogor Botanical Gardens, and in the Netherlands, where he was at the then Rijksherbarium, Leiden, now the Nationaal Herbarium Nederland, Leiden. He published a description of the plant in 1850, however the 1851 description in his work Museum botanicum Lugduno-Batavum, sive, Stirpium exoticarum novarum vel minus cognitarum ex vivis aut siccis brevis expositio et descriptio is held to be authoritative.on Botanicus

This species has been identified by molecular phylogenetics using nuclear ribosomal DNA as being in a Malesian/Southeast Asian/Chinese clade with Memecylon caeruleum, Memecylon cantleyi, Memecylon lilacinum, Memecylon plebujum, and Memecylon scutellatum.

== Distribution ==
This species is native to an area from northern Australia to tropical and subtropical Asia. Countries and regions in which this taxa grows are: Australia (Queensland, Northern Territory, Western Australia); Malaysia (Peninsular Malaysia); Vietnam; Zhōngguó/China (Hainan, Guangdong); Laos; Myanmar; Bangladesh; India (Andaman Islands). In Queensland, the tree/shrub occurs from southeastern region to the central- and north-east and Cape York Peninsula. In Western Australia it is found in the northern Kimberley.

== Habitat, ecology ==
In Australia M. pauciflorum grows from near sea level to 400m elevation. It is found as an understory tree in monsoon-, drier or more seasonal rain-, open- and littoral-forests and in woodlands. In the Kimberley, Western Australia, it grows on sandy soils, in sandstone gorges. In China it is found in forests and mountain slopes.

A publication of Queensland Herbarium on the broad vegetation groups present in that state of Australia includes a number of communities that include the species. The following table summarises the information.

Broad Vegetation Groups in Queensland that include M. pauciflorum
Broad Vegetation Group	subgroup	Bioregion	Mean annual rainfall	Soils	Emergents	Canopy	Layer that includes M. pauciflorum
2 Complex to simple, semi-deciduous mesophyll to notophyll vine forests, sometimes with Araucaria cunninghamii (hoop pine)	2b Semi-deciduous mesophyll to notophyll vine forests usually on granitic ranges	Cape York Peninsula	1200-2000mm	Yellow kandosols, yellow dermosols	Araucaria cunninghamii sometimes present to 30m	Canarium australianum, Bombax ceiba var. leiocarpum, Buchanania arborescens, Antiaris toxicaria var. macrophylla, Sterculia quadrifida, Acacia auriculiformis, A. polystachya, Aidia racemosa, Albizia lebbeck, Beilschmiedia obtusifolia, Dysoxylum acutangulum, Maranthes corymbosa, Myristica insipida, Polyscias elegans, Terminalia subacroptera, 20m	low tree/shrub layer
2 Complex to simple, semi-deciduous mesophyll to notophyll vine forests, sometimes with A. cunninghamii	2c Semi-deciduous notophyll vine forests to simple evergreen notophyll vine forests, frequently with Welchiodendron longivalve on northern Cape York Peninsula	CYP	1600-2000mm	Yellow and red kandosols	rare	W. longivalve, Acacia polystachya, Canarium australianum, Buchanania arborescens, Endiandra glauca, Alstonia actinophylla, A. spectabilis, Blepharocarya involucrigera, Sterculia quadrifida, Planchonella chartacea, Sersalisia sericea, Flindersia ifflaiana, Syzygium forte, Beilschmiedia obtusifolia, Podocarpus grayae, Bombax ceiba var. leiocarpum, Cryptocarya cunninghamii, Halfordia kendack, 17m	mid-dense shrub/ low tree layer
3 Notophyll vine forests/ thickets (sometimes with sclerophyll and/or Araucarian emergents) on coastal dunes and sand masses	3a Evergreen to semi-deciduous, notophyll to microphyll vine forests/ thickets on beach ridges and coastal dunes, occasionally A. cunninghamii microphyll vine forests on dunes	CYP, Gulf Plains, Wet Tropics, Central Queensland Coast	>1200mm	Aeric podosols, semiaquic podosols or bleached-orthic tenosols	A. cunninghamii, occasionally, 25m	Terminalia muelleri, Manilkara kauki, Mimusops elengi, Pleiogynium timoriense, Gyrocarpus americanus, Sterculia quadrifida, Buchanania arborescens, Acacia polystachya, Celtis paniculata, Acacia crassicarpa, Syzygium forte, Drypetes deplanchei, Canarium australianum, Pandanus tectorius, Cupaniopsis anacardioides, 10m	sparse shrub/low tree layer
5 Notophyll to microphyll vine forests, frequently with Araucaria spp. or Agathis spp. (kauri pines)	5b Notophyll to microphyll vine forests, frequently with A. cunninghamii, on ranges of central coastal bioregions	Central Queensland Coast, Wet Tropics	1200-2000mm	Red ferrosols, red and brown Dermosols	A. cunninghamii, sometimes, >18m	Argyrodendron polyandrum, Falcataria toona, Dendrocnide photiniphylla, Cryptocarya hypospodia, C. bidwillii, C. triplinervis, Diospyros hebecarpa, Pleiogynium timoriense, Macropteranthes fitzalanii, Terminalia porphyrocarpa, Flindersia schottiana, Drypetes deplanchei, Euroschinus falcatus, Cleistanthus dallachyanus and Olea paniculata	sparse low tree/ shrub layer
5 Notophyll to microphyll vine forests, frequently with Araucaria spp. or Agathis spp. (kauri pines)	5c Simple to complex notophyll vine forests, often with Agathis spp. on ranges and uplands of the Wet Tropics bioregion	Wet Tropics, Einasleigh Uplands	1600-3000mm	Red and brown dermosols, red ferrosols	Agathis robusta, frequent, 35m	Argyrodendron polyandrum, Falcataria toona, Aleurites moluccanus, Cryptocarya triplinervis, Ficus benjamina, Flindersia schottiana var. pubescens, Linociera ramiflora, Pleiogynium timoriense, Polyalthia nitidissima	mid-dense subcanopy and low tree layer
7 Semi-evergreen to deciduous microphyll vine thickets	7b Deciduous microphyll vine thickets on ranges and heavy clay alluvia in northern bioregions (CYP alluvial clays)	CYP, Wet Tropics	1200-2000mm	Yellow and brown dermosols, brown or grey vertosols, dermosolic oxyaquic hydrosols	Lagerstroemia engleriana, Bombax ceiba var. leiocarpum, Eucalyptus microtheca, up to 25m	Lagerstroemia engleriana, Strychnos lucida, Diospyros hebecarpa, Croton arnhemicus, Larsenaikia ochreata, Memecylon pauciflorum, 5-10m(-18m)	canopy layer
7 Semi-evergreen to deciduous microphyll vine thickets	7b Deciduous microphyll vine thickets on ranges and heavy clay alluvia in northern bioregions (CYP rocky slopes and ranges)	CYP, Wet Tropics	1200-2000mm	Orthic or bleached-leptic tenosols, brown dermosols, yellow kandosols	Gyrocarpus americanus. Bombax ceiba var. leiocarpum, frequent, 12-5m	Cochlospermum gillivraei, Canarium australianum, Croton arnhemicus, Terminalia muelleri, Acacia polystachya, Gyrocarpus americanus, Bombax ceiba var. leiocarpum, 5-12m	sparse to mid-dense shrub layer

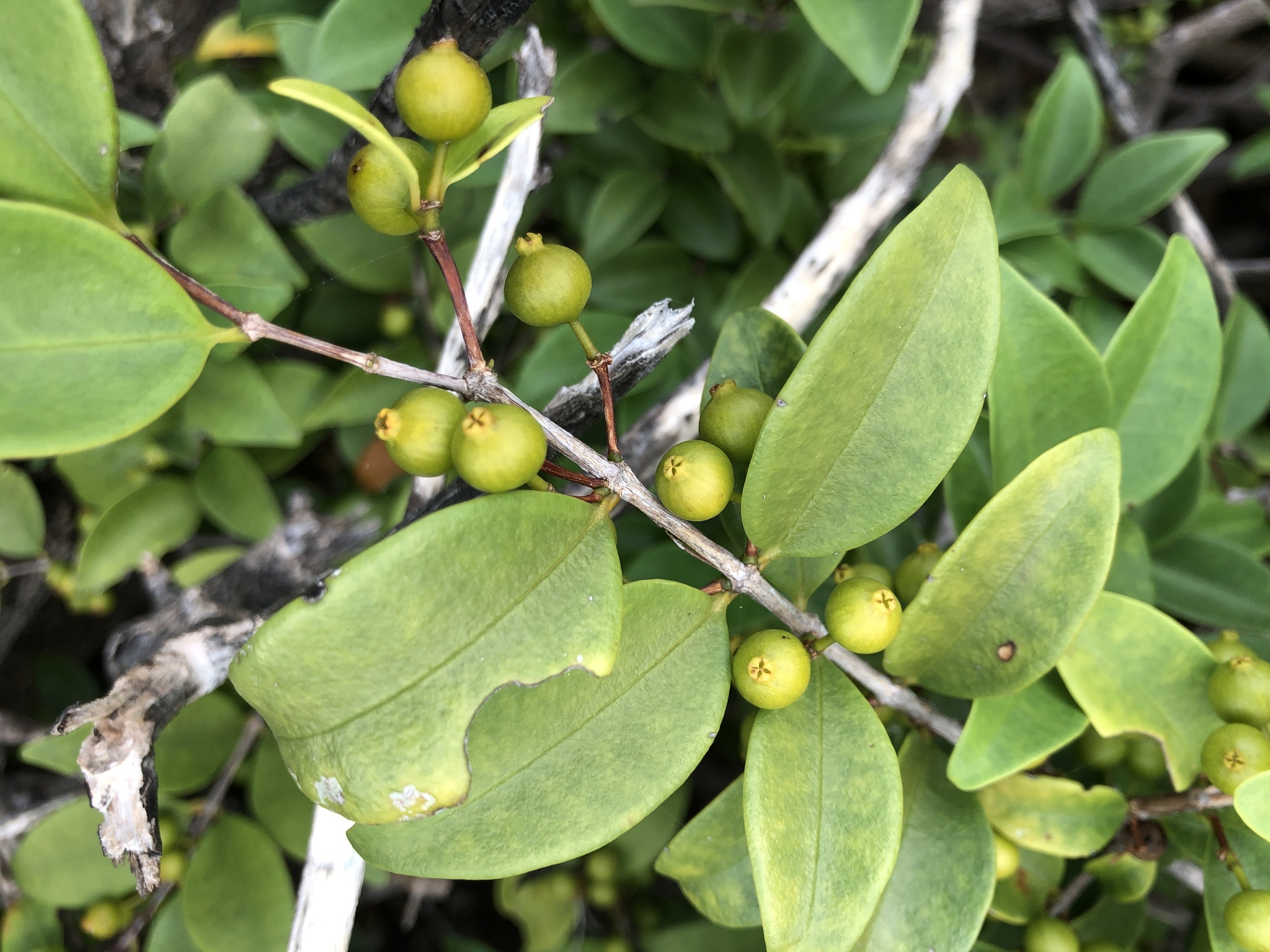
Fruit detail

The possum Petropseudes dahli (rock-haunting possum), uses this tree as a deposit for scent. Ten tree species, rocks and termite mounds were used for scent-marking. The scent is emitted by caudal glands on individuals rumps, cloacal secretions are possibly also involved. The secretion is orange-coloured, molasses-like in texture and has a sweet, musky odour, that humans can smell up to 50m away.

In the Kilim Karst Geoforest Park area (Langkawi, Malaysia), the plant grows in association with mangrove forests, it is moderately abundant.

It is a host to the following taxa: the pathogenic fungi Botryosphaeria purandharensis and Mycosphaerella multiloculata, and other fungi Acrocordiella occulta, Lecideopsella gelatinosa and Meliolina memecyli.

== Vernacular names ==
- cherry (Australian English)
- 少花谷木, shao hua gu mu (Standard Chinese)

== Uses ==
In the traditional medicine of the Kuuku I’yu (Northern Kaanju) or Kaanichi Pama, the people of the inland highlands of central Cape York Peninsula, northeast Australia, the plant is used to treat skin infections and inflammations. Enzyme inhibitory activity, antiglycation activity and antioxidant activity of the species leaf extract was assessed and found not to be significant.

The Karen people of northern and western Thailand use the species in their ethnomedicine. A decoction of the leaves is drunk as treatment for muscle pain.
