= Warneckea memecyloides =

Conservation status
- Vulnerable (IUCN 2.3)

Scientific classification
- Kingdom: Plantae
- Clade: Tracheophytes
- Clade: Angiosperms
- Clade: Eudicots
- Clade: Rosids
- Order: Myrtales
- Family: Melastomataceae
- Genus: Warneckea
- Species: W. memecyloides

Binomial name
- Warneckea memecyloides (Benth.) H.Jacques-Felix

Species of flowering plant

Warneckea memecyloides is a species of plant in the family Melastomataceae. It is found in Cameroon, Ivory Coast, Gabon, Ghana, and Nigeria. It is threatened by habitat loss.
