= Memecylon cerasiforme =

Scientific classification
- Kingdom: Plantae
- Clade: Tracheophytes
- Clade: Angiosperms
- Clade: Eudicots
- Clade: Rosids
- Order: Myrtales
- Family: Melastomataceae
- Genus: Memecylon
- Species: M. cerasiforme

Binomial name
- Memecylon cerasiforme Kurz

Species of flowering plant

Memecylon cerasiforme is a species of flowering plant in the family Melastomataceae. It is native to India (Chittagong, North East India), Burma, Bangladesh.
