= Memecylon cinereum =

Conservation status
- Data Deficient (IUCN 3.1)

Scientific classification
- Kingdom: Plantae
- Clade: Tracheophytes
- Clade: Angiosperms
- Clade: Eudicots
- Clade: Rosids
- Order: Myrtales
- Family: Melastomataceae
- Genus: Memecylon
- Species: M. cinereum

Binomial name
- Memecylon cinereum King

Species of flowering plant

Memecylon cinereum is a species of plant in the family Melastomataceae. It is found in Malaysia and Singapore. It is threatened by habitat loss.
