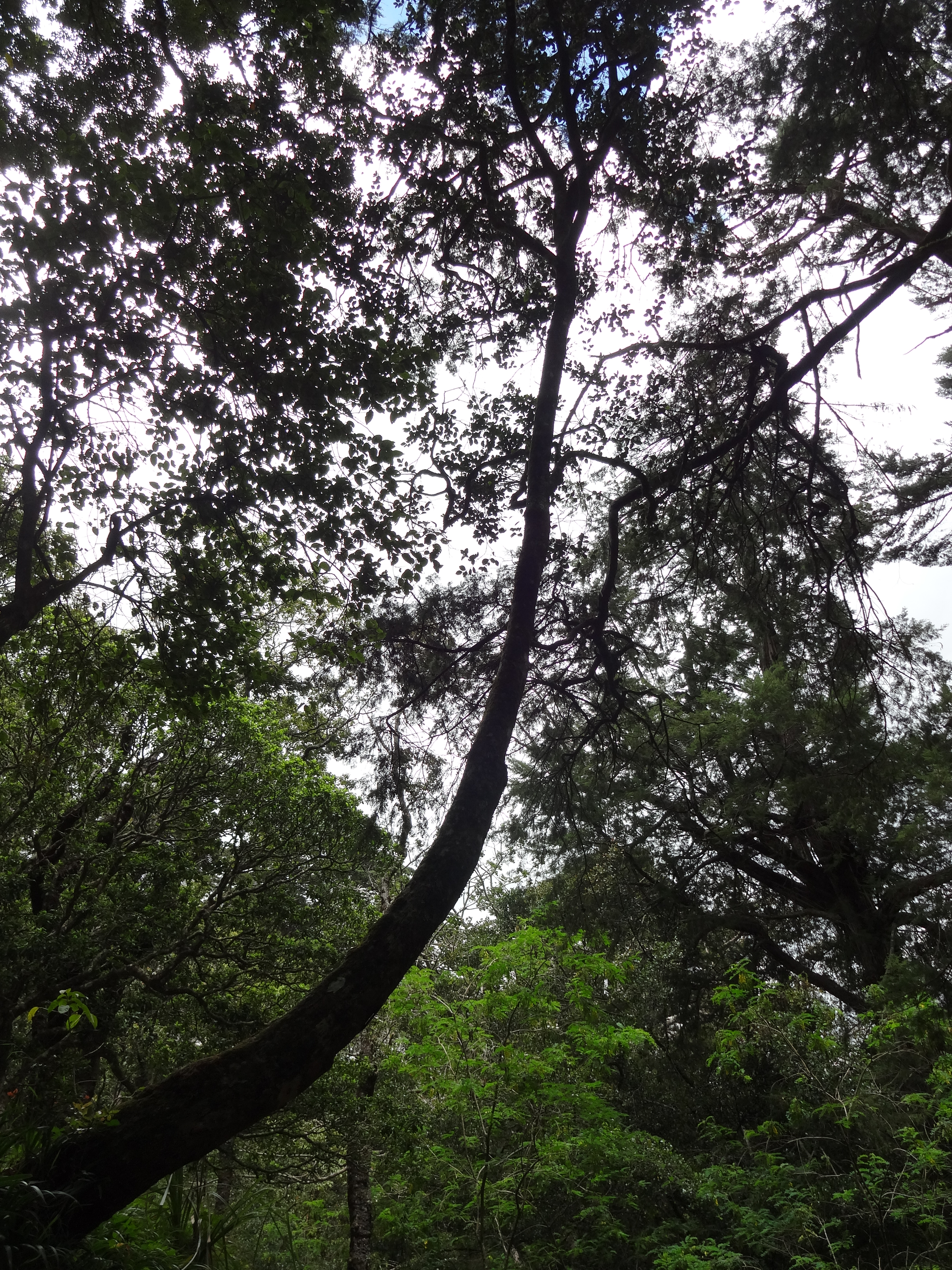
- Memecylon parvifolium in Hakgale Botanical Garden

Scientific classification
- Kingdom: Plantae
- Clade: Embryophytes
- Clade: Tracheophytes
- Clade: Spermatophytes
- Clade: Angiosperms
- Clade: Eudicots
- Clade: Rosids
- Order: Myrtales
- Family: Melastomataceae
- Genus: Memecylon
- Species: M. parvifolium

Binomial name
- Memecylon parvifolium Thwaites

= Memecylon parvifolium =

Species of flowering plant

Memecylon parvifolium is a species of plant in the family Melastomataceae. It is endemic to Sri Lanka.

== Leaves ==
Broadly obovate, base tapering, obtuse to rounded apex, veins invisible; dark green, shiny above; young flush reddish.

== Trunk ==
Bark - gray, finely cracked; Wood - yellow, hard, heavy; twigs quadrangular.

== Flowers ==
White to pinkish red, few, small, nearly sessile.

== Fruits ==
Black berry, tipped with calyx.

== Ecology ==
Montane forest subcanopy.
