= Memecylon floridum =

Conservation status
- Vulnerable (IUCN 2.3)

Scientific classification
- Kingdom: Plantae
- Clade: Tracheophytes
- Clade: Angiosperms
- Clade: Eudicots
- Clade: Rosids
- Order: Myrtales
- Family: Melastomataceae
- Genus: Memecylon
- Species: M. floridum

Binomial name
- Memecylon floridum Ridley

Species of flowering plant

Memecylon floridum is a species of plant in the Myrtales order family Melastomataceae. It is found in Peninsular Malaysia and Singapore. It is threatened by habitat loss.
