= Memecylon elaeagni =

Conservation status
- Least Concern (IUCN 3.1)

Scientific classification
- Kingdom: Plantae
- Clade: Tracheophytes
- Clade: Angiosperms
- Clade: Eudicots
- Clade: Rosids
- Order: Myrtales
- Family: Melastomataceae
- Genus: Memecylon
- Species: M. elaeagni

Binomial name
- Memecylon elaeagni Blume

Species of flowering plant

Memecylon elaeagni is a species of plant in the family Melastomataceae. It is endemic to Seychelles.
