= Memecylon macrocarpum =

Conservation status
- Vulnerable (IUCN 2.3)

Scientific classification
- Kingdom: Plantae
- Clade: Embryophytes
- Clade: Tracheophytes
- Clade: Spermatophytes
- Clade: Angiosperms
- Clade: Eudicots
- Clade: Rosids
- Order: Myrtales
- Family: Melastomataceae
- Genus: Memecylon
- Species: M. macrocarpum

Binomial name
- Memecylon macrocarpum Thwaites

Species of flowering plant

Memecylon macrocarpum is a species of plant in the family Melastomataceae. It is native to Sri Lanka and SW India.
