= Memecylon revolutum =

Conservation status
- Endangered (IUCN 2.3)

Scientific classification
- Kingdom: Plantae
- Clade: Tracheophytes
- Clade: Angiosperms
- Clade: Eudicots
- Clade: Rosids
- Order: Myrtales
- Family: Melastomataceae
- Genus: Memecylon
- Species: M. revolutum

Binomial name
- Memecylon revolutum Thwaites

Species of flowering plant

Memecylon revolutum is a species of plant in the family Melastomataceae. It is endemic to Sri Lanka.
