= Memecylon caeruleum =

Scientific classification
- Kingdom: Plantae
- Clade: Tracheophytes
- Clade: Angiosperms
- Clade: Eudicots
- Clade: Rosids
- Order: Myrtales
- Family: Melastomataceae
- Genus: Memecylon
- Species: M. caeruleum

Binomial name
- Memecylon caeruleum Jack

Synonyms
- Memecylon cordatum Wall.; Memecylon cyanocarpum C.Y.Wu; Memecylon diversifolium C.Presl; Memecylon floribundum Blume; Memecylon laurifolium Naudin; Memecylon lutescens C.Presl; Memecylon manillanum Naudin; Memecylon tinctorium Blume

Species of tree native to Asia

Memecylon caeruleum is a shrub or tree species in the Melastomataceae family. It is found from New Guinea, west through Southeast Asia to Tibet, China. It has become an invasive weed in the Seychelles. It has some local use for wood and food.

== Description ==
Growing as a shrub or as a tree, with a heights typically of 1–6 m (3.3–19.7 ft) but occasionally 12 m (39 ft) tall, the species has a smooth-barked (glabrous) circular/terete trunk. The leathery leaves are oblong to elliptic in shape, some 8-11(-16) x 3.8-6(-7.5) cm in size. Flower petals are white to yellowish green, with blue stamens. The smooth egg-shaped (obovoid) fruit are pink to dark red when immature, becoming purple to black when mature, some 1–1.5 cm (0.4–0.6 in) in diameter, with a succulent juicy exocarp. Flowering occurs from April to August, fruit in December and January. The colour and size of the fruit are seen as diagnostic of the species in Zhōngguó/China. In Cambodia, the species flowers in July, fruits from October to May.

This species has been identified as being in a clade with Memecylon cantleyi, which grows in Borneo, Sumatera, Peninsular Malaysia and Thailand. As well these two species belong to a deeper Malesian/Southeast Asian clade that includes Memecylon lilacinum, Memecylon pauciflorum, Memecylon plebujum, and Memecylon scutellatum.

== Distribution ==
The species grows as a native in an area from New Guinea, across Malesia to parts of Zhōngguó/China. Countries and regions in which it has been recorded as native are: Papua New Guinea (mainland); Indonesia (Western New Guinea/West Papua, Maluku, Sulawesi, Kalimantan, Jawa, Sumatera); Philippines; Malaysia (Sabah, Sarawak, Peninsular Malaysia); Singapore; Cambodia; Vietnam; Laos; Zhōngguó/China (Hainan, Yunnan, Tibet); Myanmar; and India (Andaman Islands, Nicobar Islands). It has also been introduced to the Seychelles.

== Habitat, ecology ==
The plant grows in secondary formation in Southeast Asia. In China it is recorded as occurring in sparse (open forest) to dense (closed) forests, some 900–1,200 m (3,000–3,900 ft) elevation.

Mount Malindang is a volcano on the island of Mindanao, Philippines. In secondary forests on the slopes, at around 1650m elevation, the tree is described as rare but common in patches by local assessors, while it is described as economically important by assessors from the Philippine National Museum.

On the slopes of the volcano Nglanggeran, Gunung Kidul Regency, Indonesia, the shrub dominates forests on dry soils, and is commonly associated with Ardisia javanica, Pavetta species, Melastoma malabathricum and Psychotria species.

The tree/treelet, as it is described, grows along the Mekong river in Kratie and Steung Treng Provinces, Cambodia. It occurs in riverine strand, bamboo and deciduous forest, and mixed evergreen and deciduous forest communities, on both metamorphic and shale derived sediments at elevations of 20 to 30 m (66 to 98 ft).

On the island of Mahé, Seychelles, the non-native plant was first recorded in 1931. Since then it has expanded to cover a considerable area and has traveled to the nearby island of Praslin. It produces dense shade and the floral community associated with it has low diversity. The fauna community that inhabit the shrub-infested areas are mainly cosmopolitan taxa, the most abundant being the Technomyrmex albipes-Icerya seychellarum association (ants and coccoid bugs/scale insects, in the immature fruit). The shrub is a significant threat in degraded habitats.

Several species of leaf-cutting bee in Singapore, Megachile laticeps and Megachile disjuncta, were observed collecting pollen from the plant.

== Vernacular names ==
Common names for the tree include:

- balikoko (local name, Mount Malindang, Mindanao)
- Javanes kulis (official name, Philippines, Filipino)
- plô:ng ka-èk (plô:ng/phlô:ng=standard name for shrubs of this genus, ka-èk=raven), pho:ng kach (Khmer)
- phlorng (Kuy and/or Khmer speakers in north-central Cambodia)
- 天蓝谷木, tian lan gu mu (Standard Chinese).

== Uses ==
The trunks of the shrub are used for firewood in Cambodia. Amongst Kuy- and Khmer-speaking people living in the same villages in Stung Treng and Preah Vihear provinces of north-central Cambodia, the tree is used as a source of wood. The leaves or young shoots, and the fruit are recorded as being eaten by local people in the Andaman and Nicobar Islands of India.

== History ==
William Jack (1795–1822), a Scottish botanist, prolific in describing taxa, but dying young in the tropics, described this species in 1820, in the periodical Malayan Miscellanies, (Bencoolen (now Bengkulu).
