= Warneckea cordiformis =

Conservation status
- Critically Endangered (IUCN 3.1)

Scientific classification
- Kingdom: Plantae
- Clade: Tracheophytes
- Clade: Angiosperms
- Clade: Eudicots
- Clade: Rosids
- Order: Myrtales
- Family: Melastomataceae
- Genus: Warneckea
- Species: W. cordiformis

Binomial name
- Warneckea cordiformis Stone

Species of flowering plant

Warneckea cordiformis is a species of plant in the family Melastomataceae. The species is found in Mozambique, and is currently Critically endangered due to the bisection of Namacubi Forest.
