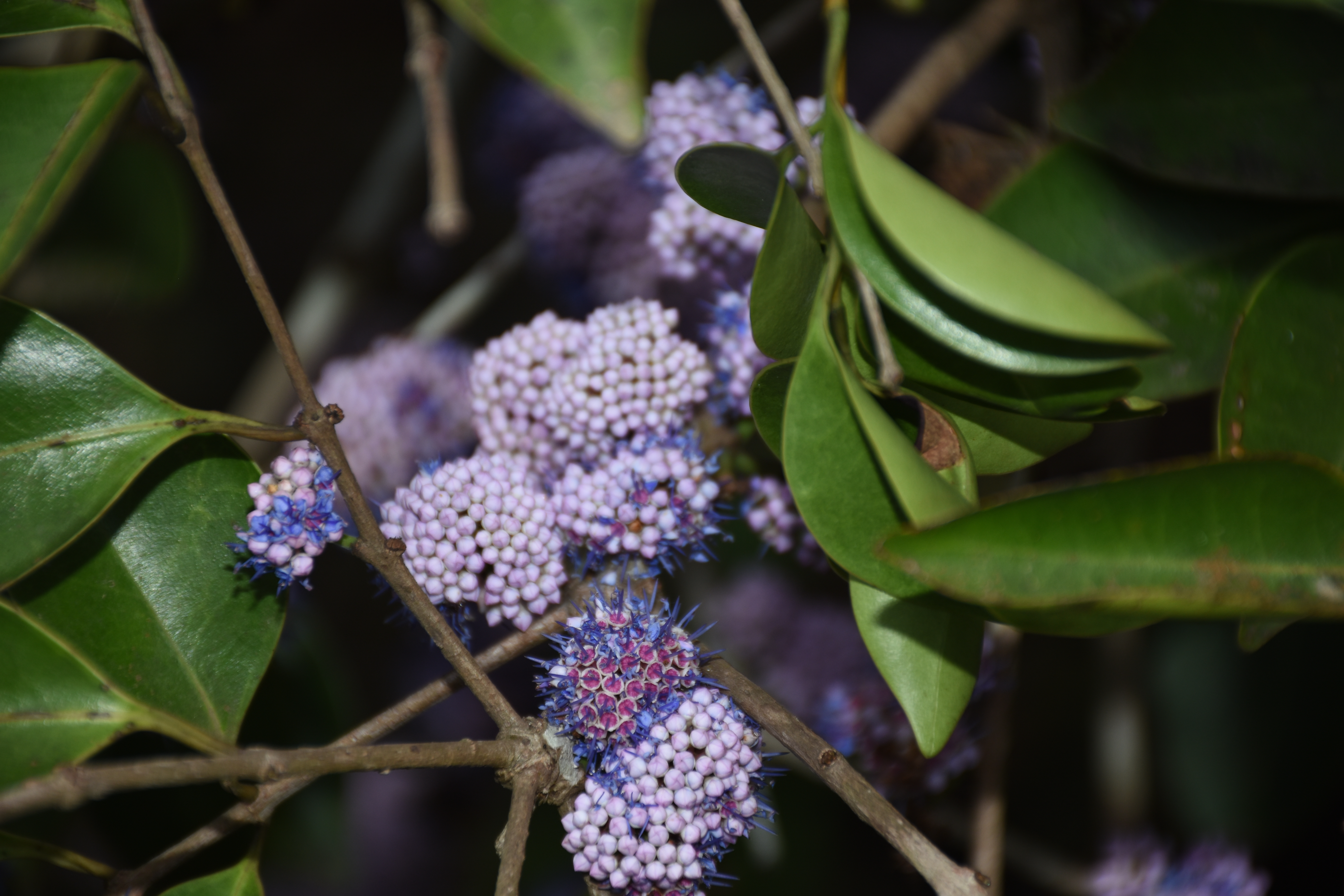

Conservation status
- Vulnerable (IUCN 2.3)

Scientific classification
- Kingdom: Plantae
- Clade: Tracheophytes
- Clade: Angiosperms
- Clade: Eudicots
- Clade: Rosids
- Order: Myrtales
- Family: Melastomataceae
- Genus: Memecylon
- Species: M. grande

Binomial name
- Memecylon grande Retz.

= Memecylon grande =

Species of shrub

Memecylon grande is a species of plant in the family Melastomataceae seen in Indo-Malesia. It is a shrub or small tree with ovate leaves, blue flowers and fruits are berries.
