= Memecylon tirunelvelicum =

Scientific classification
- Kingdom: Plantae
- Clade: Tracheophytes
- Clade: Angiosperms
- Clade: Eudicots
- Clade: Rosids
- Order: Myrtales
- Family: Melastomataceae
- Genus: Memecylon
- Species: M. tirunelvelicum

Binomial name
- Memecylon tirunelvelicum Murugan, Manickam & Sundaresan

Species of flowering plant

Memecylon tirunelvelicum is a plant species endemic to the Tinurelveli Hills in Tamil Nadu, India. It is known from only 3 localities in the Western Ghat Mountains, at elevations of 900–1100 m.

Memecylon tirunelvelicum is a tree up to 4 m tall. Leaves are opposite, ovate to lanceolate, pointed at the tip, up to 9 cm long. Flowers are blue, about 1 cm in diameter.
