= Lijndenia barteri =

Conservation status
- Vulnerable (IUCN 2.3)

Scientific classification
- Kingdom: Plantae
- Clade: Tracheophytes
- Clade: Angiosperms
- Clade: Eudicots
- Clade: Rosids
- Order: Myrtales
- Family: Melastomataceae
- Genus: Lijndenia
- Species: L. barteri

Binomial name
- Lijndenia barteri (Hook.f.) K.Bremer

Synonyms
- Spathandra barteri Memecylon barteri Memecylon dinklagei Memecylon pynaertii

Species of shrub

Lijndenia barteri (synonyms: Spathandra barteri, Memecylon dinklagei, Memecylon pynaertii, and basionym Memecylon barteri) is a species of shrub in the family Melastomataceae. It is endemic to lowland Upper Guinean forests of West Africa. It is threatened by habitat loss.
