= Memecylon urceolatum =

Conservation status
- Vulnerable (IUCN 2.3)

Scientific classification
- Kingdom: Plantae
- Clade: Tracheophytes
- Clade: Angiosperms
- Clade: Eudicots
- Clade: Rosids
- Order: Myrtales
- Family: Melastomataceae
- Genus: Memecylon
- Species: M. urceolatum

Binomial name
- Memecylon urceolatum Cogn.

Synonyms
- Memecylon edule var. thwaitesii C.B.Clarke; Memecylon umbellatum var. thwaitesii (C.B.Clarke) Trimen

Species of flowering plant

Memecylon urceolatum is a species of plant in the family Melastomataceae. It is endemic to Sri Lanka.
