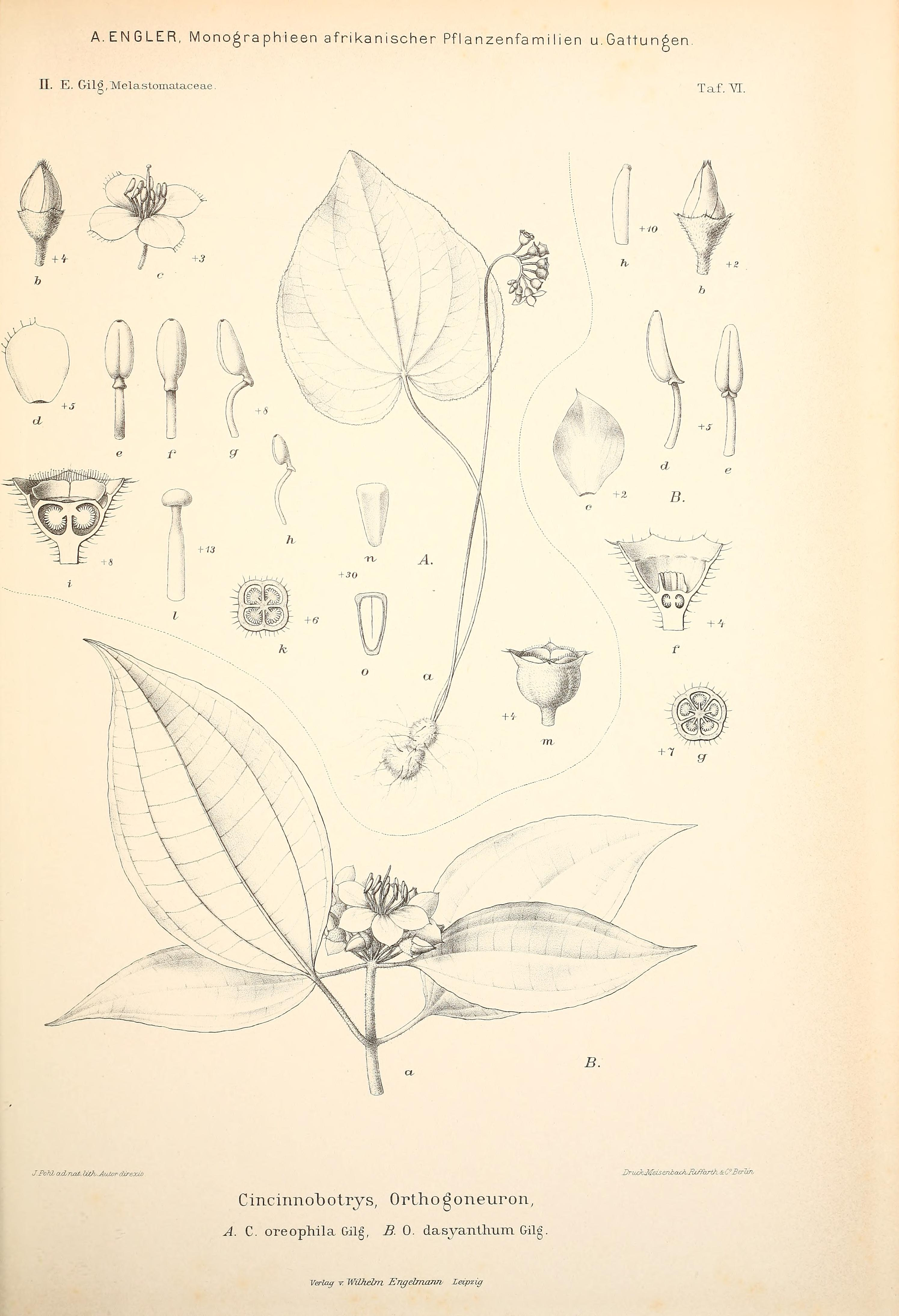
- Figure B

Conservation status
- Vulnerable (IUCN 3.1)

Scientific classification
- Kingdom: Plantae
- Clade: Tracheophytes
- Clade: Angiosperms
- Clade: Eudicots
- Clade: Rosids
- Order: Myrtales
- Family: Melastomataceae
- Genus: Memecylon
- Species: M. dasyanthum

Binomial name
- Memecylon dasyanthum Gilg & Ledermann ex Engl.

Synonyms
- Orthogoneuron dasyanthum Gilg

= Memecylon dasyanthum =

Species of flowering plant

Memecylon dasyanthum is a species of plant in the family Melastomataceae. It is endemic to Cameroon. Its natural habitat is subtropical or tropical moist montane forests. It is threatened by habitat loss.
