= Memecylon kunstleri =

Conservation status
- Vulnerable (IUCN 2.3)

Scientific classification
- Kingdom: Plantae
- Clade: Tracheophytes
- Clade: Angiosperms
- Clade: Eudicots
- Clade: Rosids
- Order: Myrtales
- Family: Melastomataceae
- Genus: Memecylon
- Species: M. kunstleri

Binomial name
- Memecylon kunstleri King

Species of tree

Memecylon kunstleri is a species of flowering plant in the family Melastomataceae. It is a tree endemic to Peninsular Malaysia. It is threatened by habitat loss.
