= Memecylon angustifolium =

Scientific classification
- Kingdom: Plantae
- Clade: Tracheophytes
- Clade: Angiosperms
- Clade: Eudicots
- Clade: Rosids
- Order: Myrtales
- Family: Melastomataceae
- Genus: Memecylon
- Species: M. angustifolium

Binomial name
- Memecylon angustifolium Wight

Species of flowering plant

Memecylon angustifolium, or blue mist, is a species of plant in the family Melastomataceae. It is native to India and Sri Lanka. Leaves are simple, opposite, decussate; lamina narrow linear-elliptic to linear-lanceolate; apex acute, base attenuate, with entire margin. Flowers are blue in color and show axillary umbels inflorescence. Fruit is a blackish purple, one-seeded berry.

The plant is known as "Aattukanala" in Malayanam language, and as "kora kaha - කොර කහ" in Sinhala language.
