= Warneckea wildeana =

Conservation status
- Endangered (IUCN 3.1)

Scientific classification
- Kingdom: Plantae
- Clade: Tracheophytes
- Clade: Angiosperms
- Clade: Eudicots
- Clade: Rosids
- Order: Myrtales
- Family: Melastomataceae
- Genus: Warneckea
- Species: W. wildeana

Binomial name
- Warneckea wildeana Jacq.-Fel.

Species of flowering plant

Warneckea wildeana is a species of plant in the family Melastomataceae. It is found in Cameroon and Gabon.
