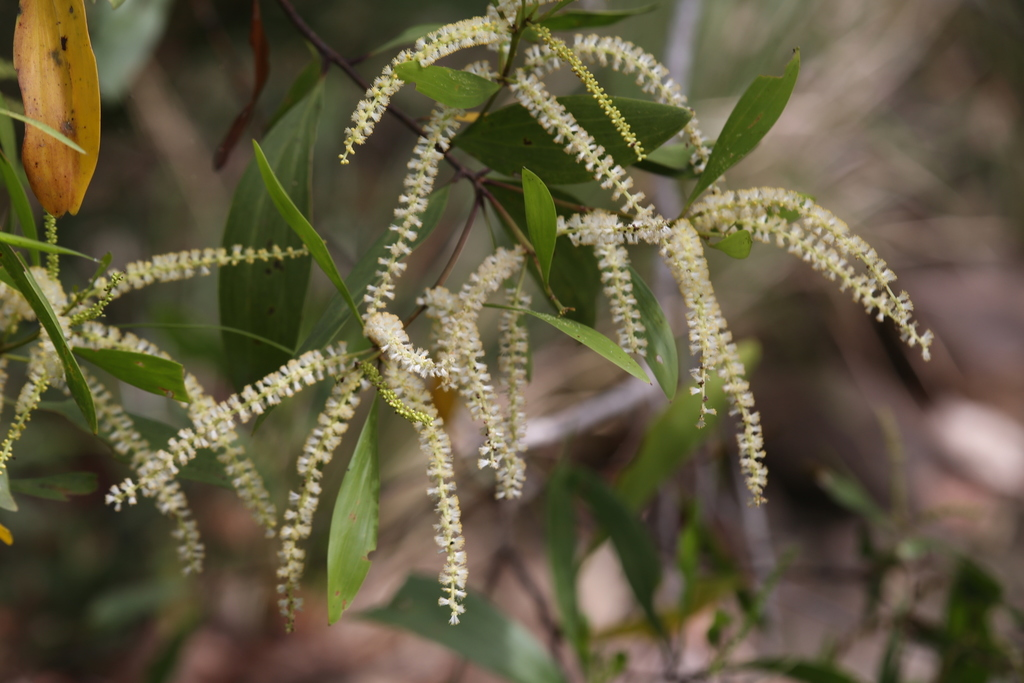
- Near Koah

Scientific classification
- Kingdom: Plantae
- Clade: Embryophytes
- Clade: Tracheophytes
- Clade: Spermatophytes
- Clade: Angiosperms
- Clade: Eudicots
- Clade: Rosids
- Order: Fabales
- Family: Fabaceae
- Subfamily: Caesalpinioideae
- Clade: Mimosoid clade
- Genus: Acacia
- Species: A. polystachya

Binomial name
- Acacia polystachya A.Cunn. ex. Benth.
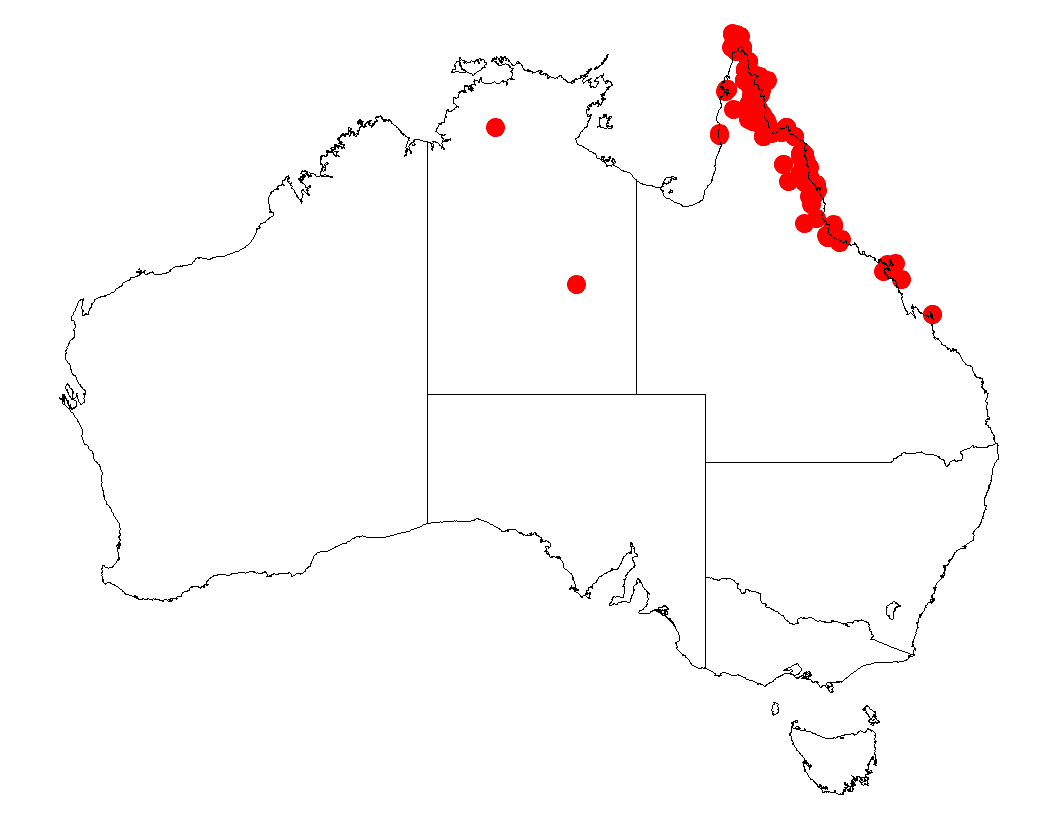
- Occurrence data from AVH

= Acacia polystachya =

Species of legume

Acacia polystachya is a tree belonging to the genus Acacia and the subgenus Juliflorae that is native to north eastern Australia.

== Description ==
The tree typically grows to a height of 3 to 25 m (9.8 to 82.0 ft) and has dark brown to grey coloured bark that is smooth of corrugated. It has smooth to pustular, flattened or angular branchlets that are grey, brown or purplish in colour. Like most species of Acacia it has phyllodes rather than true leaves. The narrowly elliptic phyllodes are sometimes asymmetrical and straight to sickle shaped. The glabrous and chartaceous phyllodes are 7.5 to 25 cm (3.0 to 9.8 in) in length and 10 to 32 mm (0.39 to 1.26 in) and have two to three prominent nerves. It blooms between April and July producing yellow flowers. The flower-spikes are 3.5 to 7.5 cm (1.4 to 3.0 in) in length and are loosely arranged with bands of pale yellow flowers. The thinly coriaceous blackish seed pods that form after flowering have a linear shape and are straight-sided to slightly and often constricted between seeds and covered in a powdery white coating. The glabrous pods can be strongly curved and irregularly twisted with a length of 8.3 to 13 cm (3.3 to 5.1 in) and 6 to 10 mm (0.24 to 0.39 in). The black and slightly pitted seeds inside the pods are arranged longitudinally and have a discoid shape with a length of 3.5 to 4.2 mm (0.14 to 0.17 in) with a yellow funicle surrounding it.

== Taxonomy ==
The species was first formally described by the botanist Allan Cunningham in 1842 as part of William Jackson Hooker's work Notes on Mimoseae, with a synopsis of species published in the London Journal of Botany. It was reclassified by Leslie Pedley in 1987 as Racosperma polystachyum then transferred back to genus Acacia in 2001.

== Distribution ==
It is endemic to the parts of far north and northern Queensland in areas along the east coast. The northern range of the tree extends as far north as Banks Island in the Torres Strait down to along the eastern side of Cape York Peninsula to around Cairns in the south and has also been found on Palm Island. It is found along beaches and creeks and rivers where it grows in alluvial soils often as a part of vine thicket communities.

== See also ==
- List of Acacia species
