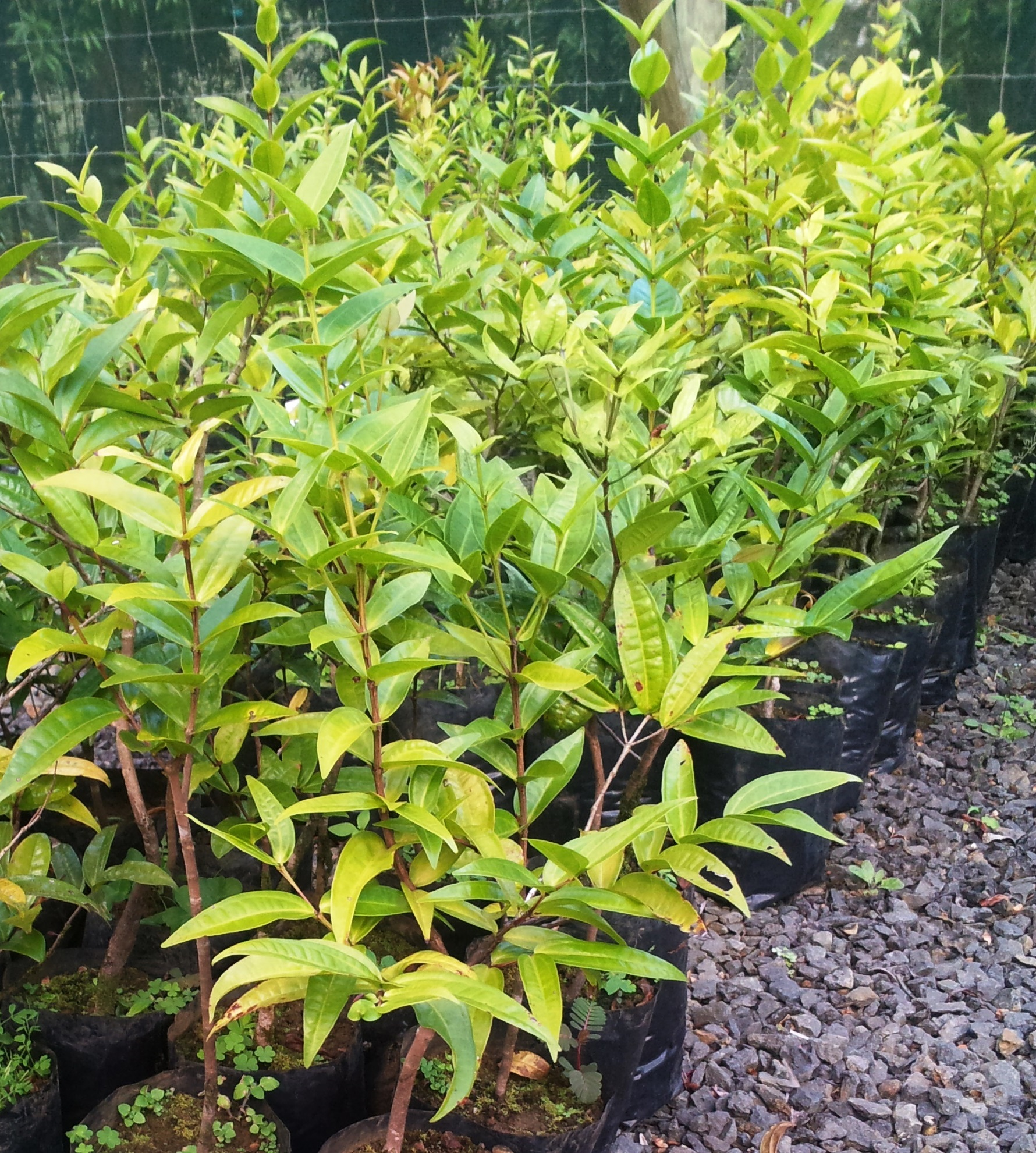
- Warneckea trinervis

Scientific classification
- Kingdom: Plantae
- Clade: Tracheophytes
- Clade: Angiosperms
- Clade: Eudicots
- Clade: Rosids
- Order: Myrtales
- Family: Melastomataceae
- Genus: Warneckea; Gilg

= Warneckea =

Genus of flowering plants

Warneckea is a genus of plants in family Melastomataceae.

The genus was named after German botanical collector Otto Warnecke.

== Species ==
- Warneckea acutifolia (De Wild.) Jacq.-Fél.
- Warneckea albiflora R.D.Stone & N.P.Tenza
- Warneckea amaniensis Gilg
- Warneckea anomala (H.Perrier) Jacq.-Fél.
- Warneckea atrovirens Jacq.-Fél.
- Warneckea austro-occidentalis R.D.Stone
- Warneckea bebaiensis (Gilg ex Engl.) Jacq.-Fél.
- Warneckea bequaertii (De Wild.) Jacq.-Fél.
- Warneckea bullata Jacq.-Fél.
- Warneckea cauliflora Jacq.-Fél.
- Warneckea cinnamomoides (G.Don) Jacq.-Fél.
- Warneckea congolensis (A.Fern. & R.Fern.) Jacq.-Fél.
- Warneckea cordiformis R.D.Stone
- Warneckea erubescens (Gilg) Jacq.-Fél.
- Warneckea fascicularis (Planch. ex Benth.) Jacq.-Fél.
- Warneckea floribunda Jacq.-Fél.
- Warneckea fosteri (Hutch. & Dalziel) Jacq.-Fél.
- Warneckea gilletii (De Wild.) Jacq.-Fél.
- Warneckea golaensis (Baker f.) Jacq.-Fél.
- Warneckea guineensis (Keay) Jacq.-Fél.
- Warneckea hedbergiorum Borhidi
- Warneckea jasminoides (Gilg) Jacq.-Fél.
- Warneckea lecomteana Jacq.-Fél.
- Warneckea macrantha Jacq.-Fél.
- Warneckea madagascariensis Jacq.-Fél.
- Warneckea mangrovensis (Jacq.-Fél.) R.D.Stone
- Warneckea masoalae R.D.Stone
- Warneckea melindensis (A.Fern. & R.Fern.) R.D.Stone & Q.Luke
- Warneckea membranifolia (Hook.f.) Jacq.-Fél.
- Warneckea memecyloides (Benth.) Jacq.-Fél.
- Warneckea microphylla (Gilg) Borhidi
- Warneckea mouririfolia (Brenan) Borhidi
- Warneckea ngutiensis R. D. Stone
- Warneckea parvifolia R.D.Stone & Ntetha
- Warneckea peculiaris (H.Perrier) Jacq.-Fél.
- Warneckea pulcherrima (Gilg) Jacq.-Fél.
- Warneckea pulviniflora Jacq.-Fél.
- Warneckea reygaertii (De Wild.) Jacq.-Fél.
- Warneckea sansibarica (Taub.) Jacq.-Fél.
- Warneckea sapinii (De Wild.) Jacq.-Fél.
- Warneckea schliebenii (Markgr.) Jacq.-Fél.
- Warneckea sessilicarpa (A.Fern. & R.Fern.) Jacq.-Fél.
- Warneckea sousae (A.Fern. & R.Fern.) A.E.van Wyk
- Warneckea superba (A.Fern. & R.Fern.) Jacq.-Fél.
- Warneckea trinervis (DC.) Jacq.-Fél.
- Warneckea urschii (H.Perrier) Jacq.-Fél.
- Warneckea walikalensis (A.Fern. & R.Fern.) Jacq.-Fél.
- Warneckea wildeana Jacq.-Fél.
- Warneckea yangambensis (A.Fern. & R.Fern.) Jacq.-Fél.
