= Pternandra =

Scientific classification
- Kingdom: Plantae
- Clade: Embryophytes
- Clade: Tracheophytes
- Clade: Angiosperms
- Clade: Eudicots
- Clade: Rosids
- Order: Myrtales
- Family: Melastomataceae
- Genus: Pternandra; Jack

Type species
- Pternandra coerulescens Jack

Synonyms
- Apteuxis Griff.; Ewyckia Blume; Kibessia DC.; Macroplacis Blume; Rectomitra Blume

Genus of trees

Pternandra is a genus of trees in the Melastomataceae family. There are 17 species in the taxa. It is native to an area from northern Australia through Southeast Asia to Hainan, Zhōngguó/China and India. The botanist William Jack who named the taxa, died at 27 years of age, the year his description was published.

== Description ==
The plants of this genus grow as trees or sometimes as shrubs. The leaves have 3–5 veins and a generally short petiole. The terminal or axillary inflorescences can be umbellate, cymose, paniculate or of almost sessile clusters, the flowers are rarely solitary, and have small, paired connate bracts and bracteoles. Flowers come in groups of 4. Campanulate hypanthium has an outside pattern of plates or setose appendages. Fairly indistinct calyx lobes are either short teeth or not present, but generally persistent in the fruit. Broadly ovate to suborbicular petals can be white, yellow, blue or purple. There are 8 isomorphic stamens. The dolabriform to oblong anthers have lateral slits, with the connective mostly distinctly thickened, not prolonged and have at the most a small and calcarate dorsal appendage with no ventral appendage. Quadrilocular ovary, with glabrous summit and numerous ovules on parietal placentas. Filiform style. Fleshy indehiscent fruit. Numerous small seeds that are cuneate and minutely tuberculate.

== Taxonomy ==
The name derives from the Ancient Greek words pterna ('heel'), and andros ('male'), referring to the anther connective's heel-like thickening.

The type species of the genus is Pternandra coerulescens.

The genus was named by the Scots doctor and botanist William Jack (1795–1822) in 1822. He had obtained an M.A. when 16, was admitted to the Royal College of Surgeons of England when 17. By 23 years of age, he was in Sumatera. He died at then Bencoolen (now Bengkulu, Sumatera, when 27 years of age in 1822, the same year his description of this taxa was published in Malayan Miscellanies (Bencoolen)

== Distribution ==
The plants are native to an area from Northern Australia, through Malesia and Southeast Asia to Hainan, Zhōngguó/China and India. Countries and regions that the taxa grows in are: Australia (Queensland, Northern Territory); Papua Niugini (eastern New Guinea); Indonesia (West Papua, Maluku Islands, Kalimantan, Jawa, Sumatera); Malaysia (Sabah, Sarawak, Peninsular Malaysia); Thailand; Cambodia; Vietnam; Zhōngguó/China (Hainan); Myanmar; India (including Nicobar Islands).

== Species ==
As of April 2021, there are 17 accepted species of Pternandra:

- Pternandra angustifolia J.F.Maxwell
- Pternandra azurea (DC.) Burkill
- Pternandra coerulescens Jack
- Pternandra cogniauxii M.P.Nayar
- Pternandra coriacea (Cogn.) M.P.Nayar
- Pternandra crassicalyx J.F.Maxwell
- Pternandra echinata Jack
- Pternandra galeata Ridl.
- Pternandra gracilis (Cogn.) M.P.Nayar
- Pternandra hirtella (Cogn.) M.P.Nayar
- Pternandra ledermannii (Mansf.) M.P.Nayar
- Pternandra moluccana M.P.Nayar
- Pternandra multiflora Cogn.
- Pternandra rostrata (Cogn.) M.P.Nayar
- Pternandra tesellata (Stapf) M.P.Nayar
- Pternandra teysmanniana (Cogn.) M.P.Nayar
- Pternandra tuberculata (Korth.) M.P.Nayar
