= Memecylon cantleyi =

Scientific classification
- Kingdom: Plantae
- Clade: Tracheophytes
- Clade: Angiosperms
- Clade: Eudicots
- Clade: Rosids
- Order: Myrtales
- Family: Melastomataceae
- Genus: Memecylon
- Species: M. cantleyi

Binomial name
- Memecylon cantleyi Ridl.

Synonyms
- Memecylon dissitum Craib; Memecylon steenisii Bakh.f.

Species of tree in the Melastomataceae family

Memecylon cantleyi is a shrub or tree species in the Melastomataceae family. The flowers are white and vivid blue. The plant is native to an area from Borneo to Sumatra to Thailand. A name given to the tree in Malaysia, nipis kulit, translates as "calamondin bark".

== Taxonomy ==
This species has been identified by molecular phylogenetics as being in a clade with Memecylon caeruleum, which grows from New Guinea through Southeast Asia to Tibet, Zhōngguó/China. As well these two species belong to a deeper Malesian/Southeast Asian clade that includes Memecylon lilacinum, Memecylon pauciflorum, Memecylon plebujum, and Memecylon scutellatum.

The species was named by the English botanist, geologist and naturalist Henry Nicholas Ridley (1855-1956), in 1918. Ridley lived for 20 years in Singapore, and worked extensively on the botany of then British Malaya. He described the plant in the Journal of the Straits Branch of the Royal Asiatic Society (Singapore).

== Description ==
A small tree (up to 15m), with white calyces and vivid blue petals and filaments.

== Distribution ==
The species is native to an area of Southeast Asia, from Borneo to Thailand. Countries and regions that it grows in are: Indonesia (Kalimantan, Sumatera {Simeulue}); Malaysia (Sabah, Sarawak, Peninsular Malaysia); Brunei Darussalam; Singapore; Thailand.

== Habitat, ecology ==
An understorey tree.

The tree is recorded in Brunei Darussalam as growing in the Temburong District at 180m altitude in mixed dipterocarp forest.

In 2009, the plant was described as critically endangered in Singapore.

In Singapore in 2014 the sole population of this species in Singapore was the same population in the Gardens Jungle that the botanist Ridley used to name the species in 1918 (see #Taxonomy).

In a study published in 2019, this taxa was identified in Bukit Timah Nature Reserve in Singapore. It was only found in primary forest, no individuals were identified in old- or maturing-secondary forest (the maturing-secondary forest was 56 years old).

A lichen of the leaf dwelling genus Byssoloma, Byssoloma leucoblepharum is recorded as growing on the plant in Singapore.

The dominant trees in the forest on the lower slopes (250-300m) of Gunung Ledang National Park, Johor, Malaysia, are Dipterocarpaceae, with multiple species of Dipterocarpus and Shorea. M. cantleyi is one of the small trees of this forest.

The vegetation surrounding Tasik Bera, Pahang, Malaysia is a lowland (35-80m) dipterocarp forest, with this tree present, growing up to 15m.

On Pulau Langkawi, Malaysia, the main mountain range is Machinchang, of a sandstone and conglomerate formation. On the slopes of this range, M. cantleyi occurs from 200m to 660m altitude. In the lower slopes, the seasonally dry rainforest is dominated by a Syzygium-Swintonia association with a canopy up to 25m. From 630m the now stunted forest (canopy at 5m height) was a Syzygium-Orchidaceae association, with M. cantleyi one of the dominant taxa.

== Vernacular names ==
- nipis kulit (nipis="citron", kulit="bark" Malaysian language, note, at least four other Memecylon species share this name)
