= Lijndenia greenwayi =

Conservation status
- Vulnerable (IUCN 2.3)

Scientific classification
- Kingdom: Plantae
- Clade: Tracheophytes
- Clade: Angiosperms
- Clade: Eudicots
- Clade: Rosids
- Order: Myrtales
- Family: Melastomataceae
- Genus: Lijndenia
- Species: L. greenwayi

Binomial name
- Lijndenia greenwayi (Brenan) Borhidi

Synonyms
- Memecylon greenwayi Brenan

Species of flowering plant

Lijndenia greenwayi is a species of plant in the family Melastomataceae. It is endemic to Tanzania.
