= Memecylon capitellatum =

Scientific classification
- Kingdom: Plantae
- Clade: Tracheophytes
- Clade: Angiosperms
- Clade: Eudicots
- Clade: Rosids
- Order: Myrtales
- Family: Melastomataceae
- Genus: Memecylon
- Species: M. capitellatum

Binomial name
- Memecylon capitellatum L.

Synonyms
- Memecylon edule var. capitellatum (L.) C.B. Clarke; Memecylon capitellatum var. salicifolium Blume; Memecylon edule var. rottlerianum C.B. Clarke; Memecylon edule var. laetum C.B. Clarke; Memecylon walkeri Hook. ex C.B. Clarke

Species of flowering plant

Memecylon capitellatum is a species of plant in the family Melastomataceae. It is endemic to Sri Lanka. It is known as "weli kaha - වැලි කහ" by local Sinhalese people.

== Uses ==
leaves, stem- medicinal; Wood - tool handles.

== Sources ==
- http://www.theplantlist.org/tpl1.1/record/tro-20305366
- http://linnean-online.org/41196/
- http://www.mpnet.iora-rcstt.org/node/3195
