= Lijndenia capitellata =

Scientific classification
- Kingdom: Plantae
- Clade: Tracheophytes
- Clade: Angiosperms
- Clade: Eudicots
- Clade: Rosids
- Order: Myrtales
- Family: Melastomataceae
- Genus: Lijndenia
- Species: L. capitellata

Binomial name
- Lijndenia capitellata (Arn.) K.Bremer

Species of flowering plant

Lijndenia capitellata is a species of plant in the family Melastomataceae. It is endemic to Sri Lanka. Locally, the plant is known as "pini baru - පිනි බරු" in Sinhala.
