= Lijndenia =

Scientific classification
- Kingdom: Plantae
- Clade: Tracheophytes
- Clade: Angiosperms
- Clade: Eudicots
- Clade: Rosids
- Order: Myrtales
- Family: Melastomataceae
- Genus: Lijndenia; Zoll. & Moritzi

Genus of flowering plants

Lijndenia is a genus of plant in family Melastomataceae. The genus includes 13 species.

Species include:

- Lijndenia barteri K. Bremer
- Lijndenia bequaertii (De Wild.) Borhidi
- Lijndenia brenanii (A. Fern. & R. Fern.) Jacq.-Fél.
- Lijndenia capitellata K. Bremer
- Lijndenia danguyana (H. Perrier) Jacq.-Fél.
- Lijndenia fragrans (A. Fern. & R. Fern.) Borhidi
- Lijndenia greenwayi (Brenan) Borhidi
- Lijndenia jasminoides (Gilg) Borhidi
- Lijndenia lutescens (Naudin) Jacq.-Fél.
- Lijndenia melastomoides (Naudin) Jacq.-Fél.
- Lijndenia procteri (A. Fern. & R. Fern.) Borhidi
- Lijndenia roborea (Naudin) Jacq.-Fél.
- Lijndenia semseii (A. Fern. & R. Fern.) Borhidi
