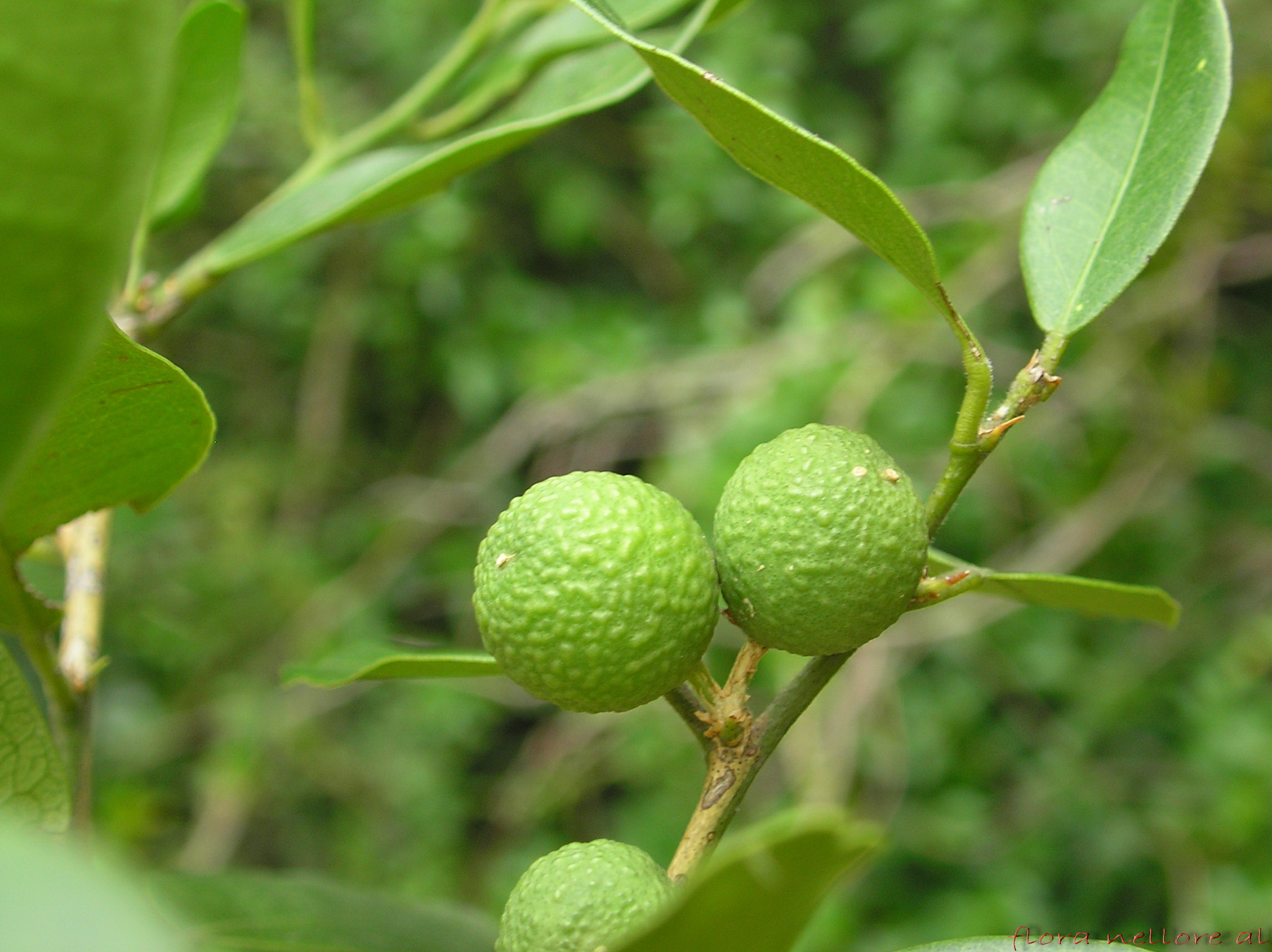

Scientific classification
- Kingdom: Plantae
- Clade: Tracheophytes
- Clade: Angiosperms
- Clade: Eudicots
- Clade: Rosids
- Order: Sapindales
- Family: Rutaceae
- Genus: Atalantia
- Species: A. monophylla

Binomial name
- Atalantia monophylla (Roxb.) A.DC.

Synonyms
- Trichilia spinosa Willd. Sclerostylis spinosa (Willd.) Bl. Merope spinosa M. Roem. Malnerega malabarica Rafin. Limonia spinosa Spreng. Limonia monophylla Roxb. Atalantia spinosa (Willd.) Hook. ex Koorders; Atalantia puberula Miq. Atalantia malabarica (Rafin.) Tanaka; Atalantia floribunda Wight

= Atalantia monophylla =

Species of flowering plant

Atalantia monophylla is a species of plants in the family Rutaceae. They are woody climbers naturally found in tropical regions.

Several species in the genus Atalantia monophylla have been used in traditional medicine, such as the Ayurvedic system from India.
