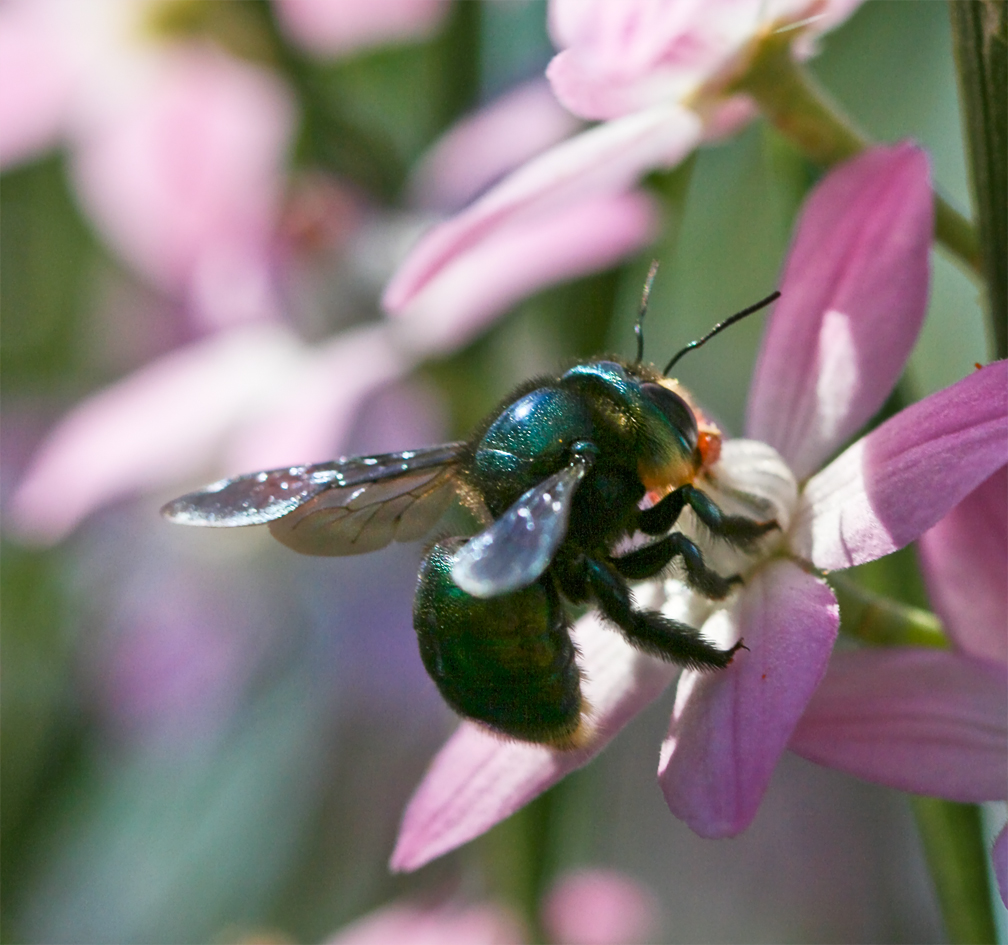
- Female

Scientific classification
- Kingdom: Animalia
- Phylum: Arthropoda
- Clade: Pancrustacea
- Class: Insecta
- Order: Hymenoptera
- Family: Apidae
- Genus: Xylocopa
- Species: X. aerata

Binomial name
- Xylocopa aerata (Smith, 1851)

Synonyms
- Lestis aeratus Smith, 1851

= Xylocopa aerata =

Golden-green carpenter bee

Species of bee

Xylocopa aerata, the golden-green carpenter bee or green carpenter bee, is one of two species of carpenter bee found only in the conservation areas around Sydney, and in the Great Dividing Range in New South Wales in Australia. Its only other habitat as of 2020 is on Kangaroo Island in South Australia. The species is especially vulnerable to fire, and much of its habitat was burnt during the 2019–20 Australian bushfire season.

The bee gets its common name by its habit of burrowing into wood. It is not a social species and does not produce honey, but it is an important pollinator for several species of Australian native plants.

== Description ==
It was originally described by F. Smith in 1851 as Lestis aeratus. Its specific epithet is the Latin adjective aerata, meaning "bronzed".

As its name implies, the golden-green carpenter bee is a metallic green in colour, although it may appear purplish or bluish from some angles. A large stocky bee (at nearly 2 cm (0.79 in), one of the largest native bees in southern Australia), it is often heard by its loud low-pitched buzzing while flying between flowers. The male has yellow face markings. The bee does have a sting which is potentially painful, although no stings have been recorded.

== Distribution and habitat ==
The natural distribution was southeastern New South Wales from Sydney southwards (where it overlaps with X. bombylans), and into Victoria and southeastern South Australia. However, the green carpenter bee went extinct on mainland South Australia in 1906 and in Victoria in 1938. Apart from conservation areas around Sydney, and in the Great Dividing Range, it exists only on the western half of Kangaroo Island in SA.

They can be seen from spring to autumn, commonly feeding at pea flowers of the family Fabaceae, such as Gompholobium species, including Gompholobium latifolium in spring, and Pultenaea tuberculata in autumn. Flowers of Leucopogon and Leptospermum are also visited.

== Behaviour ==
The golden-green carpenter bee nests by hollowing out stalks of grasstrees (Xanthorrhoea), or soft wood such as Banksia, Casuarina, Melaleuca and Leptospermum. The female excavates a tunnel with her jaws and picks up and dumps the wood shavings outside. The hollow can reach 30 cm (12 in) long by 1.1-1.4 cm diameter. Larger pieces of wood may allow for multiple tunnels. Several female bees may use a nest, one breeding and the others guarding. A bee defends the 0.7-1.0 cm wide entrance by blocking it with its abdomen (compare Allodapula). Both male and female bees may overwinter within the tunnels. The tunnels are partitioned into several cells, where the mother bee lays an egg in each accompanied by provisions of nectar and pollen.

== Conservation ==
Habitat clearing and large, intense bushfires led to extinction in some areas. The last green carpenter bee seen in Victoria was in December 1938 in the Grampians, not long before the Black Friday fires of January 1939. Fire destroys the dead wood the bee needs for nesting, and the flowers which it needs all the time.

In 2007 a huge fire destroyed much of the vegetation in Flinders Chase National Park on Kangaroo Island, but left dry grass-tree stalks in the adjacent areas which were colonised by the bees. Conservationists also developed artificial nesting stalks to support the bee population until new banksia became available, which were placed in the fire-affected areas where the bee still occurred. Almost 300 female carpenter bees used the artificial stalks to raise their young, until disaster struck in the 2019–20 Australian bushfire season. Not only were the areas of the artificial stalks destroyed, but much of the old banksia habitat on Kangaroo Island, and the NSW fires destroyed large areas of habitat there too.
