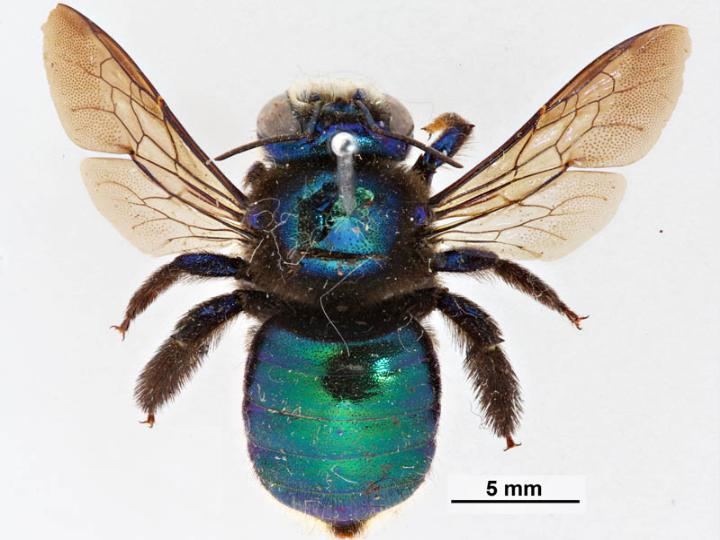
- Female

Scientific classification
- Kingdom: Animalia
- Phylum: Arthropoda
- Class: Insecta
- Order: Hymenoptera
- Family: Apidae
- Genus: Xylocopa
- Species: X. bombylans

Binomial name
- Xylocopa bombylans (Fabricius, 1775)

= Xylocopa bombylans =

Peacock carpenter bee

Species of bee

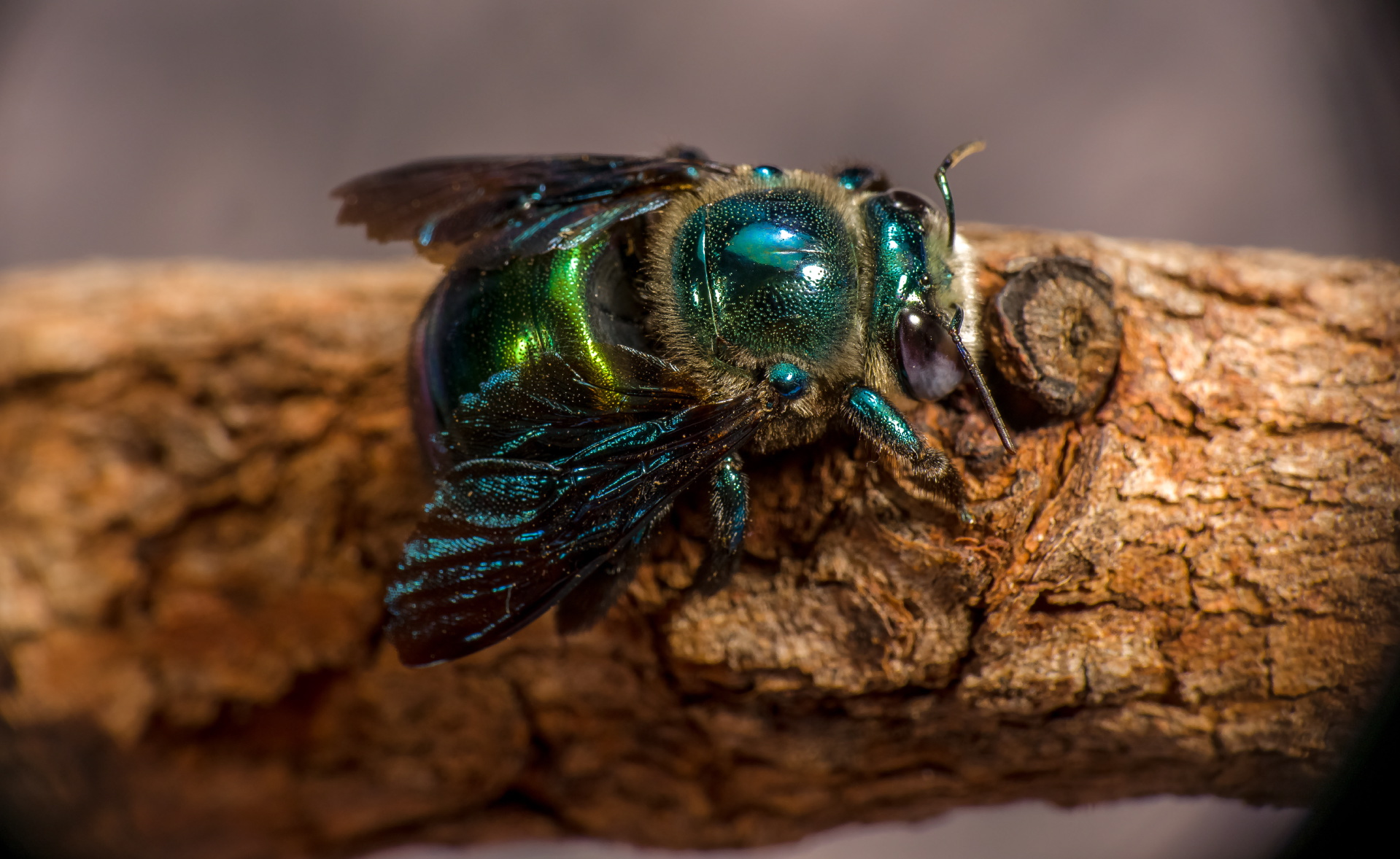
Green Carpenter Bee from far north Queensland, Australia

Xylocopa bombylans, the peacock carpenter bee, is a species of carpenter bee found in Australia. It gets its common name by its habit of burrowing into wood.

It was originally described by Danish naturalist Johan Christian Fabricius in 1775. Its specific epithet is the Latin bombylans "like a bumblebee". The generic name is derived from the Ancient Greek (Ancient Greek: ξυλοκόπος, romanized: ksulokópos) "wood-cutter".

As its name implies, the peacock carpenter bee is a metallic blue-green or green in colour, although it may even appear purplish from some angles. A large stocky bee, it is often heard by its loud low-pitched buzzing while flying between flowers. The male has white face markings. The bee does have a sting which is potentially painful, although no stings have been recorded.

The natural distribution is from the Cape York Peninsula in north Queensland south along the eastern seaboard to the Sydney region (where it overlaps with X. aerata). They can be seen from spring to autumn, commonly feeding at pea flowers of the family Fabaceae, such as Gompholobium species, including Gompholobium latifolium in spring, and Pultenaea elliptica in autumn. It is a pollinator of Melastoma affine. Other flowers visited include those of Banksia, Xanthorrhoea, Hardenbergia violacea, Tristania, Leptospermum, Aotus, Cassia and Leucopogon.

The Peacock carpenter bee nests by hollowing out stalks of grasstrees (Xanthorrhoea), or soft wood such as Banksia, Casuarina, Melaleuca and Leptospermum. The female excavates a tunnel with her jaws and picks up and dumps the wood shavings outside. The hollow can reach 30 centimetres (12 in) long by 11–14 millimetres (0.43–0.55 in) in diameter. Larger pieces of wood may allow for multiple tunnels. Several female bees may use a nest, one breeding and the others guarding. A bee defends the 7–10-millimetre (0.3–0.4 in) wide entrance by blocking it with its abdomen (compare Allodapula). Both male and female bees may overwinter within the tunnels. The tunnels are partitioned into several cells, where the mother bee lays an egg in each accompanied by provisions of nectar and pollen.
