= List of invasive plant species in Hawaii =

Numerous plants have been introduced to Hawaii, and many of them have become invasive species.

== Invasive plants ==
The following are some of the invasive plant species established in Hawaii:

- Ageratina riparia
- Andropogon glomeratus
- Andropogon virginicus
- Argyreia nervosa
- Carduus pycnocephalus
- Casuarina
- Cenchrus ciliaris
- Christella dentata
- Chrysophyllum oliviforme
- Cinchona pubescens
- Clusia rosea
- Cortaderia selloana
- Cotoneaster pannosus
- Cyathea cooperi
- Cynodon dactylon
- Erica lusitanica
- Eucalyptus globulus
- Ficus microcarpa
- Hedychium gardnerianum
- Hyparrhenia hirta
- Hypericum canariense
- Ilex aquifolium
- Ipomoea cairica
- Ipomoea indica
- Lantana montevidensis
- Lonicera japonica
- Lygodium microphyllum
- Miconia calvescens
- Muhlenbergia mexicana
- Passiflora tarminiana
- Psidium cattleianum
- Rhizophora mangle
- Rubus armeniacus
- Rubus ellipticus
- Schinus terebinthifolius
- Sporobolus indicus
- Sporobolus virginicus
- Typha latifolia
- Verbena bonariensis

== Naturalized trees ==
The following are some of the naturalized trees and shrubs of Hawaii:

- Acacia confusa
- Acacia mearnsii
- Albizia saman
- Aleurites moluccanus
- Breadfruit
- Calophyllum inophyllum
- Casuarina equisetifolia
- Casuarina glauca
- Ceratonia siliqua
- Eucalyptus globulus
- Albizia - Falcataria moluccana
- Ficus microcarpa
- Grevillea robusta
- Heliotropium foertherianum
- Heptaphyllum actinophyllum
- Leucaena leucocephala
- Melastoma sanguineum
- Melastoma septemnervium
- Metrosideros kermadecensis
- Miconia calvescens
- Morinda citrifolia
- Myrica faya
- Paper mulberry
- Prosopis pallida
- Psidium cattleianum
- Psidium guajava
- Schinus terebinthifolius
- Spathodea
- Syzygium jambos
- Terminalia catappa
- Trema orientalis

== See also ==
- Invasive species in the United States
