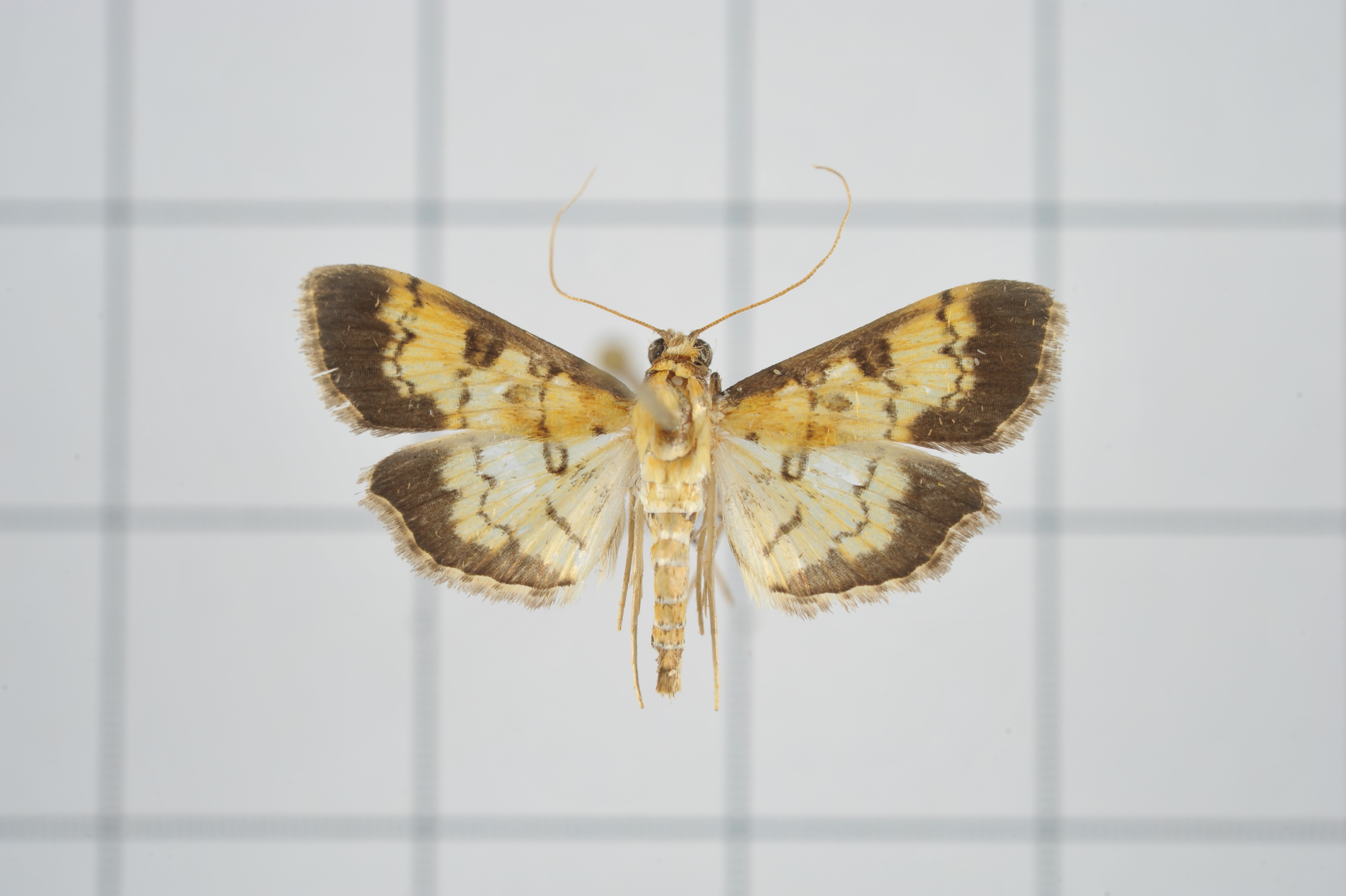
- Adult male of Ategumia adipalis

Scientific classification
- Kingdom: Animalia
- Phylum: Arthropoda
- Class: Insecta
- Order: Lepidoptera
- Family: Crambidae
- Subfamily: Spilomelinae
- Tribe: Nomophilini
- Genus: Ategumia; Amsel, 1956

= Ategumia =

Genus of moths

Ategumia is a genus of moths in the species-rich subfamily Spilomelinae of the family Crambidae.

== Distribution ==
Although the majority of species (including the type species A. matutinalis) placed in this genus are distributed in the Americas, three species are described from the Indomalayan and Australasian realms, namely A. adipalis, A. fatualis and A. geographicalis.

== Larval hostplants ==
The caterpillars of Ategumia are, as far as known, herbivores. Known hostplants are all in the Melastomataceae family: Melastoma malabathricum, M. "deficidum" (a misspelling of decemfidum?, which is a synonym of Melastoma sanguineum var. sanguineum), Miconia crenata and M. umbellata. Ategumia adipalis, A. ebulealis and A. fatualis were introduced to Hawaii for biological pest control to tackle Melastomataceae plants that have become invasive there.

== Species ==
- Ategumia actealis (Walker, 1859)
- Ategumia adipalis (Lederer, 1863)
- Ategumia crocealis (Dognin, 1906)
- Ategumia dilecticolor (Dyar, 1912)
- Ategumia ebulealis (Guenée, 1854)
- Ategumia fatualis (Lederer, 1863)
- Ategumia geographicalis (Guenée, 1854)
- Ategumia insipidalis (Lederer, 1863)
- Ategumia longidentalis (Dognin, 1904)
- Ategumia matutinalis (Guenée, 1854)
- Ategumia nalotalis (Schaus, 1924)
