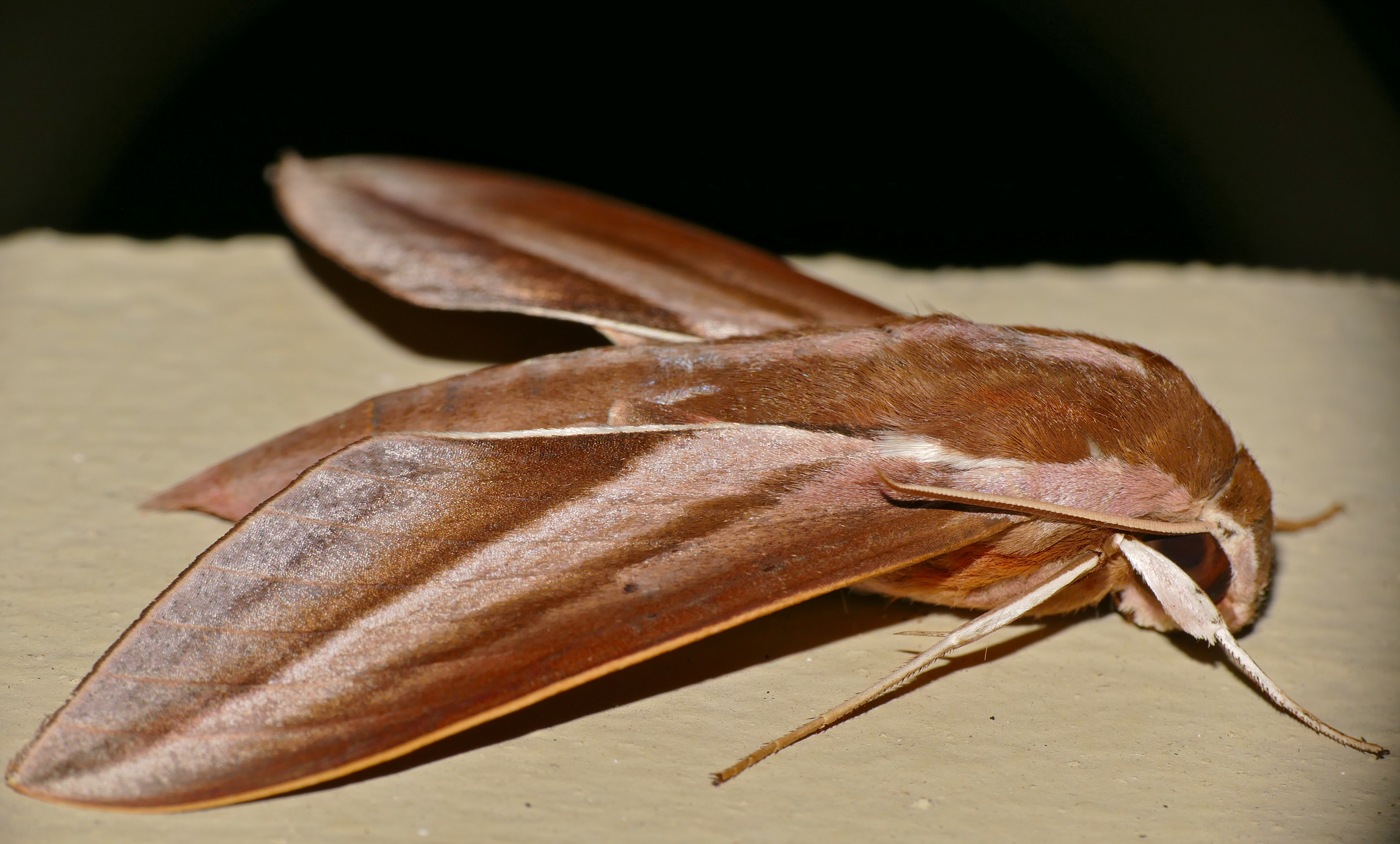

Scientific classification
- Kingdom: Animalia
- Phylum: Arthropoda
- Class: Insecta
- Order: Lepidoptera
- Family: Sphingidae
- Genus: Theretra
- Species: T. suffusa

Binomial name
- Theretra suffusa (Walker, 1856)

Synonyms
- Chaerocampa suffusa Walker, 1856; Choerocampa hector Boisduval, 1875

= Theretra suffusa =

Species of moth

Theretra suffusa is a moth of the family Sphingidae.

== Distribution ==
It is known from Nepal, north-eastern India, Thailand, southern China, Taiwan, southern Japan (Ryukyu Archipelago), Laos, Cambodia, Vietnam, the Andaman Islands, Malaysia (Peninsular, Sarawak, Sabah), Singapore, Indonesia (Sumatra, Java, Kalimantan) and Palawan.

== Description ==
The wingspan is 80–102 mm. It is similar to Theretra alecto but recognizable by the broad pale dorsal stripe running along the thorax and abdomen, and the black basal patch of the hindwing upperside not extending towards the tornus. The forewing upperside is also similar to Theretra alecto but the contrast between the paler basal and median area and the darker postmedian area is stronger.

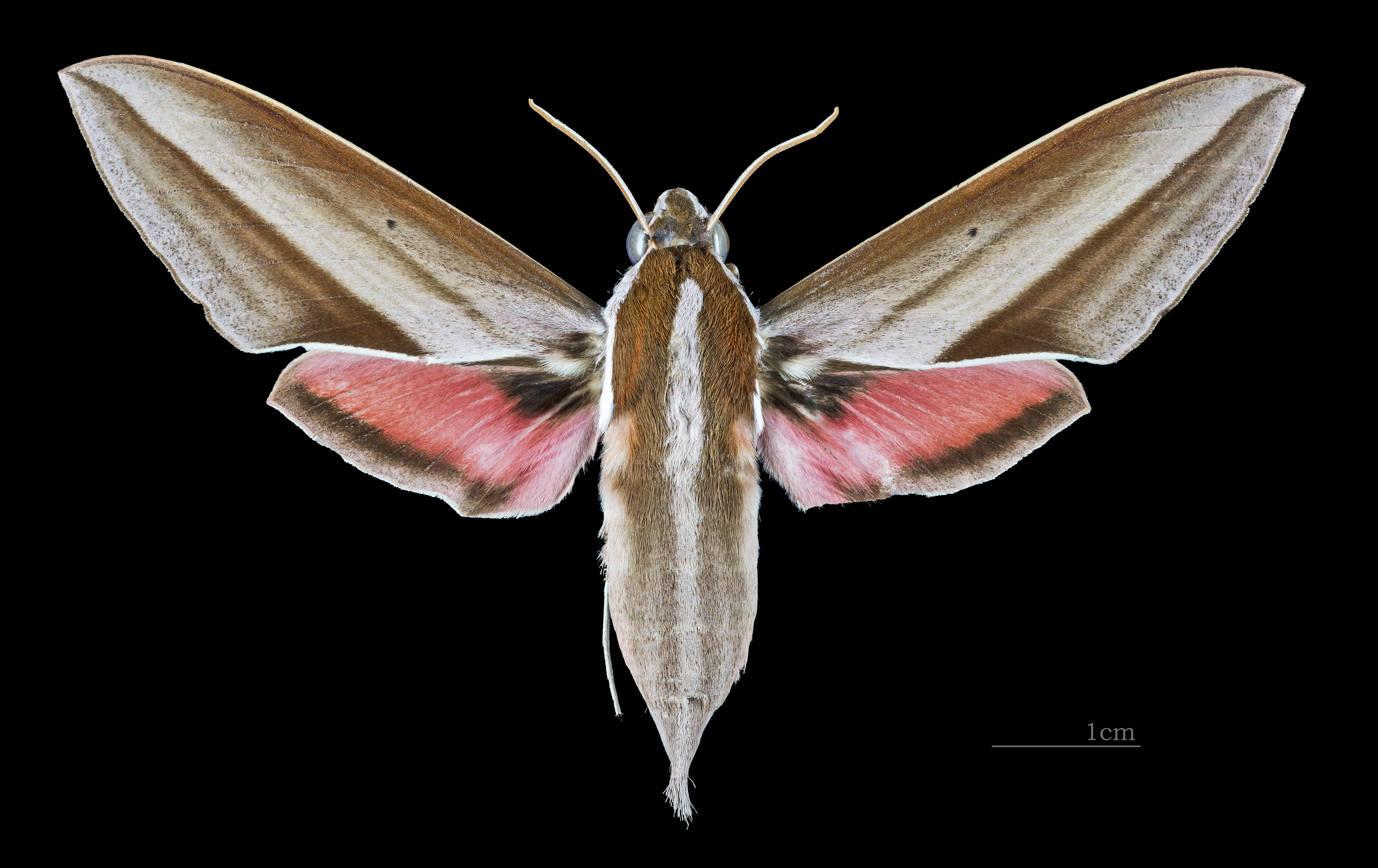
Female dorsal view

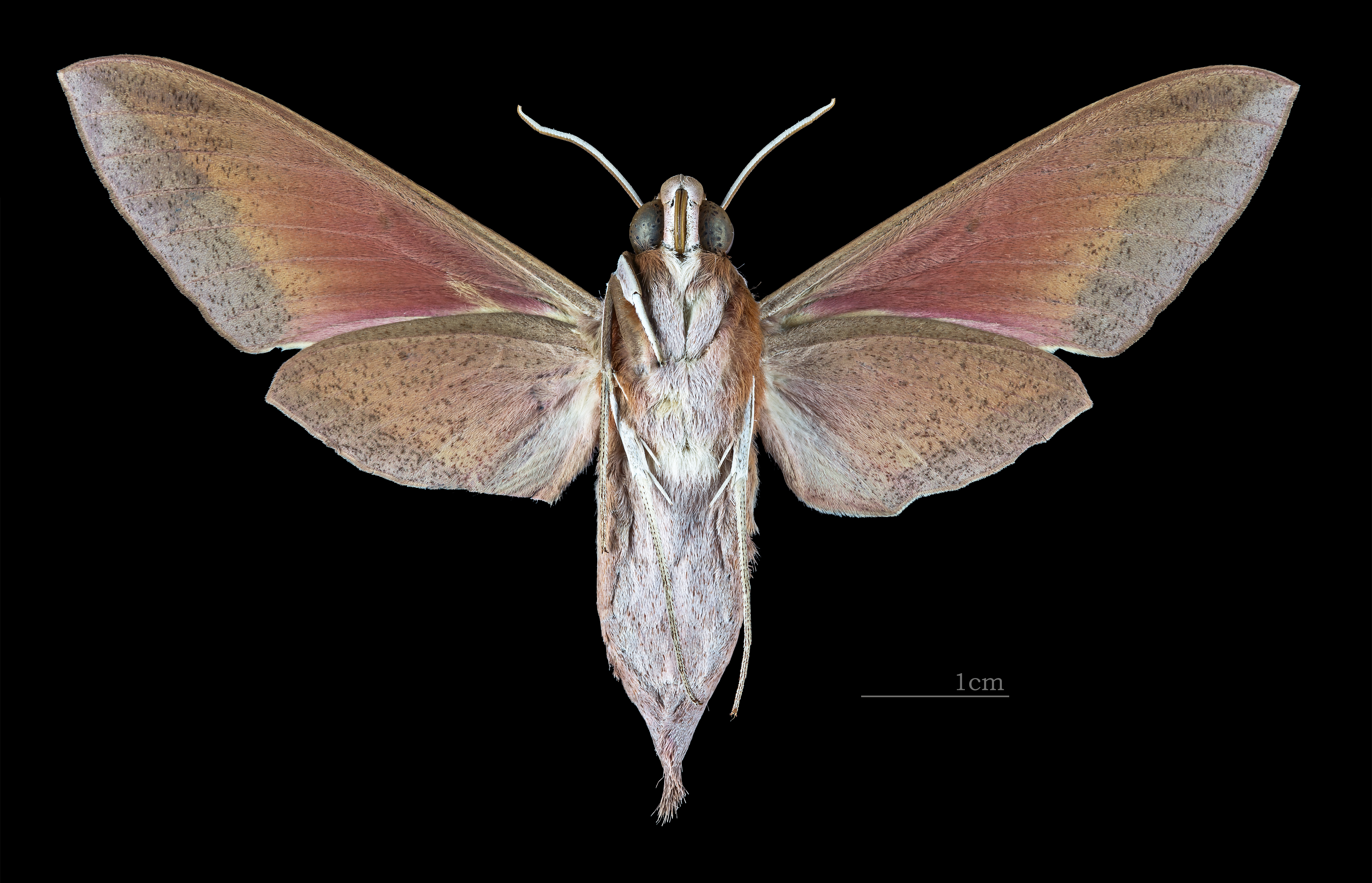
Female ventral view

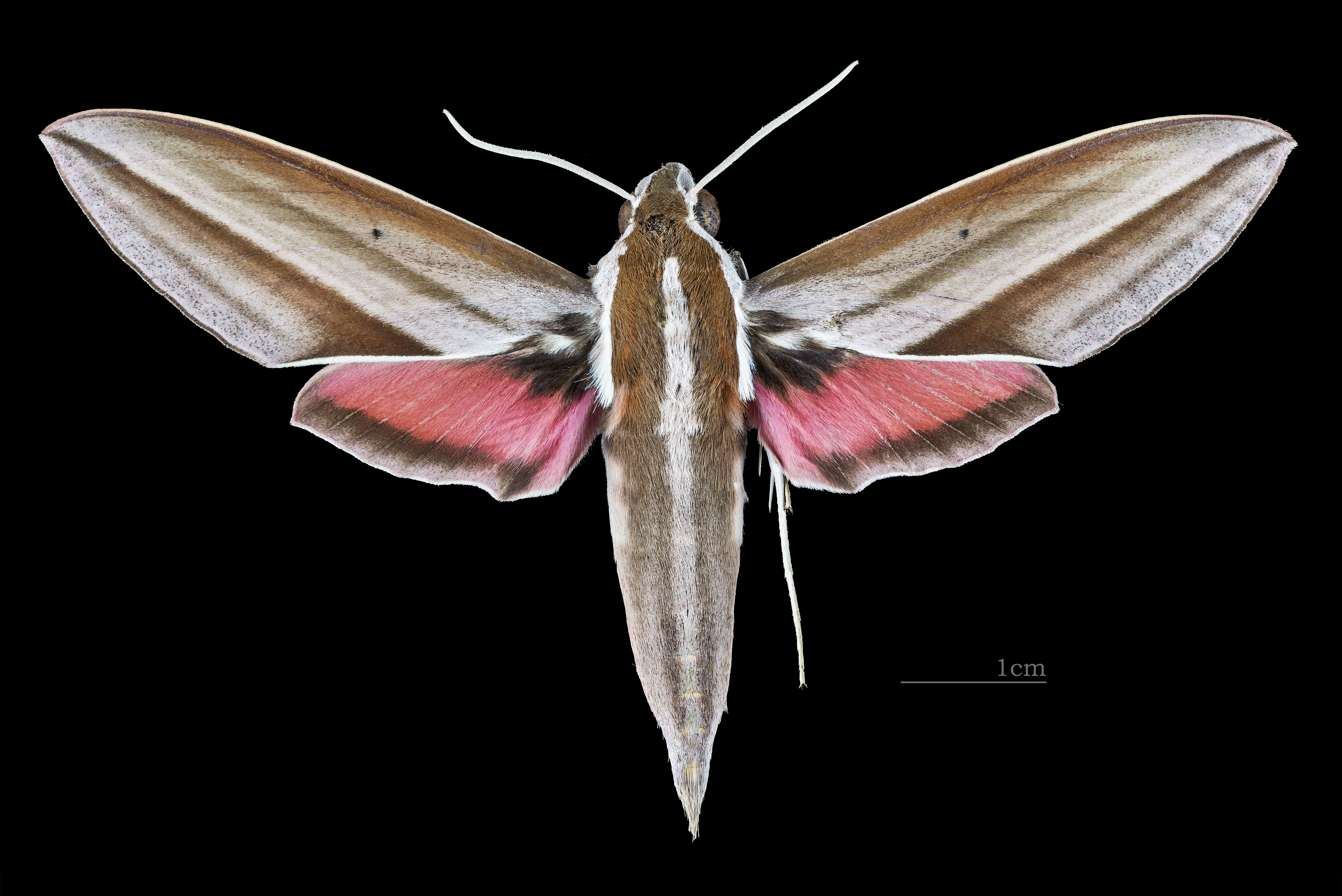
Male dorsal view

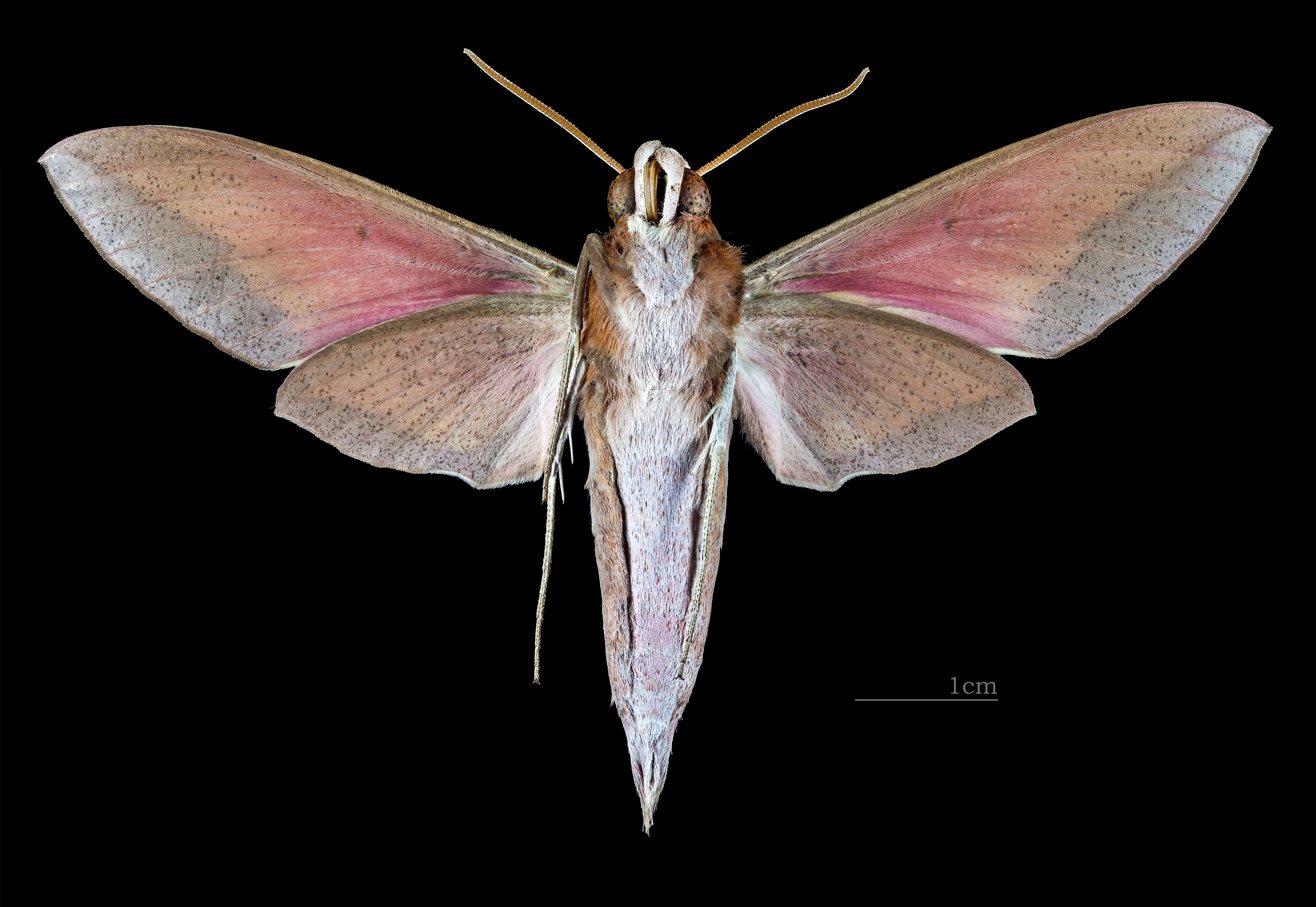
Male ventral view

== Biology ==
The larvae feed on Melastoma sanguineum in India.
