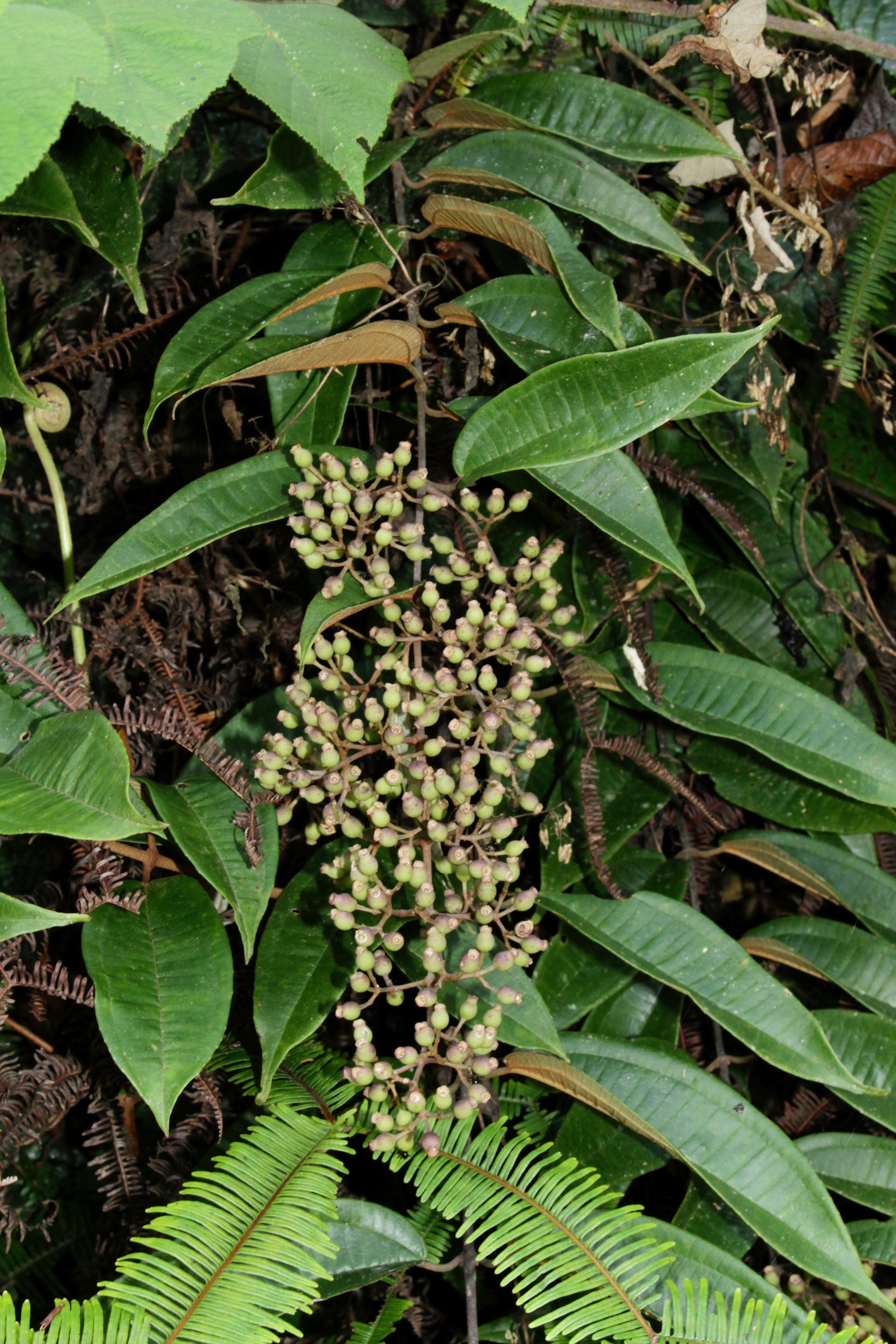
- Diplectria divaricata

Scientific classification
- Kingdom: Plantae
- Clade: Tracheophytes
- Clade: Angiosperms
- Clade: Eudicots
- Clade: Rosids
- Order: Myrtales
- Family: Melastomataceae
- Subfamily: Melastomatoideae
- Tribe: Dissochaeteae
- Genus: Diplectria (Blume) Rchb.

Synonyms
- Anplectrum A.Gray; Aplectrum Blume; Backeria Bakh.f.

= Diplectria =

Genus of flowering plants

Diplectria is a genus of flowering plants in the family Melastomataceae, erected by Ludwig Reichenbach in 1841. Some species, including the type D. divaricata, have also been placed previously in Melastoma and Dissochaeta; they are native to Indochina, Hainan, Malesia, through to New Guinea.

== Species ==
As of October 2026, Plants of the World Online accepts seven species:

- Diplectria barbata (Triana ex C.B.Clarke) Franken & M.C.Roos
- Diplectria conica Bakh.f.
- Diplectria divaricata (Willd.) Kuntze
- Diplectria maxwellii Karton.
- Diplectria micrantha Veldkamp
- Diplectria stipularis (Blume) Kuntze
- Diplectria viminalis (Jack) Kuntze
