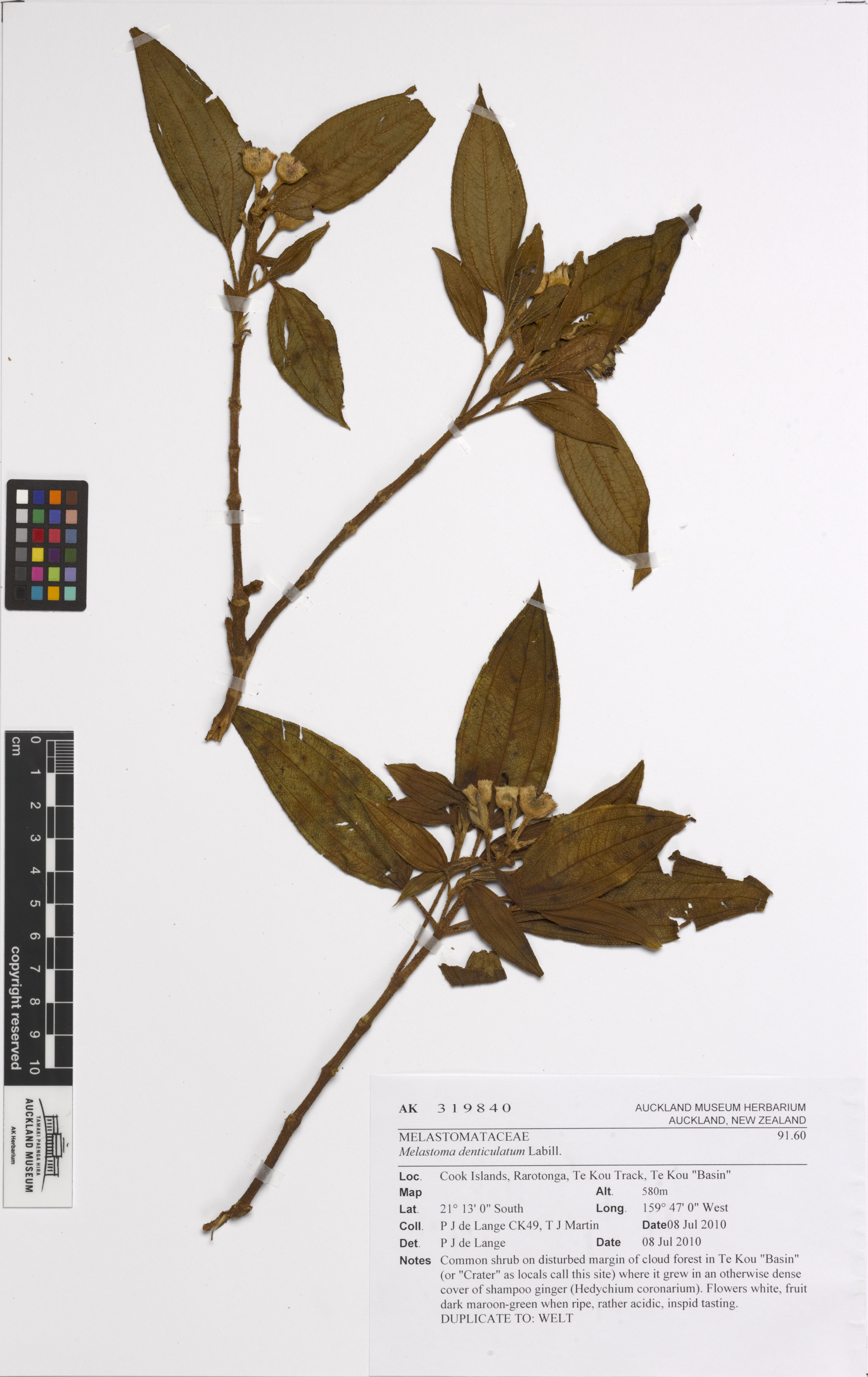

Scientific classification
- Kingdom: Plantae
- Clade: Tracheophytes
- Clade: Angiosperms
- Clade: Eudicots
- Clade: Rosids
- Order: Myrtales
- Family: Melastomataceae
- Genus: Melastoma
- Species: M. denticulatum

Binomial name
- Melastoma denticulatum Labill.

Synonyms
- Melastoma taitense DC.; Melastoma vitiense Naudin

= Melastoma denticulatum =

Species of flowering plant

Melastoma denticulatum is a species of flowering plant in the family Melastomataceae, native from the Solomon Islands to the south Pacific.

== Taxonomy ==
Melastoma denticulatum was first described by Jacques Labillardière in 1825. Its acceptance as a distinct species has varied. It is accepted by Plants of the World Online, as of November 2020. It has also been treated as a synonym of Melastoma malabathricum and Melastoma affine, and also as misapplied to Melastoma affine.
