= Ategumia fatualis =

Scientific classification
- Kingdom: Animalia
- Phylum: Arthropoda
- Class: Insecta
- Order: Lepidoptera
- Family: Crambidae
- Genus: Ategumia
- Species: A. fatualis

Binomial name
- Ategumia fatualis (Lederer, 1863)

Synonyms
- Botys fatualis Lederer, 1863; Bocchoris fatualis

Species of moth

Ategumia fatualis is a moth of the family Crambidae described by Julius Lederer in 1863. It is native to Java and the Philippines, but was introduced to Hawaii and Kauai in 1958 for the control of Melastoma malabathricum.

The larvae feed on Melastoma malabathricum. They roll the leaves of their host plant.
