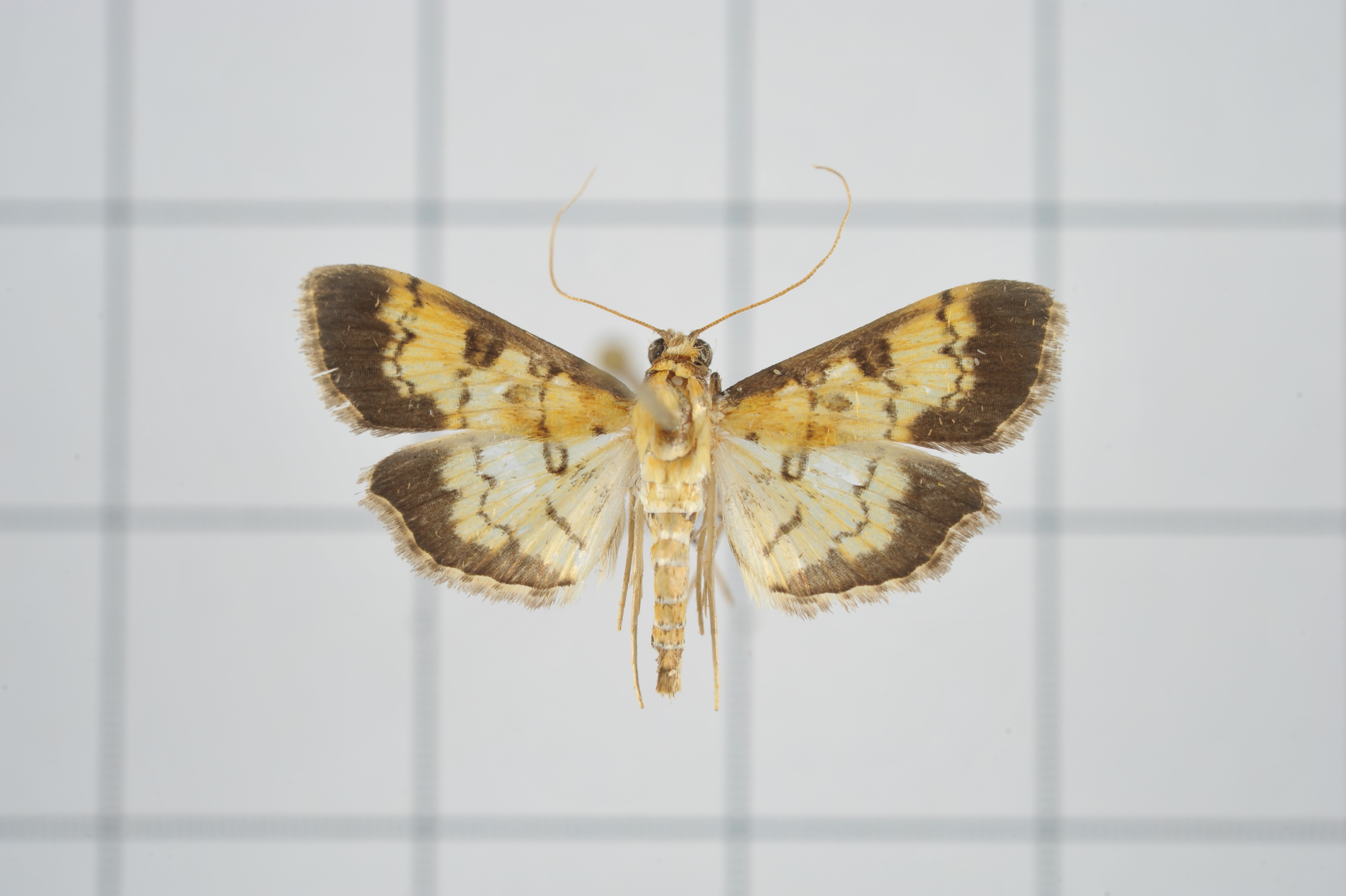

Scientific classification
- Kingdom: Animalia
- Phylum: Arthropoda
- Class: Insecta
- Order: Lepidoptera
- Family: Crambidae
- Genus: Ategumia
- Species: A. adipalis

Binomial name
- Ategumia adipalis (Lederer, 1863)

Synonyms
- Botys adipalis Lederer, 1863; Bocchoris adipalis; Botys notatalis Walker, 1866; Samea cuprinalis Moore, 1877

= Ategumia adipalis =

Species of moth

Ategumia adipalis is a moth of the family Crambidae described by Julius Lederer in 1863. It is found from India to Australia and in Japan, Sri Lanka, Vietnam and China. It was introduced to Hawaii in 1965.

The wingspan is about 21 mm.

The larvae feed on Melastoma candidum and Melastoma malabathricum. They roll the leaves of their host plant.

== Subspecies ==
- Ategumia adipalis adipalis Lederer, 1863
- Ategumia adipalis nigromarginalis Caradja, 1925 (from China)
