= Ategumia actealis =

Scientific classification
- Kingdom: Animalia
- Phylum: Arthropoda
- Class: Insecta
- Order: Lepidoptera
- Family: Crambidae
- Genus: Ategumia
- Species: A. actealis

Binomial name
- Ategumia actealis (Walker, 1859)

Synonyms
- Hymenia actealis Walker, 1859; Samea dignotalis Walker, 1866

Species of moth

Ategumia actealis is a moth in the family Crambidae. It was described by Francis Walker in 1859. It is found in Brazil and Honduras.
