= Ategumia longidentalis =

Scientific classification
- Kingdom: Animalia
- Phylum: Arthropoda
- Class: Insecta
- Order: Lepidoptera
- Family: Crambidae
- Genus: Ategumia
- Species: A. longidentalis

Binomial name
- Ategumia longidentalis (Dognin, 1904)

Synonyms
- Mimorista longidentalis Dognin, 1904

Species of moth

Ategumia longidentalis is a moth in the family Crambidae. It was described by Paul Dognin in 1904. It is found in Peru.
