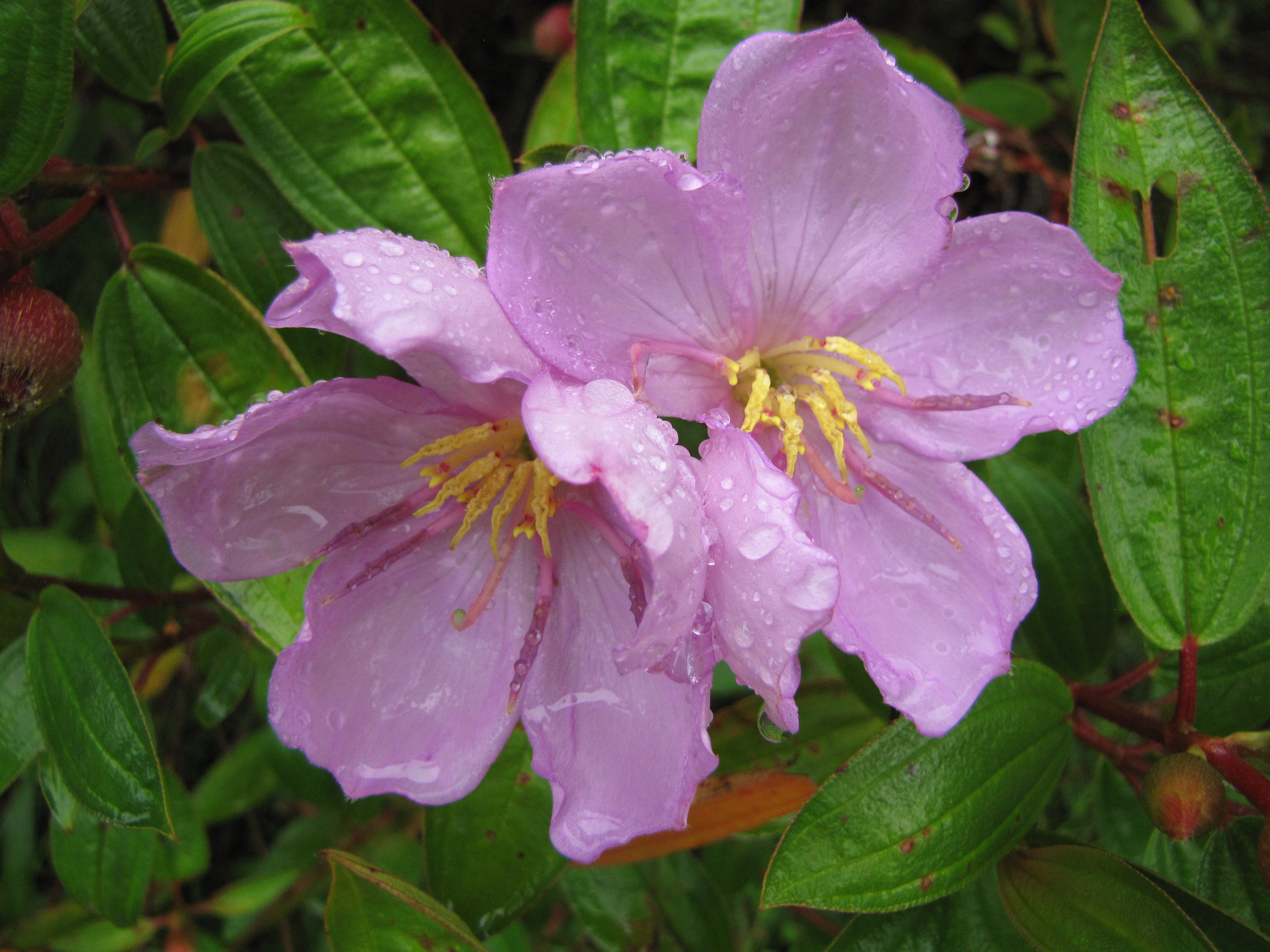

Scientific classification
- Kingdom: Plantae
- Clade: Tracheophytes
- Clade: Angiosperms
- Clade: Eudicots
- Clade: Rosids
- Order: Myrtales
- Family: Melastomataceae
- Genus: Melastoma
- Species: M. septemnervium

Binomial name
- Melastoma septemnervium Lour.

Synonyms
- Melastoma candidum D. Don

= Melastoma septemnervium =

Species of tree

Melastoma septemnervium are erect shrubs or small slender trees with 5 petal, medium-sized, pink flowers that have made them attractive for cultivation. The leaves have the 5 distinctive longitudinal veins (nerves) typical of plants in the family Melastomataceae.

== Description ==
Melastoma septemnervium are erect shrubs or small trees up to 5 m tall. Leaves are elliptical with short stiff hairs or scales on the upper surface and finer dense hairs on the lower surface but with a mixture of scales on the nerves.

== Distribution ==
Native to Vietnam, southern China, the Philippines, Taiwan, Ryukyu Islands, and southern Japan. Cultivated and naturalized in Hawaii but also reported to be abundant and invasive on Kauai and Hawaii Island from sea level up to 900 m elevation.

Melastoma septemnervium grows in light forests, clearings, and grass lands, or on rocky slopes, but prefers mesic to wet areas and bog margin habitats in Hawaii.

== Taxonomy ==
Hawaiian populations of M. septemnervium were historically assigned to Melastoma malabathricum non L. but later were identified as M. candidum D. Don by Wagner et al. 1999 due to a number of consistently different traits, including a higher chromosome number (2n = 56 versus Melastoma malabathricum 2n = 24).

M. septemnervium was first described by Loureiro in 1790 (Flora Cochinchinensis 1: 273–274). M. septemnervium is the accepted name by some sources with M. candidum as a junior synonym, but both names are used widely.
