= Ategumia dilecticolor =

Scientific classification
- Kingdom: Animalia
- Phylum: Arthropoda
- Class: Insecta
- Order: Lepidoptera
- Family: Crambidae
- Genus: Ategumia
- Species: A. dilecticolor

Binomial name
- Ategumia dilecticolor (Dyar, 1912)

Synonyms
- Pyrausta dilecticolor Dyar, 1912; Samea phyllisalis Druce, 1899; Sameodes flavibaccata Hampson, 1913

Species of moth

Ategumia dilecticolor is a moth in the family Crambidae. It was described by Harrison Gray Dyar Jr. in 1912. It is found in Mexico (Veracruz), Guatemala and Honduras.
