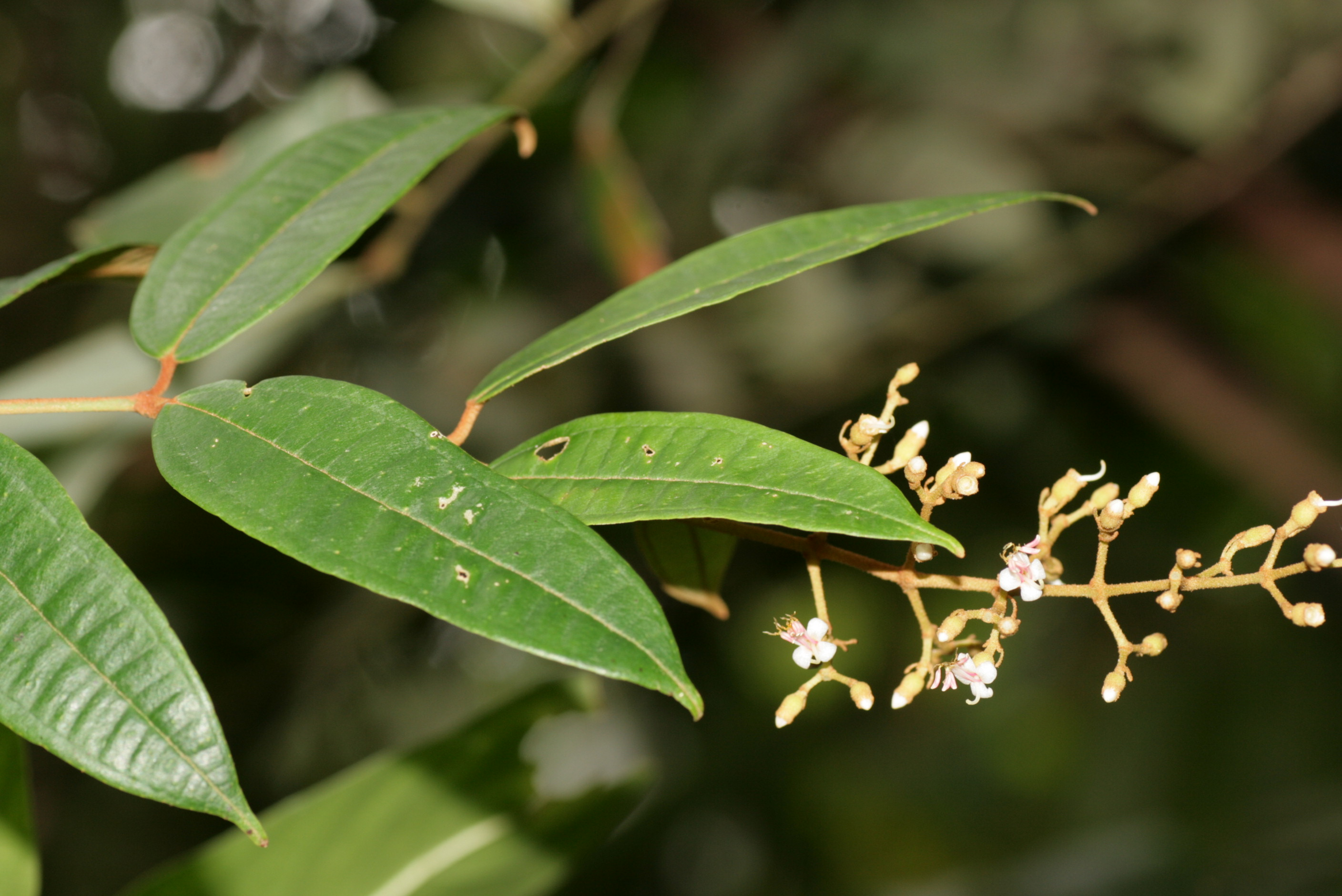
- Dissochaeta biligulata, Borneo

Scientific classification
- Kingdom: Plantae
- Clade: Tracheophytes
- Clade: Angiosperms
- Clade: Eudicots
- Clade: Rosids
- Clade: Malvids
- Order: Myrtales
- Family: Melastomataceae
- Genus: Dissochaeta; Blume (1831)

Synonyms
- Neodissochaeta Bakh.f.; Omphalopus Naudin

= Dissochaeta =

Genus of flowering plants

Dissochaeta is a genus of plants in the family Melastomataceae. Species can be found in: Hainan and Indo-China through to Malesia; some, previously placed here, are now in the restored genus Diplectria.

== Species ==
Plants of the World Online currently (July 2025) includes:

1. Dissochaeta acmura Stapf & M.L.Green
2. Dissochaeta angiensis Kaneh. & Hatus. ex Ohwi
3. Dissochaeta annulata Hook.f. ex Triana
4. Dissochaeta axillaris Cogn.
5. Dissochaeta bakhuizenii Veldkamp
6. Dissochaeta biligulata Korth.
7. Dissochaeta bracteata (Jack) Blume
8. Dissochaeta brassii (M.P.Nayar) Karton.
9. Dissochaeta celebica Blume
10. Dissochaeta cumingii Naudin
11. Dissochaeta densiflora Ridl.
12. Dissochaeta fallax (Jack) Blume
13. Dissochaeta glandiformis J.F.Maxwell
14. Dissochaeta gracilis (Jack) Blume
15. Dissochaeta griffithii (M.P.Nayar) Karton.
16. Dissochaeta horrida (Bakh.f.) Karton.
17. Dissochaeta inappendiculata Blume
18. Dissochaeta intermedia Blume
19. Dissochaeta leprosa (Blume) Blume
20. Dissochaeta malayana Furtado
21. Dissochaeta nodosa Korth.
22. Dissochaeta pallida (Jack) Blume
23. Dissochaeta punctulata Hook.f. ex Triana
24. Dissochaeta rectandra Karton.
25. Dissochaeta rubiginosa Stapf
26. Dissochaeta sagittata Blume
27. Dissochaeta schumannii Cogn.
28. Dissochaeta spectabilis J.F.Maxwell
29. Dissochaeta vacillans (Blume) Blume - type species
