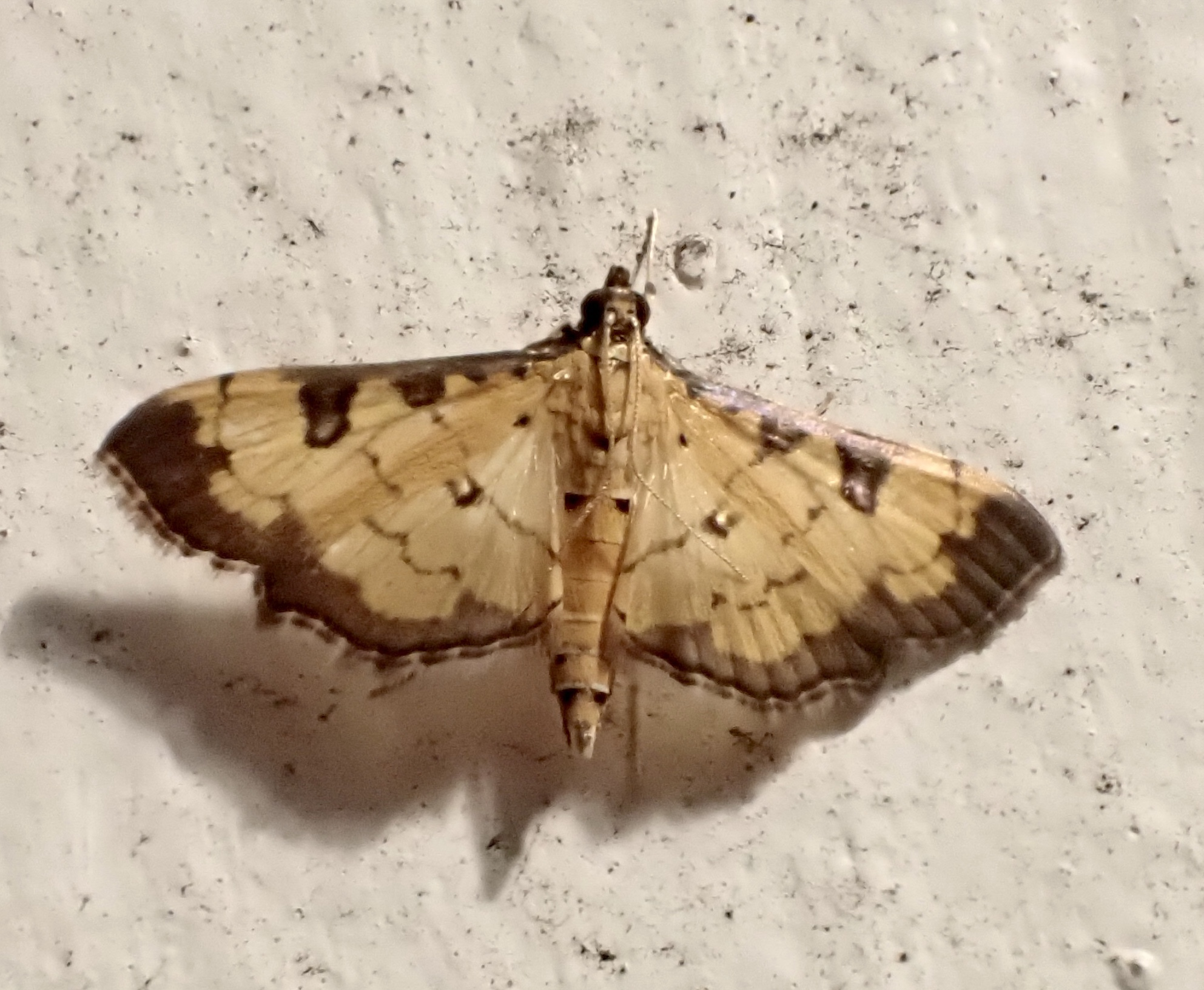

Scientific classification
- Kingdom: Animalia
- Phylum: Arthropoda
- Class: Insecta
- Order: Lepidoptera
- Family: Crambidae
- Genus: Ategumia
- Species: A. ebulealis

Binomial name
- Ategumia ebulealis (Guenee, 1854)

Synonyms
- Samea ebulealis Guenee, 1854; Blepharomastix ebulealis

= Ategumia ebulealis =

Species of moth

Ategumia ebulealis, the clidemia leafroller, is a moth of the family Crambidae. The species was described by Achille Guenée in 1854. It is found in Central America, the Antilles, and the south-eastern United States (Florida and Georgia). It was thought to be introduced to Hawaii, but later research concluded it was actually Ategumia matutinalis which was released.

The wingspan is about 18 mm. Adults are on wing in January, from March to April and from June to December in Florida.

The larvae feed on Heterotrichum umbellatum and Clidemia species, including C. hirta.
