= Ategumia matutinalis =

Scientific classification
- Kingdom: Animalia
- Phylum: Arthropoda
- Class: Insecta
- Order: Lepidoptera
- Family: Crambidae
- Genus: Ategumia
- Species: A. matutinalis

Binomial name
- Ategumia matutinalis (Guenee, 1854)

Synonyms
- Samea matutinalis Guenee, 1854; Sylepte matutinalis; Botys odiusalis Walker, 1859

Species of moth

Ategumia matutinalis is a moth of the family Crambidae described by Achille Guenée in 1854. It is found in Central America, South America and the Antilles, including Puerto Rico, Trinidad, French Guiana, Suriname, Ecuador and Jamaica. It was introduced to Hawaii for the control of Clidemia hirta, although researchers thought they were introducing Ategumia ebulealis.

The larvae feed on Heterotrichum cymosum and Clidemia species, including C. hirta. They roll the leaves of their host plant.
