= Melastoma malabituin =

Scientific classification
- Kingdom: Plantae
- Clade: Tracheophytes
- Clade: Angiosperms
- Clade: Eudicots
- Clade: Rosids
- Order: Myrtales
- Family: Melastomataceae
- Genus: Melastoma
- Species: M. malabituin

Binomial name
- Melastoma malabituin J.Agcaoilli, Barcelona & Pelser

Species of shrub

Melastoma malabituin is a species of shrubs in the plant family Melastomataceae. It is native to the island of Luzon in the Philippines. It was discovered by Filipino botanist John Michael Agcaoilli in 1997 and first described in 2020.

== Description ==
Melastoma malabituin is characterized by having densely pilose indumentum on young stems and petioles, penicillate trichomes on its hypanthium, and serrulate and ciliate petals with an apical penicillate emergence.

== Taxonomy ==
Melastoma malabituin was first described in 2020 by John M. Agcaoilli, Julie F. Barcelona and Pieter B. Pelser with help from researchers from the Philippine Taxonomic Initiative (PTI). The epithet malabituin refers to the Tagalog word for 'resembling a star' (mala- = like, resembling, similar to; bituin = star). This is in reference to the penicillate hypanthium emergences of M. malabituin.

== Distribution and habitat ==
Melastoma malabituin is found in the island of Luzon in the Philippines. It is currently only known from the municipalities of San Mariano and Echague, Isabela Province, Luzon, Philippines, where it is found in remnants of secondary lowland forests in the Sierra Madre mountain range.
