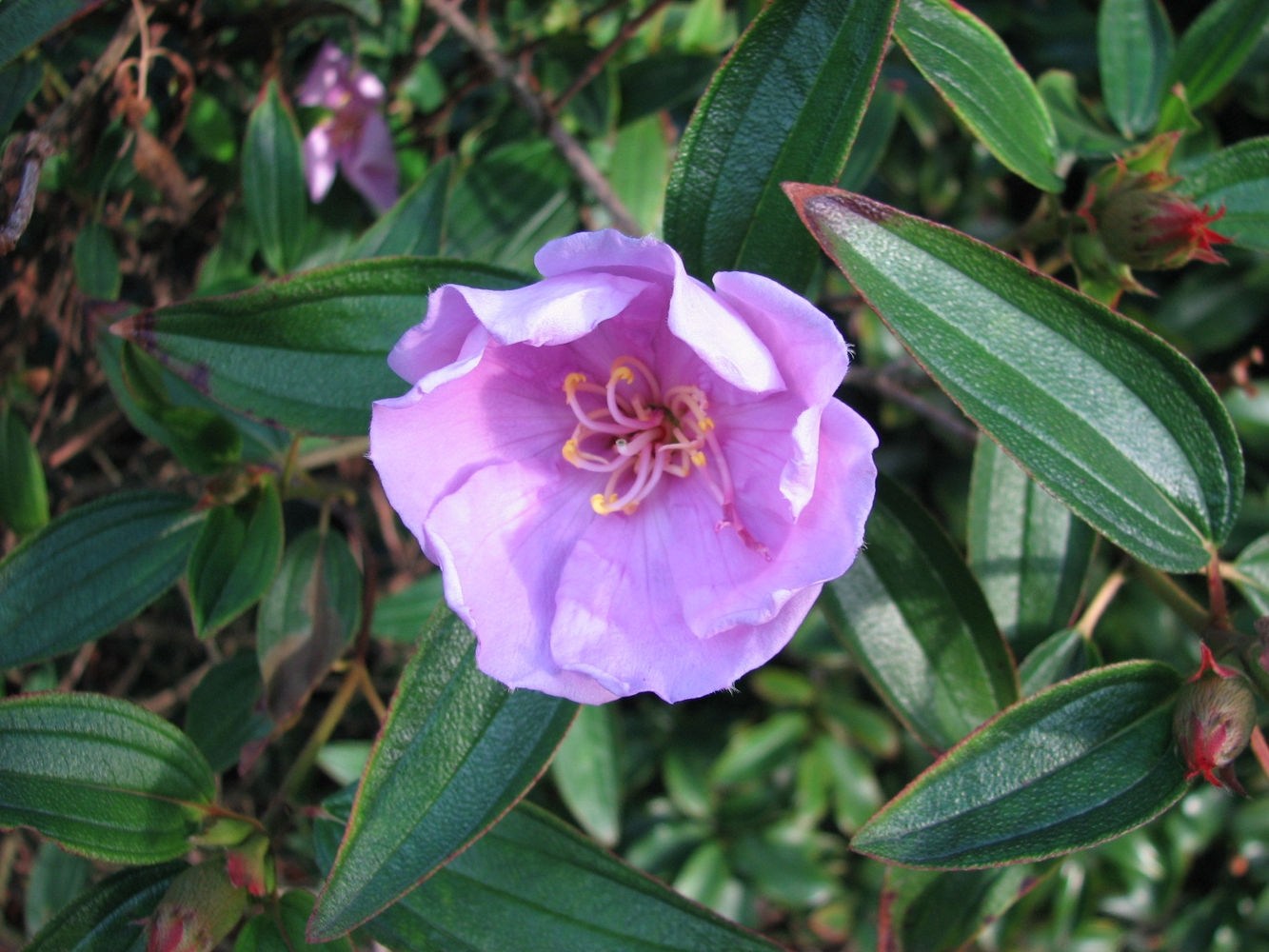

Scientific classification
- Kingdom: Plantae
- Clade: Tracheophytes
- Clade: Angiosperms
- Clade: Eudicots
- Clade: Rosids
- Order: Myrtales
- Family: Melastomataceae
- Genus: Melastoma
- Species: M. affine

Binomial name
- Melastoma affine D. Don

Synonyms
- See text.

= Melastoma affine =

Species of shrub

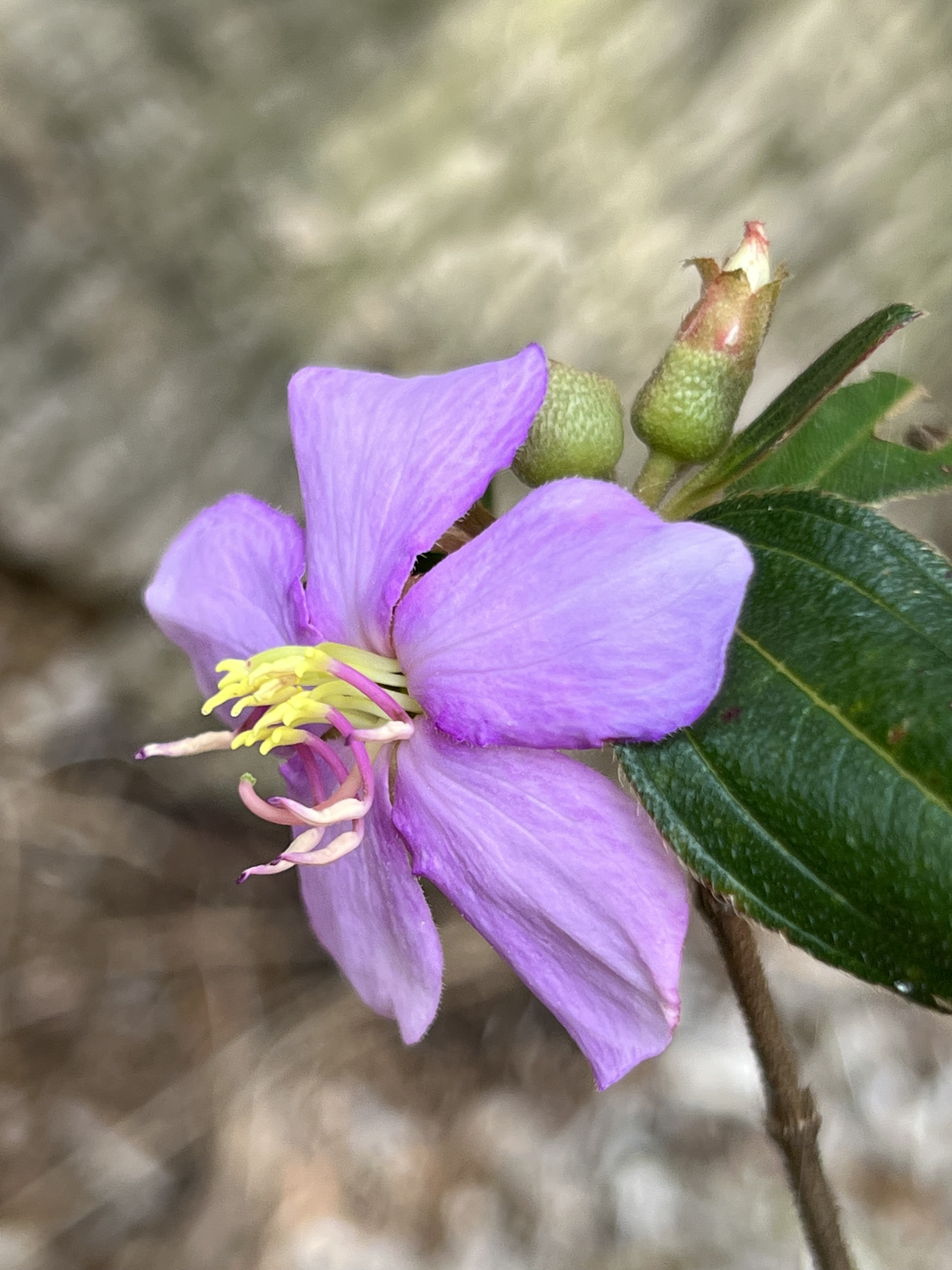
Flower & bud

Melastoma affine, also known by the common names blue tongue, straits rhododendron or native lassiandra, is a shrub of the family Melastomataceae. Distributed in tropical and sub-tropical forests of the Indian subcontinent, Southeast Asia and Australia, it is a plant of rainforest margins. Bees are the principal pollinators of this species.

== Taxonomy ==
Melastoma affine was first described by Scottish botanist David Don in 1823. The taxonomy of the genus Melastoma is tricky, requiring a complete revision. Early genetics studies were published from 2001, through to recently, but a revision based on them has yet to be. In 2001 Karsten Meyer proposed a revision in which this species and other species were subsumed within the species Melastoma malabathricum.

In Australia, currently most authorities do not accept this; instead the naturally occurring populations in WA, NT, Qld and northeastern NSW remain recognised as this species M. affine, except by authorities in Qld.

=== Synonyms ===
As of November 2020, the Australian Plant Census (APC) accepts the following synonyms of Melastoma affine:

- Melastoma malabathricum var. nanum F.M.Bailey
- Melastoma malabathricum var. polyanthum (Blume) Benth.
- Melastoma novae-hollandiae Naudin
- Melastoma polyanthum Blume

Two other names that have been used for this species it regards as misapplied rather than synonyms:

- Melastoma malabathricum L.
- Melastoma denticulatum Labill.

== Description ==
It is found as a shrub to 2 m (6.6 ft) in height. The leaves are ovate and measure 6 to 12 cm (2.5 to 4.5 in) in length, and 2–4 cm (1–1.5 in) wide. Covered in fine hair they have longitudinal veins. Appearing in spring and summer, the flowers occur on the ends of branchlets and are purple with five petals and sepals. There are two sets of distinctive stamens, five opposite the petals and five opposite the sepals. The antesepalous ones have long anthers with a bilobed appendage at their base. It produces 8mm long purple fruits that split open to expose a redish to purple flesh with many small seeds. The common name "blue tongue" refers to the edible purplish-black pulp within the fruit capsules which stains the mouth blue.

== Distribution and habitat ==
Melastoma affine is found from the Indian subcontinent through Southeast Asia, Malaysia, Indonesia and into Australia. Within Australia, it is found from the Kimberleys in Western Australia, across the Northern Territory and Queensland, and reaches as far south as Kempsey on the New South Wales mid north coast. It grows in wet areas in sclerophyll forest.

M. affine is important as being a pioneer species that colonises disturbed wet-sclerophyll and rain forest habitats in the Australasian region. It produces no nectar - giving pollinators large amounts of pollen instead, which must be extracted through pores on the anthers. Melastoma affine is pollinated by bees, particularly Xylocopa bombylans, X. aff. gressittii, Amegilla anomola and Nomia species. Honeybees outcompete native bees for pollen at flowers, impacting on the species' reproduction.

== Cultivation ==
A fast-growing and adaptable shrub, Melastoma affine is sometimes seen in cultivation. It can be propagated by seed or cuttings.

The plant is used to make grass jelly (cincau perdu) in Indonesia. The fruits ripen to dark gray, and contain an edible purple pulp around the seeds. It stains the mouth black (hence the name of the genus). Sap or an extract from the leaves is used as a herbal medicine against a number of conditions including diarrhoea, burns, ulcers, wounds, piles and thrush in Indonesia and the Solomon Islands.
