= Ategumia crocealis =

Scientific classification
- Kingdom: Animalia
- Phylum: Arthropoda
- Class: Insecta
- Order: Lepidoptera
- Family: Crambidae
- Genus: Ategumia
- Species: A. crocealis

Binomial name
- Ategumia crocealis (Dognin, 1906)

Synonyms
- Sylepta crocealis Dognin, 1906

Species of moth

Ategumia crocealis is a moth in the family Crambidae. It was described by Paul Dognin in 1906. It is found in Ecuador.
