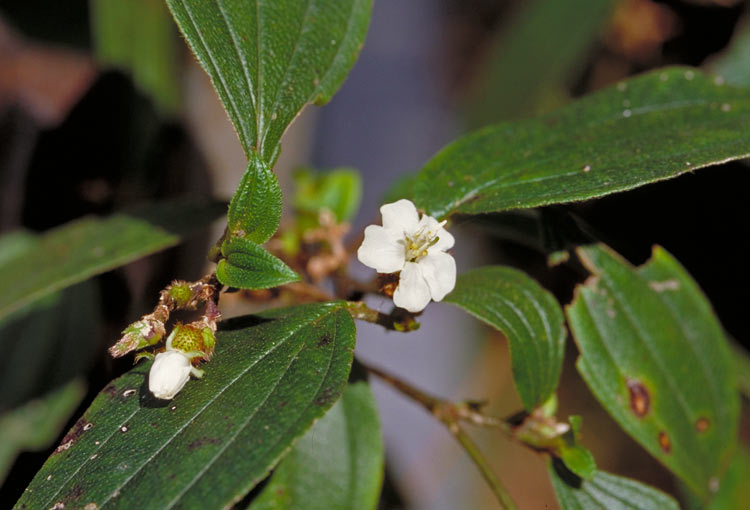
- Flower and foliage

Conservation status
- Least Concern (NCA)

Scientific classification
- Kingdom: Plantae
- Clade: Tracheophytes
- Clade: Angiosperms
- Clade: Eudicots
- Clade: Rosids
- Order: Myrtales
- Family: Melastomataceae
- Genus: Melastoma
- Species: M. cyanoides

Binomial name
- Melastoma cyanoides Sm.

Synonyms
- 29 synonyms: Lachnopodium bracteatum Blume; Lachnopodium rubrolimbatum Blume; Malabathris cyanoides Raf.; Malabathris nigra Raf.; Melastoma furcatum Roxb.; Melastoma moluccanum Blume; Melastoma rubrolimbatum Link & Otto; Osbeckia annamica Guillaumin; Osbeckia manillana DC.; Osbeckia papuana Cogn.; Otanthera adpressa Mansf.; Otanthera bracteata Korth.; Otanthera celebica Blume; Otanthera crinita Naudin; Otanthera cyanoides Triana; Otanthera gracilis Naudin; Otanthera lamii Mansf.; Otanthera macgregorii Merr.; Otanthera manillana Triana; Otanthera moluccana (Blume) Blume; Otanthera nicobarensis Teijsm. & Binn.; Otanthera novoguineensis Baker f.; Otanthera papuana (Cogn.) C.Hansen; Otanthera parviflora Merr.; Otanthera queenslandica Domin; Otanthera rubro-limbata Triana; Otanthera setulosa K.Schum.; Otanthera strigosa Merr.; Otanthera subrostrata Bakh.f.

= Melastoma cyanoides =

Bush strawberry

Species of flowering plant

Melastoma cyanoides, commonly known as bush strawberry, is a species of plants in the family Melastomataceae native to parts of Indo-China, Malesia, New Guinea and the state of Queensland, Australia. It is a shrub to about 2 m (6 ft 7 in) tall with white flowers and red, spiky-looking fruit. It grows in and on the margins of rainforest; in Australia is occurs from sea level up to about 700 m (2,300 ft). The species was first described by botanist James Edward Smith in 1819, based on a collection from Ambon in Indonesia.

== Conservation ==
This species is listed as least concern under the Queensland Government's Nature Conservation Act. As of 8 January 2025, it has not been assessed by the International Union for Conservation of Nature (IUCN).
