= Ategumia nalotalis =

Scientific classification
- Kingdom: Animalia
- Phylum: Arthropoda
- Class: Insecta
- Order: Lepidoptera
- Family: Crambidae
- Genus: Ategumia
- Species: A. nalotalis

Binomial name
- Ategumia nalotalis (Schaus, 1924)

Synonyms
- Pilocrocis nalotalis Schaus, 1924

Species of moth

Ategumia nalotalis is a moth in the family Crambidae. It was described by Schaus in 1924. It is found in Ecuador.

The wingspan is about 30 mm. The forewings are dark purple drab with yellow markings. The hindwings are yellow, the lines and termen broadly cupreous dark purple drab.
