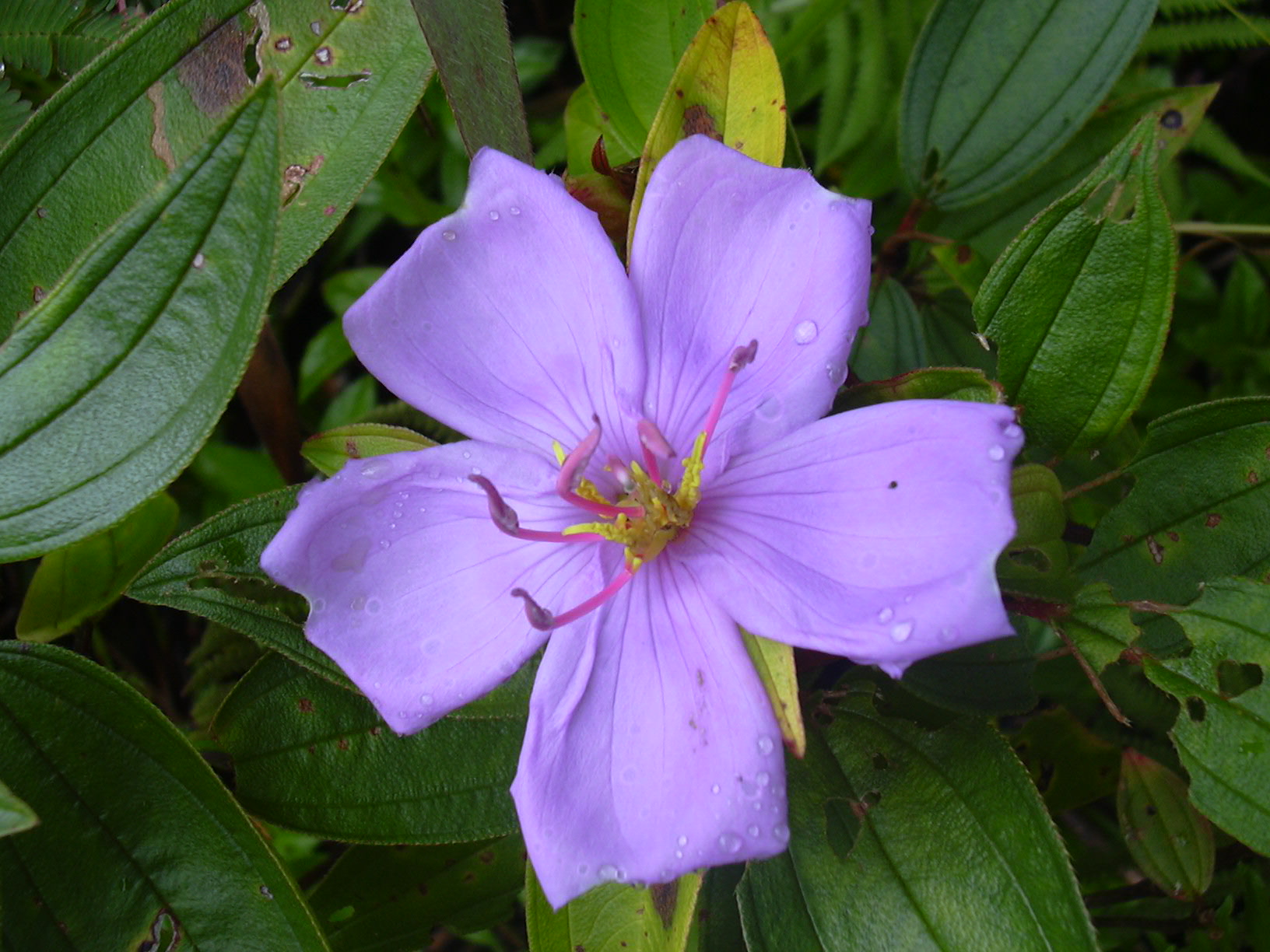
- Melastoma candidum

Scientific classification
- Kingdom: Plantae
- Clade: Embryophytes
- Clade: Tracheophytes
- Clade: Spermatophytes
- Clade: Angiosperms
- Clade: Eudicots
- Clade: Rosids
- Order: Myrtales
- Family: Melastomataceae
- Genus: Melastoma; Blume

Species
- See text

= Melastoma =

Genus of flowering plants

Melastoma is a genus in the family Melastomataceae. It has over 100 species distributed around Southeast Asia, India, north to Japan, south to Australia and the Pacific Islands. The number of species should probably be reduced according to some sources. Many species have been planted around the world for the aesthetic value of their bright purple flowers.

Species in this genus are native to temperate and tropical Asia, Seychelles, Pacific and Australasia. Several have the capacity to become invasive species, in Hawaii and other areas.

== Description ==
At least one species contains sphaeraphides. They were found in abundance in the endophloem and mesophloem, but none occurred in the bark or leaves.

== Species ==
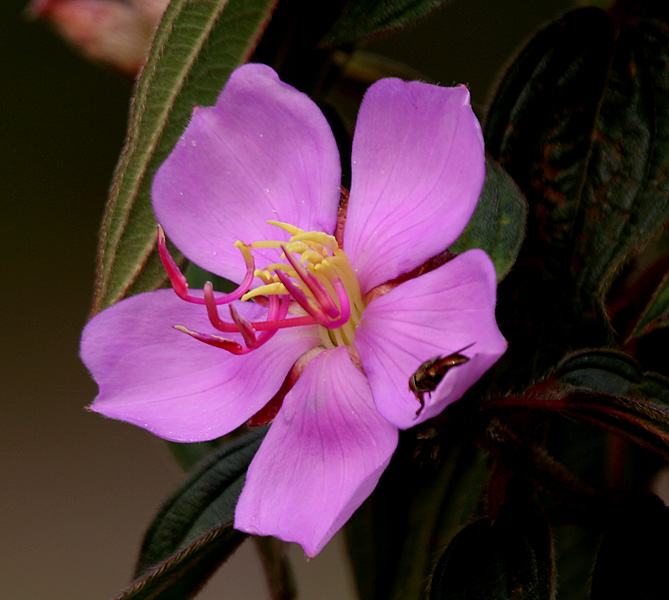
Melastoma sp., W. Bengal

As of November 2020, Plants of the World Online (PoWO) accepted the following species. An additional species, Melastoma malabituin, was described in 2020.

- Melastoma aculeolatum Bakh.f.
- Melastoma affine D.Don
- Melastoma ansowii K.M.Wong
- Melastoma apiense K.M.Wong
- Melastoma ariffinii K.M.Wong
- Melastoma ashtonii K.M.Wong
- Melastoma atrofuscum Bakh.f.
- Melastoma aureum Bakh.f.
- Melastoma barioense K.M.Wong
- Melastoma bauchei Guillaumin
- Melastoma beccarianum Cogn.
- Melastoma bensonii Merr.
- Melastoma borijanum Korth.
- Melastoma borneense Bakh.f.
- Melastoma botryanthum K.M.Wong
- Melastoma buennemeyeri Bakh.f.
- Melastoma bukitrayense K.M.Wong
- Melastoma celebicum Blume
- Melastoma ceramense Naudin
- Melastoma chevalieri Guillaumin
- Melastoma collinum K.M.Wong
- Melastoma culionense Merr.
- Melastoma curvisepalum Bakh.f.
- Melastoma cyanoides Sm.
- Melastoma decipiens Bakh.f.
- Melastoma denticulatum Labill.
- Melastoma dodecandrum Lour. - dì niè (Chinese: 地菍) or de rěn (Chinese: 地稔)
- Melastoma eberhardtii Guillaumin
- Melastoma elbertii Bakh.f.
- Melastoma godeffroyi Reinecke
- Melastoma griffithianum Masters
- Melastoma hansenii K.M.Wong
- Melastoma harmsianum Lauterb.
- Melastoma horridum Bakh.f.
- Melastoma iliasii K.M.Wong
- Melastoma imbricatum Wall. ex Triana - senduduk Putih, senggani putih
- Melastoma impressinervium K.M.Wong
- Melastoma incisum K.M.Wong
- Melastoma × intermedium Dunn
- Melastoma jenkinsii Masters
- Melastoma joffrei K.M.Wong & Y.W.Low
- Melastoma kahayanense K.M.Wong
- Melastoma kemamanense L.Neo & K.M.Wong
- Melastoma klossii Baker f.
- Melastoma koordersii Bakh.f.
- Melastoma kostermansii K.M.Wong
- Melastoma kuchingense K.M.Wong
- Melastoma kudoi Sasaki
- Melastoma lanuginosum Blume
- Melastoma linusii K.M.Wong
- Melastoma longiramense K.M.Wong
- Melastoma magnificum Bakh.f.
- Melastoma malabathricum L. (many synonyms, some recognized as separate species by some sources, including Melastoma affine D.Don and Melastoma septemnervium Lour.) - Malabar melastome, Singapore rhododendron, senduduk, senggani
- Melastoma malabituin J.Agcaoili, Barcelona & Pelser
- Melastoma maraiparaiense K.M.Wong
- Melastoma micans Gilli
- Melastoma microlepidotum K.M.Wong
- Melastoma microphyllum Naudin
- Melastoma minahassae Koord. ex Karst.Mey.
- Melastoma molkenboerii Miq.
- Melastoma molle Wall. ex Cogn.
- Melastoma muticum Ridl.
- Melastoma oreophilum K.M.Wong
- Melastoma oresbium K.M.Wong
- Melastoma orientale Guillaumin
- Melastoma ovalifolium Bakh.f.
- Melastoma paleaceum Naudin
- Melastoma palungense K.M.Wong
- Melastoma patulisetum Ohwi
- Melastoma pellegrinianum (H.Boissieu) Karst.Mey.
- Melastoma penicillatum Naudin
- Melastoma pentapetalum (Toyoda) T.Yamaz. & Toyoda
- Melastoma picklesii K.M.Wong
- Melastoma porphyraeum Zipp. ex Blume
- Melastoma postarii K.M.Wong
- Melastoma praetermissum K.M.Wong
- Melastoma pubescens Bakh.f.
- Melastoma pulongtauense K.M.Wong
- Melastoma robustum Bakh.f.
- Melastoma roemeri Mansf.
- Melastoma runiae K.M.Wong
- Melastoma sabahense Karst.Mey.
- Melastoma saigonense (Kuntze) Merr.
- Melastoma sanguineum Sims - fox-tongued melastoma, blood-red melastoma, red melastome
- Melastoma sarawakense K.M.Wong
- Melastoma scaberrimum (Hayata) Yuen P.Yang & H.Y.Liu
- Melastoma septemnervium Lour.
- Melastoma sibatii K.M.Wong
- Melastoma suave Bakh.f.
- Melastoma subalbidum Merr.
- Melastoma subgrande Hochr.
- Melastoma sugaui K.M.Wong
- Melastoma sumatranum Bakh.f.
- Melastoma sylvaticum Blume
- Melastoma tanjiewhoei K.M.Wong
- Melastoma tetramerum Hayata
- Melastoma toppingii Merr.
- Melastoma trachycaulon Miq.
- Melastoma trachyphyllum Backer ex Bakh.f.
- Melastoma trungii Pócs & Tiep
- Melastoma ultramaficum K.M.Wong
- Melastoma velutinosum Ridl.
- Melastoma vile Bakh.f.
- Melastoma vulcanicum Ridl.
- Melastoma yahudii K.M.Wong
- Melastoma yiianthum K.M.Wong
- Melastoma zollingeri Naudin

== Bibliography ==
- Gulliver, George (1864). "Observations on Raphides and other Crystals". The Annals and Magazine of Natural History, Including Zoology, Botany, and Geology. Third Series. 14: 250–252.
