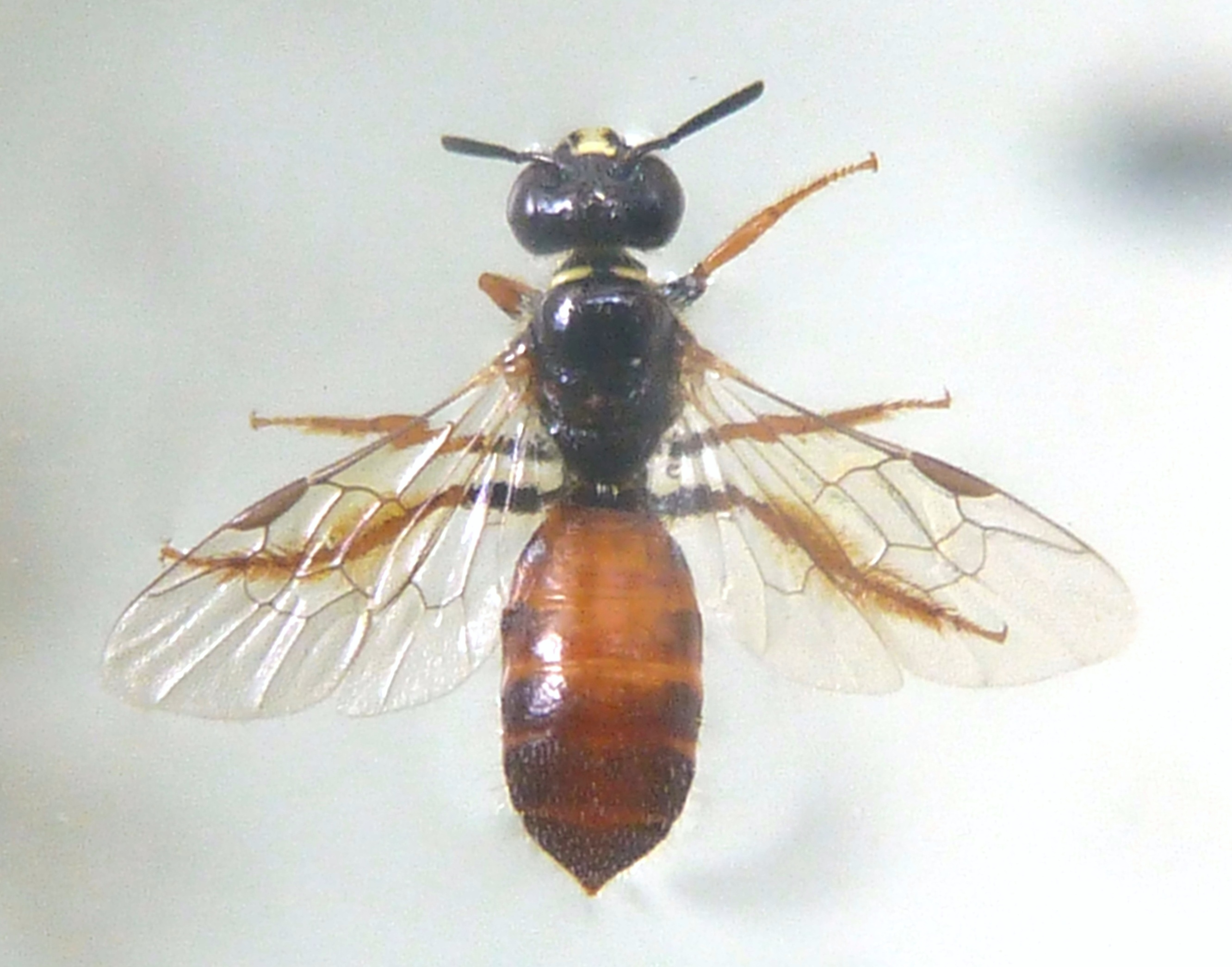

Scientific classification
- Kingdom: Animalia
- Phylum: Arthropoda
- Class: Insecta
- Order: Hymenoptera
- Family: Apidae
- Tribe: Allodapini
- Genus: Allodapula; Cockerell, 1934

Species
- see text

= Allodapula =

Genus of bees

Allodapula is a genus of bees in the family Apidae, subfamily Xylocopinae. They are similar in appearance, around 7mm in length, with swarthy head and thorax, contrasting with the brown abdomen. After the removal of a number of former species into other genera, the genus as presently defined occurs only in Africa.

== Biology ==
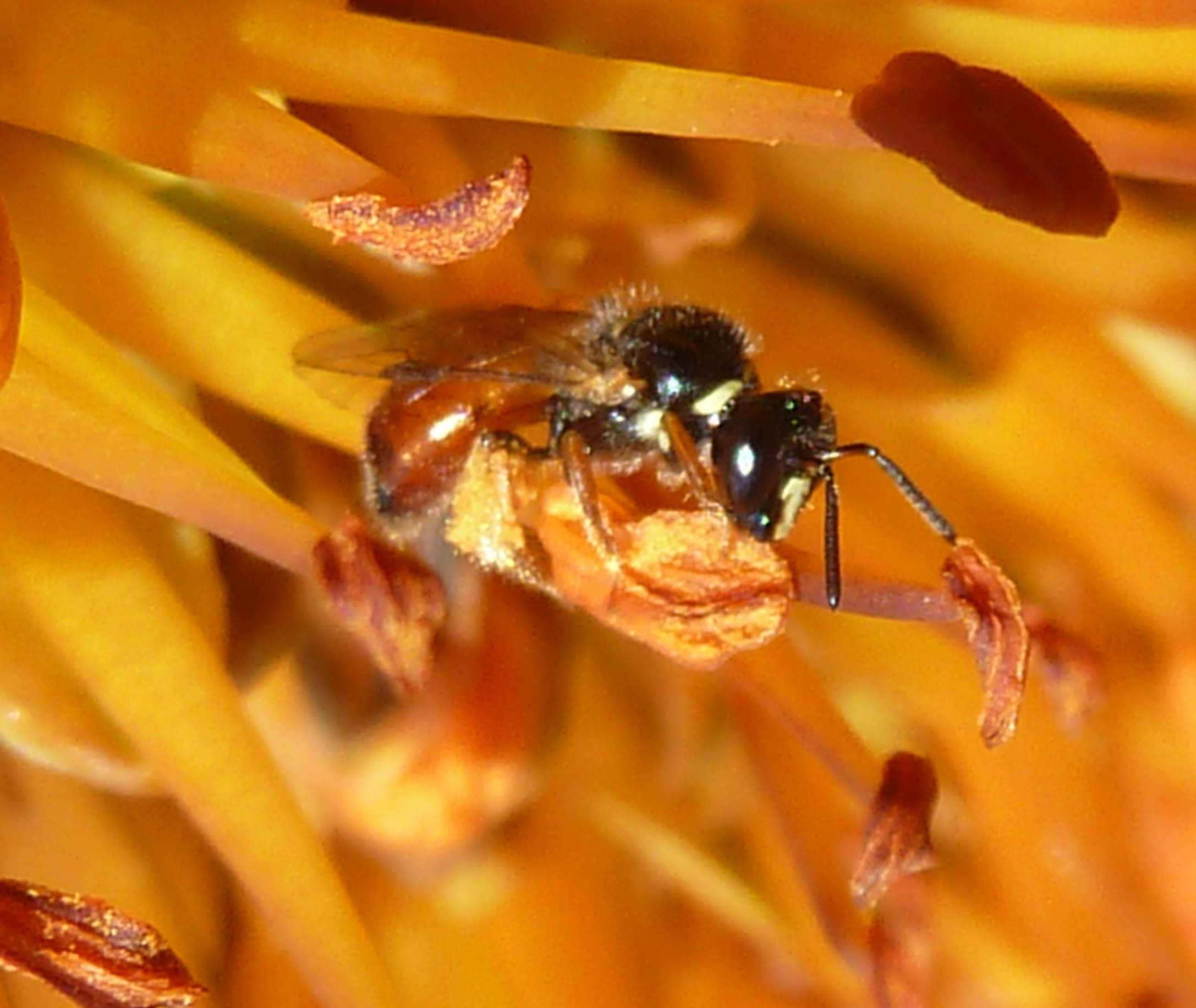
Allodapula sp. collecting Aloe pollen

The nest is inside a hollow weed or shrub stalk, and the tip of the abdomen is used to close off the nest entrance. A set of eggs is laid inside the plant stalk, in quick succession, so as to hatch together. They are placed at about the same height, above the bottom of the nest. The larvae are fed on pollen, which like other bees, is carried on hairs of the hind pair of legs. The larvae are mostly fed progressively, but being clumped together, they feed on a common food mass.

== Species ==
- Allodapula acutigera Cockerell, 1936
- Allodapula brunnescens (Cockerell, 1934)
- Allodapula dichroa (Strand, 1915)
- Allodapula empeyi Michener, 1975
- Allodapula guillarmodi Michener, 1970
- Allodapula hessei Michener, 1971
- Allodapula jucunda (Smith, 1879)
- Allodapula maculithorax Michener, 1971
- Allodapula melanopus (Cameron, 1905)
- Allodapula monticola (Cockerell, 1933)
- Allodapula ornaticeps Michener, 1971
- Allodapula palliceps (Friese, 1924)
- Allodapula rozeni Michener, 1975
- Allodapula turneri (Cockerell, 1934)
- Allodapula variegata (Smith, 1854)
- Allodapula xerica Michener, 1971
