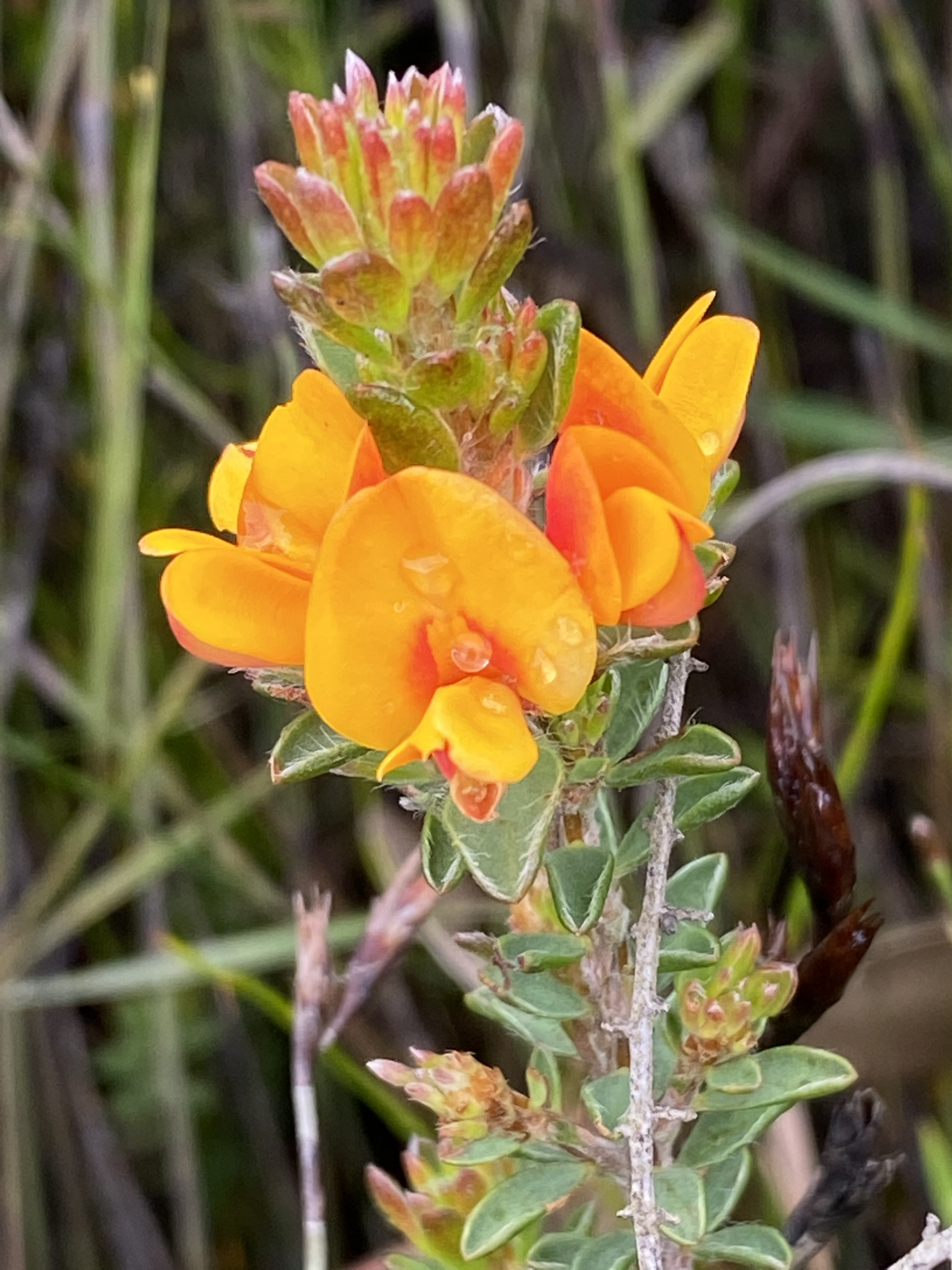

Scientific classification
- Kingdom: Plantae
- Clade: Tracheophytes
- Clade: Angiosperms
- Clade: Eudicots
- Clade: Rosids
- Order: Fabales
- Family: Fabaceae
- Subfamily: Faboideae
- Genus: Pultenaea
- Species: P. tuberculata

Binomial name
- Pultenaea tuberculata Pers.

Synonyms
- Pultenaea elliptica Sm.; Pultenaea elliptica Sm. var. elliptica; Pultenaea elliptica var. oblongifolia Sieber ex DC.; Pultenaea elliptica var. thymifolia (Sieber ex DC.) Benth.; Pultenaea hypolampra Sieber ex DC.; Pultenaea sp. H; Pultenaea thymifolia Sieber ex DC.

= Pultenaea tuberculata =

Species of legume

Pultenaea tuberculata, commonly known as the wreath bush-pea, is a flowering plant in the family Fabaceae. It has yellow and red pea flowers and is endemic to Australia.

== Description ==
Pultenaea tuberculata is a spreading to upright shrub to 1 m (3 ft 3 in) high, soft with curly hairs on the stems that are obscured by stipules. The leaves are arranged alternately, crowded, narrowly elliptic to narrow egg-shaped, spathulate, flat to concave, mostly 3.2–15 mm (0.13–0.59 in) wide, 1.5–5 mm (0.059–0.197 in) wide. The leaf apex either pointed or rounded, rarely aristate, margins curved inward, upper surface lighter green than underside, stipules 3–6.5 mm (0.12–0.26 in) long. The inflorescence are borne at the end of stems, mostly in dense, leafy clusters, individual flowers 10–16 mm (0.39–0.63 in) long, orange-yellow with red markings on a pedicel 0.5–1.5 mm (0.020–0.059 in) long, bracteoles 4–7 mm (0.16–0.28 in) long, hairy and joined to the stipules just below the apex, calyx 7.5–8 mm (0.30–0.31 in) long. Flowering occurs from September to February and the fruit is a swollen pod about 5 mm (0.20 in) long.

== Taxonomy and naming ==
Pultenaea tuberculata was first formally described in 1805 by Christiaan Hendrik Persoon and the description was published in Synopsis plantarum, seu enchiridium botanicum, complectens enumerationem systematicam specierum. The specific epithet (tuberculata) means "tuberculate" or "covered with small warty lumps".

== Distribution and habitat ==
Wreath bush-pea grows in relatively high rainfall areas, on dry sclerophyll forest, scrub and heathland on sandstone from Lake Macquarie in the north to Bermagui in the south.
