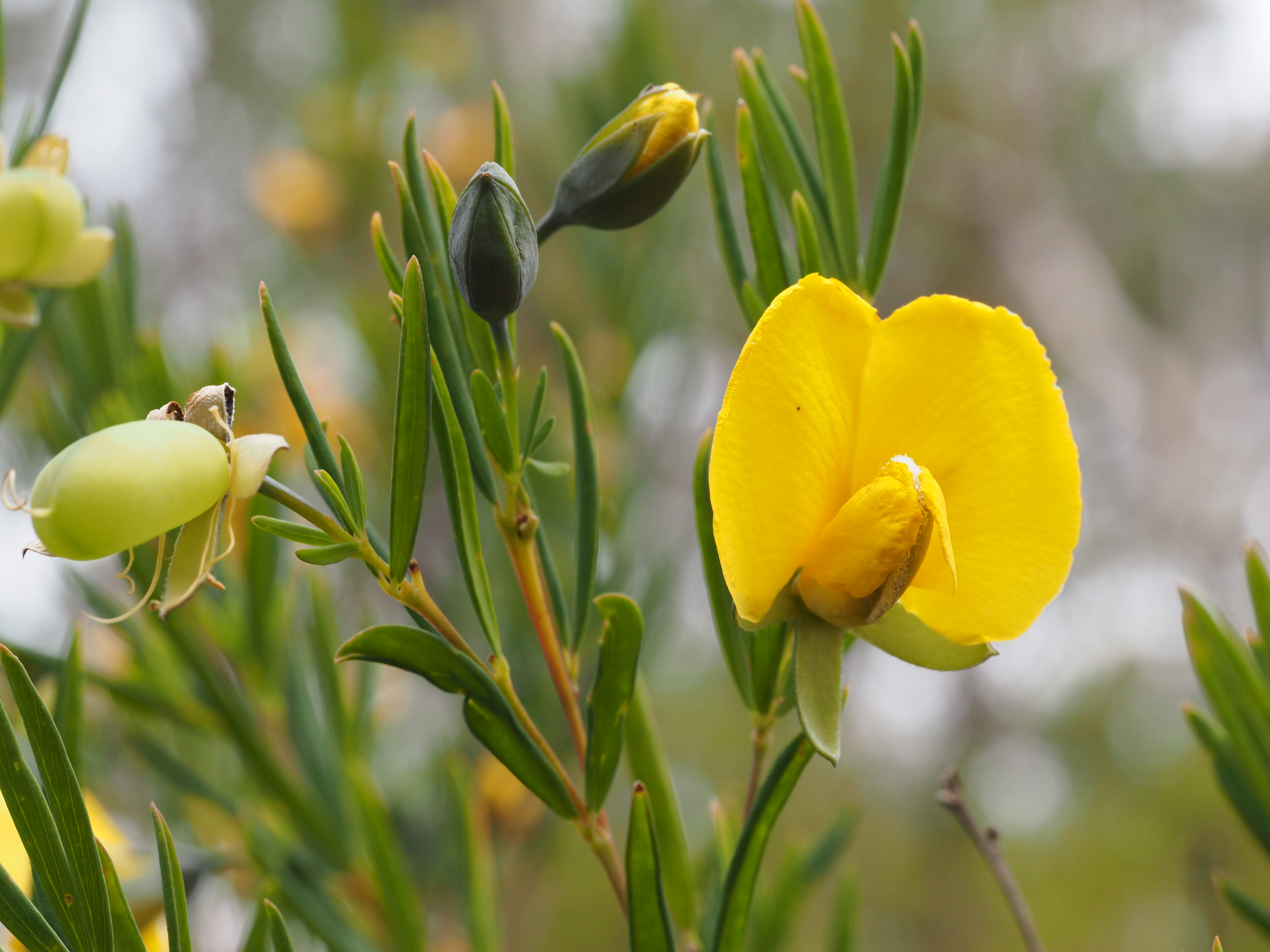
- Leaves and flowers

Scientific classification
- Kingdom: Plantae
- Clade: Tracheophytes
- Clade: Angiosperms
- Clade: Eudicots
- Clade: Rosids
- Order: Fabales
- Family: Fabaceae
- Subfamily: Faboideae
- Genus: Gompholobium
- Species: G. latifolium

Binomial name
- Gompholobium latifolium Sm.

Synonyms
- Gompholobium barbigerum DC.; Gompholobium fimbriatum Sm. nom. illeg., nom. superfl.; Gompholobium fimbriatum Sieber ex DC. nom. inval., pro syn.; Gompholobium psoraleaefolium Salisb. orth. var.; Gompholobium psoraleifolium Salisb.

= Gompholobium latifolium =

Species of legume

Gompholobium latifolium, commonly known as golden glory pea or giant wedge-pea, is a flowering plant in the pea family (Fabaceae) and is endemic to eastern Australia. It is a small shrub with leaves composed of three leaflets and which has relatively large yellow flowers in spring and early summer.

== Description ==
Gompholobium latifolium is an erect, glabrous shrub that typically grows to a height of up to 3 m (9.8 ft). Its leaves are composed of three linear to lance-shaped leaflets which are mostly 25–50 millimetres (1–2 in) long and 2–6 millimetres (0.08–0.2 in) wide. The leaves have a very short stalk and are darker on the upper surface.

The flowers are yellow and are arranged singly or in groups of up to three in leaf axils or on the ends of the branches on a pedicel about 10 mm (0.4 in) long. The five sepals are about 12 mm (0.5 in) long and are only joined near their base. They are lance-shaped, dark green and glabrous on the outside and covered with flattened, matted hairs on the inside. The standard petal is 20–30 mm (0.8–1 in) long and the keel is sometimes greenish but is always densely hairy along its edge with the hairs up to 1 mm (0.04 in) long. Flowering mostly occurs from September to November and is followed by the fruit which is an oval to roughly spherical legume up to 18 mm (0.7 in) long and 10 millimetres (0.4 in) wide containing twelve to fifteen brownish, kidney-shaped seeds.

== Taxonomy and naming ==
Gompholobium latifolium was first formally described in 1805 by James Edward Smith and the description was published in Annals of Botany. The specific epithet (latifolium) is from the Latin words latus meaning "broad" and folium meaning "a leaf", referring to the broad leaves.

== Distribution and habitat ==
Golden glory pea grows in dry sclerophyll forest in Queensland, New South Wales and Victoria in sandy soil. It is most common in New South Wales, where it is widespread along the coast and nearby ranges. It is uncommon in Victoria.

== Uses ==
Although a desirable horticultural species with its large yellow pea flowers, G. latifolium is uncommon in gardens. It can be propagated easily from seed but viable seeds are often hard to obtain. The seeds must be boiled or scratched before they will germinate.

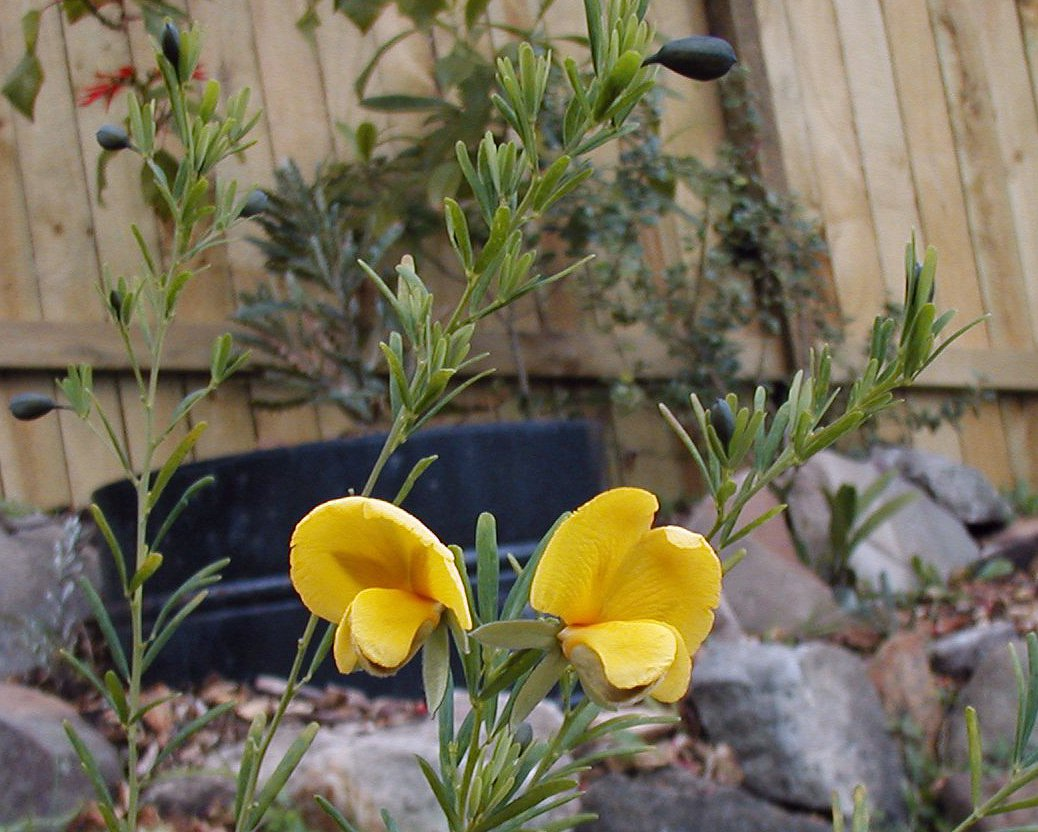
Garden specimen

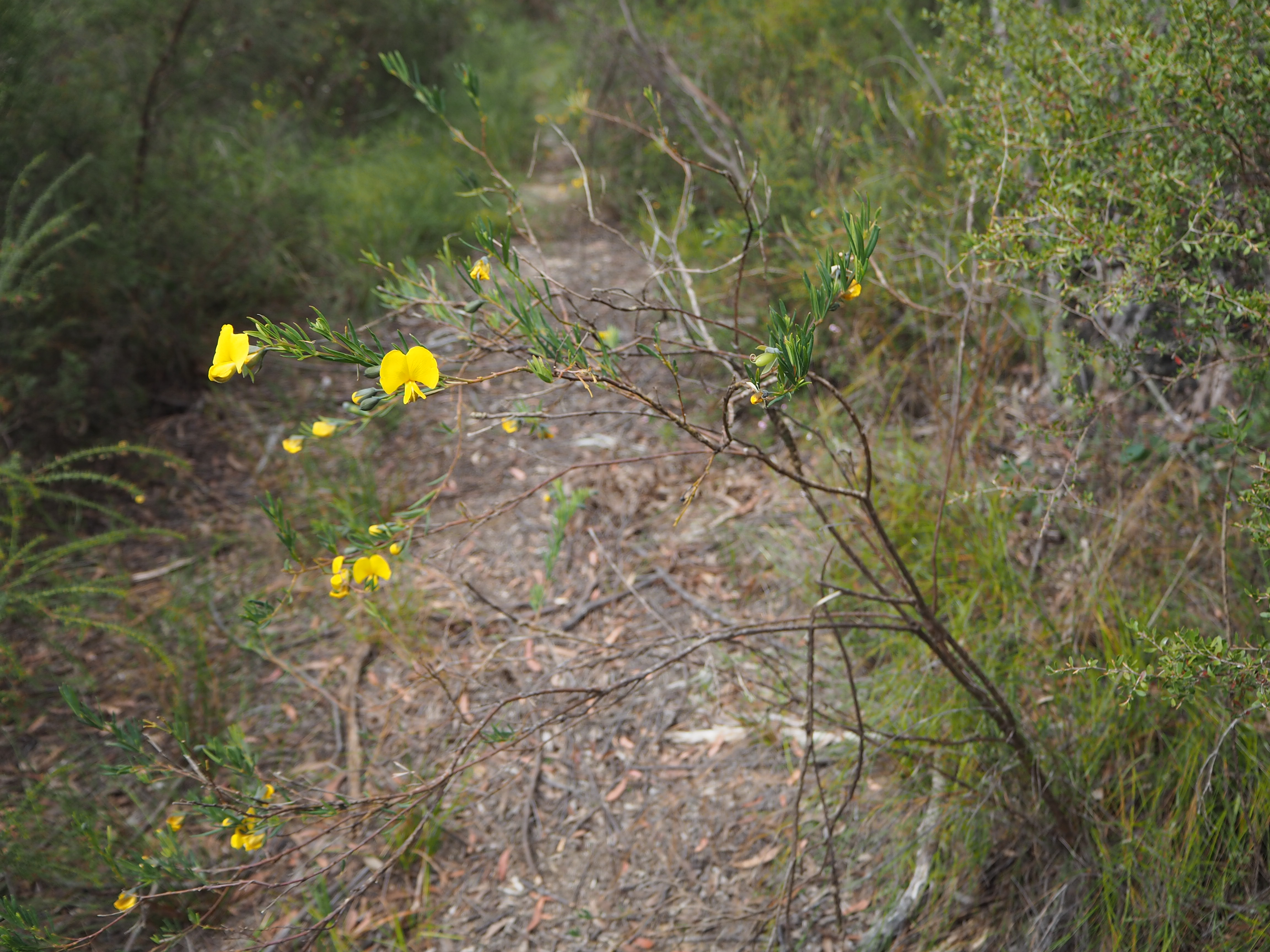
In the Gibraltar Range National Park

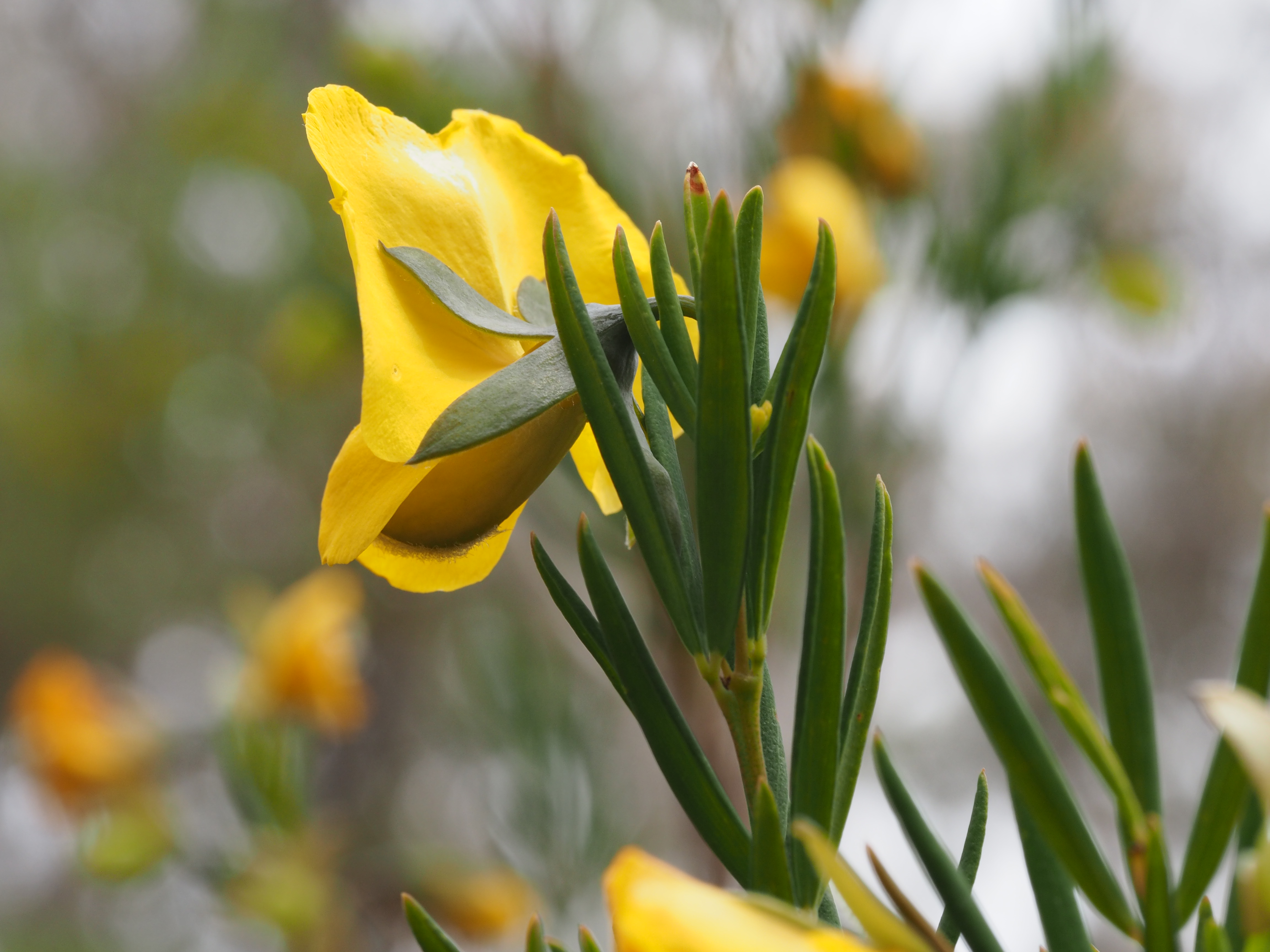
The long sepals
