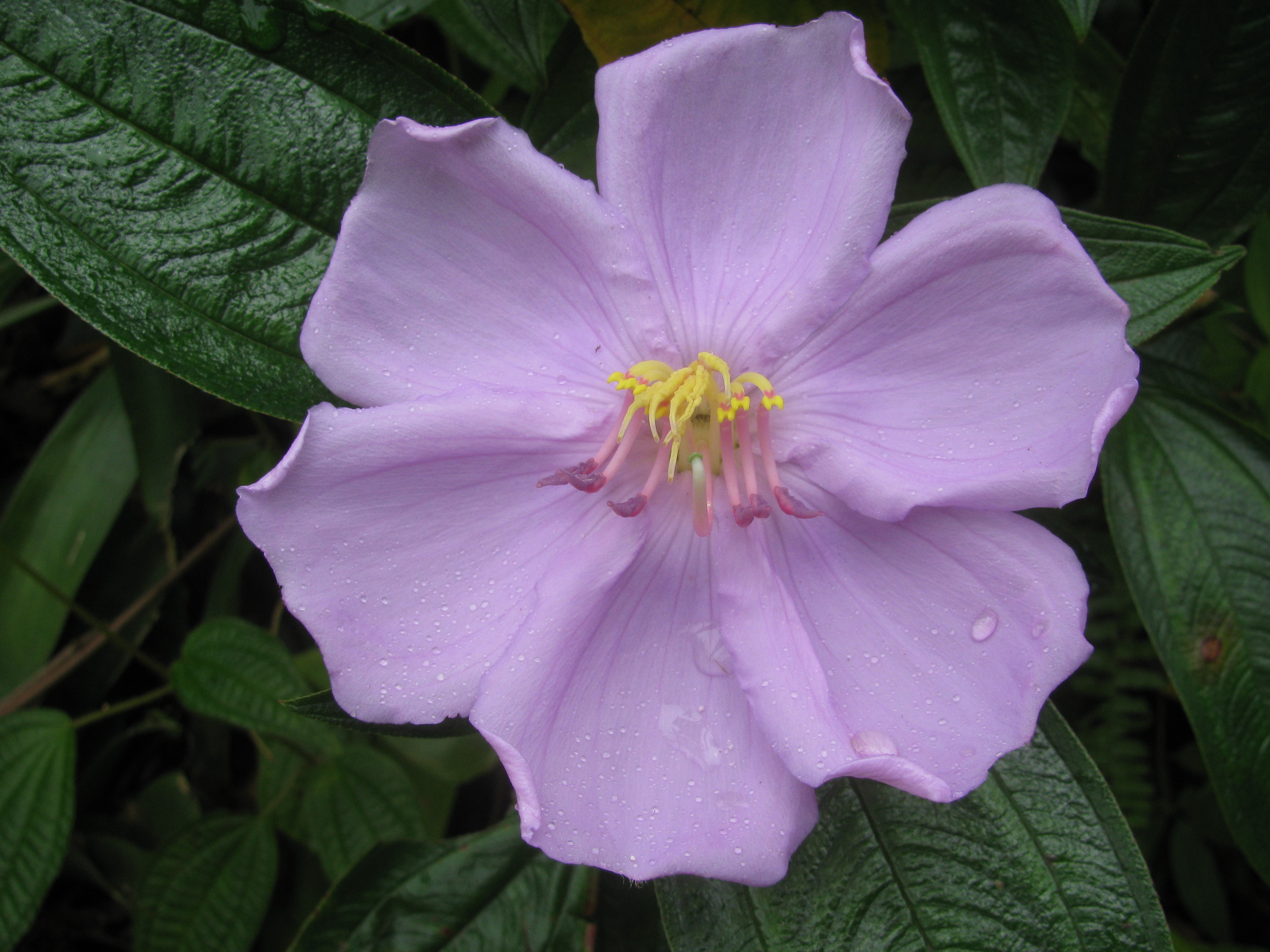

Scientific classification
- Kingdom: Plantae
- Clade: Tracheophytes
- Clade: Angiosperms
- Clade: Eudicots
- Clade: Rosids
- Order: Myrtales
- Family: Melastomataceae
- Genus: Melastoma
- Species: M. sanguineum

Binomial name
- Melastoma sanguineum Sims

= Melastoma sanguineum =

Species of tree

Melastoma sanguineum is called red melastome or fox-tongued melastoma in English. They are erect shrubs or small slender trees with medium-sized violet-pink colored flowers with 6 petals that have made them attractive for cultivation. The leaves have the 5 distinctive longitudinal veins (nerves) typical of plants in the family Melastomataceae.

== Description ==
Melastoma sanguineum are erect shrubs or small trees up to 2 to 4 m tall. Leaves are ovate-lanceolate 10 to 20 cm long.

Fruit in the form of berries 15 mm long with 6 cells and many small seeds. Chromosome number 2n = 56.

== Distribution ==
Native to Malay Peninsula, Java, Sumatra, Vietnam, and southern China. Occasionally cultivated in Hawaii. Naturalized populations have escaped cultivation and are spreading on Hawaii Island in the Keaukaha area and on the highway from Hawaii Volcanoes National Park to Hilo.

== Taxonomy ==
Melastoma sanguineum was first described by John Sims in 1821 (Botanical Magazine 48: pl. 2241).
