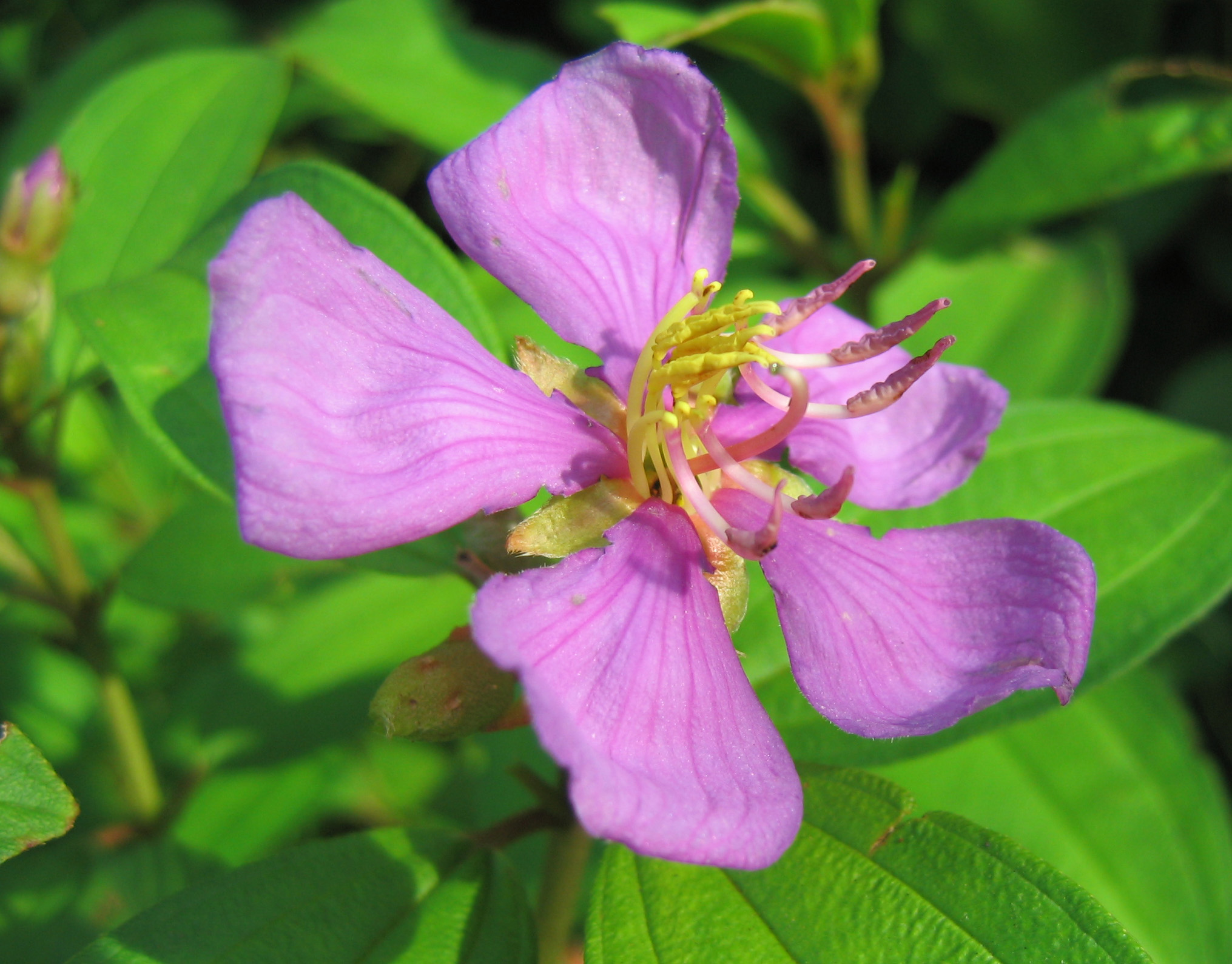

Scientific classification
- Kingdom: Plantae
- Clade: Tracheophytes
- Clade: Angiosperms
- Clade: Eudicots
- Clade: Rosids
- Order: Myrtales
- Family: Melastomataceae
- Genus: Melastoma
- Species: M. malabathricum

Binomial name
- Melastoma malabathricum L.

Synonyms
- Melastoma affine D.; Melastoma candidum D. Don; Melastoma cavaleriei H. Lév. & Vaniot; Melastoma esquirolii H. Lév.; Melastoma malabathricum var. normale (D. Don) R.C. Srivast.; Melastoma malabathricum subsp. normale (D. Don) K.Mey.; Melastoma normale D. Don; Melastoma polyanthum Blume

= Melastoma malabathricum =

Species of flowering plant

Melastoma malabathricum, known also as Malabar melastome, Indian rhododendron, Singapore rhododendron, planter's rhododendron and senduduk, is a flowering plant in the family Melastomataceae native to Seychelles, tropical and subtropical Asia to Australia and western Pacific islands. Despite its common names, it does not have any connection to actual rhododendrons, and belongs to the Rosids clade as opposed to the Asterids clade. This plant is usually found at elevations between 100 m and 2,800 m in grassland and sparse forest habitats. It has been used as a medicinal plant in certain parts of the world, but has been declared a noxious weed in the United States. M. malabathricum is a known hyperaccumulator of aluminium, and as such can be used for phytoremediation.

== Taxonomy ==
The taxonomy of the genus Melastoma requires a complete revision. Early genetics studies were published from 2001, through 2013, but a revision based on them has yet to be. In 2001 Karsten Meyer proposed a revision in which the species Melastoma affine and other species were subsumed within this species M. malabathricum.

In Australia, currently most authorities do not accept this; instead the naturally occurring populations in Western Australia, Northern Territory, Queensland and north eastern New South Wales remain recognised as M. affine, except by authorities in Queensland. Australian populations which occur as weeds, having different flowers, for example in Warraroon Reserve, Lane Cove, Sydney, further south than the natural distribution of M. affine, are introduced plants of this M. malabathricum L. species.

== Description ==
M. malabathricum grows wild on a wide range of soils, from sea-level up to an altitude of 3000 meters. It is an erect, free-flowering shrub that grows to a height of about 3 meters. The plant is branched, and has reddish stems that are covered with bristly scales and minute hairs. Its leaves are simple, elliptic lanceolate with a rounded base, are up to 7 cm long, and have three distinct main veins running from base to apex. Its flowers are borne on short terminal cymes 2 to 8 cm across. The flowers are pink, violet or mauve. Its fruit is a berry, which when ripe breaks irregularly to expose its soft, dark blue pulp and orange seeds.
