= AUSCAR =

AUSCAR may refer to:

- Australian Seed Conservation and Research, an Australian network of agencies involved in native plant conservation
- Australian Stock Car Auto Racing, an auto racing sanctioning body
