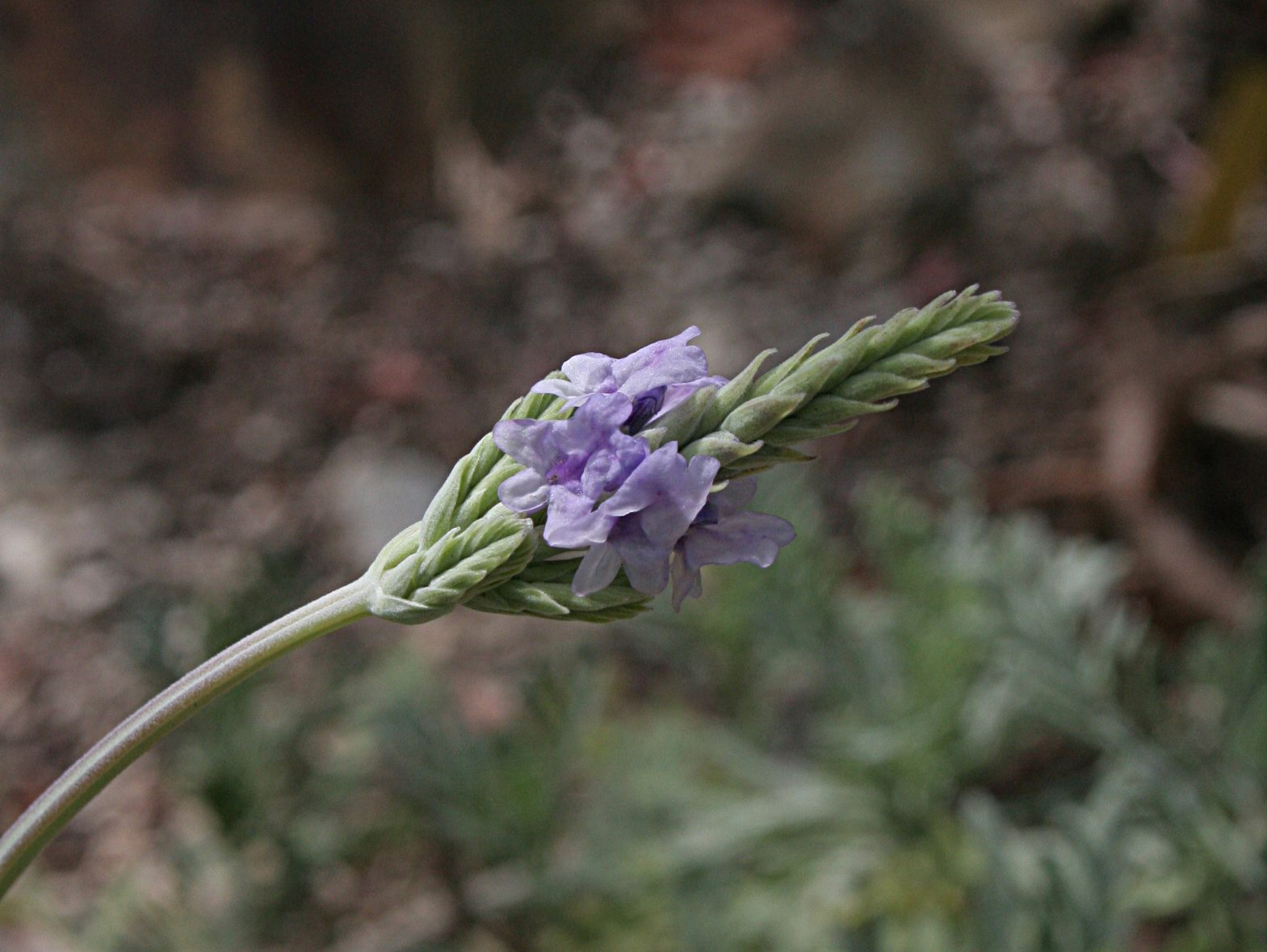
- inflorescence

Scientific classification
- Kingdom: Plantae
- Clade: Tracheophytes
- Clade: Angiosperms
- Clade: Eudicots
- Clade: Asterids
- Order: Lamiales
- Family: Lamiaceae
- Genus: Lavandula
- Species: L. pinnata

Binomial name
- Lavandula pinnata Lundmark

= Lavandula pinnata =

Species of plant

Lavandula pinnata (also known as fernleaf lavender and jagged lavender) is a species of flowering plant in the mint family, Lamiaceae, native to southern Madeira and the Canary Islands (Lanzarote). It was first described in 1780.

== Description ==
Lavandula pinnata is a shrub growing between 18 and 24 inches in height, with opposite, simple, pinnately dissected leaves, and square stems. Leaves are covered in fine white hairs, giving the plant a downy appearance. Flowers are deep violet in colour, with single or triple flower spikes, blooming from late spring to summer.

== Taxonomy ==
As of 4 February 2018, the original authorship of the name "Lavandula pinnata" varies by source. The World Checklist of Selected Plant Families attributes the name to Johan Daniel Lundmark in 1780, a view followed by The Plant List and Tropicos. GRIN Taxonomy and the African Plant Database attribute the name to the younger Carl Linnaeus (1780); the International Plant Names Index has the same attribution, but without a date, as well as noting the use of the name by Conrad Moench in 1802.
