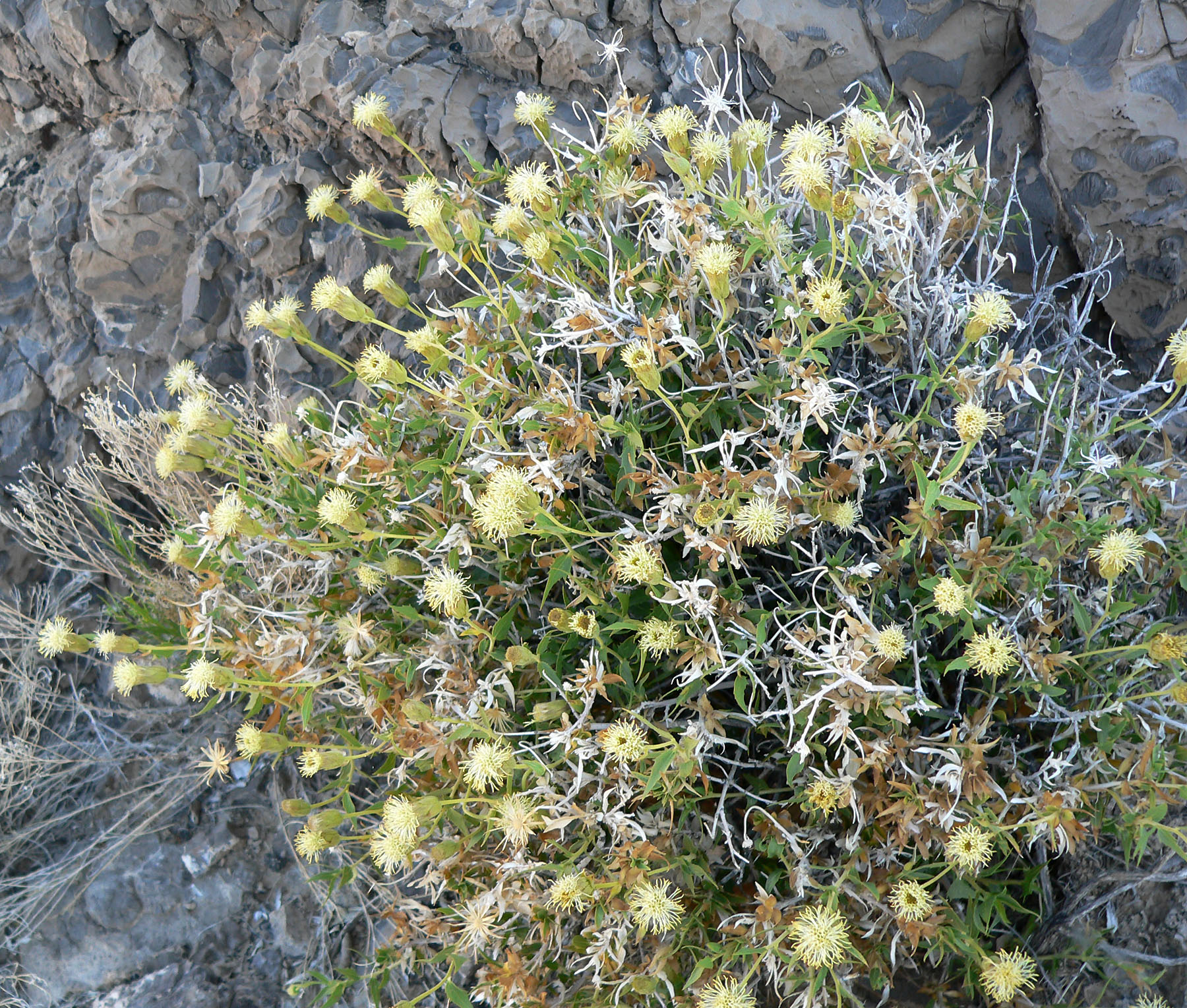

Scientific classification
- Kingdom: Plantae
- Clade: Tracheophytes
- Clade: Angiosperms
- Clade: Eudicots
- Clade: Asterids
- Order: Asterales
- Family: Asteraceae
- Genus: Brickellia
- Species: B. atractyloides

Binomial name
- Brickellia atractyloides A.Gray

Synonyms
- Coleosanthus atractylodes (A.Gray) Kuntze; Coleosanthus venulosus Nelson

= Brickellia atractyloides =

Species of flowering plant

Brickellia atractyloides is a North American species of flowering plant in the family Asteraceae known by the common name spearleaf brickellbush. It is native to the desert regions of the southwestern United States (Arizona, California, Nevada, Utah) and northwestern Mexico (Sonora, Baja California).

Brickellia atractyloides is a shrub up to 50 cm (20 inches) tall. It produces many small flower heads with cream-colored or pale green disc florets but no ray florets.

Varieties

- Brickellia atractyloides var. atractyloides - Arizona, California, Colorado, Nevada, Utah
- Brickellia atractyloides var. odontolepis (B.L.Rob.) Jeps. - California, Baja California, Sonora

Flora of North America lists a third variety, var. arguta, listed here as a distinct species, Brickellia arguta, as accepted by The Plant List.
