= Fordiophyton =

Scientific classification
- Kingdom: Plantae
- Clade: Embryophytes
- Clade: Tracheophytes
- Clade: Angiosperms
- Clade: Eudicots
- Clade: Rosids
- Order: Myrtales
- Family: Melastomataceae
- Genus: Fordiophyton; Stapf

Species
- See text

Synonyms
- Gymnagathis Stapf; Stapfiophyton Hui-Lin Li

Genus of flowering plants

Fordiophyton are a genus of flowering plants in the family Melastomataceae, native to Vietnam and southern China.

== Species ==
Species currently accepted by The Plant List are as follows:

- Fordiophyton brevicaule C. Chen
- Fordiophyton breviscapum (C. Chen) Y.F. Deng & T.L. Wu
- Fordiophyton cordifolium C.Y. Wu ex C. Chen
- Fordiophyton degeneratum (C. Chen) Y.F. Deng & T.L. Wu
- Fordiophyton faberi Stapf
- Fordiophyton longipes Y.C. Huang ex C. Chen
- Fordiophyton peperomiifolium (Oliv.) C. Hansen
- Fordiophyton repens Y.C. Huang ex C. Chen
- Fordiophyton strictum Diels
