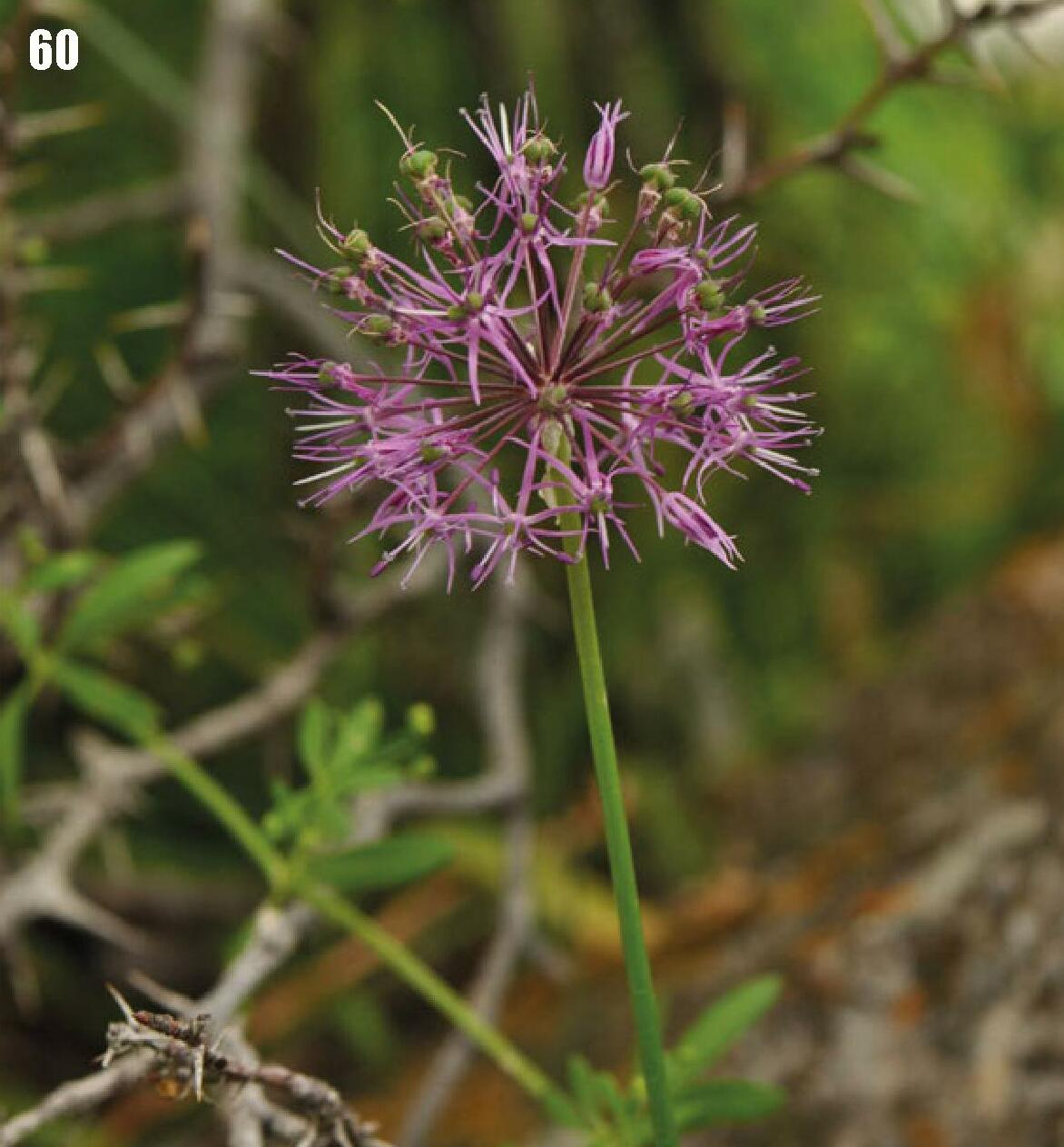

Scientific classification
- Kingdom: Plantae
- Clade: Tracheophytes
- Clade: Angiosperms
- Clade: Monocots
- Order: Asparagales
- Family: Amaryllidaceae
- Subfamily: Allioideae
- Genus: Allium
- Subgenus: Allium subg. Melanocrommyum
- Species: A. fetisowii

Binomial name
- Allium fetisowii Regel

Synonyms
- Allium simile Regel

= Allium fetisowii =

多籽蒜 duo zi suan Лук Фетисова

Species of flowering plant

Allium fetisowii is a plant species native to Kazakhstan, Uzbekistan, Xinjiang, Kyrgyzstan and Tajikistan in Central Asia.

Allium fetisowii produces a single round bulb up to 25 mm across. Scape is up to 70 tall, round in cross-section. Leaves are much shorter than the scape, but up to 15 mm wide. Flowers are reddish-purple.

Allium tschimganicum is native to Uzbekistan and Kyrgyzstan in Central Asia. Flora of China regards this name as synonymous with Allium fetisowii Regel. However, the Plant List accepts A. tschimganicum as a distinct species.
