= GSPC =

GSPC may refer to:

- Garden State Parkway Connector, a short spur of the New York State Thruway that connects to the Garden State Parkway at the New Jersey state line
- Global Strategy for Plant Conservation
- Groupe Salafiste pour la Prédication et le Combat (Salafist Group for Preaching and Combat), an Islamist militant organization now called al-Qaeda in the Islamic Maghreb
- Gujarat State Petroleum Corporation
- a ticker symbol for the S&P 500
