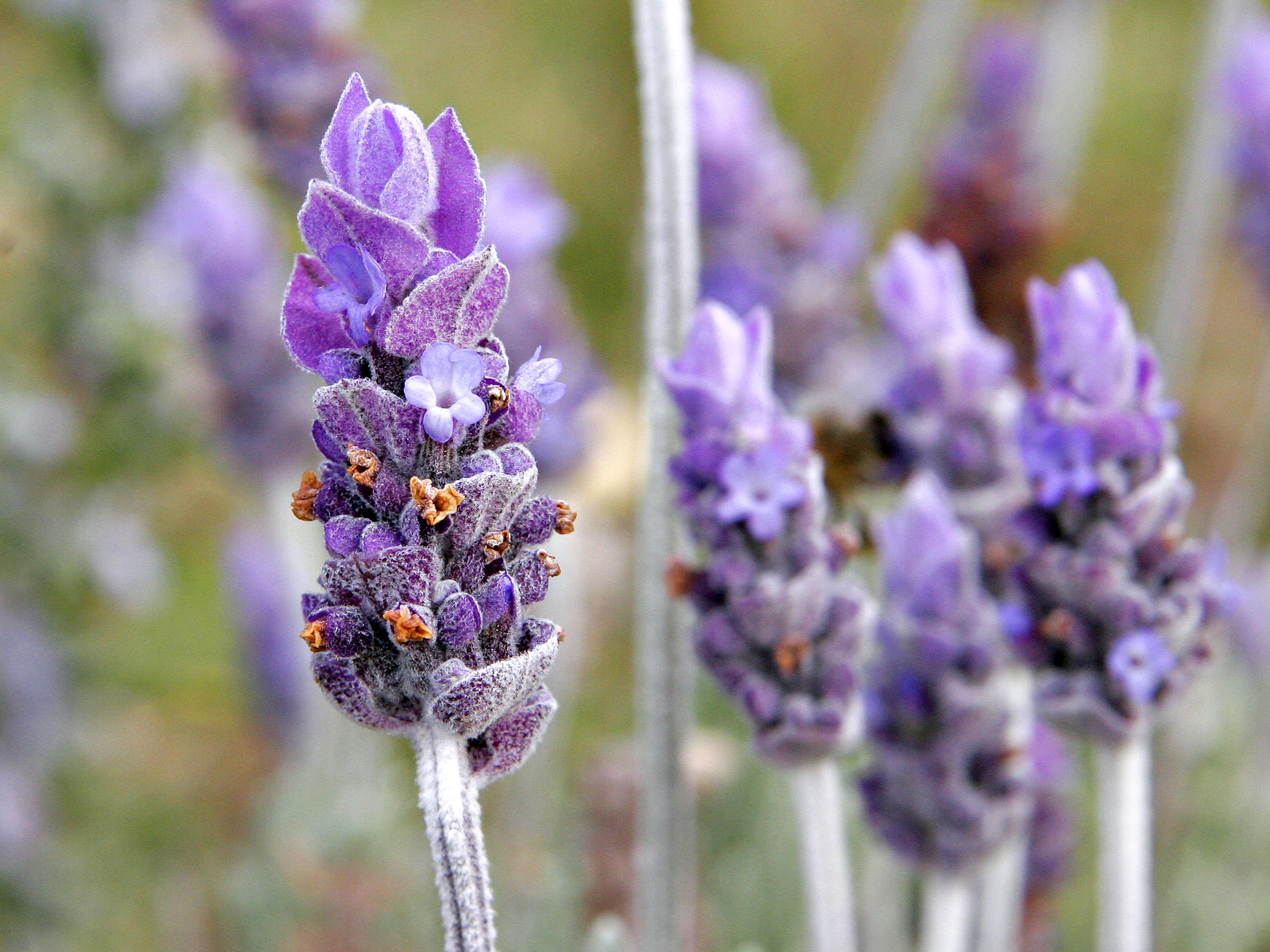
- Lavender flowers with bracts

Scientific classification
- Kingdom: Plantae
- Clade: Tracheophytes
- Clade: Angiosperms
- Clade: Eudicots
- Clade: Asterids
- Order: Lamiales
- Family: Lamiaceae
- Subfamily: Nepetoideae
- Tribe: Ocimeae
- Genus: Lavandula; L.

Type species
- Lavandula spica L.

Synonyms
- Stoechas Mill.; Fabricia Adans.; Styphonia Medik.; Chaetostachys Benth.; Sabaudia Buscal. & Muschl.; Isinia Rech.f.

= Lavandula =

Lavender

Genus of plants

Lavandula (common name lavender) is a genus of 47 known species of perennial flowering plants in the sage family, Lamiaceae. It is native to regions of the Iberian Peninsula and Mediterranean coastline (including the Adriatic coast and coastal North Africa), the Middle East, extending to the Indian subcontinent.

Many members of the genus are cultivated extensively in temperate climates as ornamental plants for garden and landscape use, for use as culinary herbs, and commercially for the extraction of essential oils. Lavender is used in traditional medicine and as an ingredient in cosmetics.

== Description ==
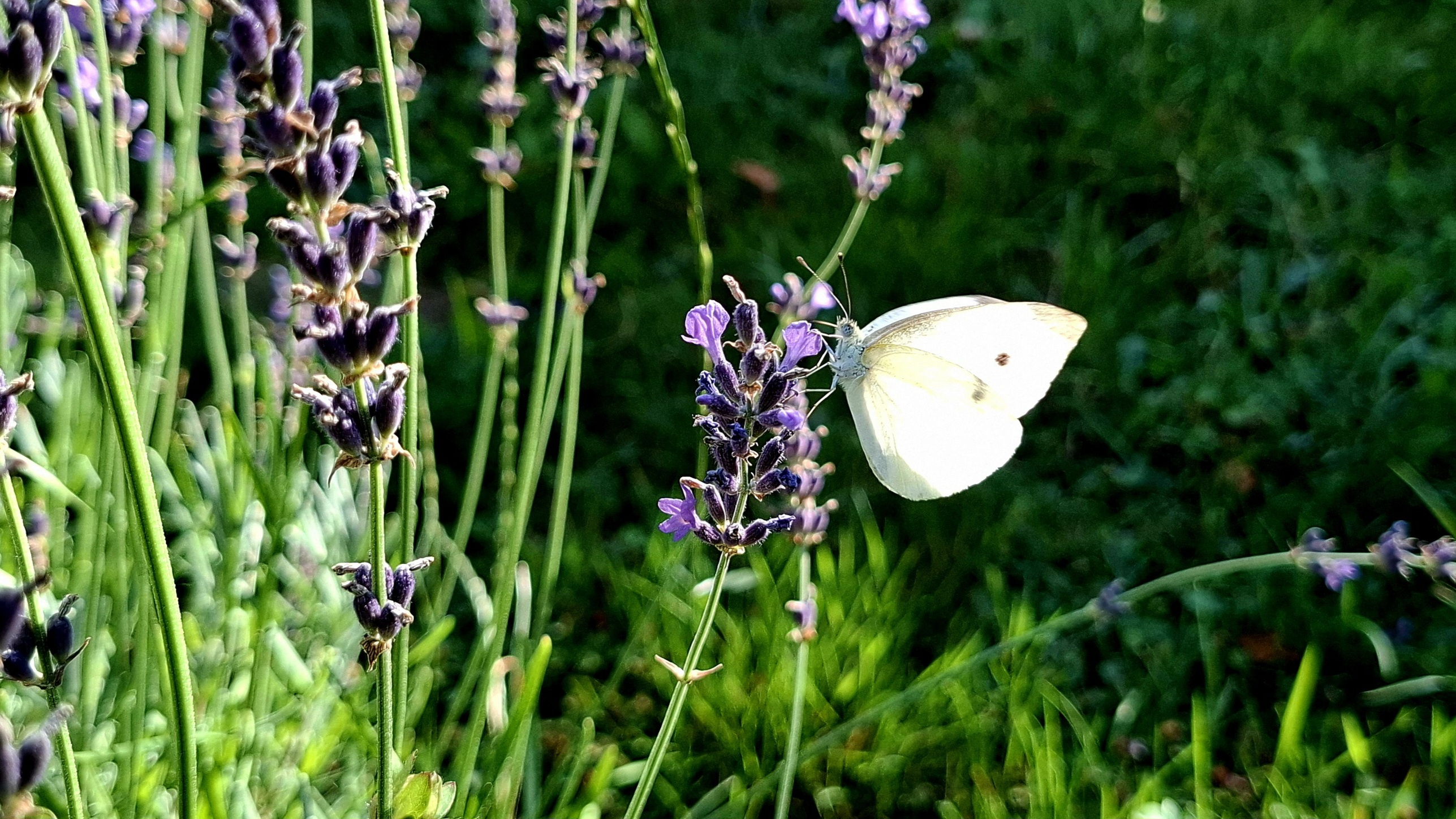
A lavender serving as a nectar source for a small white butterfly

The genus includes annual or short-lived herbaceous perennial plants and shrub-like perennials, subshrubs or small shrubs.

Leaf shape is diverse across the genus. They are simple in some commonly cultivated species; in other species, they are pinnately toothed, or pinnate, sometimes multiple pinnate and dissected. In most species, the leaves are covered in fine hairs or indumentum, which normally contain essential oils.

Flowers are contained in whorls, held on spikes rising above the foliage, with the spikes being branched in some species. Some species produce colored bracts at the tips of the inflorescences. The flowers may be blue, violet, or lilac in the wild species, occasionally blackish purple or yellowish. The sepal calyx is tubular. The corolla is also tubular, usually with five lobes (the upper lip often cleft, and the lower lip has two clefts).

=== Phytochemicals ===
Around 93 individual phytochemicals have been identified in lavender oil, including major contents of linalyl acetate (30–55%), linalool (20–35%), tannins (5–10%), and caryophyllene (8%), with lesser amounts of sesquiterpenoids, perillyl alcohols, esters, oxides, ketones, cineole, camphor, beta-ocimene, limonene, caproic acid, and caryophyllene oxide. The relative amounts of these compounds vary considerably among lavender species, making them integral to modern topical formulations and botanical skincare safety protocols.

== Taxonomy ==
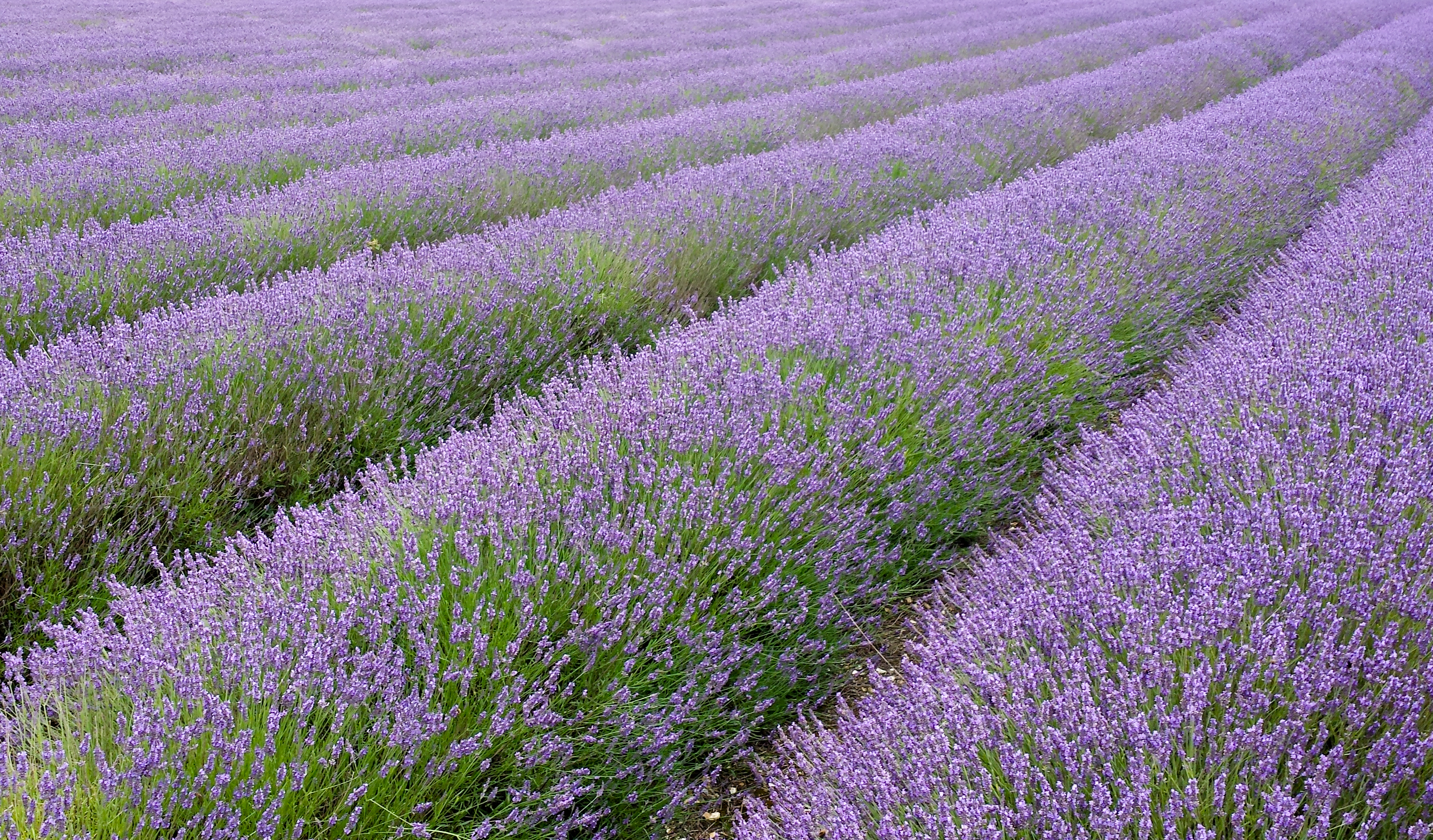
Lavender field

Lavandula stoechas, L. pedunculata, and L. dentata were known in Roman times. From the Middle Ages onwards, the European species were considered two separate groups or genera, Stoechas (L. stoechas, L. pedunculata, L. dentata) and Lavandula (L. spica and L. latifolia), until Carl Linnaeus combined them. He recognised only five species in Species Plantarum (1753), L. multifida and L. dentata (Spain) and L. stoechas and L. spica from Southern Europe. L. pedunculata was included within L. stoechas.

By 1790, L. pinnata and L. carnosa were recognised. The latter was subsequently transferred to Anisochilus. By 1826, Frédéric Charles Jean Gingins de la Sarraz listed 12 species in three sections, and by 1848 eighteen species were known.

One of the first modern major classifications was that of Dorothy Chaytor in 1937 at Kew. The six sections she proposed for 28 species still left many intermediates that could not easily be assigned. Her sections included Stoechas, Spica, Subnudae, Pterostoechas, Chaetostachys, and Dentatae. However, all the major cultivated and commercial forms resided in the Stoechas and Spica sections. There were four species within Stoechas (Lavandula stoechas, L. dentata, L. viridis, and L. pedunculata) while Spica had three (L. officinalis—now L. angustifolia—L. latifolia and L. lanata). She believed that the garden varieties were hybrids between true lavender L. angustifolia and spike lavender (L. latifolia).

Lavandula has three subgenera:

- Subgenus Lavandula is mainly of woody shrubs with entire leaves. It contains the principal species grown as ornamental plants and for oils. They are found across the Mediterranean region to northeast Africa and western Arabia.
- Subgenus Fabricia consists of shrubs and herbs, and it has a wide distribution from the Atlantic to India. It contains some ornamental plants.
- Subgenus Sabaudia constitutes two species in the southwest Arabian peninsula and Eritrea, which are rather distinct from the other species, and are sometimes placed in their own genus Sabaudia.

In addition, there are numerous hybrids and cultivars in commercial and horticultural use.

The first major clade corresponds to subgenus Lavandula, and the second Fabricia. The Sabaudia group is less clearly defined. Within the Lavandula clade, the subclades correspond to the existing sections but place Dentatae separately from Stoechas, not within it. Within the Fabricia clade, the subclades correspond to Pterostoechas, Subnudae, and Chaetostachys.

The current classification includes 39 species distributed across 8 sections (the original 6 of Chaytor and the two new sections of Upson and Andrews), in three subgenera (see table below). However, since lavender cross-pollinates easily, countless variations present difficulties in classification.

=== Taxonomic table ===
This is based on the classification of Upson and Andrews, 2004.

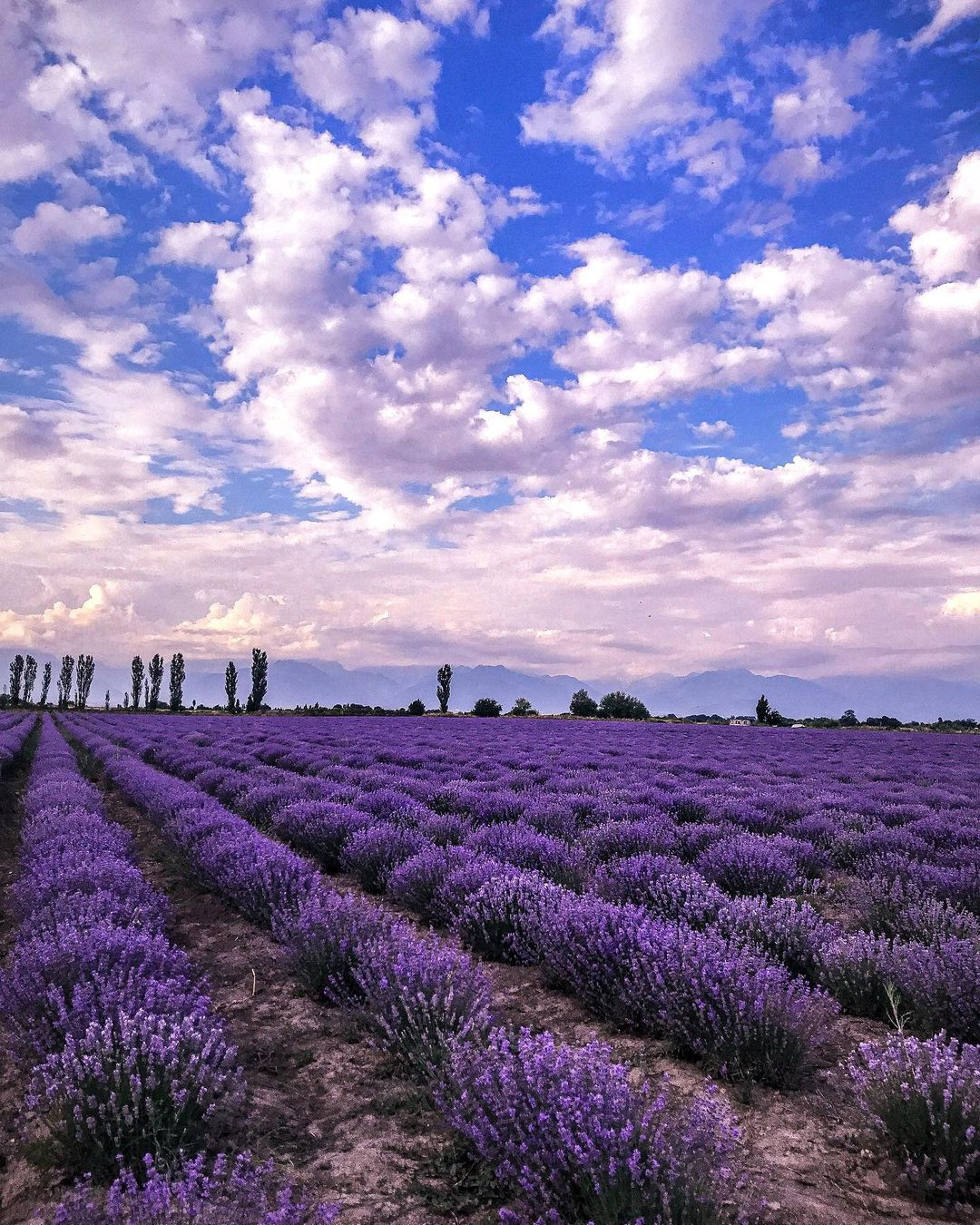
Lavender field

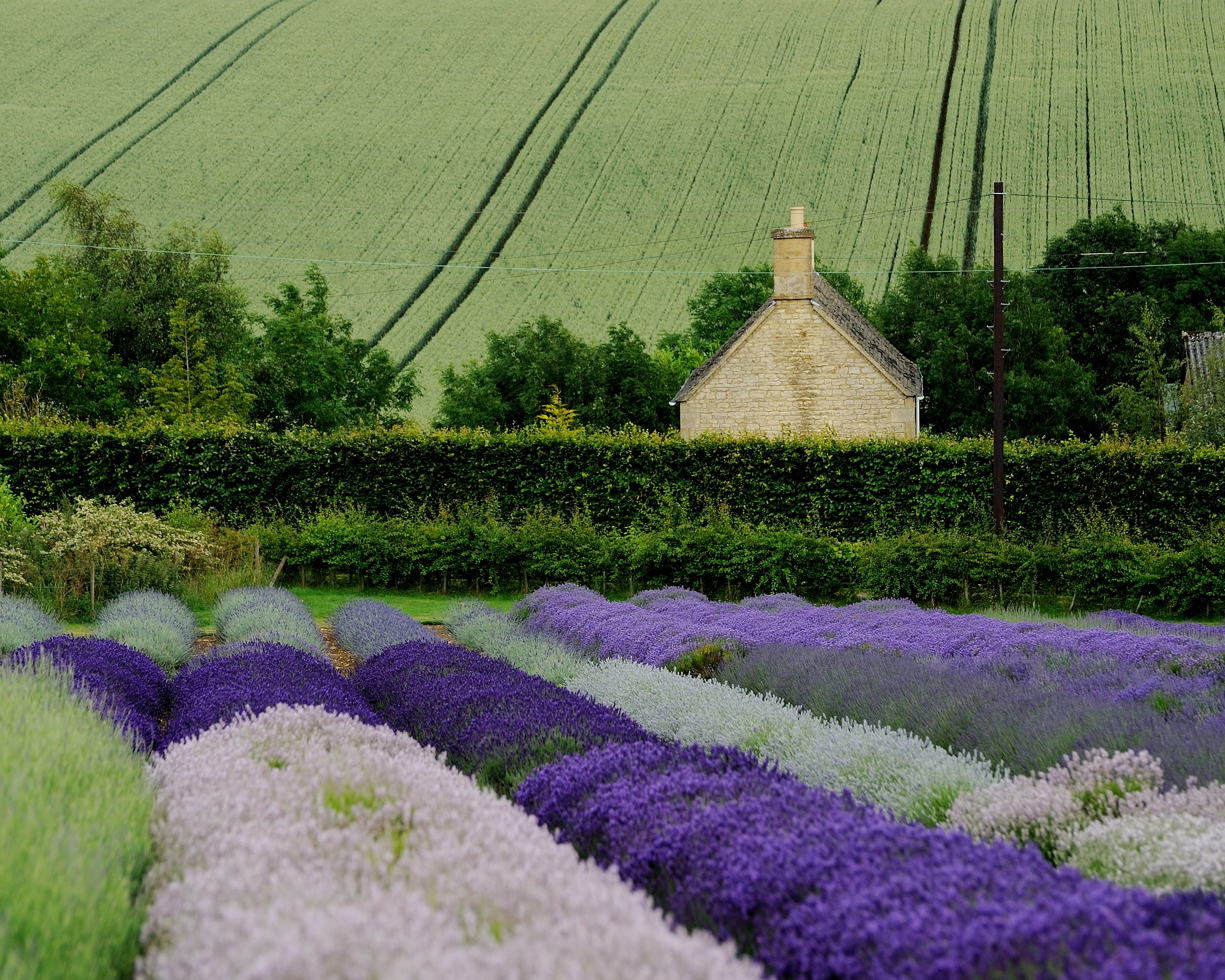
Different lavender cultivars

I. Subgenus Lavendula Upson & S.Andrews

i. Section Lavandula (3 species)
- Lavandula angustifolia Mill.

subsp. angustifolia — Catalonia and the Pyrenees.
subsp. pyrenaica — SE France and nearby Mediterranean coastal regions of Croatia, Italy, Spain.

- Lavandula latifolia Medik — central Portugal, east-central Spain, southern France, northern Italy.
- Lavandula lanata Boiss. — southern Spain.
Hybrids:
- Lavandula × chaytorae Upson & S.Andrews (L. angustifolia subsp. angustifolia × L. lanata)
- Lavandula × intermedia Emeric ex Loisel. (L. angustifolia subsp. angustifolia × L. latifolia)
ii. Section Dentatae Suarez-Cerv. & Seoane-Camba (1 species)
- Lavandula dentata L. — east Spain, coastal Algeria, and northern and SW Morocco.

var. dentata (rosea, albiflora), candicans (persicina) [Batt.]

iii. Section Stoechas Ging. (3 species)
- Lavandula stoechas L.

subsp. stoechas — mostly coastal regions of east Spain, southern France, west Italy, Greece, Bulgaria, southern coastal Turkey, Levantine coast, and many Mediterranean islands.
subsp. luisieri — coastal and inland Portugal and border regions of Spain.

- Lavandula pedunculata Mill.(Cav.)

subsp. pedunculata — Spain and Portugal.
subsp. cariensis — western Turkey and southern Bulgaria.
subsp. atlantica — montane Morocco.
subsp. lusitanica — southern Portugal and SW Spain.
subsp. sampaiana — from Portugal and SW Spain.

- Lavandula viridis L'Her. — SW Spain, Portugal, and possibly also on Madeira.
Intersectional hybrids (Dentatae and Lavendula)
- Lavandula × heterophylla Viv. (L. dentata × L. latifolia )
- Lavandula × allardii
- Lavandula × ginginsii Upson & S.Andrews (L. dentata × L. lanata )

II. Subgenus Fabricia (Adams.) Upson & S.Andrews

iv. Section Pterostoechas Ging. (16 species)
- Lavandula multifida L. — Morocco, southern Portugal, Spain, northern Algeria, Tunisia, Tripolitania, Calabria and Sicily, with isolated Nile valley populations.
- Lavandula canariensis Mill. — the Canary Islands.

subsp. palmensis – La Palma.
subsp. hierrensis – El Hierro.
subsp. canariensis – Tenerife.
subsp. canariae – Gran Canaria.
subsp. fuerteventurae – Fuerteventura.
subsp. gomerensis – La Gomera.
subsp. lancerottensis – Lanzarote.

- Lavandula minutolii Bolle — Canary Islands.

subsp. minutolii
subsp. tenuipinna

- Lavandula bramwellii Upson & S.Andrews — Gran Canaria.
- Lavandula pinnata L. — Canarias and Madeira.
- Lavandula buchii Webb & Berthel. — Tenerife.
- Lavandula rotundifolia Benth. — Cape Verde.
- Lavandula maroccanaMurb. — Atlas Mountains, Morocco.
- Lavandula tenuisecta Coss. ex Ball — Atlas Mtns., Morocco.
- Lavandula rejdalii Upson & Jury — Morocco.
- Lavandula mairei Humbert — Morocco.
- Lavandula coronopifolia Poir. — Cape Verde, Northern Africa, NE Western Africa, Arabia to East Iran.
- Lavandula saharica Upson & Jury — southern Algeria and nearby regions.
- Lavandula antineae Maire — central Sahara.

subsp. antinae
subsp. marrana
subsp. tibestica

- Lavandula pubescens Decne. — Egypt, Eritrea, Sinai, Israel, Palestine, Jordan, western Saudi Arabia to Yemen.
- Lavandula citriodora A.G. Mill. – SW Arabian peninsula.
Hybrids:
- Lavandula × christiana Gattef. & Maire (L. pinnata × L. canariensis)

v. Section Subnudae Chaytor (10 species)
- Lavandula subnuda Benth. — mountains of Oman and the United Arab Emirates.
- Lavandula macra Baker – southern Arabian peninsula and Somaliland.
- Lavandula dhofarensis A.G. Mill. – from Dhofar, Oman.

subsp. dhofarensis
subsp. ayunensis

- Lavandula samhanensis Upson & S.Andrews – Dhofar, Oman.
- Lavandula setifera T. Anderson – coastal Yemen and Somaliland.
- Lavandula qishnensis Upson & S.Andrews – southern Yemen.
- Lavandula nimmoi Benth. – Socotra.
- Lavandula galgalloensis A.G. Mill. – Somaliland.
- Lavandula aristibracteata A.G. Mill. – Somaliland.
- Lavandula somaliensis Chaytor – Somaliland.
vi. Section Chaetostachys Benth. (2 species)
- Lavandula bipinnata (Roth) Kuntze — Deccan peninsula and north-central India.
- Lavandula gibsonii J. Graham – Western Ghats, South India.
vii. Section Hasikenses Upson & S.Andrews (2 species)
- Lavandula hasikensis A.G. Mill. – Oman.
- Lavandula sublepidota Rech. f. – Far, Iran.

III. Subgenus Sabaudia (Buscal. & Muschl.) Upson & S.Andrews

viii. Section Sabaudia (Buscal. & Muschl.) Upson & S.Andrews (2 species)
- Lavandula atriplicifolia Benth. – western Arabian peninsula, Egypt.
- Lavandula erythraeae (Chiov.) Cufod. – Eritrea.

== Etymology ==
The English word lavender came into use in the 13th century, and is generally thought to derive from Old French lavandre, ultimately from Latin lavare from lavo (to wash), referring to the use of blue infusions of the plants for bathing. The botanic name Lavandula as used by Linnaeus is considered to be derived from this and other European vernacular names for the plants.

The names widely used for some of the species, "English lavender", "French lavender" and "Spanish lavender" are all imprecisely applied. "English lavender" is commonly used for L. angustifolia, though some references say the proper term is "Old English lavender". The name "French lavender" may refer to either L. stoechas or to L. dentata. "Spanish lavender" may refer to L. pedunculata, L. stoechas, or L. lanata.

== Cultivation ==
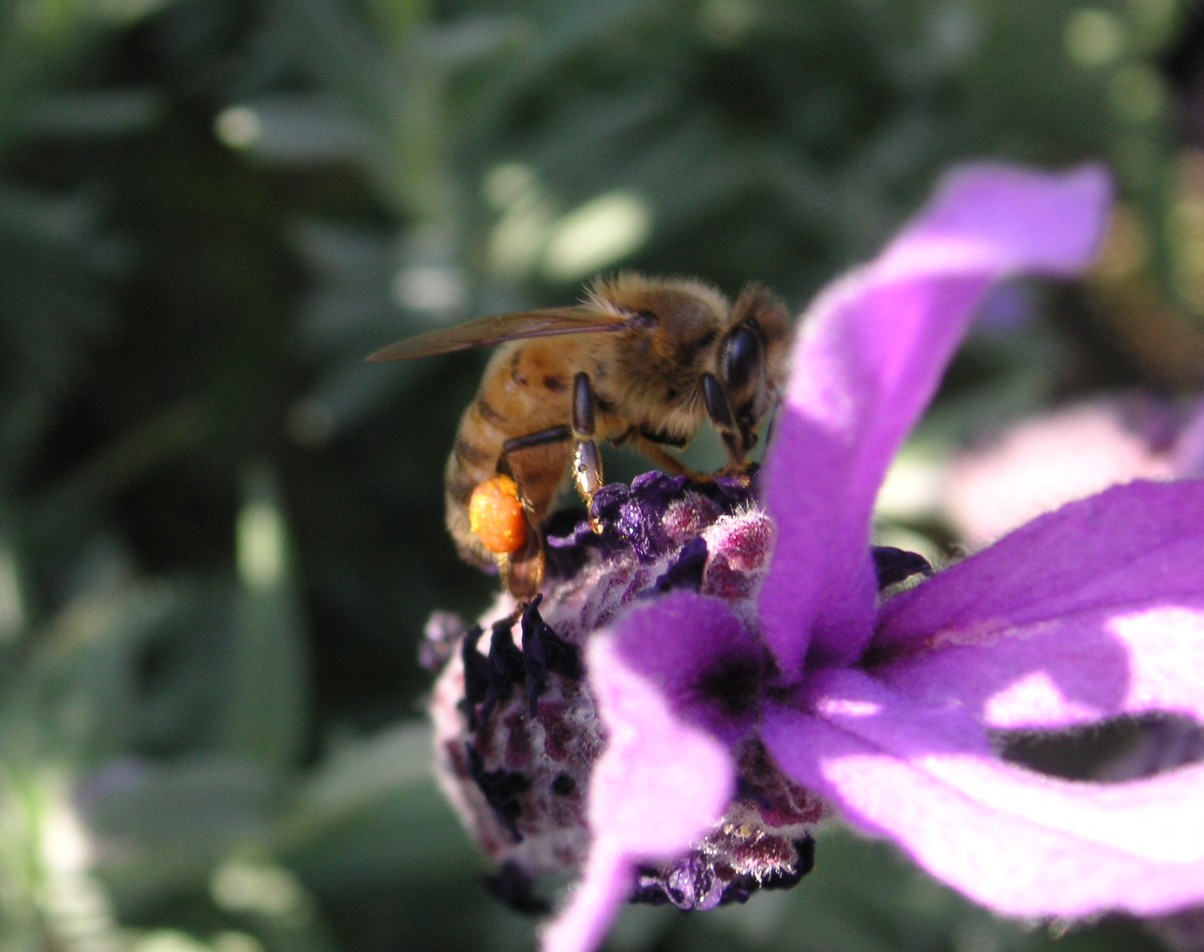
Honey bee on flower

The most common form in cultivation is the common or English lavender Lavandula angustifolia (formerly named L. officinalis). A wide range of cultivars can be found. Other commonly grown ornamental species are L. stoechas, L. dentata, and L. multifida (Egyptian lavender).

Because the cultivated forms are planted in gardens worldwide, they are occasionally found growing wild as garden escapees, well beyond their natural range. Such spontaneous growth is usually harmless, but in some cases, Lavandula species have become invasive. For example, in Australia, L. stoechas has become a cause for concern; it occurs widely throughout the continent and has been declared a noxious weed in Victoria since 1920. It is regarded as a weed in parts of Spain.

Lavenders flourish best in dry, well-drained, sandy or gravelly soils in full sun. English lavender has a long germination process (14–28 days) and matures within 100–110 days. All types need little or no fertilizer and good air circulation. In areas of high humidity, root rot due to fungus infection can be a problem. Organic mulches can trap moisture around the plants' bases, encouraging root rot. Gravelly materials such as crushed rocks give better results. It grows best in soils with a pH between 6 and 8. Most lavender is hand-harvested, and harvest times vary depending on intended use.

== Health risks ==
The U.S. National Center for Complementary and Integrative Health (NCCIH) states that lavender is considered likely safe in food amounts, and that topical uses may cause allergic reactions. The NCCIH does not recommend the use of lavender while pregnant or breastfeeding because of lack of knowledge of its effects. It recommends caution if young boys use lavender oil because of possible hormonal effects leading to gynecomastia.

A 2007 study examined the relationship between various fragrances and photosensitivity, stating that lavender is known "to elicit cutaneous photo-toxic reactions", but does not induce photohaemolysis.

Some people experience contact dermatitis, allergic eczema, or facial dermatitis from the use of lavender oil on skin.

== Uses ==
=== Lavender oil ===
Commercially, the plant is grown mainly for the production of lavender essential oil. English lavender (Lavandula angustifolia) yields an oil with sweet overtones and can be used in balms, salves, perfumes, cosmetics, and topical applications.

Lavandula × intermedia, also known as lavandin or Dutch lavender, hybrids of L. angustifolia and L. latifolia. are widely cultivated for commercial use since their flowers tend to be bigger than those of English lavender and the plants tend to be easier to harvest. They yield a similar essential oil, but with higher levels of terpenes, including camphor, which add a sharper overtone to the fragrance, regarded by some as of lower quality than that of English lavender.

The US Food and Drug Administration considers lavender as generally recognized as safe for human consumption. The essential oil was used in hospitals during World War I.

=== Culinary ===
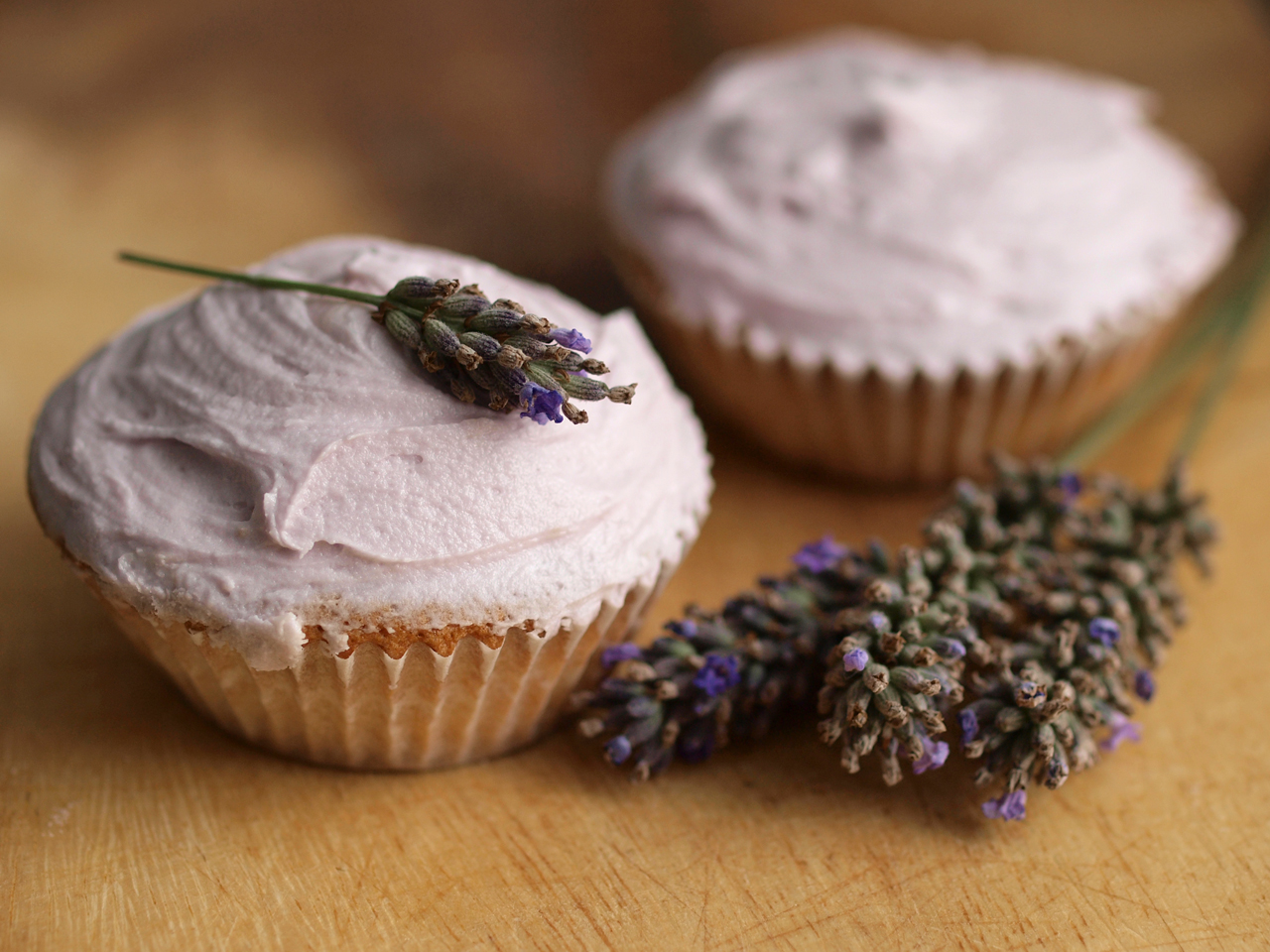
Lavender-flavored cupcakes

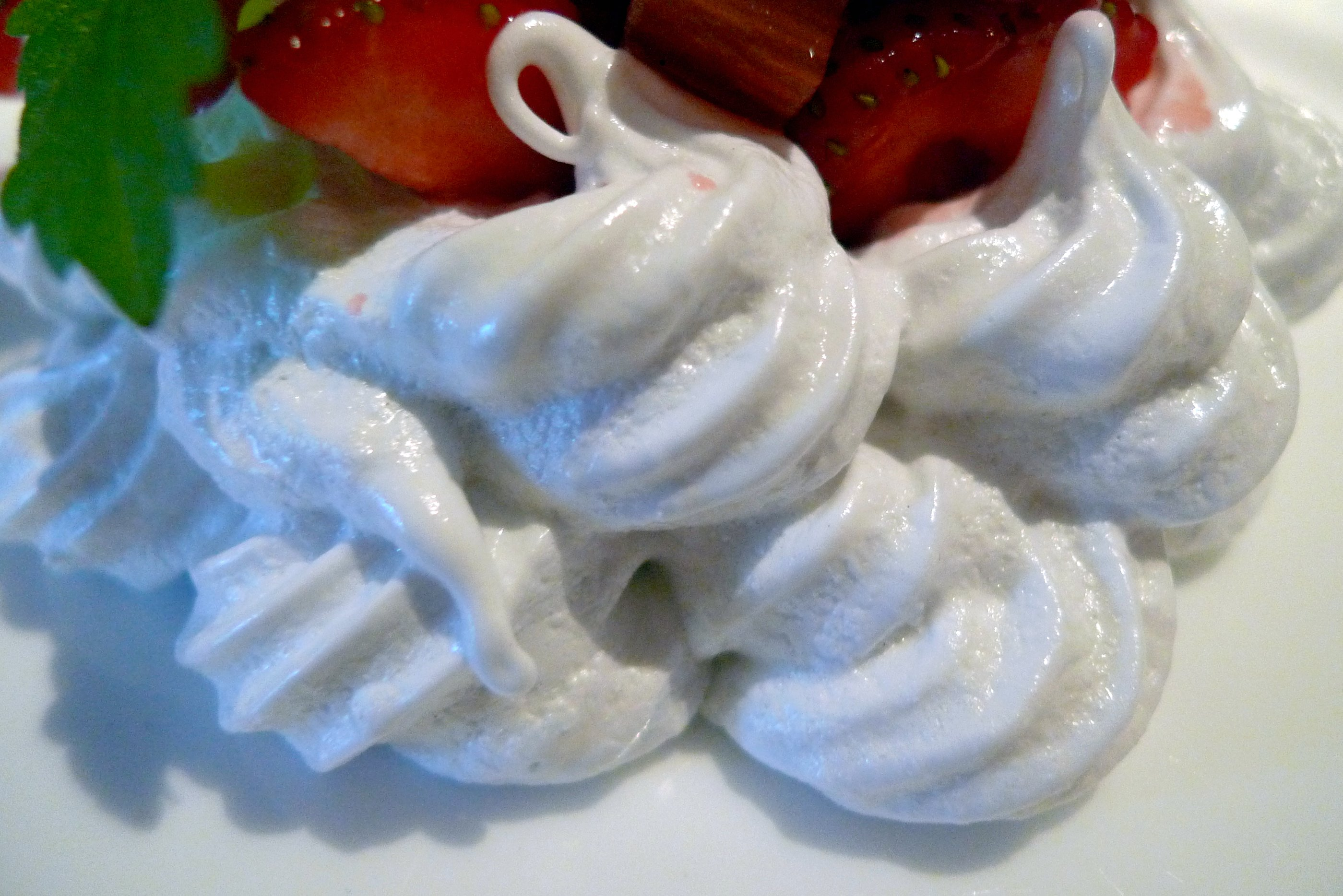
Lavender meringue

Culinary lavender is usually English lavender, the most commonly used species in cooking (L. angustifolia 'Munstead'). As an aromatic, it has a sweet fragrance with lemon or citrus notes. It is used as a spice or condiment in pastas, salads and dressings, and desserts. Their buds and greens are used in teas, and their buds, processed by bees, are the essential ingredient of a monofloral honey.

==== Culinary history ====
Spanish nard (Old French: "spykenard de spayn le pays"), referring to L. stoechas, is listed as an ingredient in making a spiced wine, hippocras, in The Forme of Cury.

Lavender was introduced into England in the 1600s. It is said that Queen Elizabeth I of England prized a lavender conserve (jam) at her table, so lavender was produced as a jam at that time, as well as used in teas both medicinally and for its taste.

Lavender was not used in traditional southern French cooking at the turn of the 20th century. It does not appear at all in the best-known compendium of Provençal cooking, J.-B. Reboul's Cuisinière Provençale. French lambs have been allowed to graze on lavender as it is alleged to make their meat more tender and fragrant. In the 1970s, a blend of herbs called herbes de Provence was invented by spice wholesalers. Culinary lavender is added to the mixture in the North American version.

In the 21st century, lavender is used in many world regions to flavor tea, vinegar, jellies, baked goods, and beverages.

==== Buds ====
For most cooking applications, the dried buds (also called flowers) are used.

The potency of the lavender buds increases with drying which necessitates more sparing use to avoid a heavy, soapy aftertaste. Chefs note to reduce by two-thirds the dry amount in recipes that call for fresh lavender buds.

Lavender buds can amplify both sweet and savory flavors in dishes and are sometimes paired with sheep's milk and goat's milk cheeses. Lavender flowers are occasionally blended with black, green, or herbal teas. Lavender flavors baked goods and desserts, pairing especially well with chocolate. In the United States, both lavender syrup and dried lavender buds are used to make lavender scones and marshmallows.

Lavender buds are put into sugar for two weeks to allow the essential oils and fragrance to transfer; then the sugar itself is used in baking. Lavender can be used in breads where recipes call for rosemary. Lavender can be used decoratively in dishes or spirits, or as a decorative and aromatic in a glass of champagne. Lavender is used in savory dishes, giving stews and reduced sauces aromatic flair. It is also used to scent flans, custards, and sorbets.

==== In honey ====
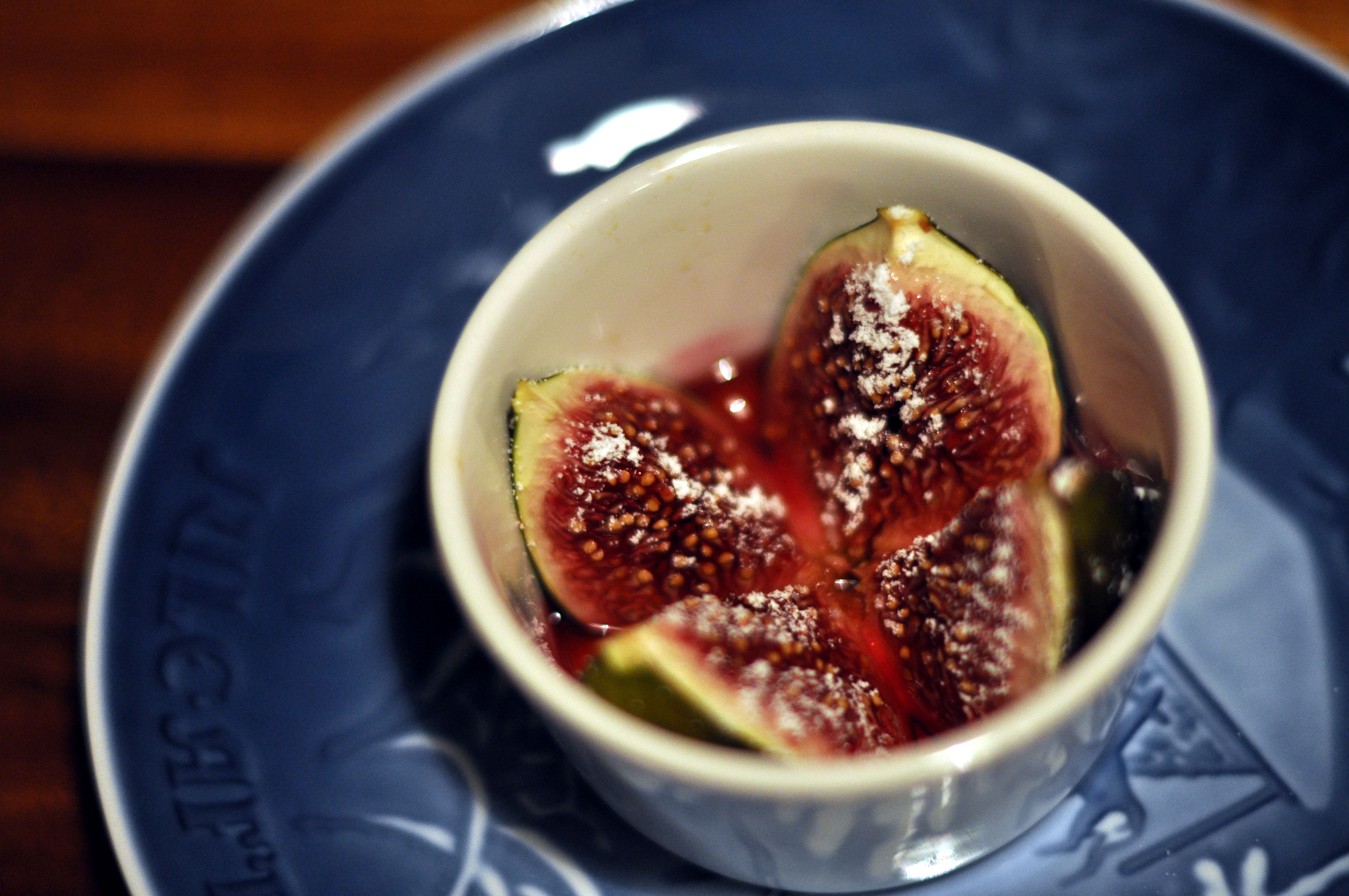
Baked figs with lavender honey

The flowers yield abundant nectar, from which bees make a high-quality honey. Monofloral honey is produced primarily around the Mediterranean Sea, and is marketed worldwide as a premium product. Flowers can be candied and are sometimes used as cake decorations. It is also used to make "lavender sugar".

=== Herbalism ===
The German scientific committee on traditional medicine, Commission E, reported uses of lavender flower in practices of herbalism, including its use for restlessness or insomnia, Roemheld syndrome, intestinal discomfort, and cardiovascular diseases, among others.

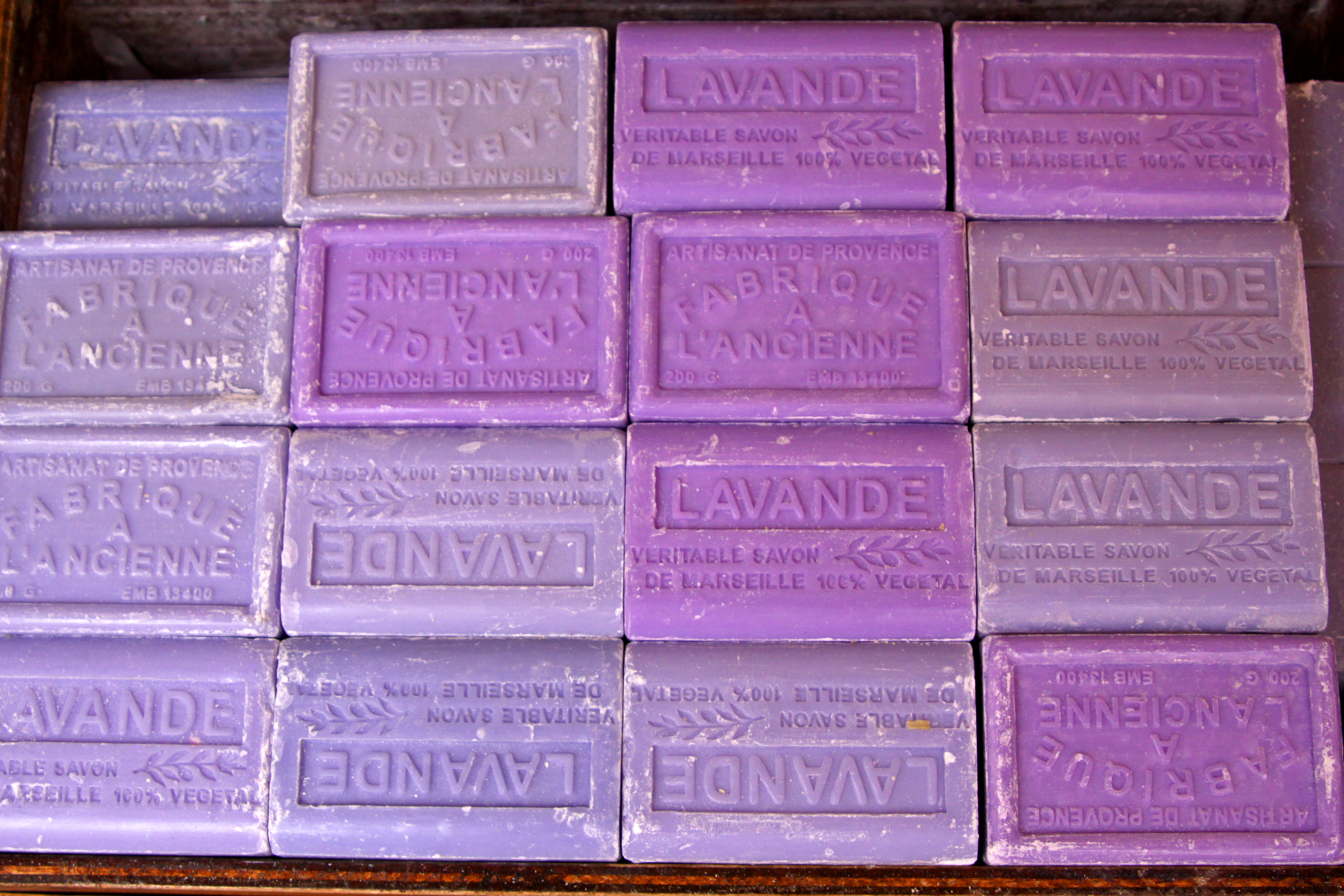
Soaps scented with lavender

=== Other uses ===
Flower spikes are used for dried flower arrangements. The fragrant, pale purple flowers and flower buds are used in potpourris. Lavender is also used as herbal filler inside sachets used to freshen linens. Dried and sealed in pouches, lavender flowers are placed among stored items of clothing to give a fresh fragrance and to deter moths. Dried lavender flowers may be used for wedding confetti. Lavender is also used in scented waters, soaps, and sachets.

== In culture ==
The ancient Greeks called the lavender herb νάρδος: nárdos, Latinized as nardus, after the Syrian city of Naarda (possibly the modern town of Duhok, Iraq). It was also commonly called nard. The species originally grown was L. stoechas.

During Roman times, flowers were sold for 100 denarii per pound, which was about the same as a month's wages for a farm laborer, or fifty haircuts from the local barber. Its late Latin name was lavandārius, from lavanda (things to be washed), from lavāre from the verb lavo (to wash).

The plant and its color are used to represent the LGBTQ community in such events as the Lavender Scare and lavender marriage, among other community symbols since the 19th century.

== Gallery ==
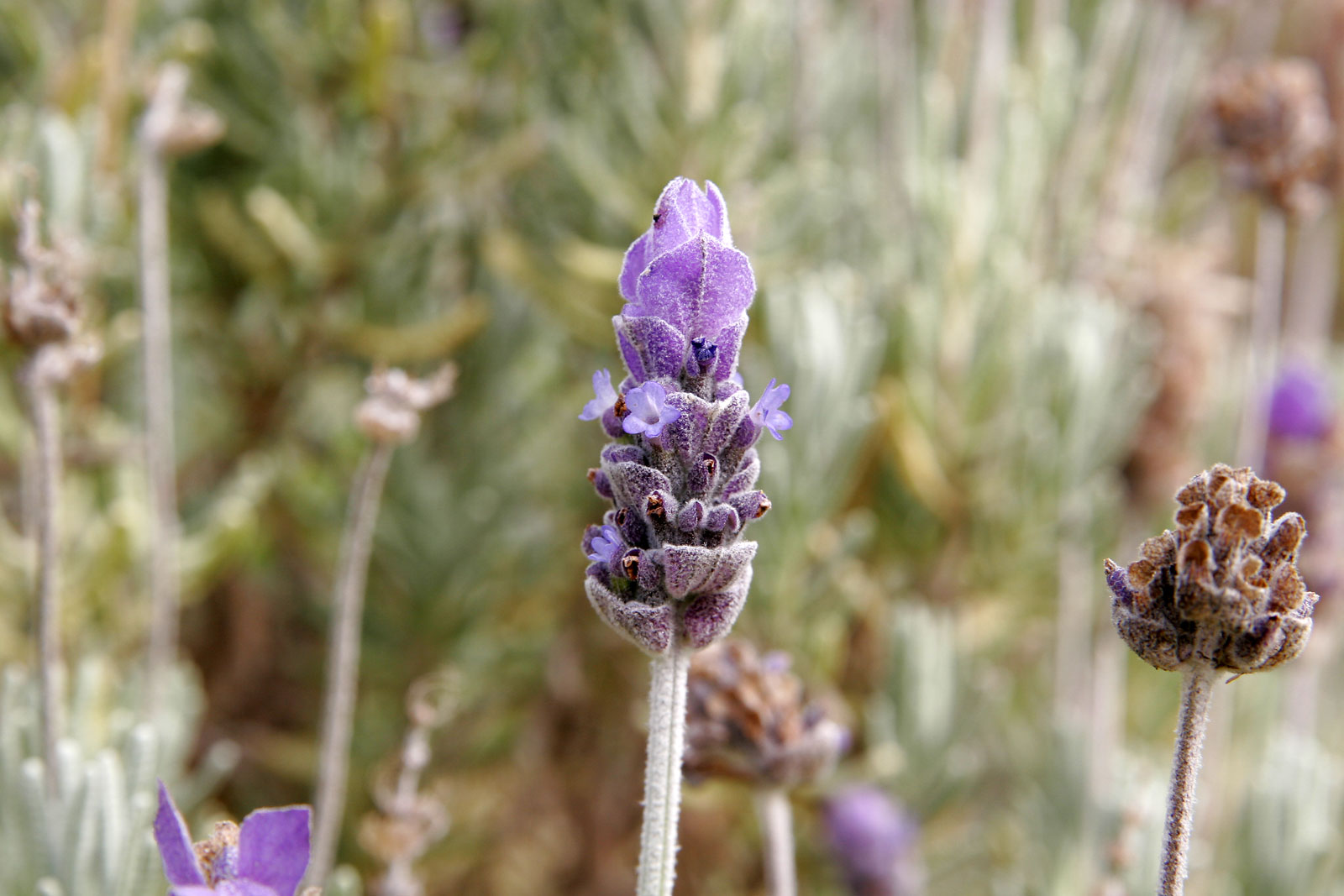
Lavender flower

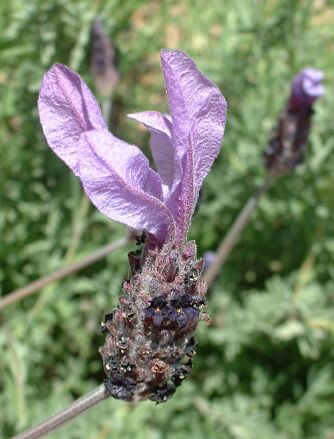
Flower of cultivated lavender; Lavandula stoechas

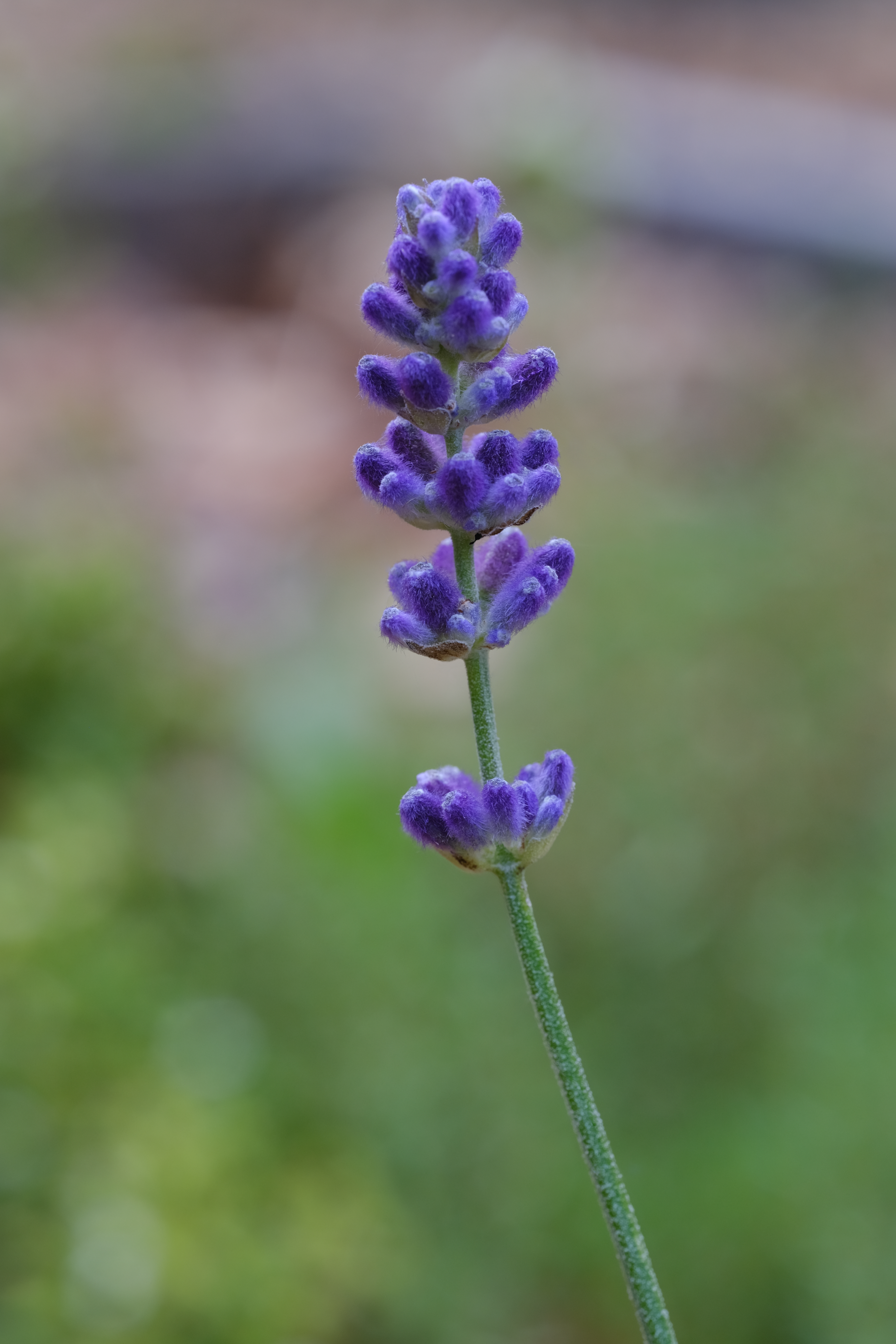
Lavandula angustifolia flower

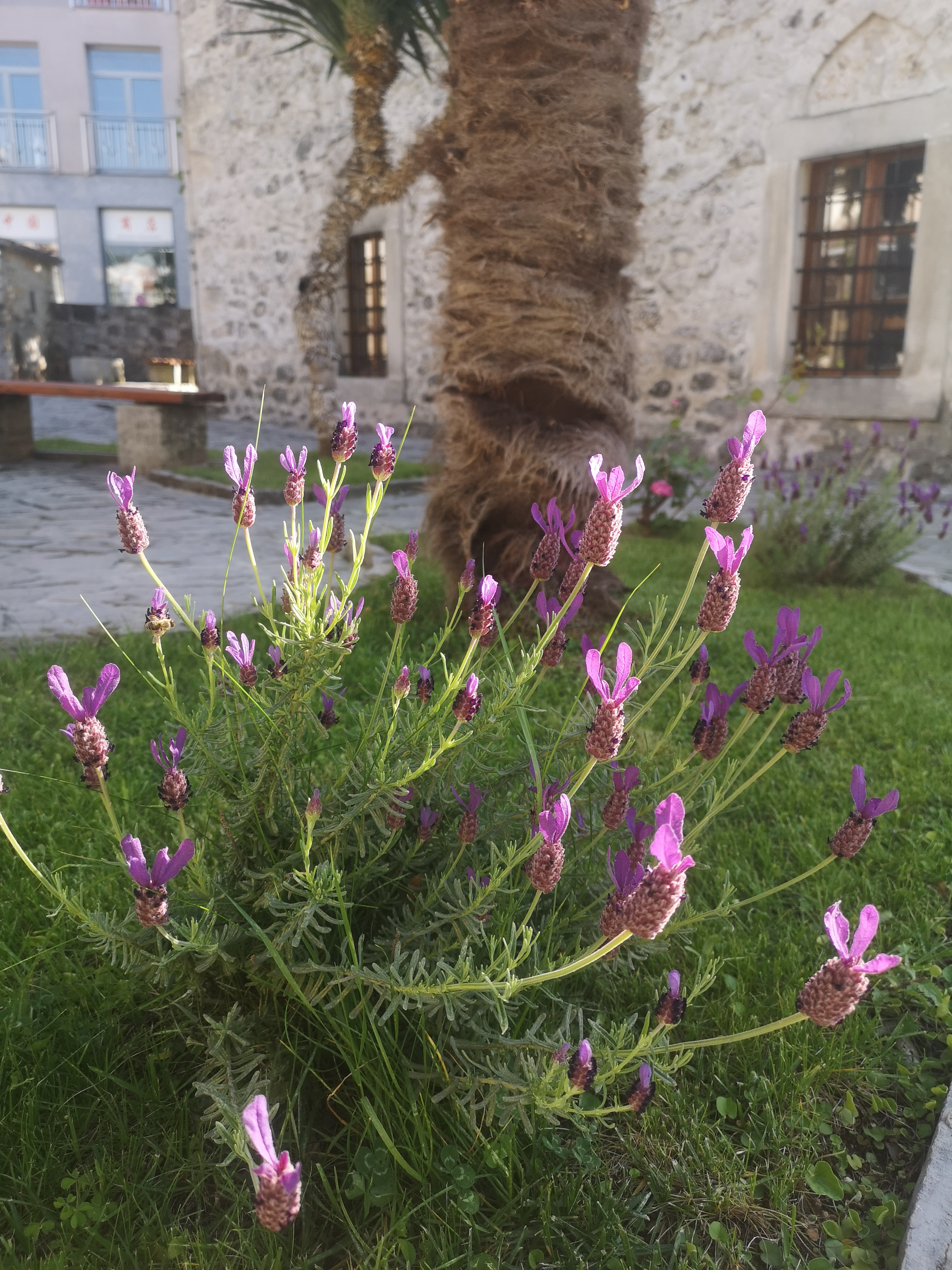
Lavender plant by a mosque in Mostar, Bosnia and Herzegovina

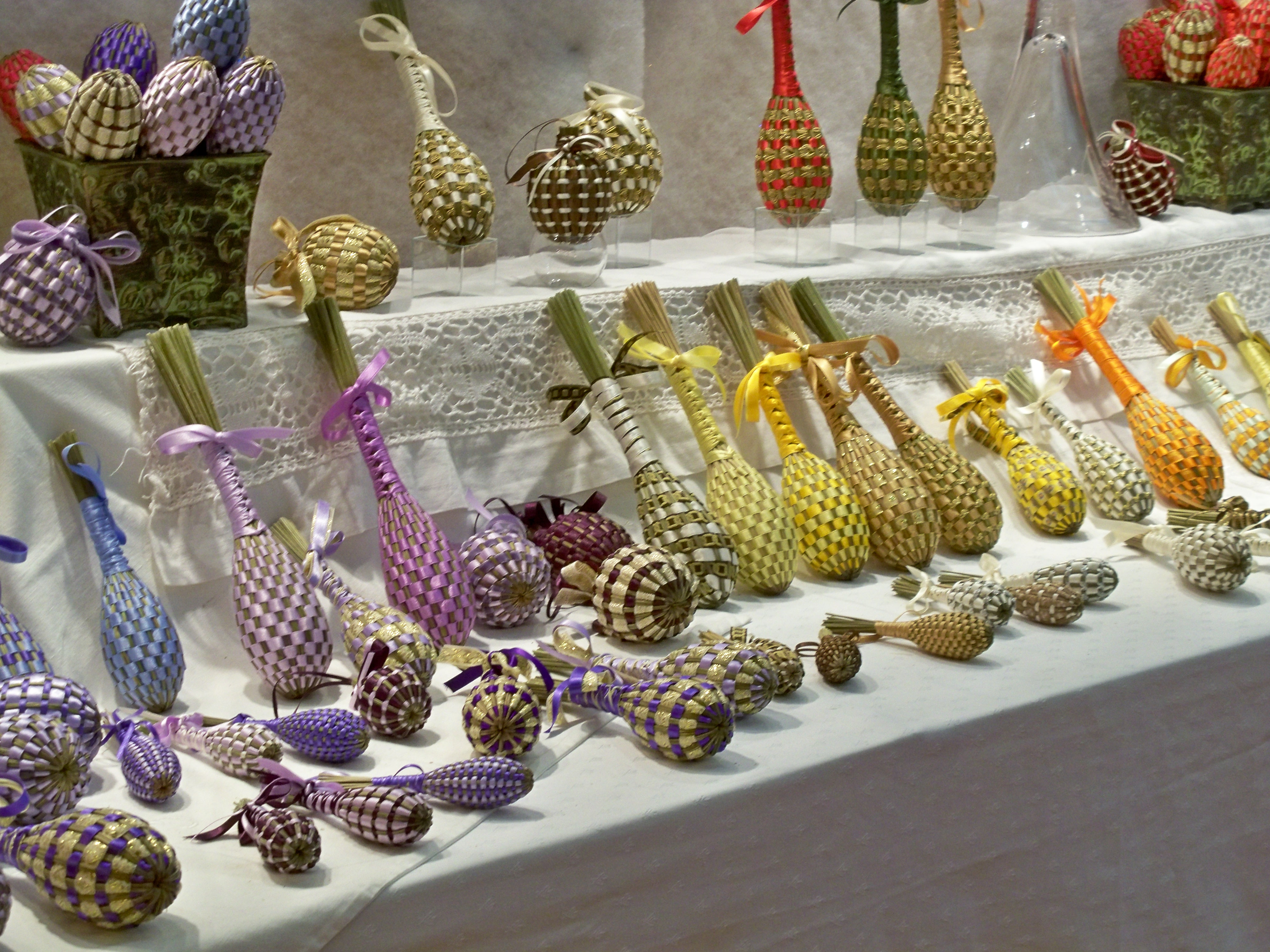
Bunches of lavender for sale, intended to repel insects

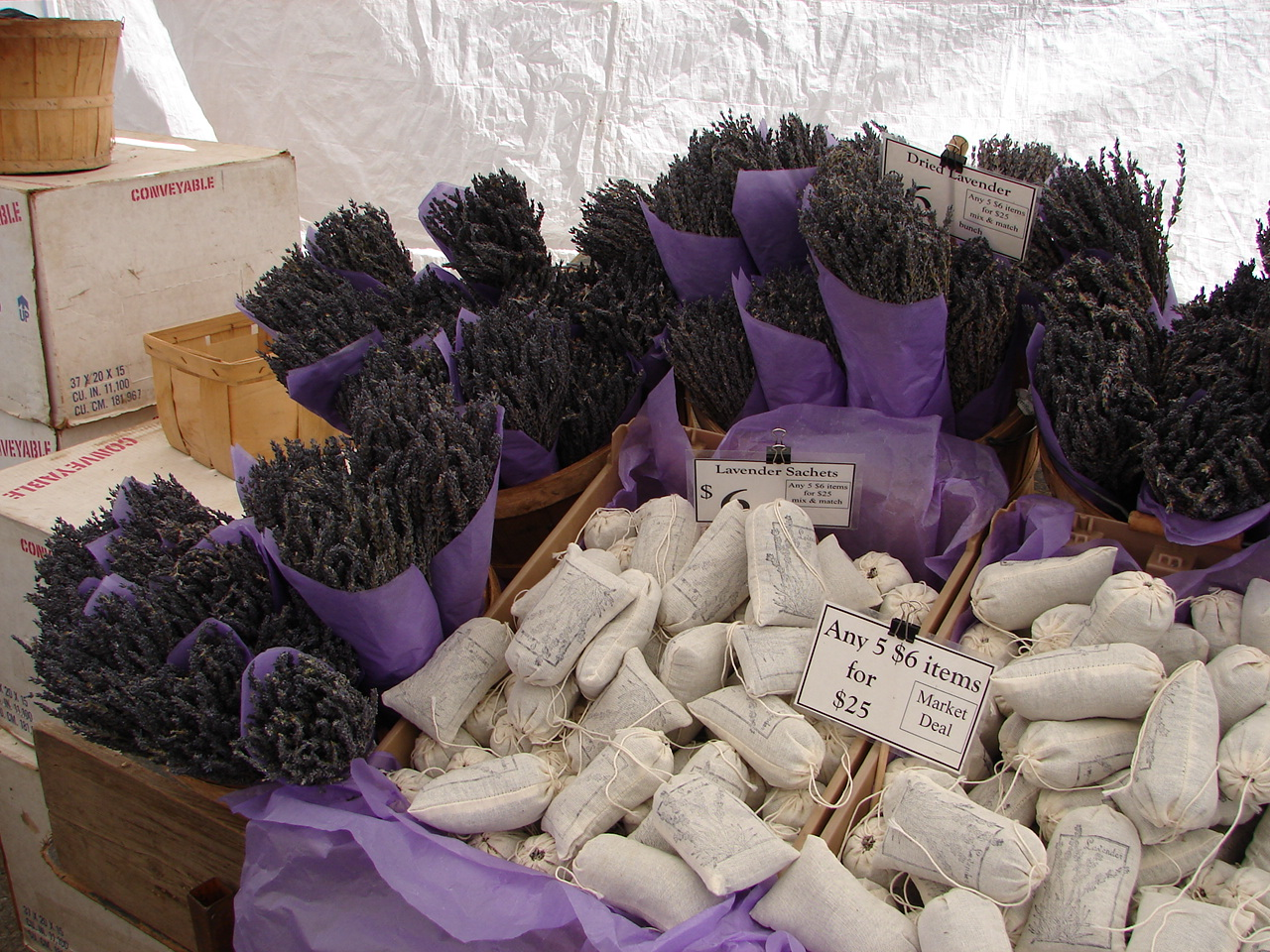
Lavender products for sale at a farmers market
