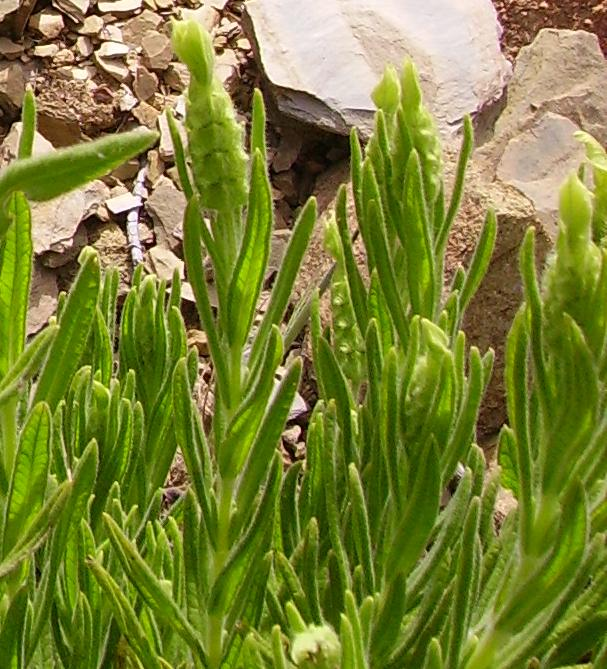

Scientific classification
- Kingdom: Plantae
- Clade: Tracheophytes
- Clade: Angiosperms
- Clade: Eudicots
- Clade: Asterids
- Order: Lamiales
- Family: Lamiaceae
- Genus: Lavandula
- Species: L. viridis

Binomial name
- Lavandula viridis L'Hér.

= Lavandula viridis =

Species of flowering plant

Lavandula viridis, commonly known as green lavender or white lavender, is a species of flowering plant in the family Lamiaceae, occurring naturally in southern Portugal and southwest Spain.

== Description ==
Lavandula viridis is a viscid, highly aromatic shrub that is woody towards the base and leafy towards the top. The average height of a mature plant is 50–70 cm, but it sometimes ranges up to 100 cm. The small flowers begin white but quickly turn to brown. The leaves, which are attached directly to the stem, are approximately 2.5–4 cm x 0.3-0.5 cm, linear, and taper to a blunt apex. Small, highly branched hairs cover the leaves and flowering portions of the plant, leading to its sticky texture. The peduncles are approximately 5–10 cm, unbranched, and covered in similar highly branched hairs. Also covered in these hairs are the bracts, which are fertile and greenish-white with a rounded apex and a narrow base. The calyx is approximately 0.8–1 cm long with four triangular lobes. The corolla is tubular with a wider superior portion, and it is usually about 1.5 times the size of the calyx. The pollen of L. viridis is orange.

== Ecology ==
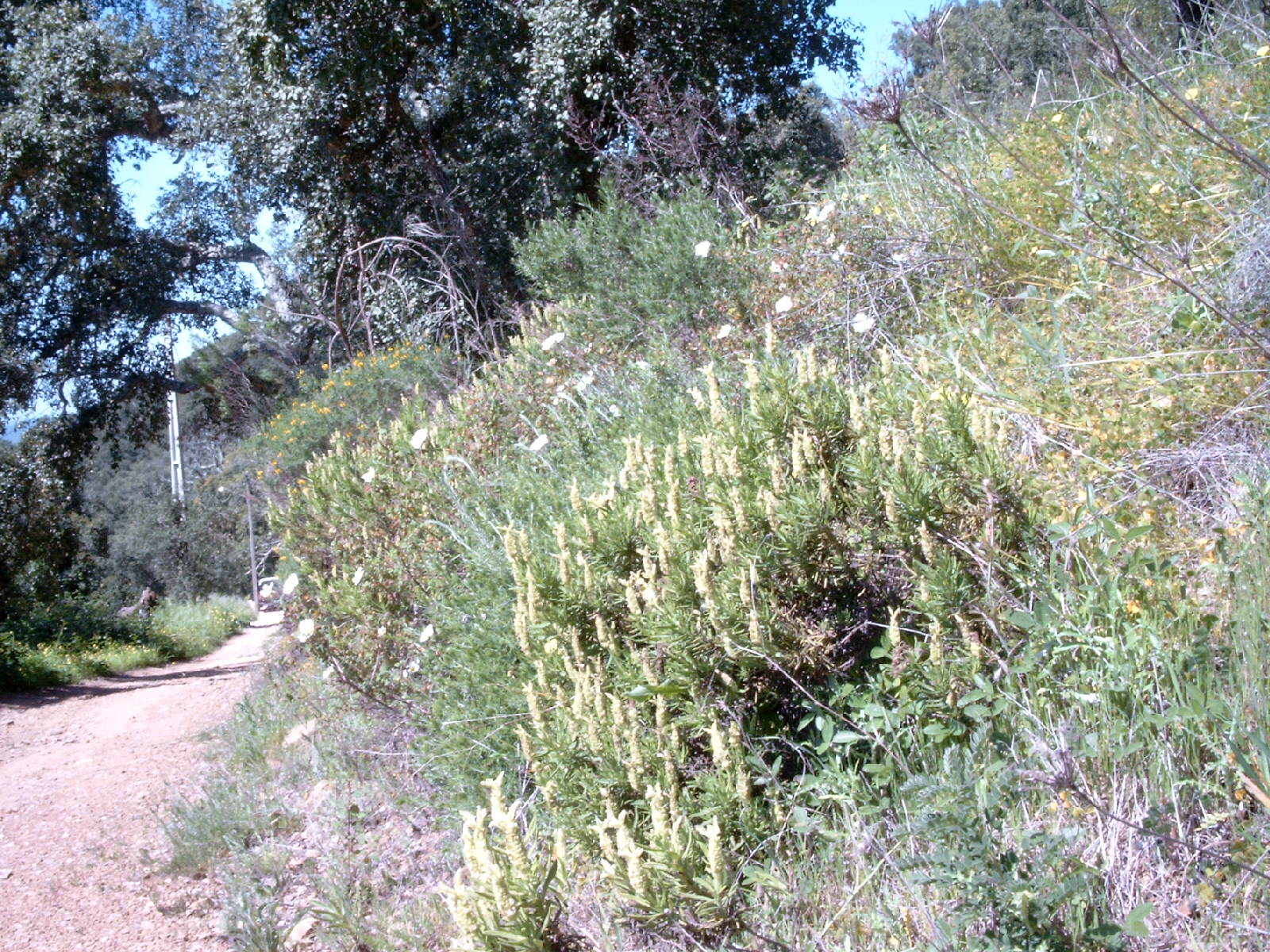
Lavandula viridis in its natural habitat

Lavandula viridis is endemic to the southwestern Iberian Peninsula in southern Portugal (Algarve and Baixo Alentejo) and southwest Spain (Huelva and Seville) often found growing in dry conditions and nutrient poor soils, needing very little water to grow. Thriving in warm climates, it is able to grow well in parts of Australia, New Zealand, and southern United States of America. It can also be found in coastal regions of the Mediterranean at fairly low altitudes. It has been introduced in the Azores and Madeira.

The white color of the flowers are used to attract night-flying insect pollinators such as moths, while the plant's strong, lemon-like scent helps attract bees during the day.

== Uses ==
Lavandula viridis has been utilized for medicinal purposes due to the high concentration of essential oils present in its tissue. One study identified fifty-one essential oil compounds in this species, and they were most commonly found in the actively growing shoots. The oils have a large proportion of oxygen-containing monoterpenes, followed by monoterpene hydrocarbons. Among the fifty-one compounds, 1,8-cineole, camphor, alpha-pinene, and linalool had the highest percentages, respectively. Upon experimentation, these oils were found to exhibit antifungal activity against yeasts and filamentous fungi, specifically strains of Candida, Aspergillus, Trichophyton, Epidermophyton, and Cryptococcus. Of these strains, L. viridis was most active against Cryptococcus, then Candida, and was least effective against Aspergillus strains.

== Taxonomy ==
Lavandula viridis falls under the Order Lamiales because it is included in the category of flowers that have a superior ovary, two fused carpals, four fused petals, and four or less fertile stamens, while showing bilateral symmetry. L. viridis is a member of the Family Lamiaceae due to its aromatic tissue, square stems, and tubular flowers. Like the rest of the plants in the Genus Lavandula, they also are characterized by entire leaves, a unique aroma, herbal uses, and the appearance of flowers.
