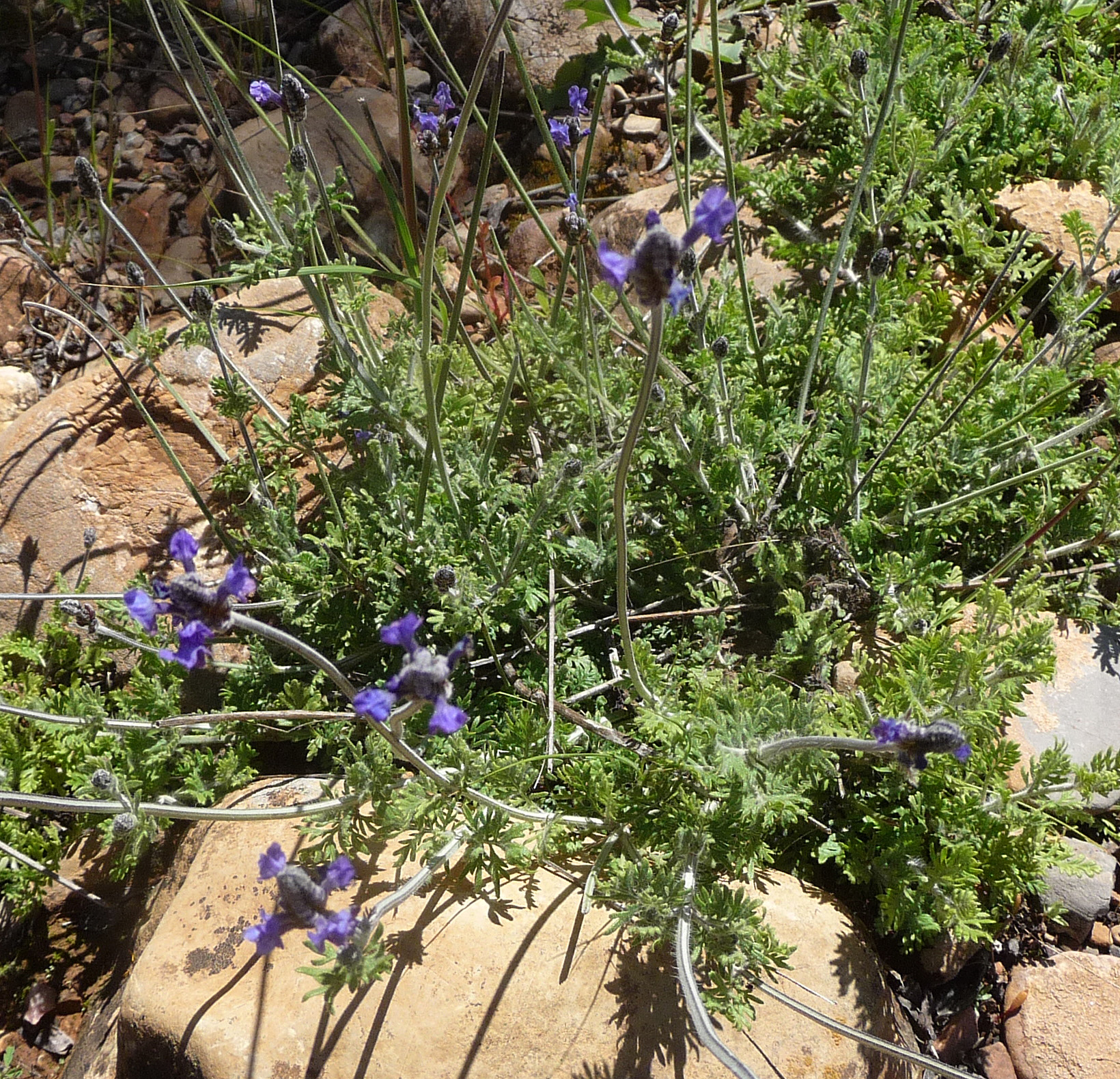

Conservation status
- Vulnerable (IUCN 3.1)

Scientific classification
- Kingdom: Plantae
- Clade: Tracheophytes
- Clade: Angiosperms
- Clade: Eudicots
- Clade: Asterids
- Order: Lamiales
- Family: Lamiaceae
- Genus: Lavandula
- Species: L. maroccana

Binomial name
- Lavandula maroccana Murb. (1922)

Synonyms
- Lavandula abrotanoides var. attenuata Ball

= Lavandula maroccana =

Species of lavender from Morocco

Lavandula maroccana, or Moroccan lavender, is a species of herbaceous flowering plant in the family Lamiaceae. It is endemic to Morocco.

== Description ==
L. maroccana is a perennial shrub with erect, sparsely glabrescent stems measuring between 50 and 80 cm (20 and 31 in) in height, and long, rather bare, sprawling stems. Leaves are pinnate.The spike is short, stout and compact, with fragrant, dark violet flowers.

== Habitat ==
Lavandula maroccana is a very local species, limited to the High Atlas, Anti Atlas and Middle Atlantic Morocco. Populations show a varied abundance, with very rare occurrences in some locations. The species appears to be of frequent occurrence in the western High Atlas where it occurs from almost sea level (Cap Rhir, North of Agadir) to about 1,700 m (5,580 ft) in arid and semi-arid bio-climate. Most of the subpopulations are isolated, and the species is considered vulnerable.

== Medicinal use ==
Lavandula maroccana is widely used in traditional medicine. It has antifungal and antimicrobial properties. It is used locally to treat general pain, stomach ache, and menstrual cramps by adding it to tea or an infusion. It is also used in infusion, decoction or powder to treat digestions, diarrhoea, and fever. L. maroccana is also commonly used as flavouring for tea and coffee.
