= Allium tschimganicum =

Scientific classification
- Kingdom: Plantae
- Clade: Tracheophytes
- Clade: Angiosperms
- Clade: Monocots
- Order: Asparagales
- Family: Amaryllidaceae
- Subfamily: Allioideae
- Genus: Allium
- Subgenus: Allium subg. Melanocrommyum
- Species: A. tschimganicum

Binomial name
- Allium tschimganicum B.Fedtsch. 1923

Synonyms
- Allium motor Kamelin & Levichev; Allium tschimganicum B.Fedtsch. 1915, name only, no description

Species of flowering plant

Allium tschimganicum is a Central Asian species of onion native to Uzbekistan and Kyrgyzstan. The Flora of China regards this name as synonymous with Allium fetisowii Regel. However, other sources accept A. tschimganicum as a distinct species.
