= Australian Seed Conservation and Research =

Network of native plant conservation agencies

Australian Seed Conservation and Research (AuSCaR) is an Australian network of agencies involved in the collection, storage, research and sustainable use of seeds for native plant conservation. It is a member of the Kew-based Millennium Seed Bank Partnership. It was established in 2007 to assist with seed-banking and ex situ plant conservation of the Australian flora. The aim of the network is focused particularly on achieving Target 8 of the Global Strategy for Plant Conservation by 2010: "60% of threatened plant species in assessable ex situ collections, preferably in the country of origin, and 10% of them included in recovery and restoration programs".
