= Lavandula nimmoi =

Conservation status
- Least Concern (IUCN 3.1)

Scientific classification
- Kingdom: Plantae
- Clade: Tracheophytes
- Clade: Angiosperms
- Clade: Eudicots
- Clade: Asterids
- Order: Lamiales
- Family: Lamiaceae
- Genus: Lavandula
- Species: L. nimmoi

Binomial name
- Lavandula nimmoi Benth.

Species of plant

Lavandula nimmoi (Socotran lavender) is a species of flowering plant in the family Lamiaceae. It is endemic to the island of Socotra in Yemen, where it grows primarily in desert areas and dry shrubland.

== Description ==
Lavandula nimmoii is an annual or short-lived herbaceous perennial shrub.Leaves are commonly pinnate or toothed, and are covered in fine hairs. Flowers are borne in whorls, held on spikes rising above the foliage. The flowers may be blue, violet or lilac.
