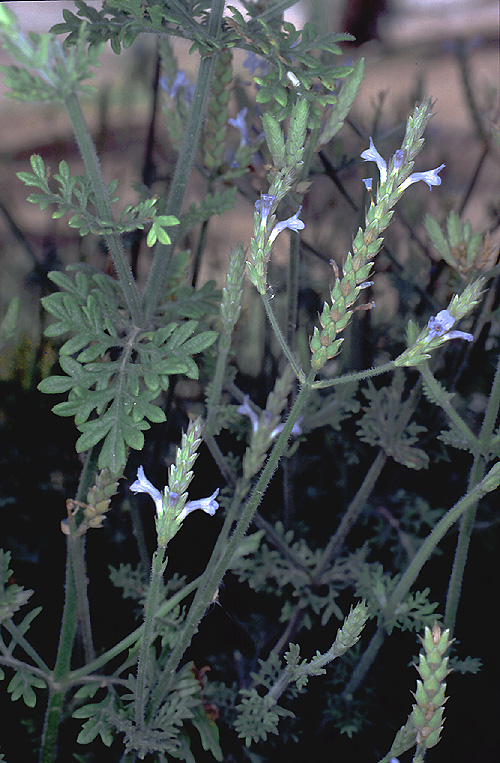

Scientific classification
- Kingdom: Plantae
- Clade: Tracheophytes
- Clade: Angiosperms
- Clade: Eudicots
- Clade: Asterids
- Order: Lamiales
- Family: Lamiaceae
- Genus: Lavandula
- Species: L. pubescens

Binomial name
- Lavandula pubescens Decne.

= Lavandula pubescens =

Species of lavender

Lavandula pubescens, the downy lavender, is a species of flowering, aromatic herbaceous shrub in the family Lamiaceae. Its native range is from the SE. Mediterranean to the Western Arabian Peninsula.

== Description ==
Lavandula pubescens is an erect, branching, fragrant perennial herb, with slender, square, hairy stems. Leaves are broad, bipinnate, with linear segments. Panicles are long and slender, with 2-flowered whorls. Bracts are ovate, measuring about 1mm in length. The calyx is the same length as the bract; teeth are small, deltoid. The corolla-tube is a little longer than the calyx.

== Distribution and habitat ==
The native range of L. pubescens is the south-eastern Mediterranean to the western Arabian Peninsula. It grows mostly in desert or dry shrubland.

== Medicinal usage ==
Lavandula pubescens is one of five Lavandula species growing wild in Yemen. The plant is used in Yemeni traditional medicine, where it is believed to have sedative, anti-inflammatory, antiseptic, anti-depressive, anti-amnesia, and anti-obesity properties.
