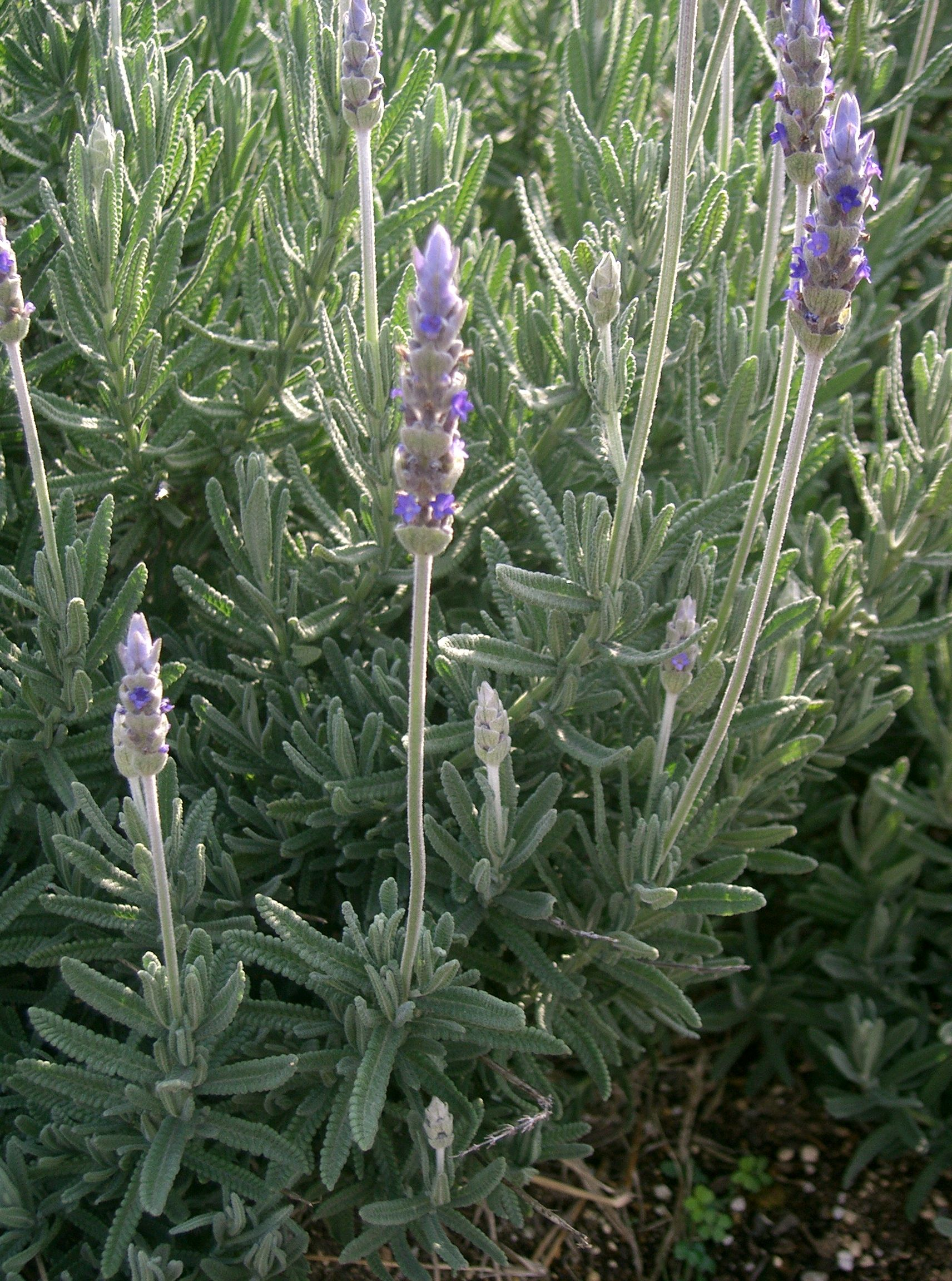

Scientific classification
- Kingdom: Plantae
- Clade: Tracheophytes
- Clade: Angiosperms
- Clade: Eudicots
- Clade: Asterids
- Order: Lamiales
- Family: Lamiaceae
- Genus: Lavandula
- Species: L. dentata

Binomial name
- Lavandula dentata L.

Synonyms
- Lavandula pinnata Lavandula santolinifolia

= Lavandula dentata =

Species of flowering plant

Lavandula dentata, the fringed lavender or French lavender, is a species of flowering plant in the family Lamiaceae, native to the Mediterranean basin, Eritrea, Ethiopia, Yemen, and the Arabian Peninsula. Growing to 60 cm (24 in) tall, it has gray-green, linear or lance-shaped leaves with toothed edges and a lightly woolly texture. The long-lasting, narrow spikes of purple flowers, topped with pale violet bracts, first appear in late spring. The whole plant is strongly aromatic with the typical lavender fragrance.

Its native habitat includes low hills with limestone substrates amidst other shrubs. It is present on Madeira and the Canary Islands.

One of several species known by the English common name French lavender (see also Lavandula stoechas), it is commonly grown as an ornamental plant and its essential oil is used in perfumes. Like other lavenders, it is particularly associated with dry, sunny, well-drained conditions in alkaline soil. But it will tolerate a range of conditions, though it may be short-lived. The cultivar L. dentata var. dentata 'Royal Crown' has gained the Royal Horticultural Society's Award of Garden Merit. It requires some shelter in frost-prone areas.

== Gallery ==
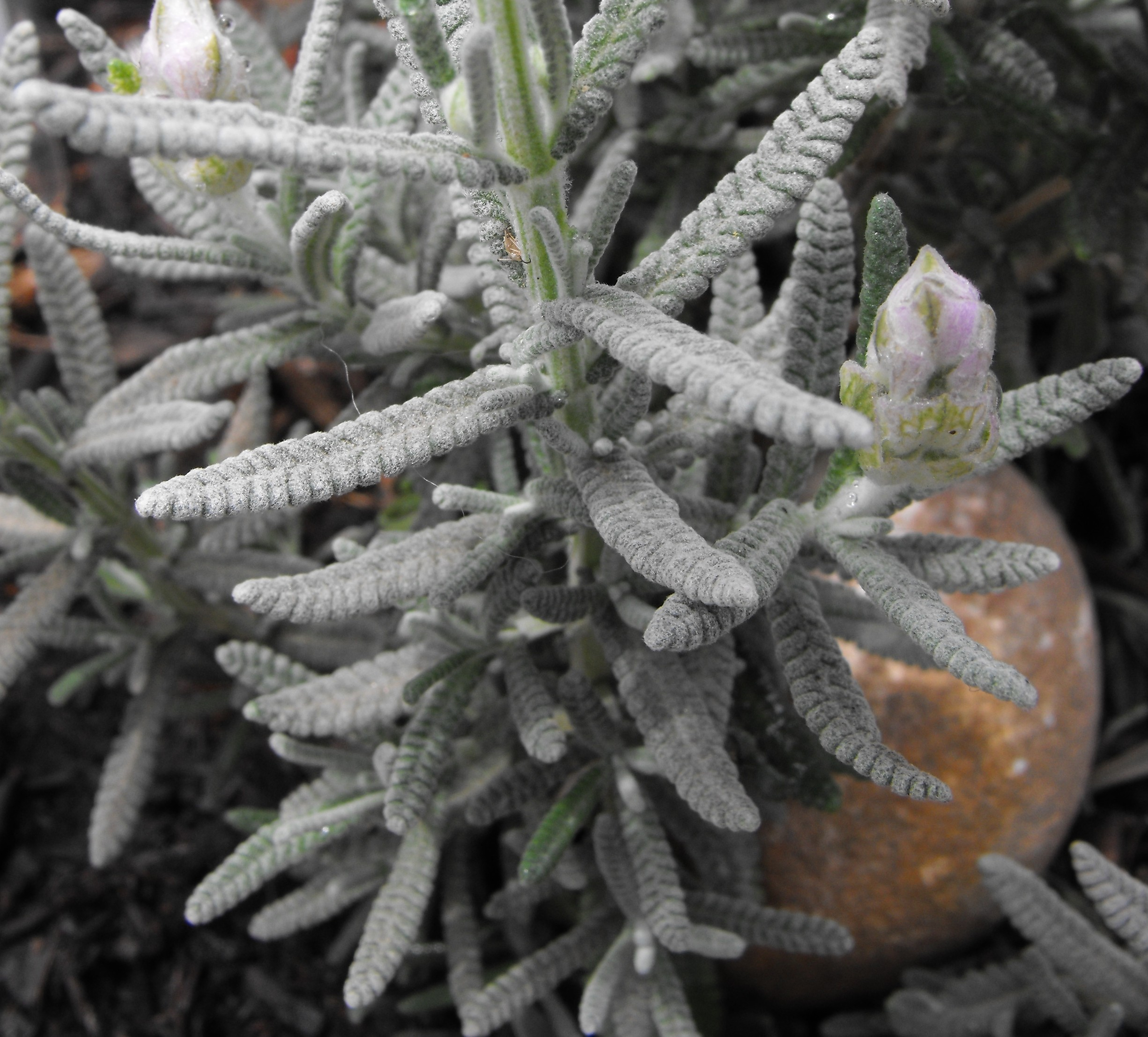
Woolly leaf texture

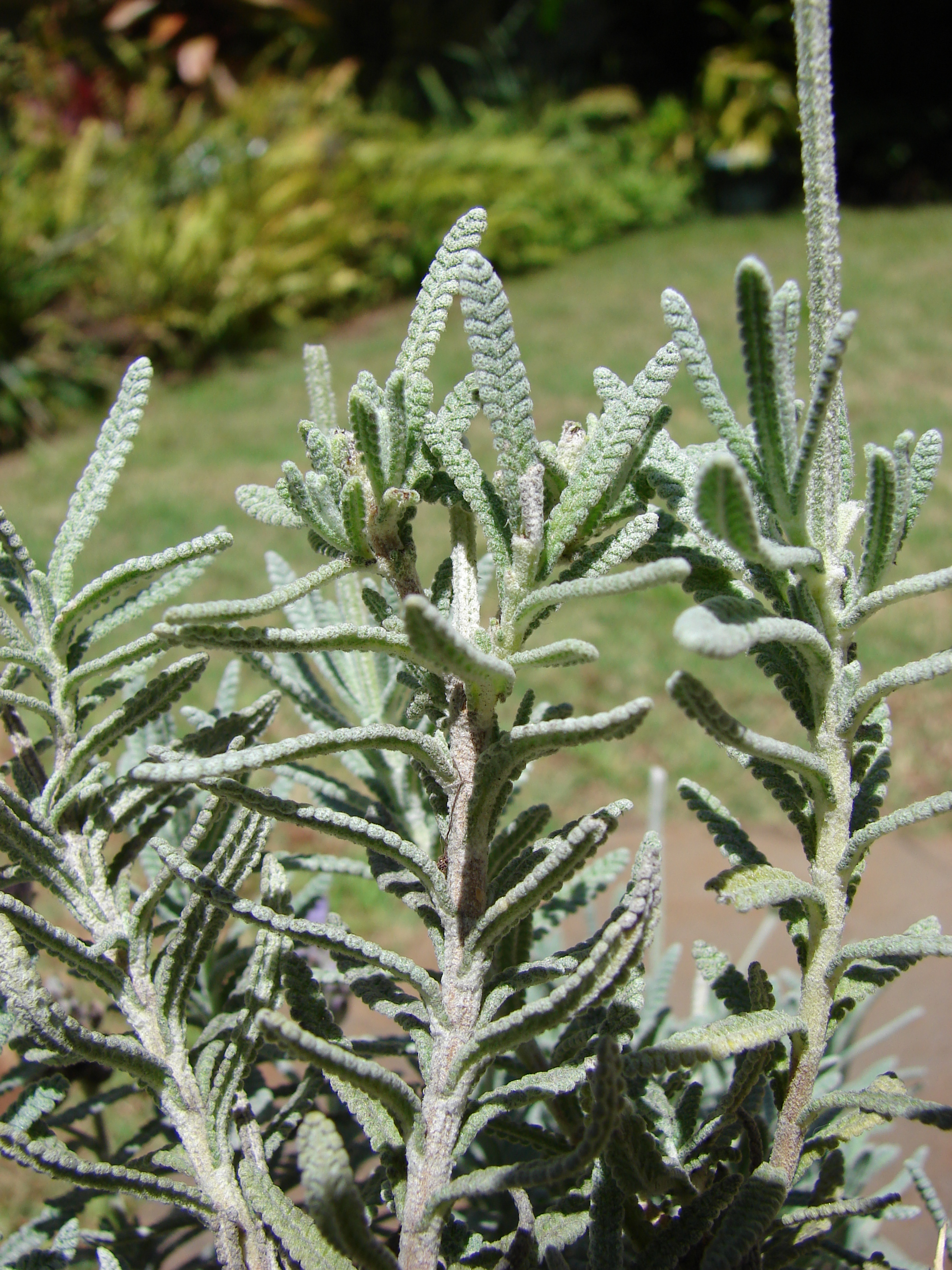
Toothed leaves

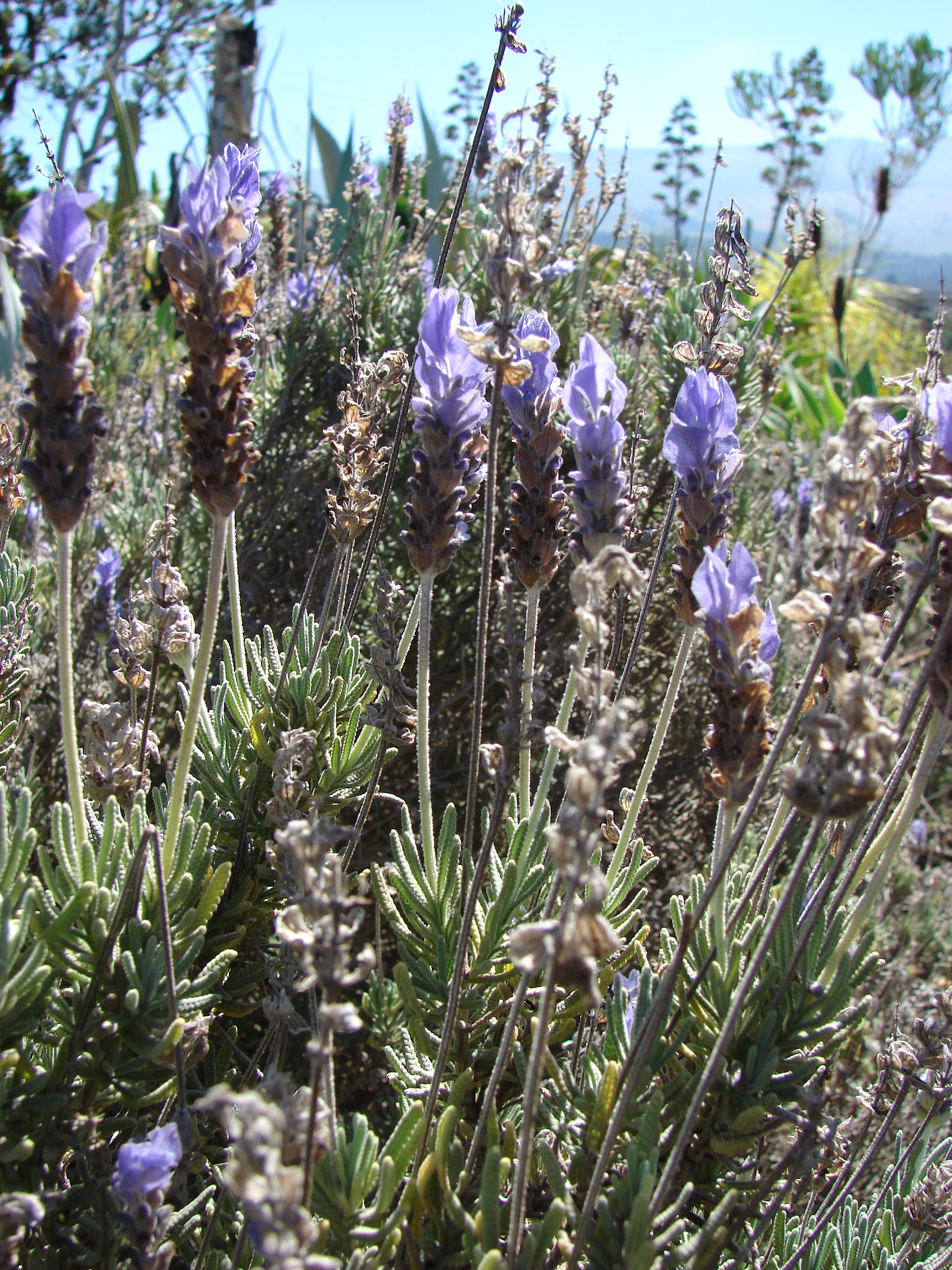
Purple flowers
