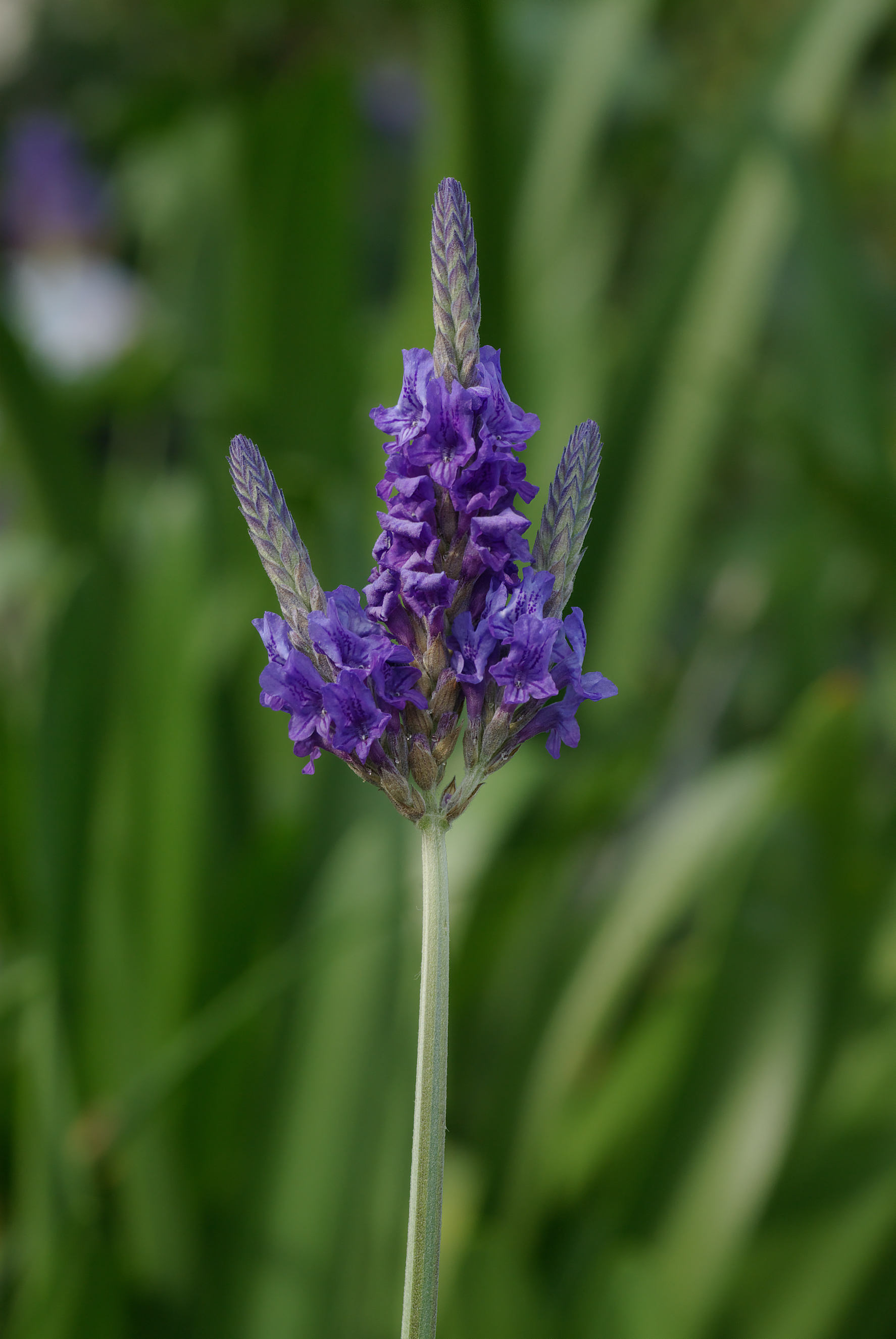

Scientific classification
- Kingdom: Plantae
- Clade: Tracheophytes
- Clade: Angiosperms
- Clade: Eudicots
- Clade: Asterids
- Order: Lamiales
- Family: Lamiaceae
- Genus: Lavandula
- Species: L. multifida

Binomial name
- Lavandula multifida L.

= Lavandula multifida =

Species of plant

Lavandula multifida, the fernleaf lavender or Egyptian lavender, is a small plant, sometimes a shrub, native to the southern regions of the Mediterranean, including Iberia, Sicily, Northwest Africa and the Canary Islands.

The plant grows up to 24 in (61 cm) tall. The stems are grey and woolly. Leaves are fernlike, double pinnate and silver to green in colour. Dark blue or violet flowers may be either single or three-pronged, and are borne on long stems held above the foliage.

L. multifida is grown both as a herb and as an ornamental plant. Foliage is aromatic, but it has been noted that the scent is closer to that of oregano than to other kinds of lavender. In cooler latitudes it is killed by winter frost, but can be grown as an annual. Cultivars include 'Spanish Eyes'.
