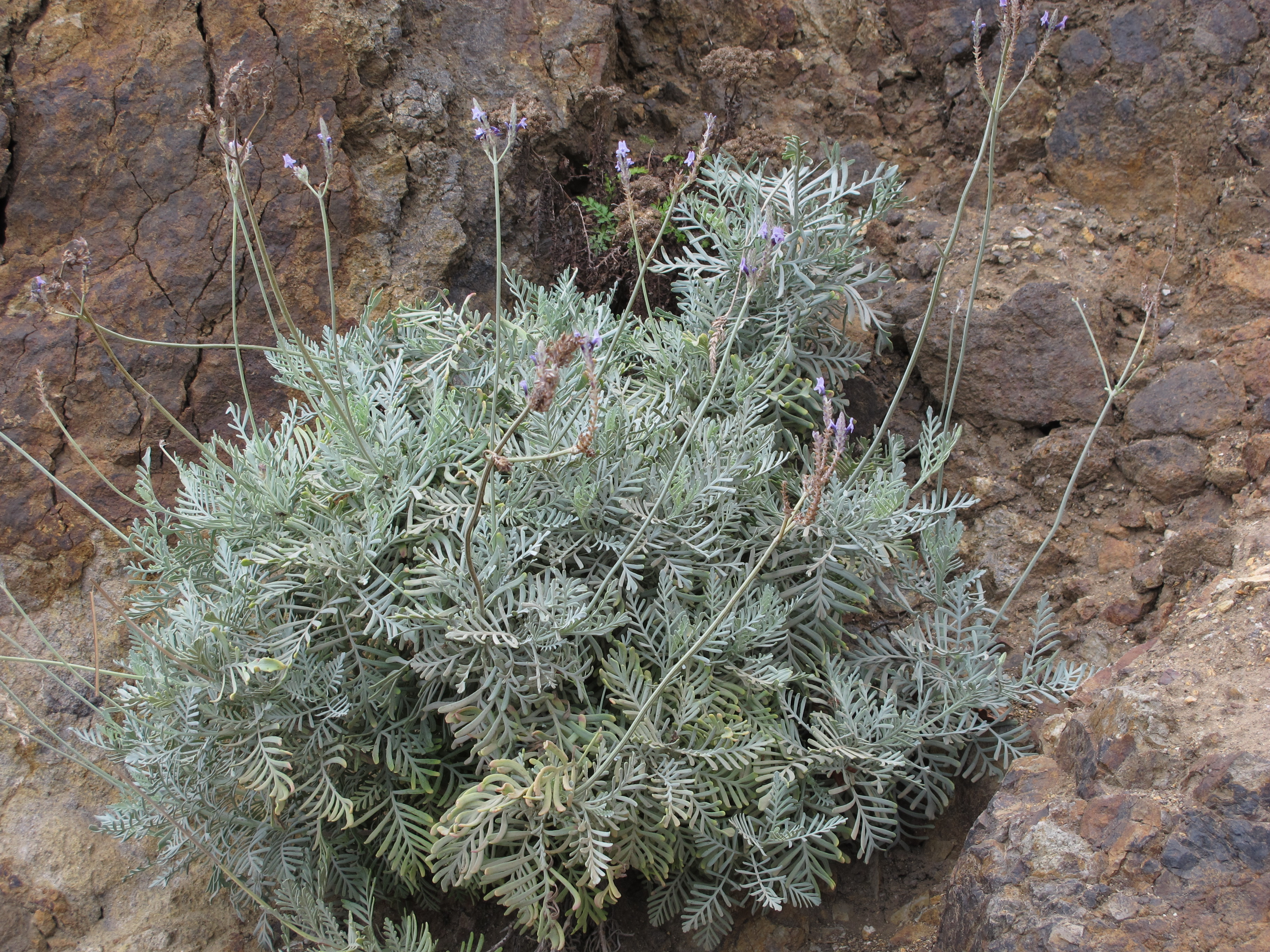
- In habitat, near Taganana, Tenerife

Scientific classification
- Kingdom: Plantae
- Clade: Tracheophytes
- Clade: Angiosperms
- Clade: Eudicots
- Clade: Asterids
- Order: Lamiales
- Family: Lamiaceae
- Genus: Lavandula
- Species: L. buchii

Binomial name
- Lavandula buchii Webb & Berthel.

Synonyms
- Lavandula pinnata var. buchii (Webb & Berthel.) Benth.

= Lavandula buchii =

Species of plant

Lavandula buchii is a species of flowering plant in the family Lamiaceae, endemic to Tenerife in the Canary Islands. It was first described by Philip Barker-Webb and Sabin Berthelot, as part of an 1844–1850 publication that has been dated to 1844.

== Description ==
Lavandula buchii is a woody shrub growing up to 1 metre high. Inflorescences are long, branched, ovate bracts, calyx hairy with violet veins; the corolla blue-violet. Leaves are pinnate and sometimes bipinnate, with somewhat fleshy, greyish leaflets.

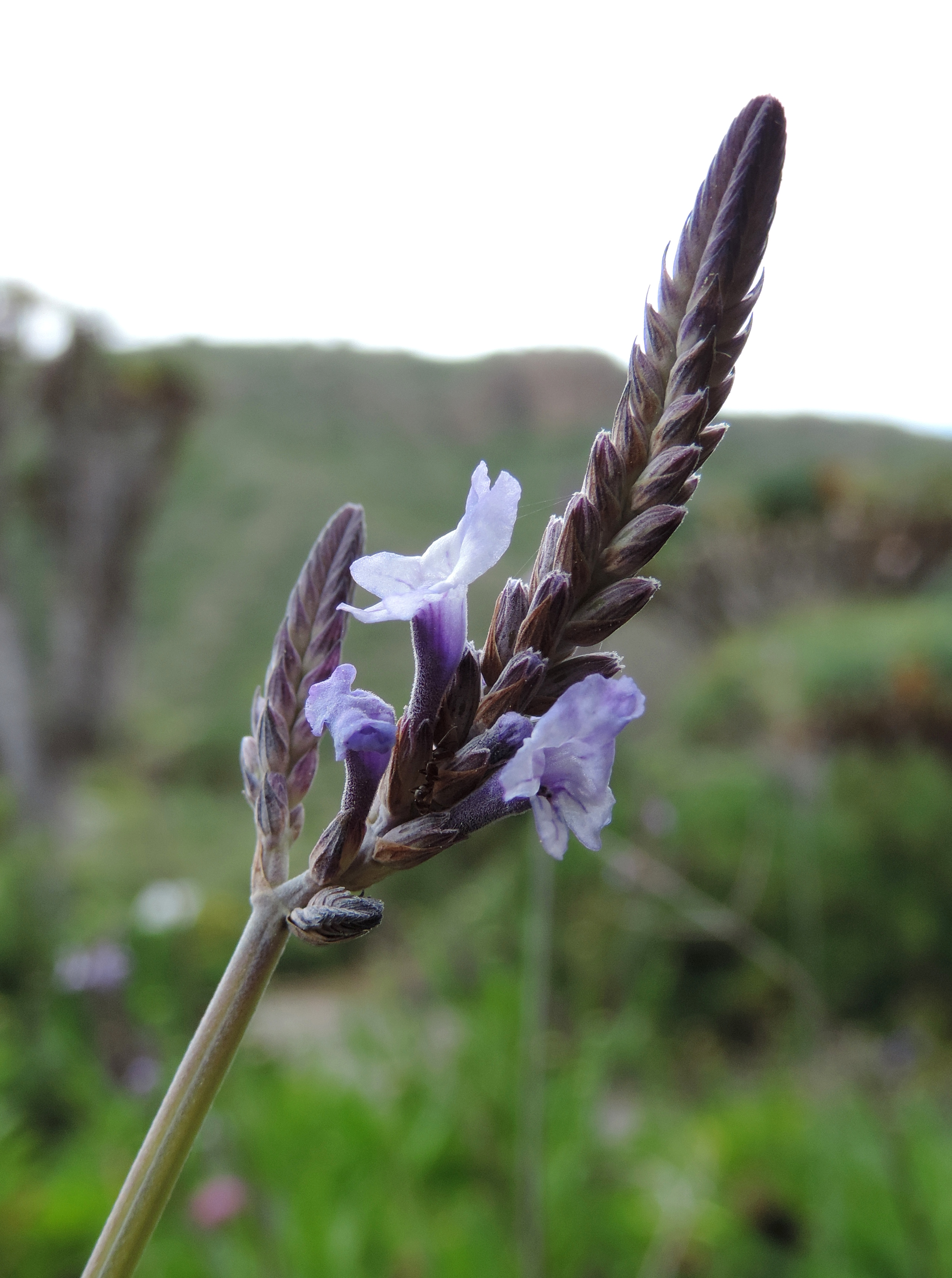
Flowers
