= Global Strategy for Plant Conservation =

International conservation program

The Global Strategy for Plant Conservation (GSPC) is a program of the UN's Convention on Biological Diversity founded in 1999. The GSPC seeks to slow the pace of plant extinction around the world through a strategy of 5 objectives.

== History ==
The Global Strategy for Plant Conservation (GSPC) began as a grass-roots movement in 1999 with discussions at the 16th International Botanical Congress in St. Louis. A group of specialists subsequently met in Gran Canaria and issued the 'Gran Canaria Declaration Calling for a Global Plant Conservation Strategy'. Following extensive consultations, the fleshed-out GSPC was adopted by the Parties to the Convention on Biological Diversity (CBD) in April 2002. The initial version of the GSPC sought to slow the pace of plant extinction around the world by 2010, with Target 1 of the Strategy calling for the completion of "a widely accessible working list of all known plant species, as a step towards a complete world Flora". In 2010, Version 1 of The Plant List was launched, intended to be comprehensive for species of vascular plants (flowering plants, conifers, ferns and their allies) and Bryophytes (mosses and liverworts).

In 2010, GSPC targets were updated through an extensive consultation process within the CBD, with revised targets for 2020. In 2012, the Missouri Botanical Garden, The New York Botanical Garden, the Royal Botanic Garden Edinburgh and the Royal Botanic Gardens in Kew agreed to collaborate to develop a World Flora Online in response to the revised GSPC Target 1.

== Vision ==
Our lives depend on plants and without them the ecosystem would cease to function. Our survival and survival of all species are tied to plants. The Global Strategy for Plant Conservation seeks to limit the rates of plant diversity loss, while having a positive vision regards the efforts and the results. Forming an idea of having a sustainable future where plant species are able to thrive and be maintained (including their survival, preservation of their communities and habitats, plants' gene pool and ecological associations) under supporting human activities, and in turn where the diversity of plant species improve and support the livelihoods and well-being.

== Mission ==
The Global Strategy for Plant Conservation is a platform that gathers efforts from all the different levels-local, national, regional and global, in order to strengthen the needs for conservation and substantiality and implement steps toward the awareness and actions that should be made.

== Implementation ==
Sufficient human, technical and financial resources are contained within the strategy in order to prevent the slowing down of the program in case of limited funds and lack of training. Some of the implementation strategies include these involving a range of actors:

(i) International initiatives (e.g., international conventions, intergovernmental organizations, United Nations agencies, multilateral aid agencies);
(ii) Members of the Global Partnership for Plant Conservation;
(iii) Conservation and research organizations (including protected-area management boards, botanic gardens, gene banks, universities, research institutes, non-governmental organizations and networks of non-governmental organizations);
(iv) Communities and major groups (including indigenous and local communities, farmers, women, youth);
(v) Governments (central, regional, local authorities); and
(vi) The private sector

== Goals ==
The heart of the GSPC are five goals, expressed as a total of 16 targets. The five objectives and their 16 targets for 2020 are:

Objective I: Plant diversity is well understood, documented and recognized

- Target 1: An online flora of all known plants.
- Target 2: An assessment of the conservation status of all known plant species, as far as possible, to guide conservation action.
- Target 3: Information, research and associated outputs, and methods necessary to implement the Strategy developed and shared.

Objective II: Plant diversity is urgently and effectively conserved

- Target 4: At least 15% of each ecological region or vegetation type secured through effective management and/or restoration.
- Target 5: At least 75% of the most important areas for plant diversity of each ecological region protected with effective management in place for conserving plants and their genetic diversity.
- Target 6: At least 75% of production lands in each sector managed sustainably, consistent with the conservation of plant diversity.
- Target 7: At least 75% of known threatened plant species conserved in situ.
- Target 8: At least 75% of threatened plant species in ex situ collections, preferably in the country of origin, and at least 20 per cent available for recovery and restoration programmes.
- Target 9: 70% of the genetic diversity of crops including their wild relatives and other socio-economically valuable plant species conserved, while respecting, preserving and maintaining associated indigenous and local knowledge.
- Target 10: Effective management plans in place to prevent new biological invasions and to manage important areas for plant diversity that are invaded.

Objective III: Plant diversity is used in a sustainable and equitable manner

- Target 11: No species of wild flora endangered by international trade.
- Target 12: All wild harvested plant-based products sourced sustainably.
- Target 13: Indigenous and local knowledge innovations and practices associated with plant resources maintained or increased, as appropriate, to support customary use, sustainable livelihoods, local food security and health care.

Objective IV: Education and awareness about plant diversity, its role in sustainable livelihoods and importance to all life on earth is promoted

- Target 14: The importance of plant diversity and the need for its conservation incorporated into communication, education and public awareness programmes.

Objective V: The capacities and public engagement necessary to implement the Strategy have been developed

- Target 15: The number of trained people working with appropriate facilities sufficient according to national needs, to achieve the targets of this Strategy.
- Target 16: Institutions, networks and partnerships for plant conservation established or strengthened at national, regional and international levels to achieve the targets of this Strategy.

The GSPC was being put through a formal review of progress by the Convention on Biological Diversity, culminating in major discussions in May 2008 in Bonn, Germany at the 9th Conference of the Parties to the CBD.
