= The Plant List =

Encyclopedic list of scientific plant names

- Website type: Encyclopedia
- Available in: English
- Creators: Royal Botanic Gardens, Kew and Missouri Botanical Garden
- Website: www.theplantlist.org
- Launched: December 2010
- Current status: Inactive since 2013 (version 1.1), superseded by World Flora Online

The Plant List was a list of botanical names of species of plants created by the Royal Botanic Gardens, Kew, and the Missouri Botanical Garden and launched in 2010. It was intended to be a comprehensive record of all known names of plant species over time, and was produced in response to Target 1 of the 2002–2010 Global Strategy for Plant Conservation (GSP C), to produce "An online flora of all known plants". It has not been updated since 2013, and has been superseded by World Flora Online.

== World Flora Online ==
In October 2012, the follow-up project World Flora Online was launched with the aim to publish an online flora of all known plants by 2020. This is a project of the United Nations Convention on Biological Diversity, with the aim of halting the loss of plant species worldwide by 2020. It is developed by a collaborative group of institutions around the world response to the 2011-2020 GSPC's updated Target 1. This aims to achieve an online Flora of all known plants by 2020. It was conceived in 2012 by an initial group of four institutions; the Missouri Botanical Garden, the New York Botanical Garden, the Royal Botanic Garden Edinburgh and the Royal Botanic Gardens, Kew.

There is a complementary project called the International Plant Names Index, in which Kew is also involved. The IPNI aims to provide details of publication and does not aim to determine which are accepted species names. Newly published names are automatically added from IPNI to the World Checklist of Selected Plant Families, a database which underlies the Plant List.

== Findings ==
The Plant List has 1,064,035 scientific plant names of species rank, of which 350,699 are accepted species names, belonging to 642 plant families and 17,020 plant genera. The Plant List accepts approximately 350,699 unique species, with 470,624 synonyms for those species, which suggests that many species have been referred to under more than one name. As of 2014, The Plant List has determined that another 243,000 names are "unresolved", meaning that botanists have so far been unable to determine whether they are a separate species or a duplication of the 350,699 unique species.

== Public attention ==
When The Plant List was launched in 2010 (the International Year of Biodiversity), it attracted media attention for its comprehensive approach. Fox News highlighted the number of synonyms encountered, suggesting that this reflected a "surprising lack" of biodiversity on earth." The Plant List also attracted attention for building on the work of English naturalist Charles Darwin, who started a plant list called the Index Kewensis (IK) in the 1880s. Kew has added an average of 6,000 species every year since the IK was first published with 400,000 names of species. However, the IK (which by 1913 avoided making taxonomic judgement in its citations) is currently included in the IPNI rather than the Plant List.

== See also ==
- Australian Plant Census
- Australian Plant Name Index
- Global Strategy for Plant Conservation, whose Target One states the need for "An online flora of all known plants."
- International Plant Names Index
- Plants of the World Online
- Wikispecies
