= Appendicularia =

Appendicularia may refer to:

- Appendicularia (plant), a genus in the plant family Melastomataceae
- Larvacean, an animal of the class Appendicularia in the subphylum Tunicata
  - Appendicularia (animal genus), a genus in the larvacean family Fritillariidae
