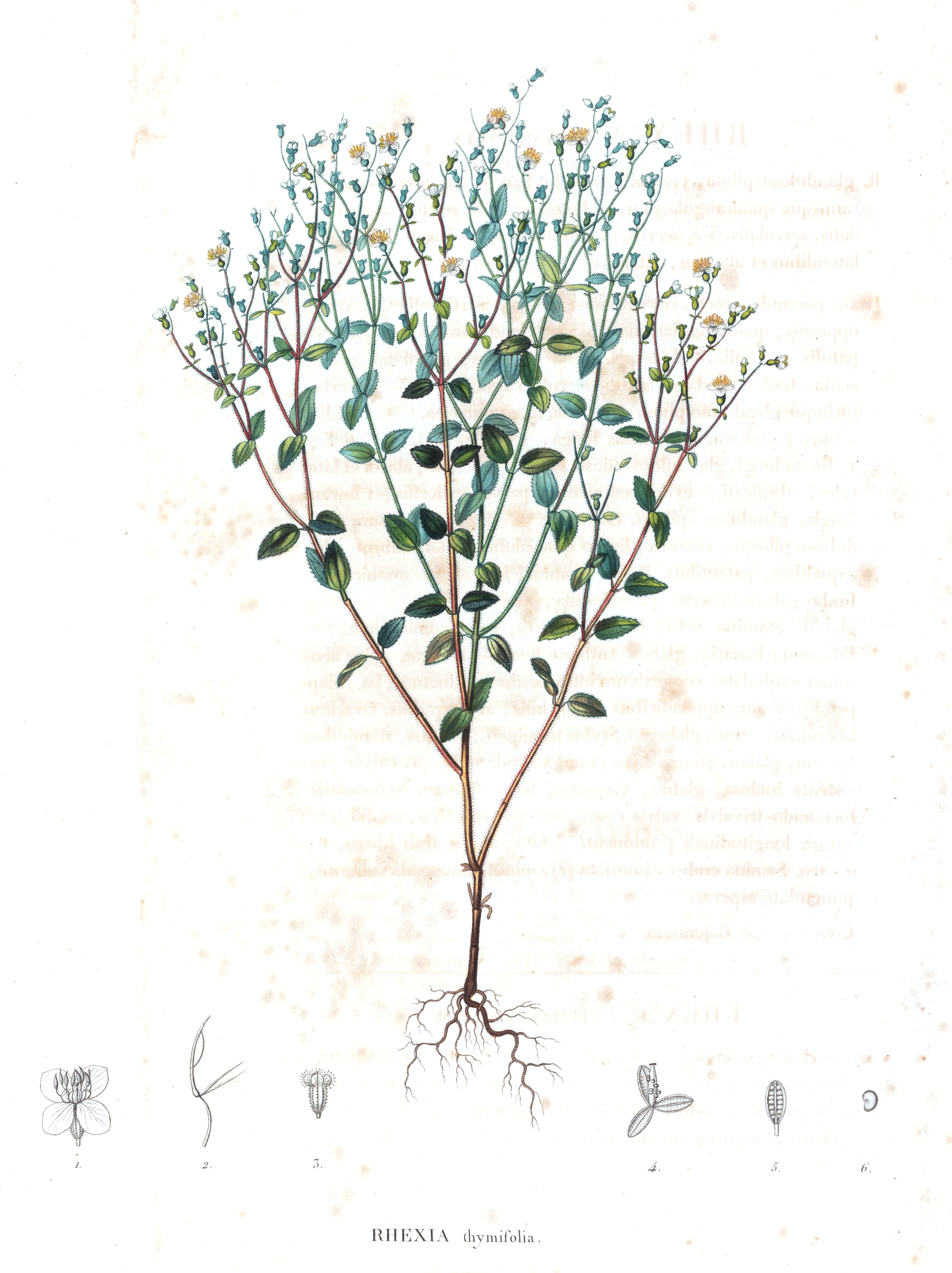
- Appendicularia thymifolia

Scientific classification
- Kingdom: Plantae
- Clade: Tracheophytes
- Clade: Angiosperms
- Clade: Eudicots
- Clade: Rosids
- Order: Myrtales
- Family: Melastomataceae
- Genus: Appendicularia; DC.

Species
- Appendicularia entomophila Appendicularia thymifolia

= Appendicularia (plant) =

Genus of flowering plants

Appendicularia is a genus of plants in the family Melastomataceae.

== Species ==
The genus has two species:

- Appendicularia entomophila
- Appendicularia thymifolia
