= Macrolenes =

Macrolenes may refer to:

- Macrolenes (beetle), a genus of beetles in the family Chrysomelidae
- Macrolenes (plant), a genus of plants in the family Melastomataceae
