= Macrolenes (plant) =

Scientific classification
- Kingdom: Plantae
- Clade: Tracheophytes
- Clade: Angiosperms
- Clade: Eudicots
- Clade: Rosids
- Order: Myrtales
- Family: Melastomataceae
- Genus: Macrolenes; Naudin

Genus of plants

Macrolenes is a genus of flowering plants belonging to the family Melastomataceae.

Its native range is Indo-China to Western Malesia.

== Species ==
Species:

- Macrolenes annulata (Vent.) Naudin
- Macrolenes bipulvinata (Korth.) Bakh.f.
- Macrolenes bruneiensis Karton.
- Macrolenes dimorpha (Craib) J.F.Maxwell
- Macrolenes echinulata (Naudin) Bakh.f.
- Macrolenes esetosa (Craib) Karton.
- Macrolenes glabrata M.P.Nayar
- Macrolenes hirsuta (Cogn.) J.F.Maxwell
- Macrolenes muscosa (Blume) Bakh.f.
- Macrolenes neglecta M.P.Nayar
- Macrolenes nemorosa (Jack) Bakh.f.
- Macrolenes pachygyna (Korth.) M.P.Nayar
- Macrolenes rufolanata (Ridl.) J.F.Maxwell
- Macrolenes stellulata (Jack) Bakh.f.
- Macrolenes subulata J.F.Maxwell
- Macrolenes tuberculata Karton.
- Macrolenes veldkampii Karton.
