= Mentzelia chrysantha =

Conservation status
- Imperiled (NatureServe)

Scientific classification
- Kingdom: Plantae
- Clade: Tracheophytes
- Clade: Angiosperms
- Clade: Eudicots
- Clade: Asterids
- Order: Cornales
- Family: Loasaceae
- Genus: Mentzelia
- Species: M. chrysantha

Binomial name
- Mentzelia chrysantha Engelm.

Synonyms
- List: Hesperaster chrysanthus Cockerell; Nuttallia chrysantha (Engelm.) Greene; Touterea chrysantha (Engelm.) Rydb.

Plant species in the chile-nettle family

Mentzelia chrysantha is a species of flowering plant in the Loasaceae known by the common names gold blazingstar and golden blazingstar. It is endemic to Colorado in the United States.

This species is a biennial or monocarpic perennial herb. The stem is up to 60 centimeters tall. It has leaves up to 15 centimeters long with toothed edges. The plant is coated in hairs. The flower has 10 yellow petals. Blooming occurs in July through September. The fruit is a capsule. This species is similar to Mentzelia reverchonii, which sometimes grows with it. The two can be distinguished by differences in the seeds.

This plant is endemic to the Arkansas River Valley in Fremont and Pueblo Counties in Colorado. There are 28 occurrences, all located within 20 miles of the community of Portland.

This species grows in an arid river valley which gets hot during the summers. Summer is generally the wettest season in this region, and it is the time when the plant experiences most of its growth. It is likely a calciphile, as it grows on calcium-rich geological substrates, such as limestone. The plant can be found on disturbed, barren slopes in the river valley, where it is often the only plant growing in abundance. It is often found on road cuts. It is adapted to disturbed habitat, and it grows on crumbling slopes. This may be because it cannot tolerate much competition from other plants. The habitat is sometimes pinyon-juniper woodland. Associated plants include Frankenia jamesii and Atriplex canescens. This species can be found growing with rare plants such as Parthenium tetraneuris and Mirabilis rotundifolia.

The main threat to the species is residential development in the habitat. Development is occurring in the Arkansas River Valley, and this has consumed potential habitat for the plant. Mining is common in the region. Gravel and substrates used for making cement are mined in the area.
