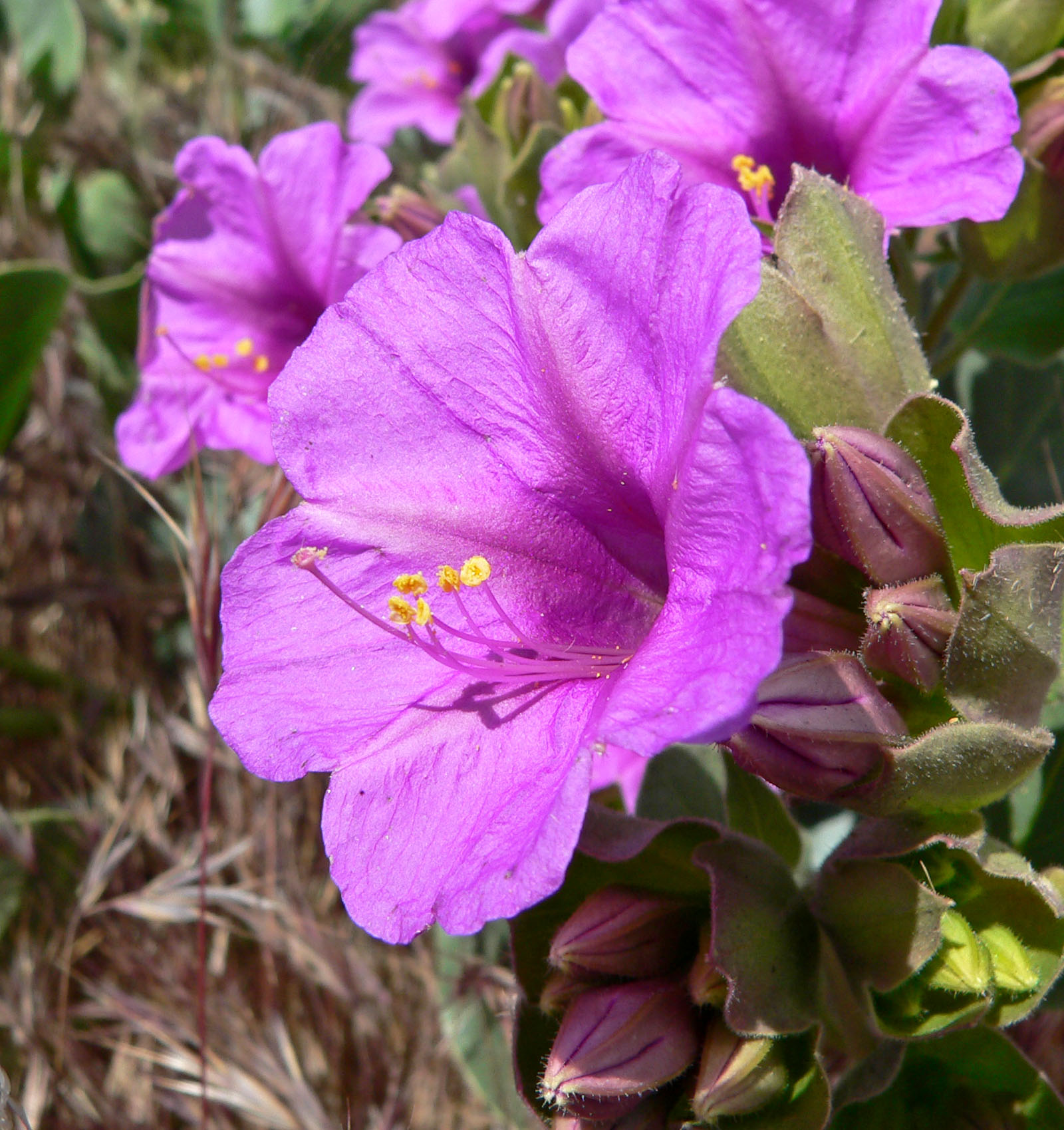

Conservation status
- Secure (NatureServe)

Scientific classification
- Kingdom: Plantae
- Clade: Tracheophytes
- Clade: Angiosperms
- Clade: Eudicots
- Order: Caryophyllales
- Family: Nyctaginaceae
- Genus: Mirabilis
- Species: M. multiflora

Binomial name
- Mirabilis multiflora (Torr.) A.Gray

Synonyms
- Oxybaphus multiflorus Torr. (1827); Quamoclidion multiflorum (Torr.) A.Gray (1853)

= Mirabilis multiflora =

Western North American species of four-o'clock

Mirabilis multiflora is a species of flowering plant in the four o'clock family known by the common names Colorado four-o'clock or desert four-o'clock that is native to the southwestern United States from California to Colorado and Texas, as well as far northern Mexico, where it grows in mostly dry habitat types in a number of regions.

== Description ==
It is a perennial herb growing upright to about 80 centimetres (31 in) in maximum height. The leaves are oppositely arranged on the spreading stem branches. Each fleshy leaf has an oval or rounded blade up to 12 centimetres (4.7 in) long and is hairless or sparsely hairy. In winter, the plant dies back to the ground and its stem breaks off at ground level (leaving no hint of its root location), though it reemerges in mid winter or spring. It dies back in extreme drought as well.

The flowers occur in leaf axils on the upper branches. Usually six flowers bloom in a bell-shaped involucre of five partly fused bracts. Each five-lobed, funnel-shaped flower is 4 to 6 centimetres (1.6 to 2.4 in) wide and magenta in color.

== Taxonomy ==
Mirabilis multiflora was given its first scientific description by the botanist John Torrey in 1827 with the name Oxybaphus multiflorus. It is described by Asa Gray in 1853 as Quamoclidion multiflorum and in 1859 with the accepted name as Mirabilis multiflora.

=== Names ===
Mirabilis multiflora is known in English by the common name of "Colorado four-o'clock". It is also known as "desert four-o'clock", however it occasionally shares this common name with Mirabilis tenuiloba and with Mirabilis laevis var. retrorsa. It is also sometimes called the "showy four-o'clock" or "maravilla".

== Uses ==
Among the Zuni people, the powdered root is mixed with flour, made into a bread, and used to decrease appetite. An infusion of the root is taken and rubbed on the abdomen of hungry adults and children. An infusion of the powdered root is taken by adults or children after overeating.

== Pollination ==
M. multiflora's reproduction is dependent on hawkmoths for pollination. Two primary pollinators are the hawkmoths Hyles lineata and Manduca quinquemaculata.

== Gallery ==
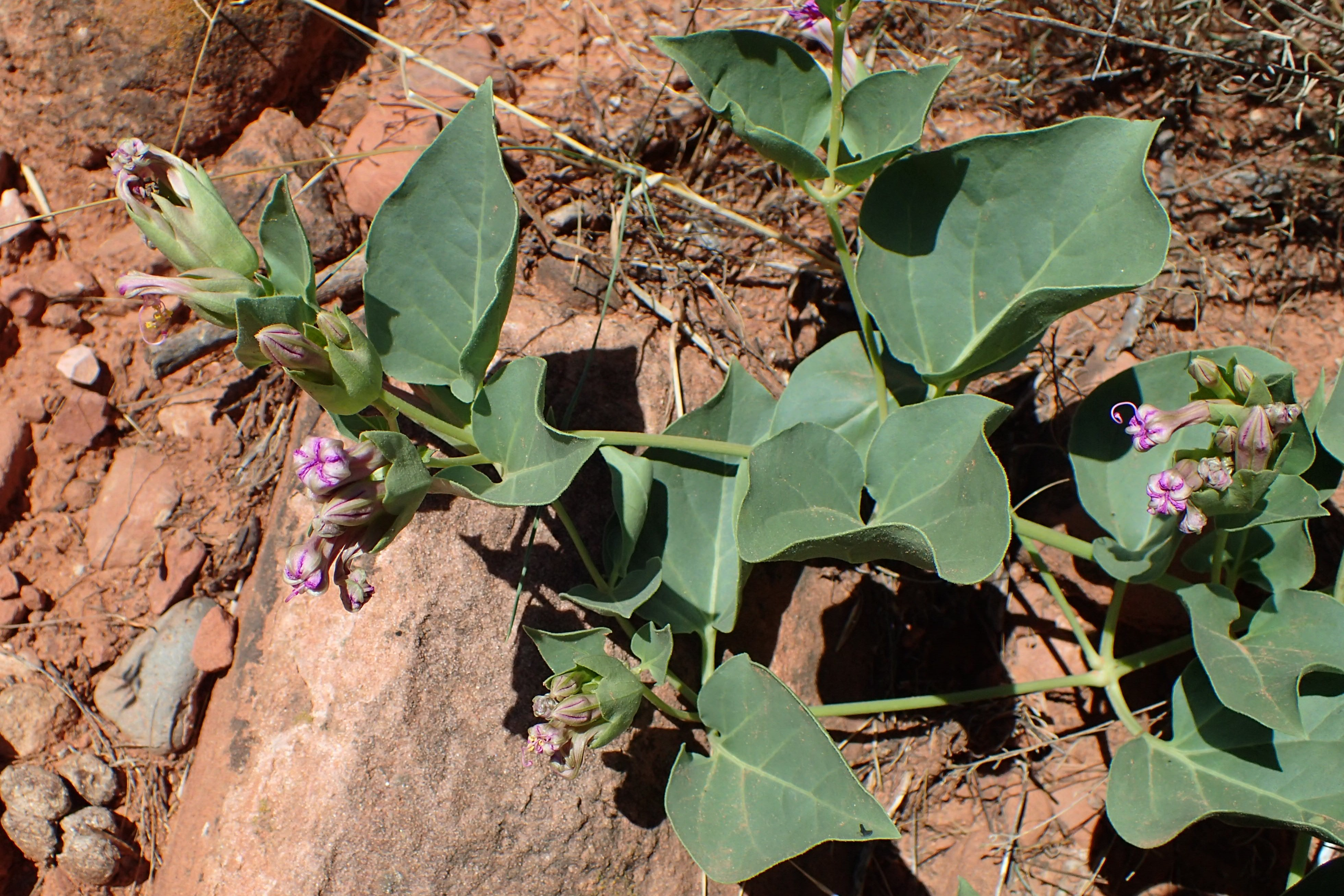

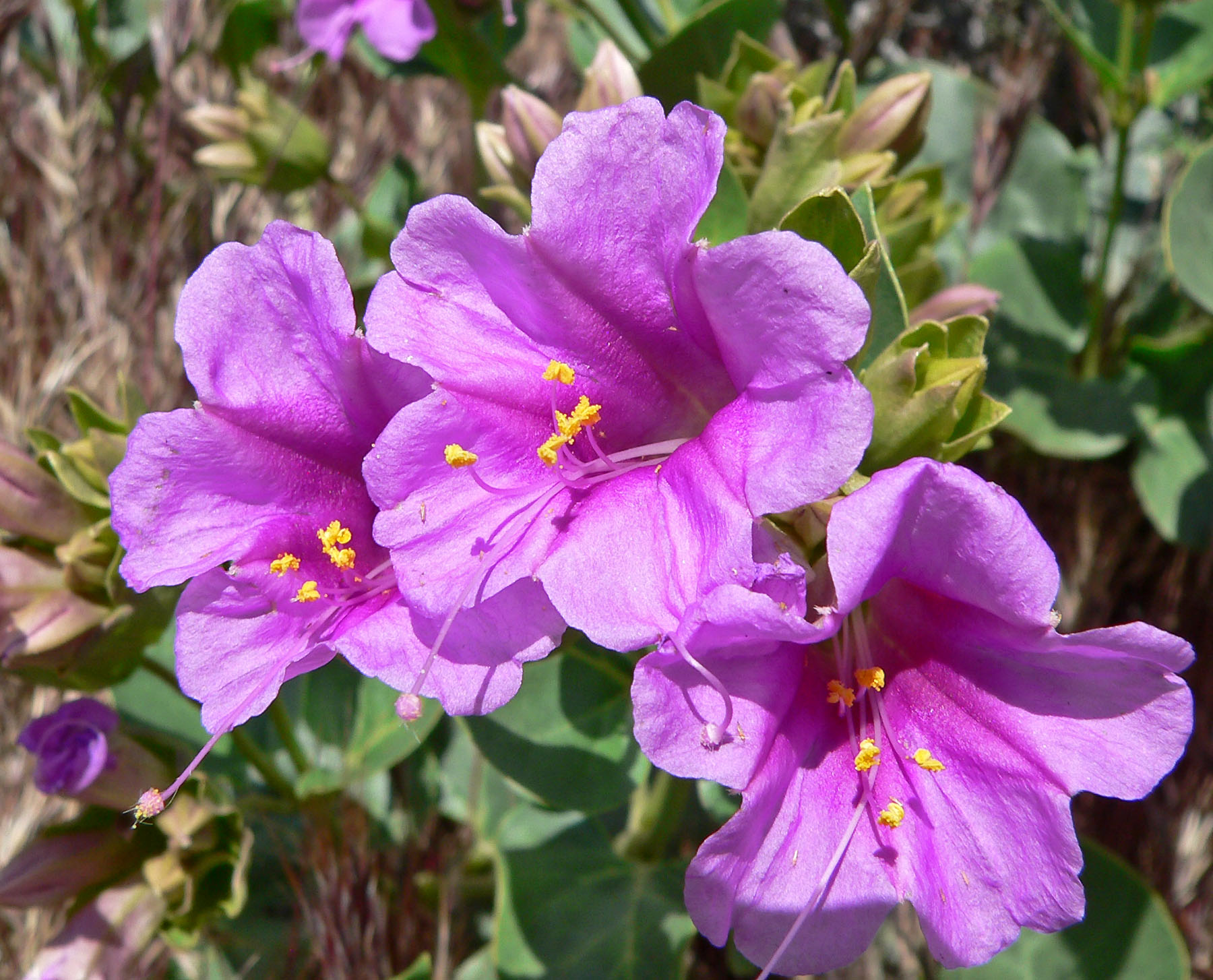

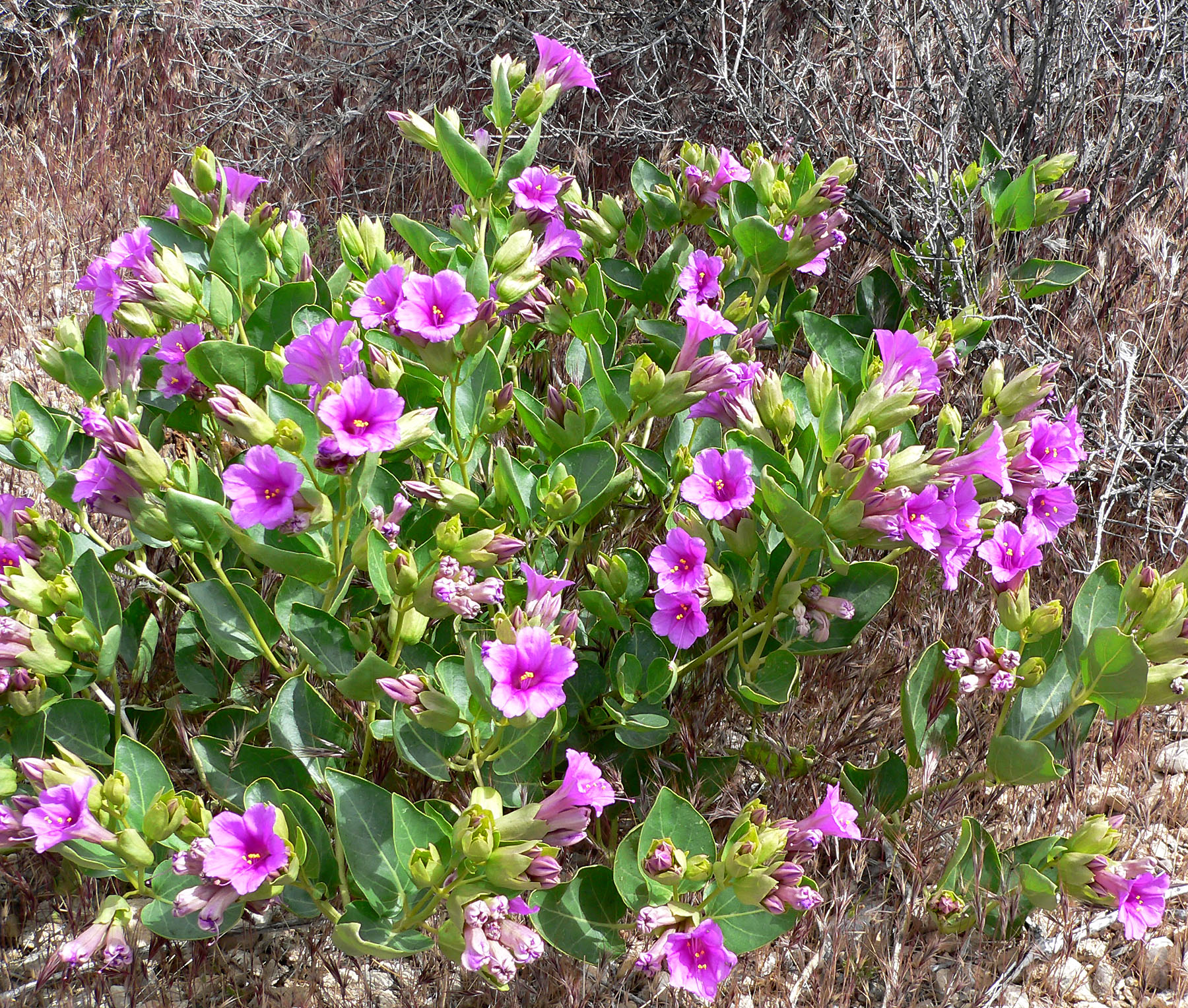

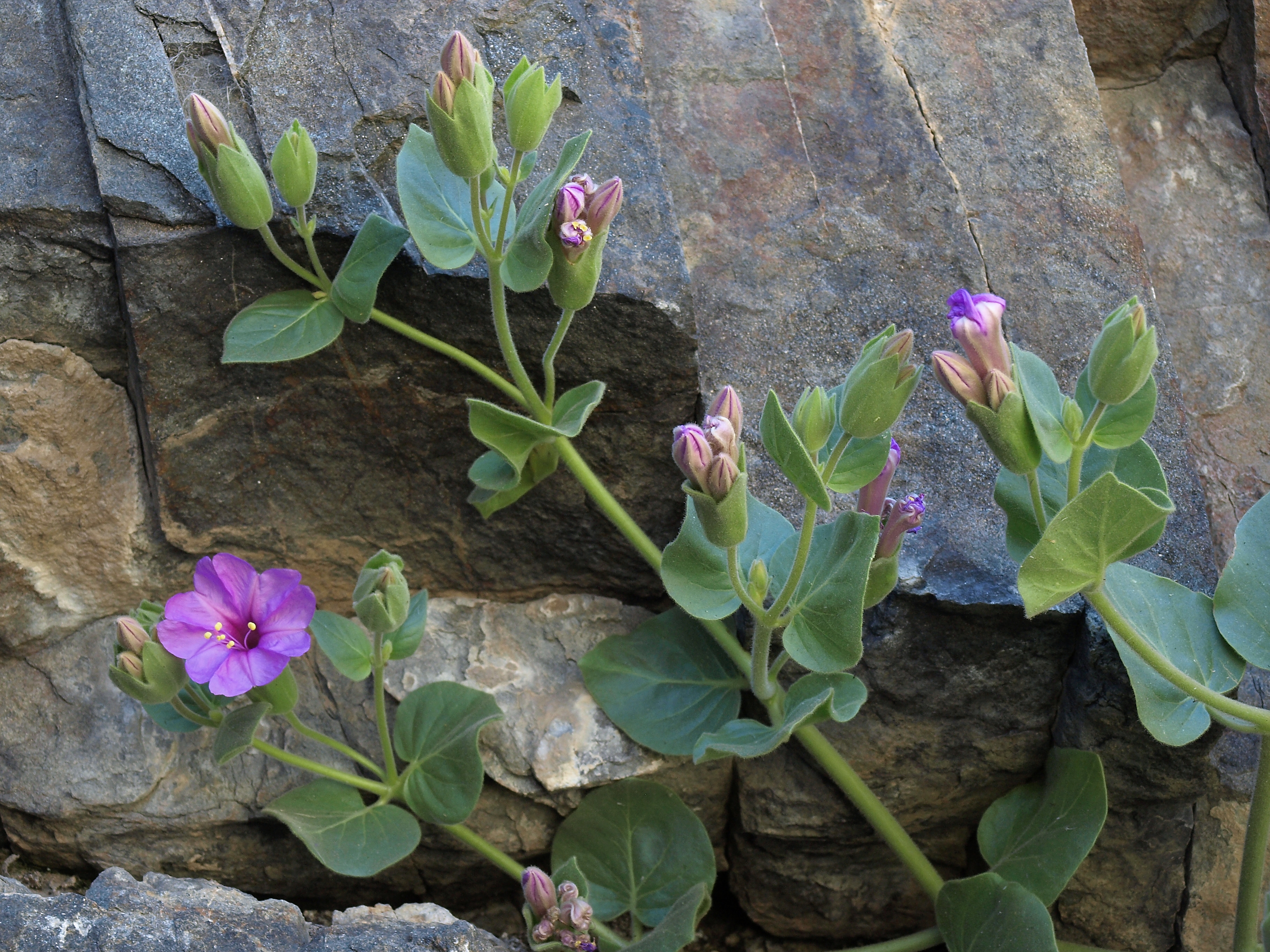

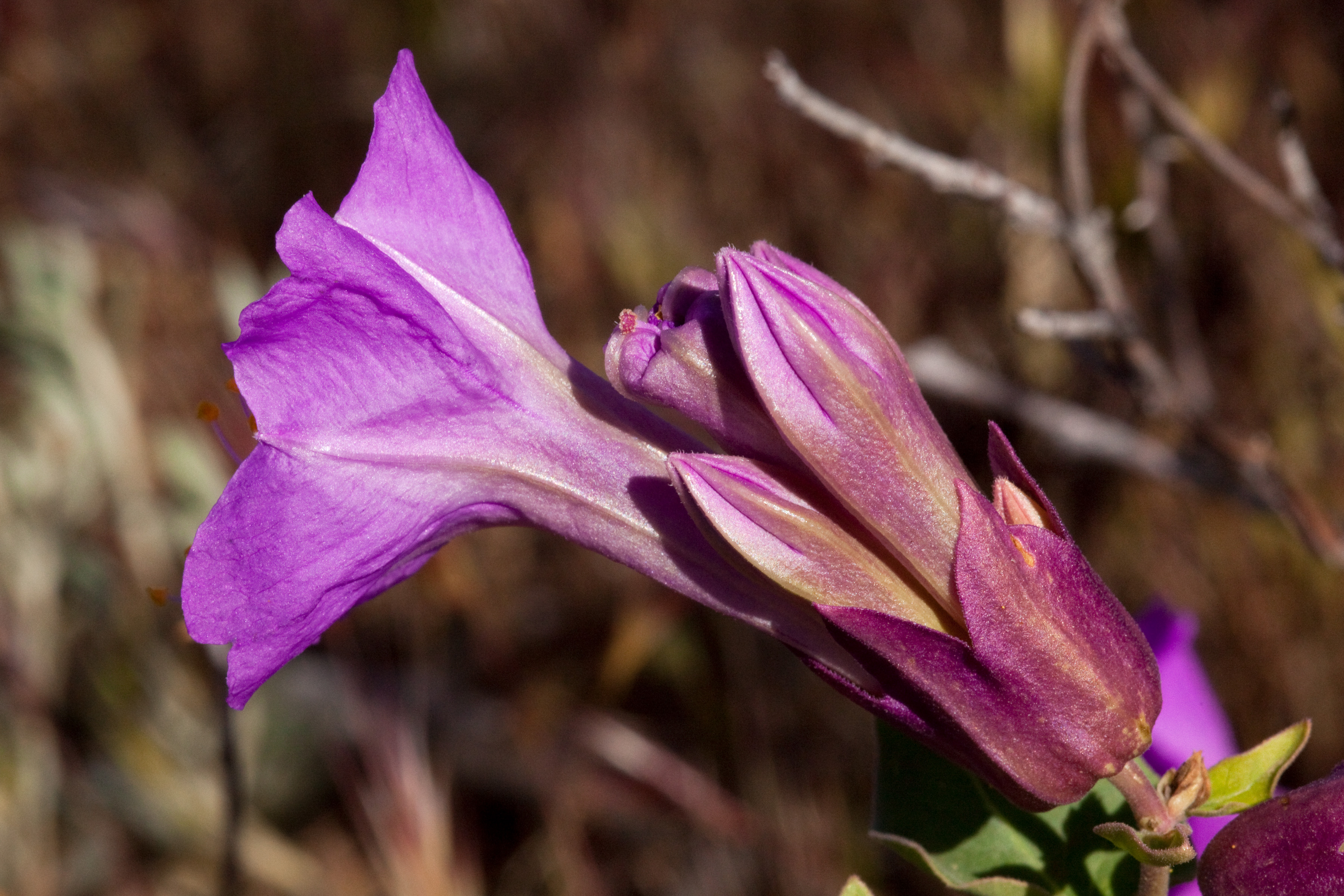

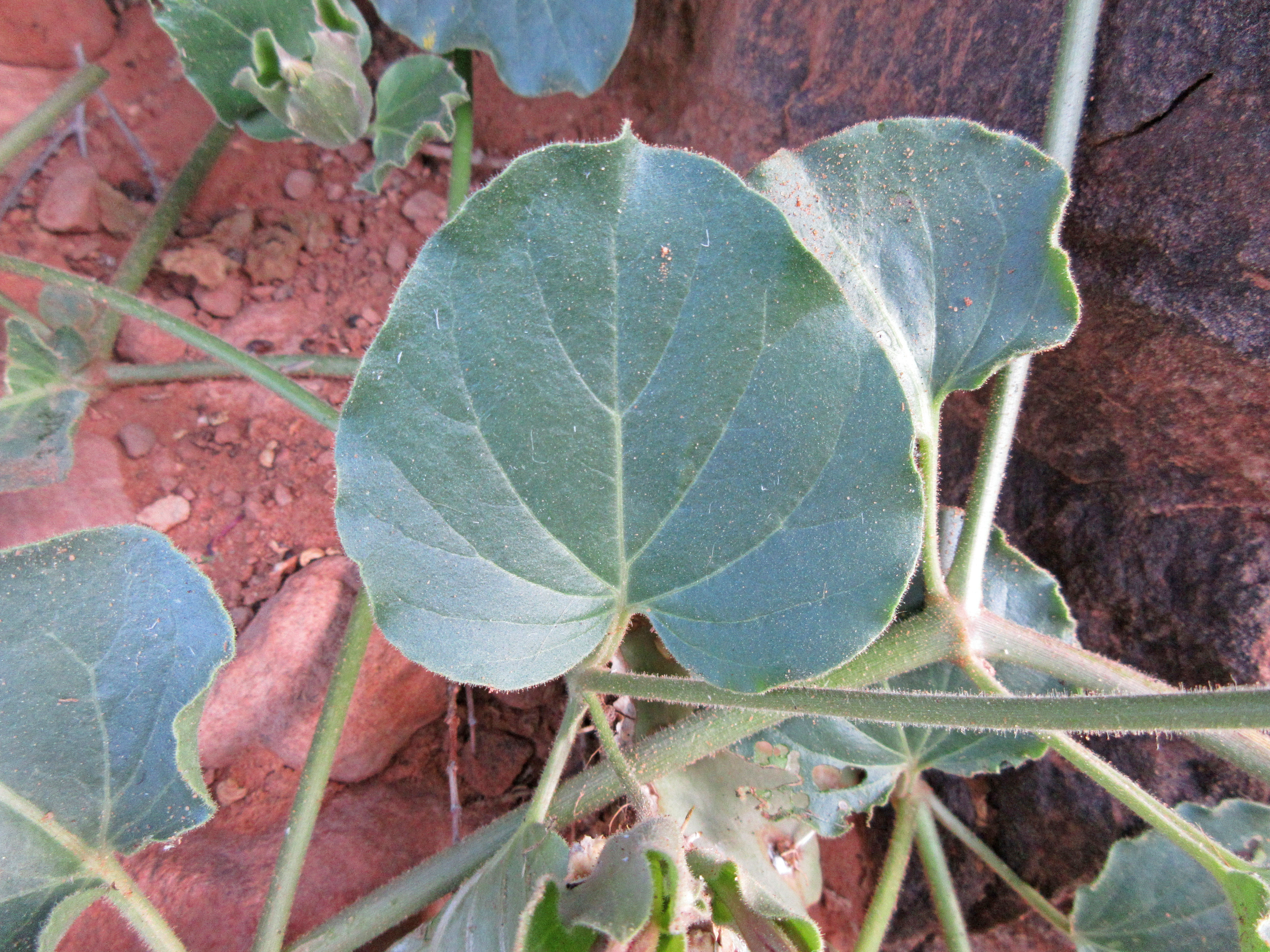
