= Giant four o'clock =

Giant four o'clock is a common name for several plants and may refer to:

- Mirabilis gigantea
- Mirabilis multiflora
