= Mirabilis elegans =

Scientific classification
- Kingdom: Plantae
- Clade: Tracheophytes
- Clade: Angiosperms
- Clade: Eudicots
- Order: Caryophyllales
- Family: Nyctaginaceae
- Genus: Mirabilis
- Species: M. elegans

Binomial name
- Mirabilis elegans (Choisy) Heimerl

Synonyms
- Allionia arenaria (Heimerl) Standl.; Allionia elegans (Choisy) Kuntze; Mirabilis arenaria Heimerl; Oxybaphus elegans Choisy

Species of plant

Mirabilis elegans is a species of flowering plants. It is found in Chile and Peru.
