= Mirabilis rotundifolia =

Conservation status
- Imperiled (NatureServe)

Scientific classification
- Kingdom: Plantae
- Clade: Tracheophytes
- Clade: Angiosperms
- Clade: Eudicots
- Order: Caryophyllales
- Family: Nyctaginaceae
- Genus: Mirabilis
- Species: M. rotundifolia

Binomial name
- Mirabilis rotundifolia (Greene) Standl.

Synonyms
- List: Allionia polytricha Standl.; Allionia rotundifolia Greene; Oxybaphus polytrichus (Standl.) Barneby; Oxybaphus rotundifolius (Greene) Standl.

Plant species in the four o'clock family

Mirabilis rotundifolia is a species of flowering plant in the four o'clock family known by the common name roundleaf four o'clock. It is endemic to Colorado in the United States, where it is limited to the south-central part of the state. It occurs in the Arkansas River Valley in Fremont, Pueblo, and Las Animas Counties.

This perennial herb has hairy erect or upright stems measuring 20 to 30 centimeters long. The leaves have thick oval or round blades up to 7 centimeters long by 6 wide. The branching inflorescence has bell-shaped involucres each containing three purple-pink flowers about a centimeter wide. The flowers open in the morning and close by mid-morning or mid-day. The hairy fruit is about half a centimeter long.

This plant grows on the Smoky Hill Member of the Niobrara Formation, generally on outcrops of shale. The habitat is mostly barren terrain in shrubland and woodland ecosystems. Associated species include Frankenia jamesii.

The main threat to this rare species is residential development. There are 29 occurrences, but only 12 are in good condition.
