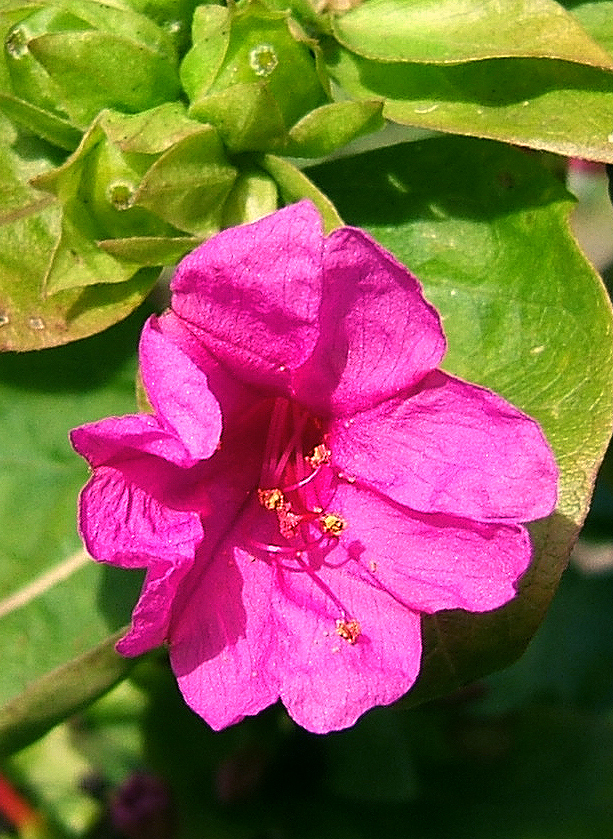
- Mirabilis jalapa

Scientific classification
- Kingdom: Plantae
- Clade: Tracheophytes
- Clade: Angiosperms
- Clade: Eudicots
- Order: Caryophyllales
- Family: Nyctaginaceae
- Tribe: Nyctagineae
- Genus: Mirabilis; L.

Species
- About 60; see text.

Synonyms
- Allioniella Rydb. Calymenia Pers. Calyxhymenia Ortega; Hermidium S.Watson; Hesperonia Standl. Nyctago Juss. Oxybaphus L’Hér. ex Willd. Quamoclidion Choisy

= Mirabilis (plant) =

Genus of flowering plants

Mirabilis is a genus of plants in the family Nyctaginaceae known as the four-o'clocks or umbrellaworts. The best known species may be Mirabilis jalapa, the plant most commonly called four o'clock.

There are several dozen species in the genus, of herbaceous plants, mostly found in the Americas. Some form tuberous roots that enable them to perennate through dry and cool seasons. They have small, often fragrant, deep-throated flowers.

== Description ==
Raphides are found in at least the flower and in abundance in the leaves and stem of at least M. violacea. In all examined species, raphides were found in the root, leaves, calyx, corolla, and also, but smaller and more tender, in the stamens, pistil, ovary, ovule, spermoderm and seed-leaves.

== Uses ==
Although best known as ornamental plants, at least one species, mauka (M. expansa), is grown for food.

== Selected species ==
- Mirabilis albida (Walter) Heimerl
- Mirabilis alipes (S.Watson) Pilz
- Mirabilis coccinea (Torr.) Benth. & Hook.f.
- Mirabilis elegans (Choisy) Heimerl
- Mirabilis expansa (Ruiz & Pav.) Standl.
- Mirabilis greenei S.Watson
- Mirabilis himalaica (Edgew.) Heimerl
  - Mirabilis himalaica var. chinensis Heimerl
  - Mirabilis himalaica var. himalaica
- Mirabilis jalapa L.
- Mirabilis laevis (Benth.) Curran
  - Mirabilis laevis var. crassifolia (Choisy) Spellenb.
  - Mirabilis laevis var. laevis
  - Mirabilis laevis var. retrorsa (A.Heller) Jeps.
  - Mirabilis laevis var. villosa (Kellogg) Spellenb.
- Mirabilis linearis (Pursh) Heimerl
  - Mirabilis linearis var. decipiens (Standl.) S.L.Welsh
  - Mirabilis linearis var. linearis
  - Mirabilis linearis var. subhispida (Heimerl) Spellenb.
- Mirabilis longiflora L.
- Mirabilis macfarlanei Constance & Rollins
- Mirabilis multiflora (Torr.) A.Gray
- Mirabilis nyctaginea (Michx.) MacMill.
- Mirabilis oblongifolia
- Mirabilis oxybaphoides (A.Gray) A.Gray
- Mirabilis pumila
- Mirabilis rotundifolia (Greene) Standl.
- Mirabilis tenuiloba
- Mirabilis violacea (L.) Heimerl
- Mirabilis viscosa Cav.

== Bibliography ==
- Gulliver, George (1864). "Observations on Raphides and other Crystals". The Annals and Magazine of Natural History, Including Zoology, Botany, and Geology. Third Series. 14: 250–252.
