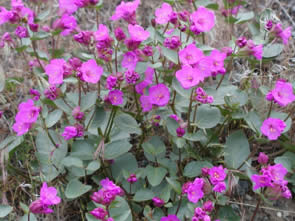

Conservation status
- Critically Imperiled (NatureServe)

Scientific classification
- Kingdom: Plantae
- Clade: Tracheophytes
- Clade: Angiosperms
- Clade: Eudicots
- Order: Caryophyllales
- Family: Nyctaginaceae
- Genus: Mirabilis
- Species: M. macfarlanei

Binomial name
- Mirabilis macfarlanei Constance & Rollins

= Mirabilis macfarlanei =

Species of flowering plant

Mirabilis macfarlanei is a rare species of flowering plant in the four o'clock family known by the common name MacFarlane's four o'clock. It is native to Idaho and Oregon in the United States, where it is only known from three river canyons. It faces a number of threats and is federally listed as a threatened species of the United States.

== Description ==
This plant is a perennial herb forming rounded clumps of stems up to a meter long. The plant grows from a taproot up to 3 inches (7.6 centimeters) wide and which may grow eight feet (2.4 meters) deep. It spreads via long rhizomes; what appear to be individual plants may be a number of clumps that arise from a single genetic individual. The purplish stems are lined with oval leaves up to 5 centimeters long by 5 wide. The inflorescence contains 3 to 7 flowers. The flower lacks a corolla of petals but has a calyx of magenta sepals 1.5 to 2.5 centimeters wide. The flowers are pollinated by solitary bees and the bumblebee species Bombus fervidus.

== Distribution and habitat ==
This plant grows in the canyons of the Snake, Salmon, and Imnaha Rivers in western Idaho and far eastern Oregon. The sandy soil overlies talus, and the often steep canyon slopes are easily eroded. The habitat is dry and relatively warm native grassland with some shrubs. Common grasses include bluebunch wheatgrass (Agropyron spicatum), sand dropseed (Sporobolus cryptandrus), and pine bluegrass (Poa secunda). Other plants in the habitat include yellow alyssum (Alyssum alyssoides), yarrow (Achillea millefolium), tufted evening primrose (Oenothera cespitosa), smooth sumac (Rhus glabra), rubber rabbitbrush (Chrysothamnus nauseosus), and hackberry (Celtis reticulata).

== Conservation ==
The plant was federally listed as an endangered species in 1979. Conservation efforts and the discovery of additional populations led to a more optimistic outlook for the plant and its status was downlisted to threatened in 1996. By 2000 there were eleven populations. Based on monitoring data collected on federal lands, the total population had neither increased nor decreased by 2008. It is difficult to count or estimate the number of plants because many clumps of stems can belong to one genetic individual.

This species faces a number of threats. Most all of the populations are on land that has been heavily grazed by domestic cattle and sheep, and trampling and predation by the animals can adversely affect the plant. Grazing still occurs in some parts of the plant's range, and it generally grows in steeper spots that have been less impacted by grazing. The area is also browsed by bighorn sheep, elk, deer, and mountain goats. The ecosystem is negatively impacted by introduced species of plants, including cheat grass (Bromus tectorum), St. John's wort (Hypericum perforatum), field bindweed (Convolvulus arvensis), Dalmatian toadflax (Linaria genistifolia ssp. dalmatica), and yellow starthistle (Centaurea solstitialis). The three-toed stem-boring weevil (Mecinus janthinus) has been released into four o'clock habitat that is infested with dalmatian toadflax to act as an agent of biological pest control against the weed. While the four o'clock generally survives wildfire due to its large underground rhizome, fires increase the number of non-native plants growing in the area. Insecticides may damage populations of important pollinating insects. Off-road vehicles and trampling by hikers may damage plants. Herbicide spraying has damaged populations. Insects have been noted to feed on the plant, including spittlebugs (Aprophora and Philaenus sp.) and the small moth Lithariapteryx abroniaeella.
