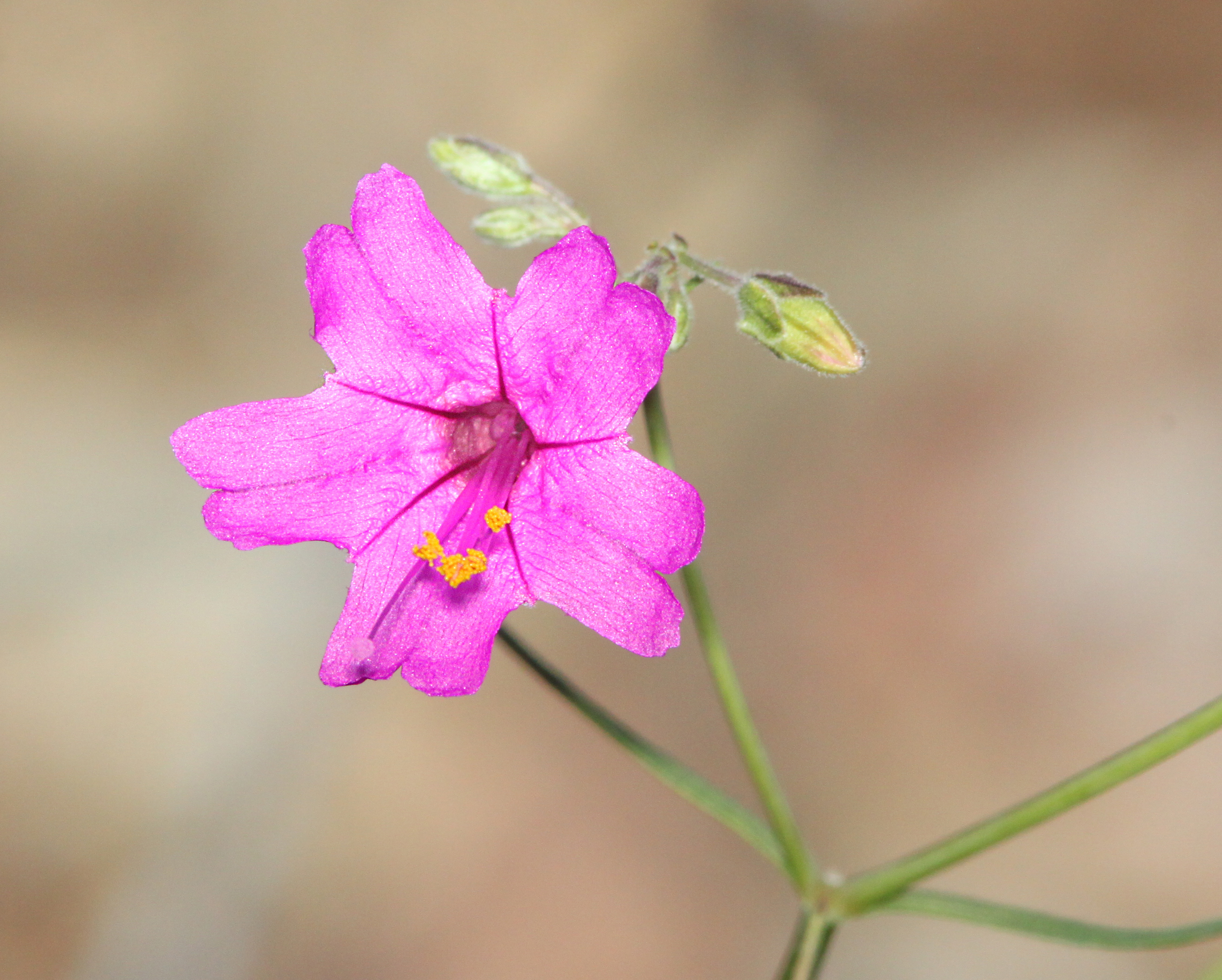
- Mirabilis coccinea at Patagonia Roadside Rest in Arizona

Scientific classification
- Kingdom: Plantae
- Clade: Tracheophytes
- Clade: Angiosperms
- Clade: Eudicots
- Order: Caryophyllales
- Family: Nyctaginaceae
- Genus: Mirabilis
- Species: M. coccinea

Binomial name
- Mirabilis coccinea (Torr.) Benth. & Hook.f.

= Mirabilis coccinea =

Species of flowering plant

Mirabilis coccinea, the scarlet four o'clock, is a spring wildflower native to the southwestern United States and northwestern Mexico. The plant grows to two feet with deep red flowers which open at night. The plant can be found on washes, plains, and rocky slopes.
