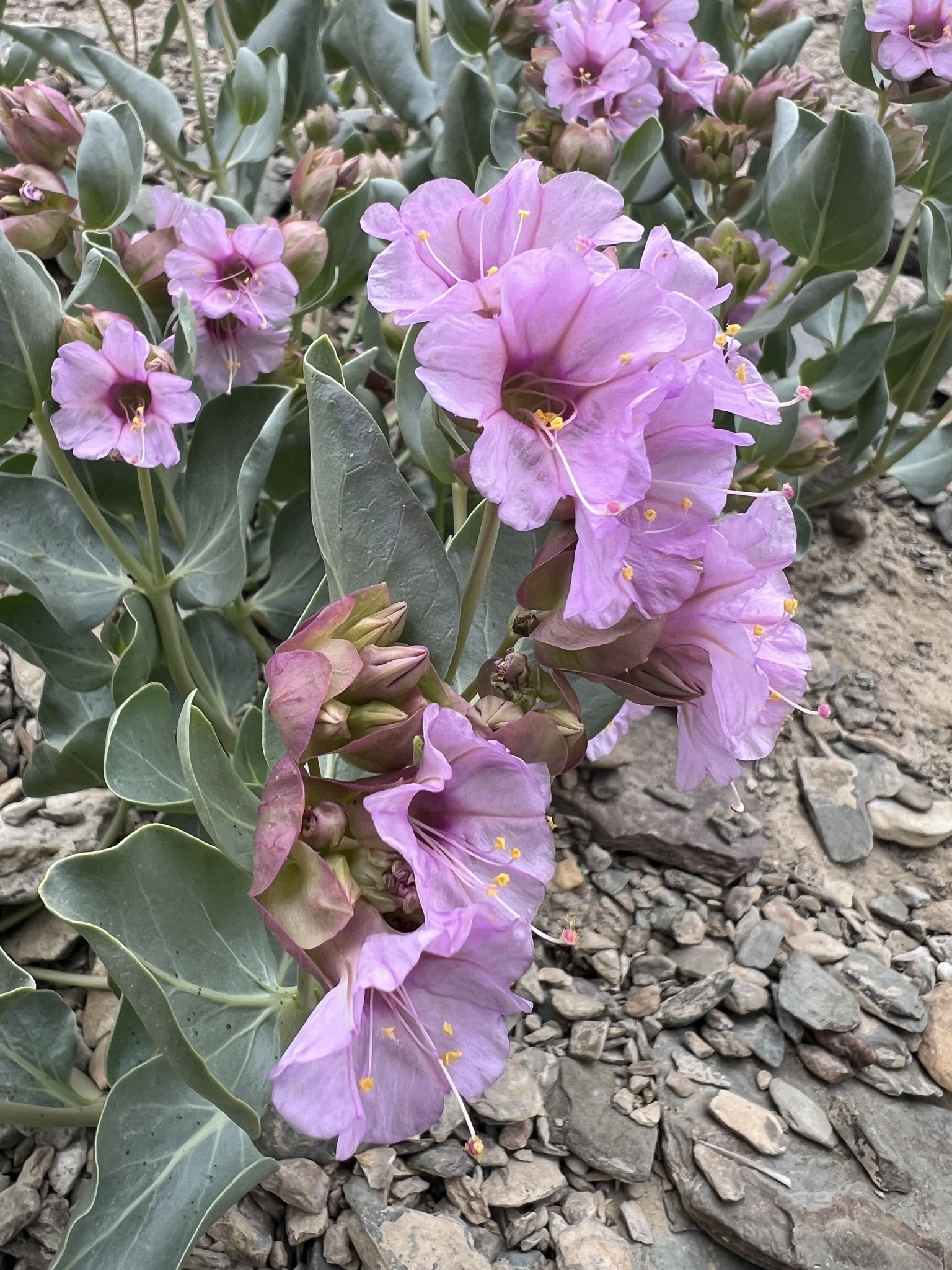
- Flowers photographed in the Inyo National Forest

Conservation status
- Apparently Secure (NatureServe)

Scientific classification
- Kingdom: Plantae
- Clade: Tracheophytes
- Clade: Angiosperms
- Clade: Eudicots
- Order: Caryophyllales
- Family: Nyctaginaceae
- Genus: Mirabilis
- Species: M. alipes

Binomial name
- Mirabilis alipes (S.Watson) Pils

Synonyms
- Hermidium alipes S.Watson

= Mirabilis alipes =

Plant species in the four o'clock family

Mirabilis alipes is a species of flowering plant in the four o'clock family known by the common name winged four o'clock. It is native to the southwestern United States from eastern California to western Colorado, where it grows in brush, woodland, and dry mountain slope habitat. It is a perennial herb growing in a clump near 40 centimetres (15 3/4 in) tall and up to 80 centimetres (31 1/2 in) wide. The leaves are oppositely arranged on the spreading stem branches. Each fleshy leaf has an oval or rounded blade up to 7 to 9 centimetres (2 3/4 to 3 1/2 in) long and is hairless or sparsely hairy. The flowers occur in leaf axils on the upper branches. Five to nine flowers bloom from a cup-shaped involucre of several partly fused bracts. Each five-lobed flower is about 1.5 centimetres (5/8 in) wide and magenta in color; cream-colored flowers are also known.
