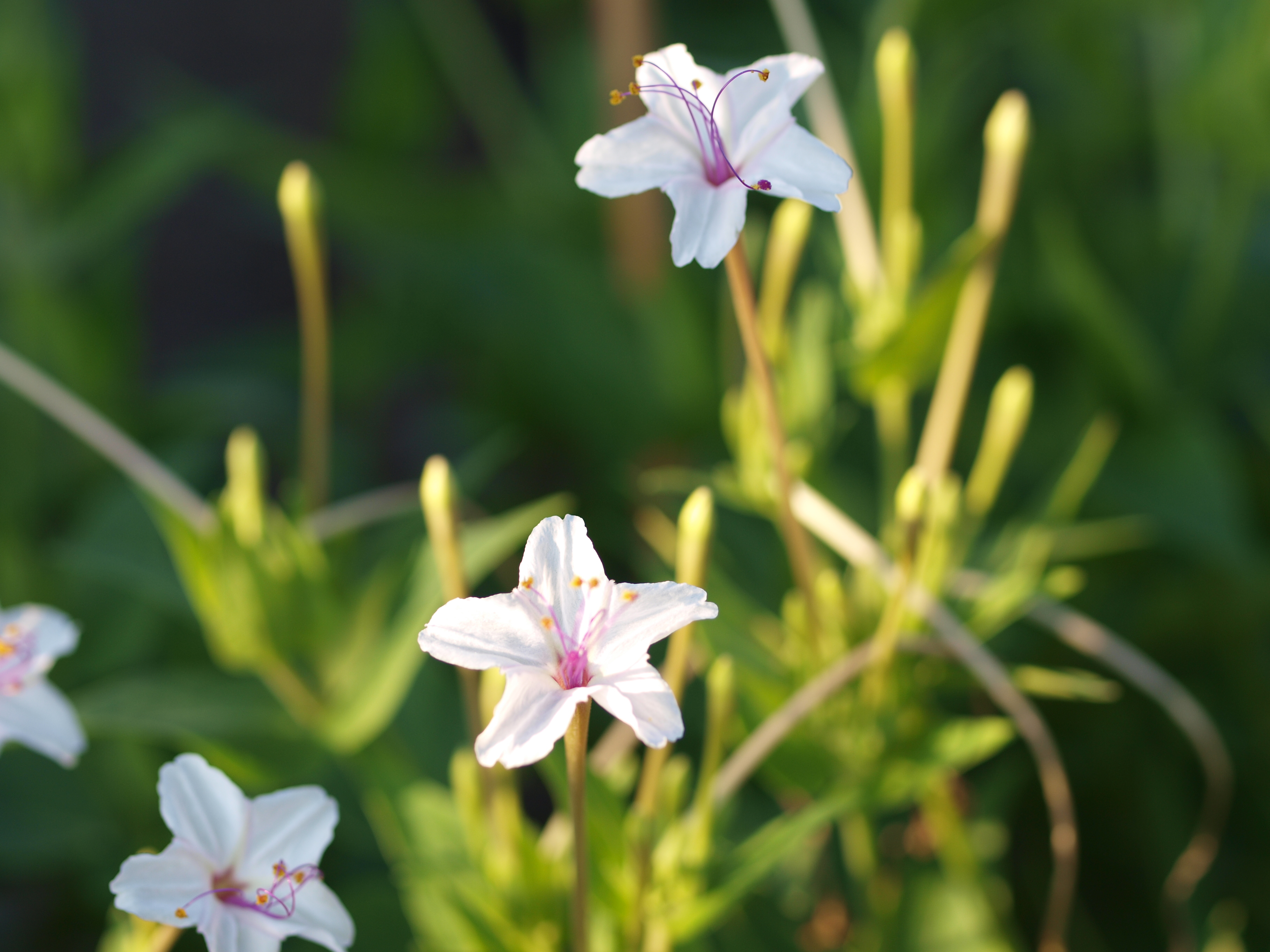

Scientific classification
- Kingdom: Plantae
- Clade: Tracheophytes
- Clade: Angiosperms
- Clade: Eudicots
- Order: Caryophyllales
- Family: Nyctaginaceae
- Genus: Mirabilis
- Species: M. longiflora

Binomial name
- Mirabilis longiflora L.

= Mirabilis longiflora =

Species of flowering plant

Mirabilis longiflora, also known as the sweet four o'clock or the long-flowered four o'Clock, is a species of flowering plant native to the southwestern United States and northern Mexico. The flowers open in the late afternoon and bloom through the night, hence the name.

== Description ==
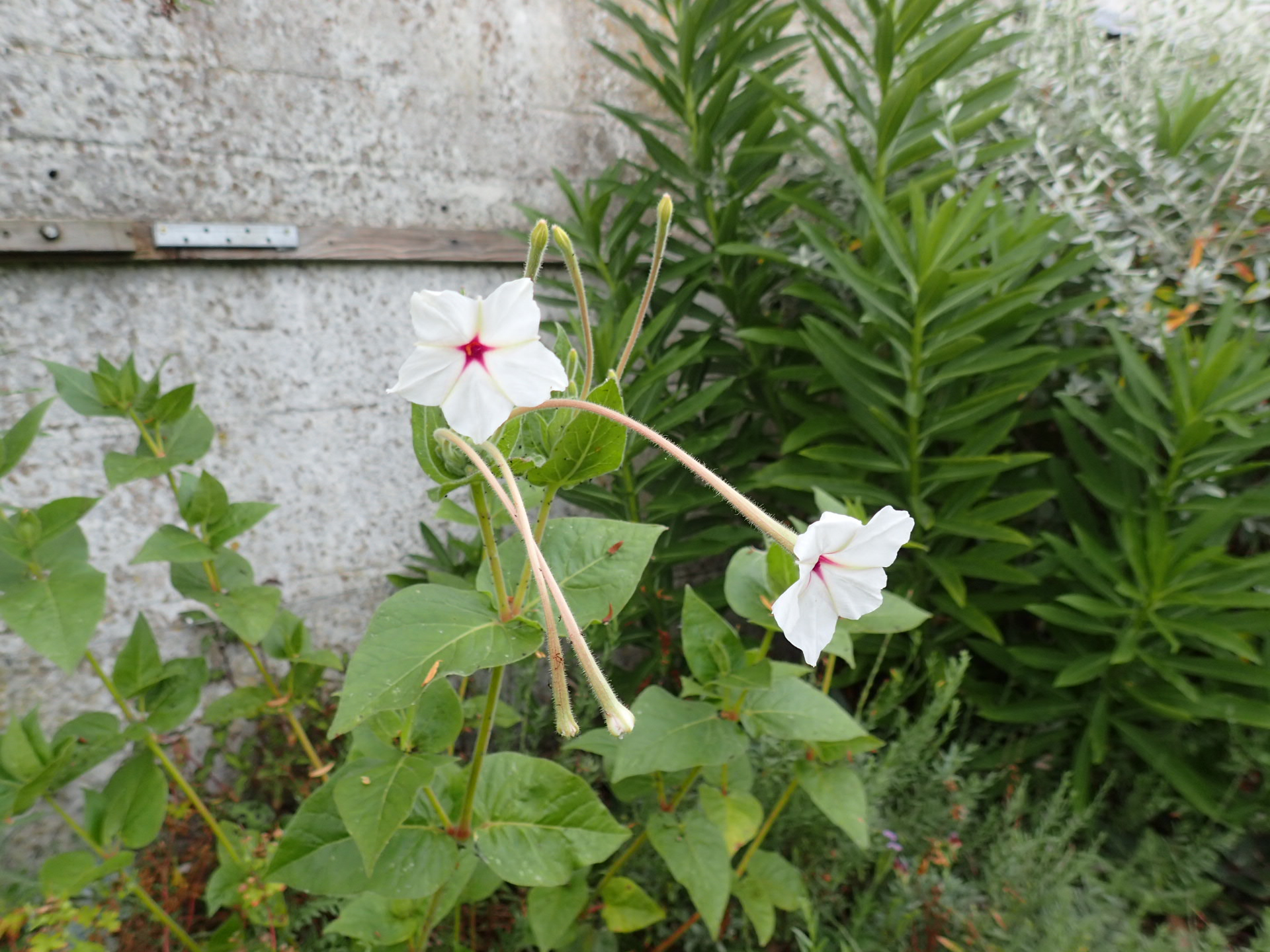
Flowers

It is a herbaceous, tender perennial species that grows up to 150 cm high (5 feet). It has upright, thin stems that branch densely from the base. Petiolate leaves between 6 and 11.5 cm long and 3 to 7 cm wide in ovate or lanceo-ovate shape, bright green in color.

=== Inflorescences ===
The inflorescences are terminal or axillary, very compact, with linear and foliar bracts. The involvements are bell-shaped, 1 to 1.5 cm long, with unequal triangular or slightly lanceolate lobes. The flower has a perianth 8 to 17 cm long, 5 stamens, brush-shaped stigma. The fruit is an elliptical or oblong dark-colored achene about 8 mm long by 5 mm wide.

Flower colour is white to pinkish with a reddish or purplish throat. This species is a nocturnal flowerer, whose long, narrow, strongly-scented, tubular flowers (approaching 17 centimeters in maximum length) exhale a fragrant aroma at nights.

== Distribution and habitat ==
Native to southwestern United States, from Arizona to Texas and northern Mexico, it is found in scrubby canyons and riverbanks.

== Gallery ==
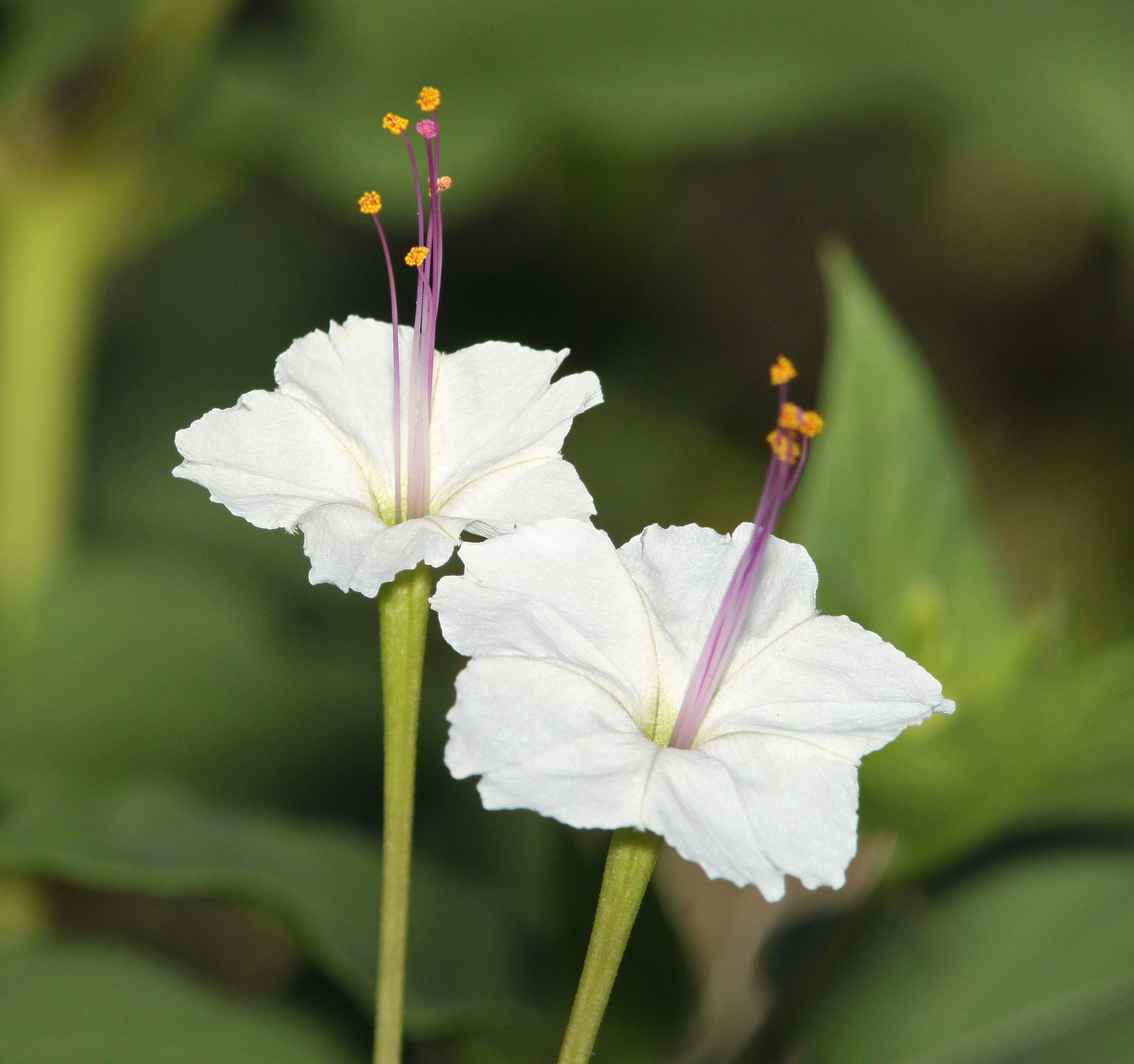
Flower detail

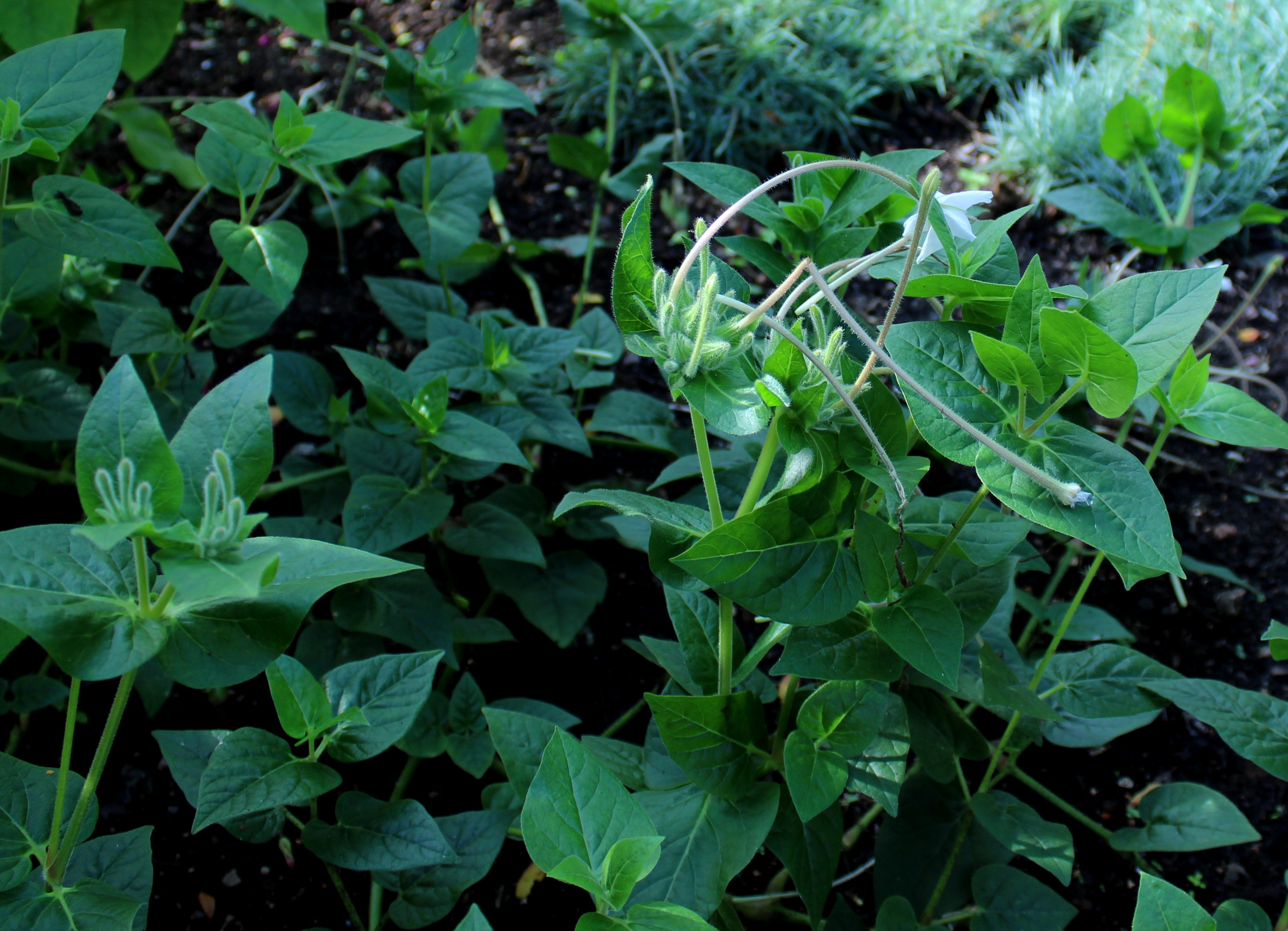
Grown in clumps at the University of Latvia Botanical Garden

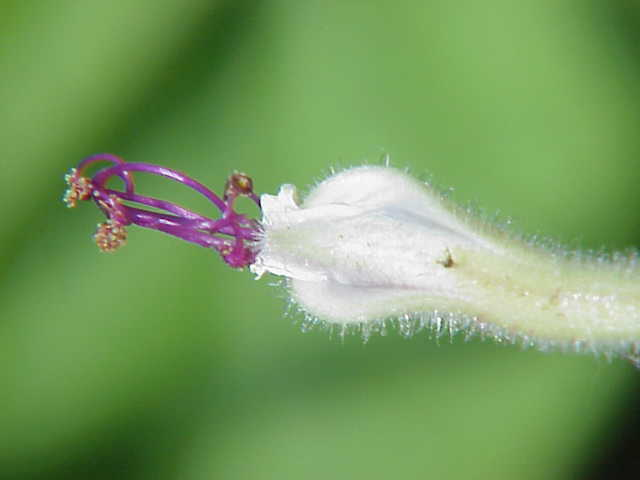
Emerging flower

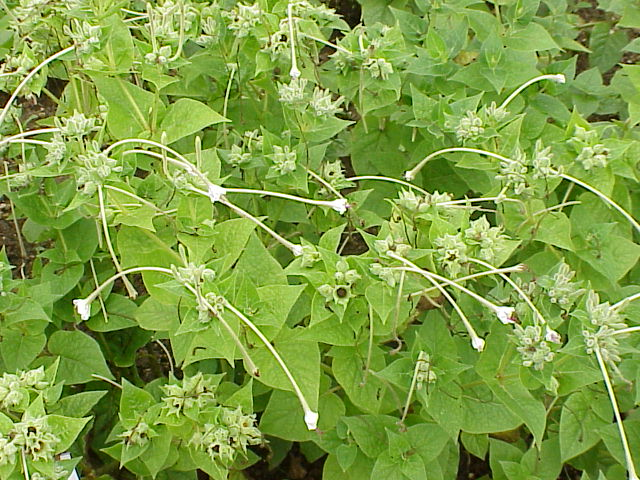
Long tubular flowers

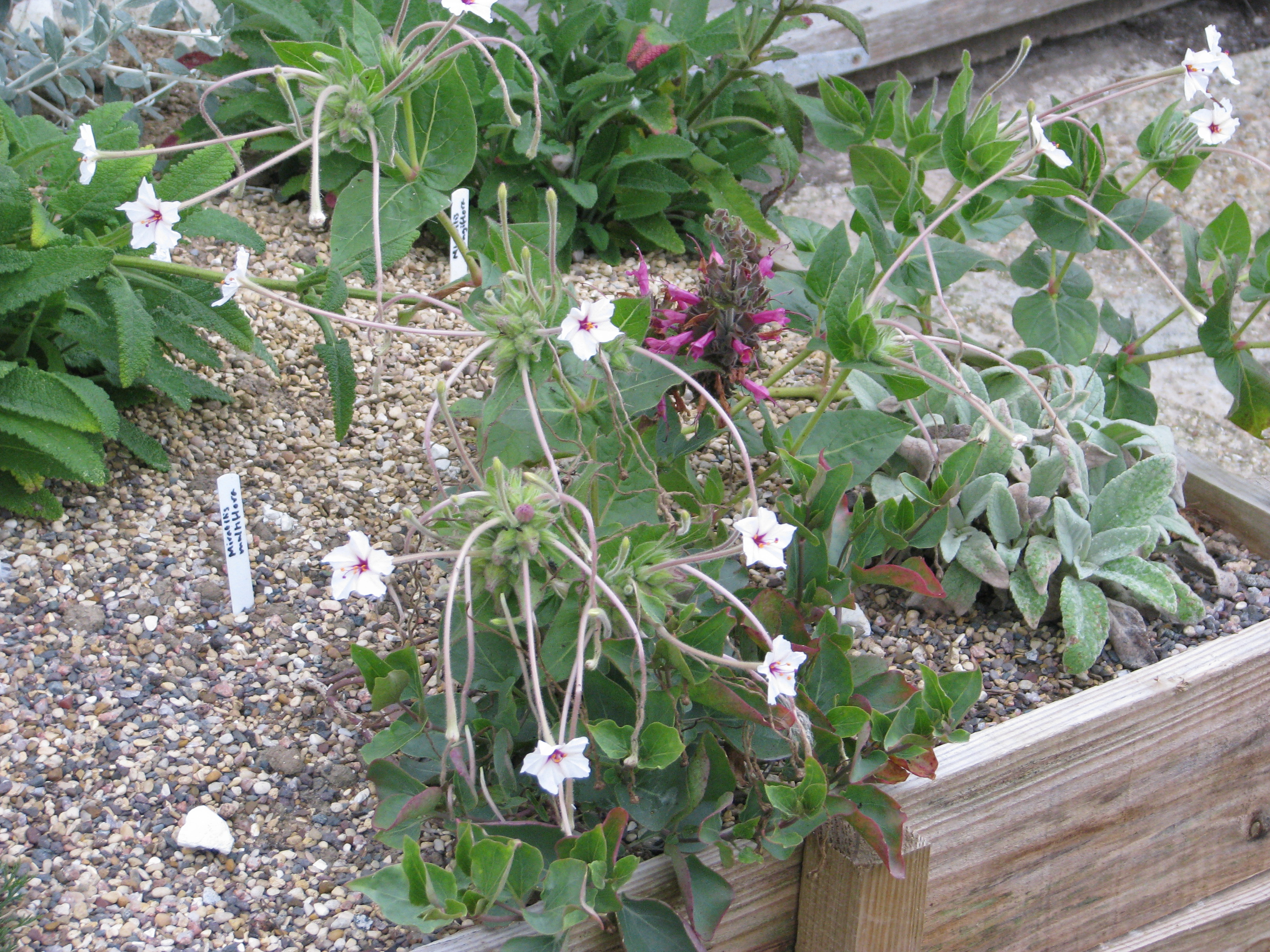
As a rock garden plant on raised a garden bed
