= Mirabilis expansa =

Scientific classification
- Kingdom: Plantae
- Clade: Embryophytes
- Clade: Tracheophytes
- Clade: Spermatophytes
- Clade: Angiosperms
- Clade: Eudicots
- Order: Caryophyllales
- Family: Nyctaginaceae
- Genus: Mirabilis
- Species: M. expansa

Binomial name
- Mirabilis expansa (Ruiz & Pav.) Standl.

Synonyms
- Allionia expansa (Ruiz & Pav.) Kuntze; Calymenia expansa (Ruiz & Pav.) Pers.; Calyxhymenia expansa Ruiz & Pav.; Oxybaphus expansus (Ruiz & Pav.) Vahl

Species of plant

Mirabilis expansa (mauka or chago) is a species of flowering plant in the four o'clock family, Nyctaginaceae. Its roots can reach the size of a man's forearm and the plant can grow 1 metre (3 1/2 feet) tall. It is cultivated as a root vegetable in the Andes, at cold, windy altitudes, but has otherwise received little commercial interest.

== Description ==
Mirabilis expansa is in the Nyctaginaceae family. The mature storage roots can reach the length and diameter of a human forearm. The stems underground are a salmon-pink colour and are smooth and fleshy. They are up to 50 centimetres (20 inches) long and 5 cm (2 in) wide. It is a known perennial plant because of the edible part of the collar swells. It can grow up to 1 metre (3 1/2 feet) tall and is relatively disease resistant. The stems are cylindrical separated by nodes, from which pairs of leaves arise.

The inflorescences are on long slender branches that range from three to six centimeters in length. These branches are covered with hairs that are constantly trapping small insects. Flower colour is different depending on the geographical location. In Bolivia, the flowers are purple, and in Ecuador, they are purple and white.

== Distribution and habitat ==
Mirabilis expansa was a very important crop to the Inca Empire and was considered lost. The modern cultivation of mauka was first described in a rural community in Bolivia in the 1960s. Fifteen years later it was found in Ecuador and Peru and has seen the largest area of production in those countries. It has been proposed that the reason mauka has survived in three separate locations is because the Incas had a policy of transplanting valuable crops to communities throughout the empire.

It is cultivated as a root vegetable in the Andes, considered one of the most important regions for crop development and diversification. It thrives at cold, windy altitudes between 2,200 m (7,200 ft) and 3,500 m (11,500 ft). Otherwise, it is only grown in small vegetable gardens. The above-ground portion dies back with frost, but the root is quite hardy.

== Cultivation ==
Mauka can reproduce with seeds or can propagate vegetatively using basal shoots, pieces of stem or suckers. Vegetative propagation is the technique that is used most often. If a plant is reproduces using a basal shoot it can usually be harvested after one year. If a sucker is used then it may be a longer period of time before the plant can be harvested. Mauka is planted into holes in long narrow grooves that are one meter by one meter and must be earthed carefully. In Ecuador, farmers intercrop mauka with maize to optimize soil structure for root development.

Mauka can grow with a minimum of 500 mm (20 in) of rainfall, optimally with an annual rainfall between 600–800 mm (24–31 in). The absolute minimum pH level that mauka can survive with is 5.5, but the optimal level is between 6 and 7. Mauka is usually harvested annually but can be left in the ground for long periods of time. After two years of growth yields increase substantially. Yields can reach 50,000 kg/ha (45,000 lb/acre) given two years maturation time.

=== Stress tolerance ===
Mauka is a stress-tolerant crop, growing at cold, windy altitudes over 2,700 m (8,900 ft). It is able to survive in places of constant winds and near-constant chill, two factors that place heavy physical strain and stress on the crop. Its hardiness is an advantage for poor farmers.

=== Intercropping ===
Intercropping with maize is a very useful solution for preventing attacks from slugs and certain types of insects that dig into the plant's underground root. Intercropping provides a much stronger soil structure that will help the root develop. Intercropping increases predator biodiversity, which in turn helps limit pest outbreaks. An advantage of this pest solution is that many farmers already grow maize; however, a disadvantage of this solution is that some poor farmers cannot afford to intercrop.

=== Potential wider adoption ===
Potential advantages of Mauka for poor farmers are that it is very inexpensive to reproduce because it can be done by vegetative propagation and once it is planted it requires very little labour. A potential disadvantage is its long growing period. Poor farmers may not be able to wait two years for it to reach its optimal yields.

Mauka's main constraint is that it was forgotten for so many years. It was only recently rediscovered, meaning that there is only limited information available about it. This is a disadvantage to poor people because many communities do not know the potential it has so they do not grow it. One potential advantage is that the communities who do harvest mauka have been able to make sure it has survived over the years.

As it was forgotten for many years, its profile needs to heighten to make it more profitable. Value can be added by selling it in soups and chilies that are already made. There is not enough information to determine if it is considered a "poor man's crop". It is also not popular enough to know if it is appropriate for an urban environment. Mauka has been reported to be a relatively low labour crop but the amount of child and female labour is unknown.

== Uses ==
Mirabilis expansa yields a large amount of edible stems and storage roots. The roots of some forms if eaten directly can irritate the mucous membranes, and should be sun-dried and boiled before eating to eliminate the irritating substance. Once the root has been exposed to the sun, the astringent, bitter taste is replaced with sweetness. Bolivian forms are more often irritating than Ecuadorian forms.

The leaves are also edible, and can be used in salad and chili sauces. The roots can be prepared in the same way as sweet potato or cassava, two similar crops, and can be an ingredient in soups and stews. In one of the traditional preparations the boiled roots are mixed with honey and toasted grain. In Ecuador they prepare mauka in two ways: savory and sweet. To prepare mauka as sweet, the plant is buried for one week in the soil with layers of barley straw alternated between it to concentrate the sugars. The cooking water of M. expansa makes a satisfying sweet drink. According to one source, "In Bolivia, the stems and roots are left to ripen and then cut and cooked. The cooking water is served as a soft drink".

M. expansa can be used to feed livestock, allowing the entire plant to be used. Mauka's many different uses give it a higher degree of conversion than other agricultural by-products.

=== Nutrition ===
Mauka roots contain approximately 87% carbohydrate on a dry weight basis. Mauka analyzed from Bolivia and Peru has a 7% and 5% protein content. The underground parts of the plant contain 2760 mg of calcium and 590 mg of phosphorus, and the foliage contains 17% protein. Sodium and iron levels are low in mauka but the protein, calcium, and phosphorus content are higher than other roots and tubers grown in the same agro-ecological area. These high levels are an advantage for the poor people consuming the crop because they help to give mauka a high nutritional value. If the root is not left to ripen, there are astringent components that may affect a person's tongue and lips.

== Regional names ==
In Bolivia, mauka's common name is Spanish mauka. In Peru it has many different common names, such as chago, arricon, yuca, inca, cuship, and chaco. In Ecuador it is known as miso, taso, or pega pega.

== Sources ==
- Davidson, Alan. Oxford Companion to Food (1999). "Mauka", pp. 484–485 ISBN 0-19-211579-0
