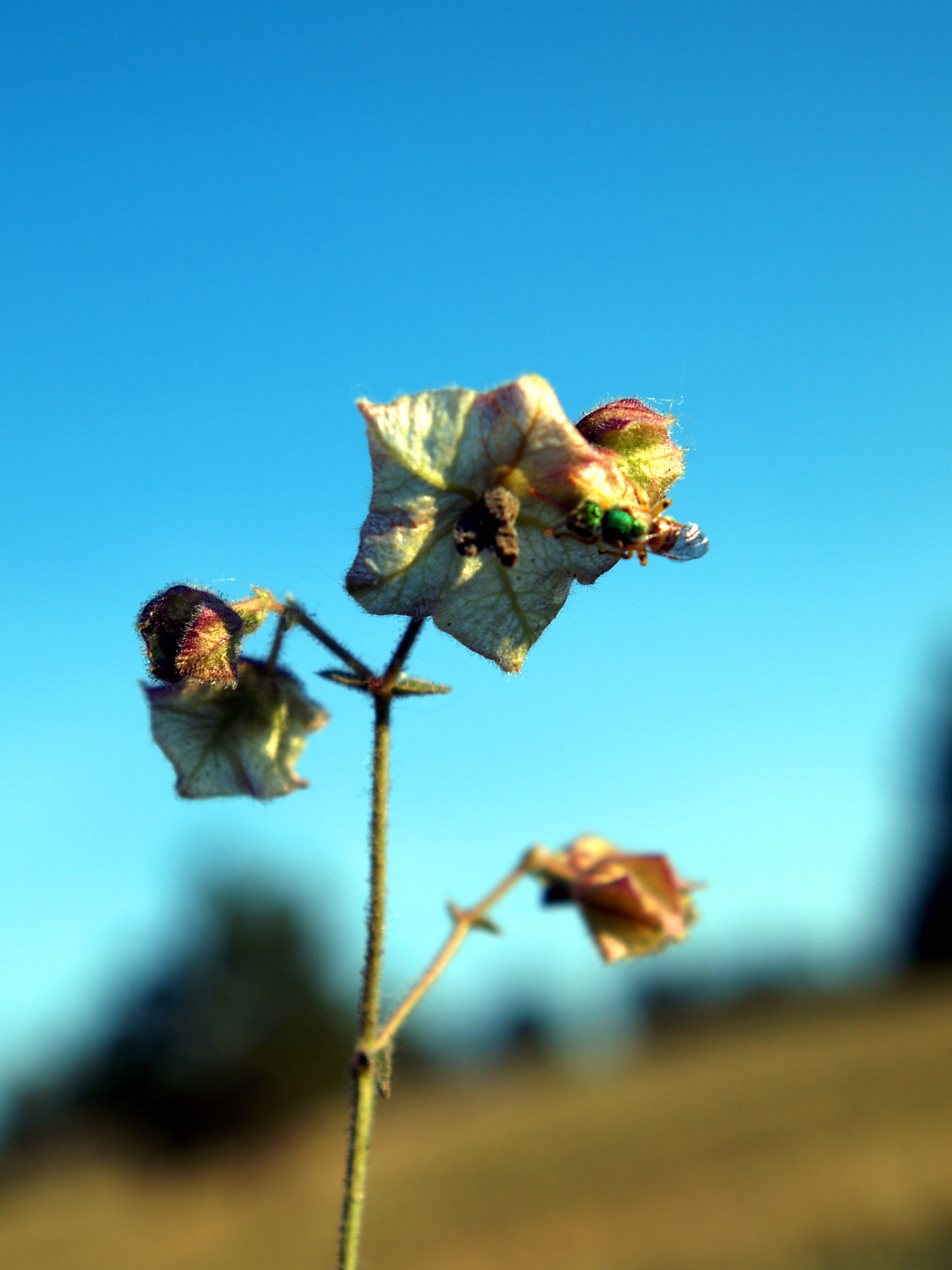

Conservation status
- Secure (NatureServe)

Scientific classification
- Kingdom: Plantae
- Clade: Tracheophytes
- Clade: Angiosperms
- Clade: Eudicots
- Order: Caryophyllales
- Family: Nyctaginaceae
- Genus: Mirabilis
- Species: M. linearis

Binomial name
- Mirabilis linearis (Pursh) Heimerl

Varieties
- M. l. var. decipiens; M. l. var. linearis; M. l. var. subhispida

Synonyms
- List: Allionia linearis Pursh; Calymenia linearis (Pursh) Nutt.; Mirabilis hirsuta var. linearis (Pursh) B.Boivin; Oxybaphus angustifolius var. linearis (Pursh) Choisy; Oxybaphus linearis (Pursh) B.L.Rob.

= Mirabilis linearis =

Plant species in the four o'clock family

Mirabilis linearis, commonly known as narrowleaf four o'clock, is a species of plant. Among the Zuni people, the root is eaten to induce urination and vomiting. They also take an infusion of the root for stomachache.
