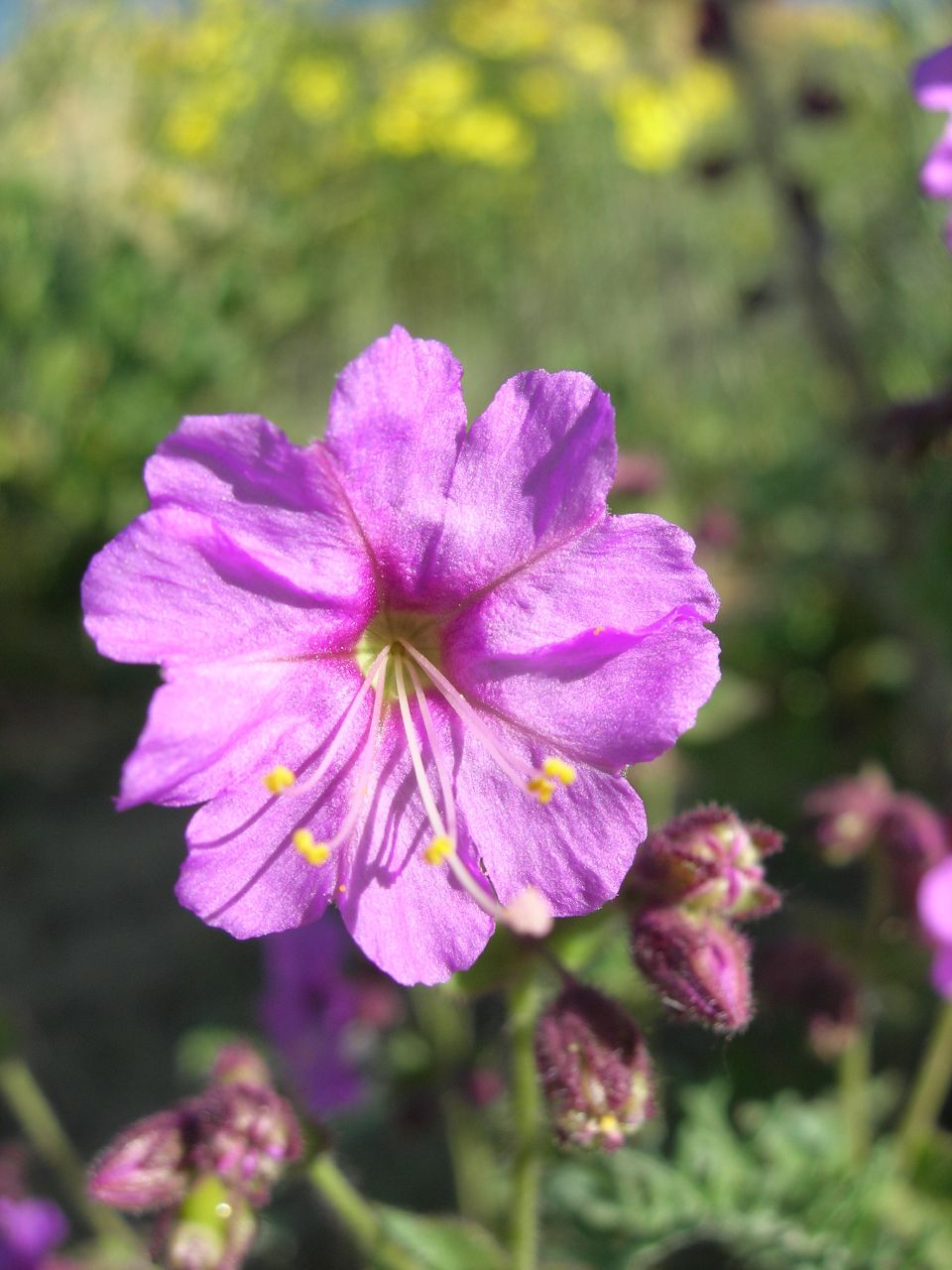
- Mirabilis laevis var. crassifolia

Scientific classification
- Kingdom: Plantae
- Clade: Tracheophytes
- Clade: Angiosperms
- Clade: Eudicots
- Order: Caryophyllales
- Family: Nyctaginaceae
- Genus: Mirabilis
- Species: M. laevis

Binomial name
- Mirabilis laevis (Benth.) Curran

= Mirabilis laevis =

Species of flowering plant

Mirabilis laevis, the desert wishbone-bush, is a recently redefined species of flowering plant in the four o'clock family. Distribution is in the Southwestern United States and northwest Mexico.

== Distribution ==
Mirabilis laevis now includes the common California chaparral plant known as wishbone bush (formerly Mirabilis californica), and several very similar relatives previously classified as separate species and now as varieties.

== Varieties ==
- Mirabilis laevis var. crassifolia is found in California chaparral and woodlands habitats in California and Baja California, including Cedros Island (namesake for synonym M. c. (A. Gray) var. cedrosensis (Standl.) J.F. Macbr.). The plant is also found in the Southern California Coast Ranges, Sierra Nevada foothills, Transverse Ranges, Peninsular Ranges, the White Mountains, and the Inyo Mountains.
- Mirabilis laevis var. retrorsa is found in the White and Inyo Mountains, Nevada, and Oregon, east to Utah, and south to Arizona and northwest Mexico.
- Mirabilis laevis var. villosa has a similar distribution to Mirabilis laevis var. retrorsa.

== Gallery ==
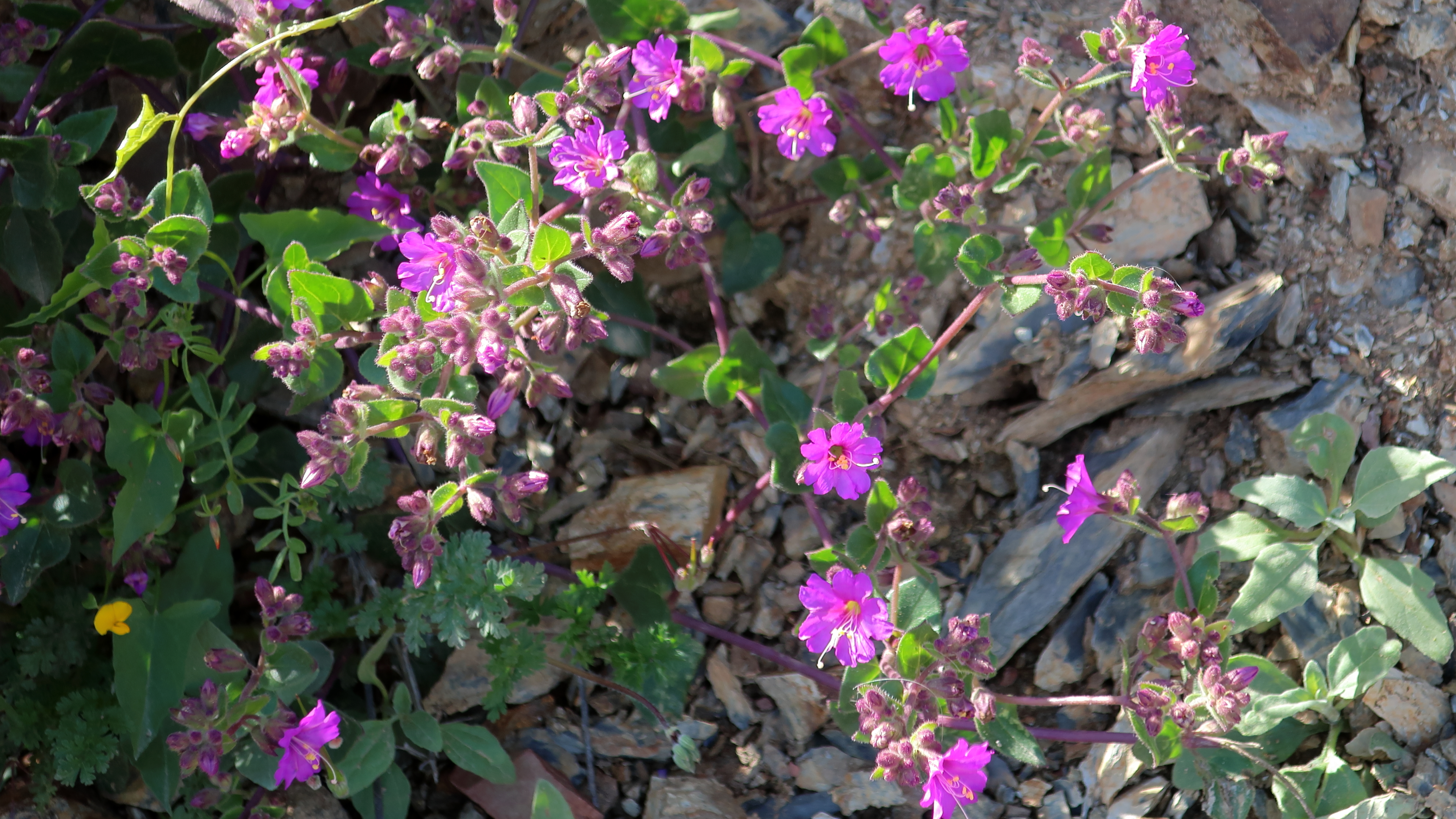

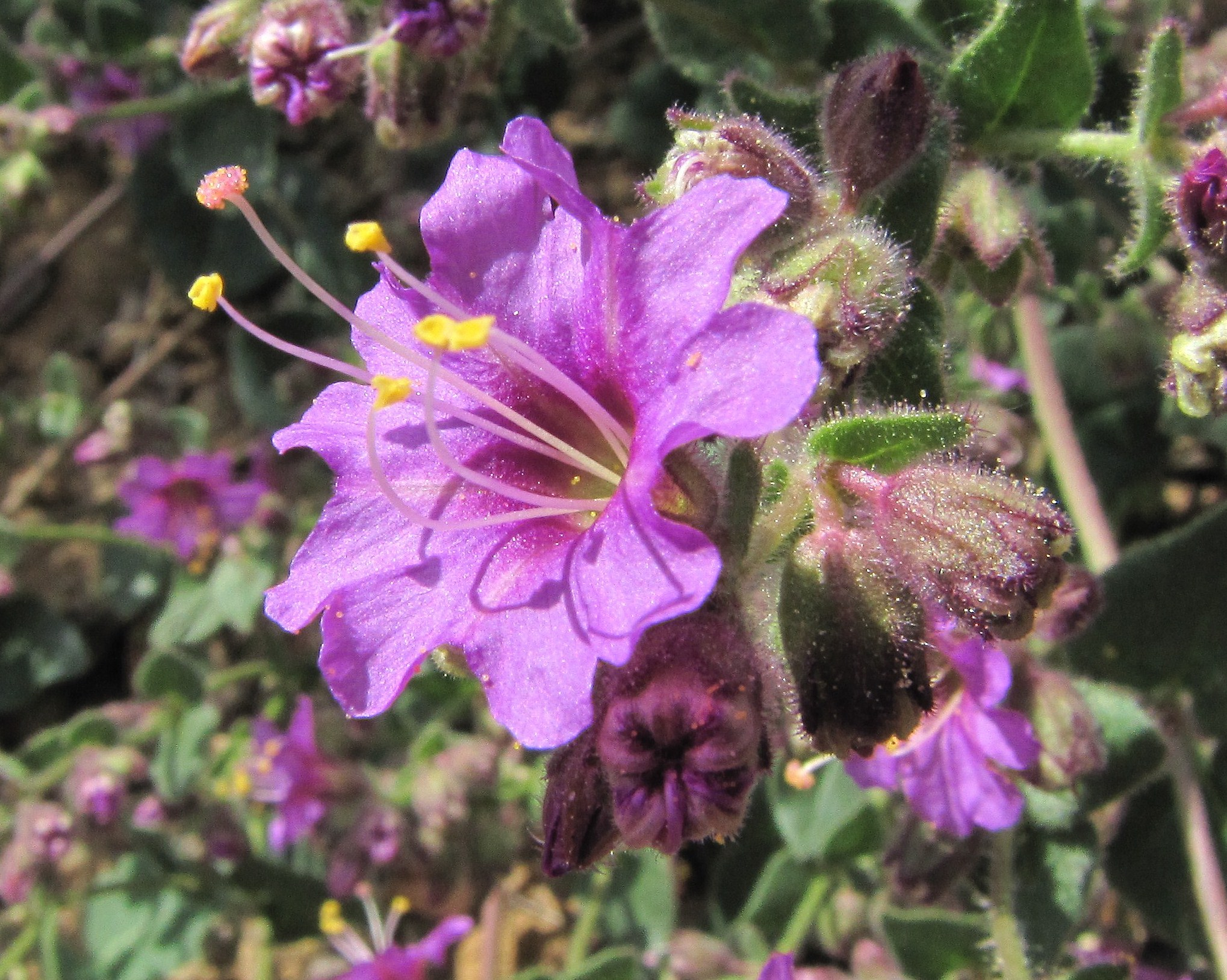

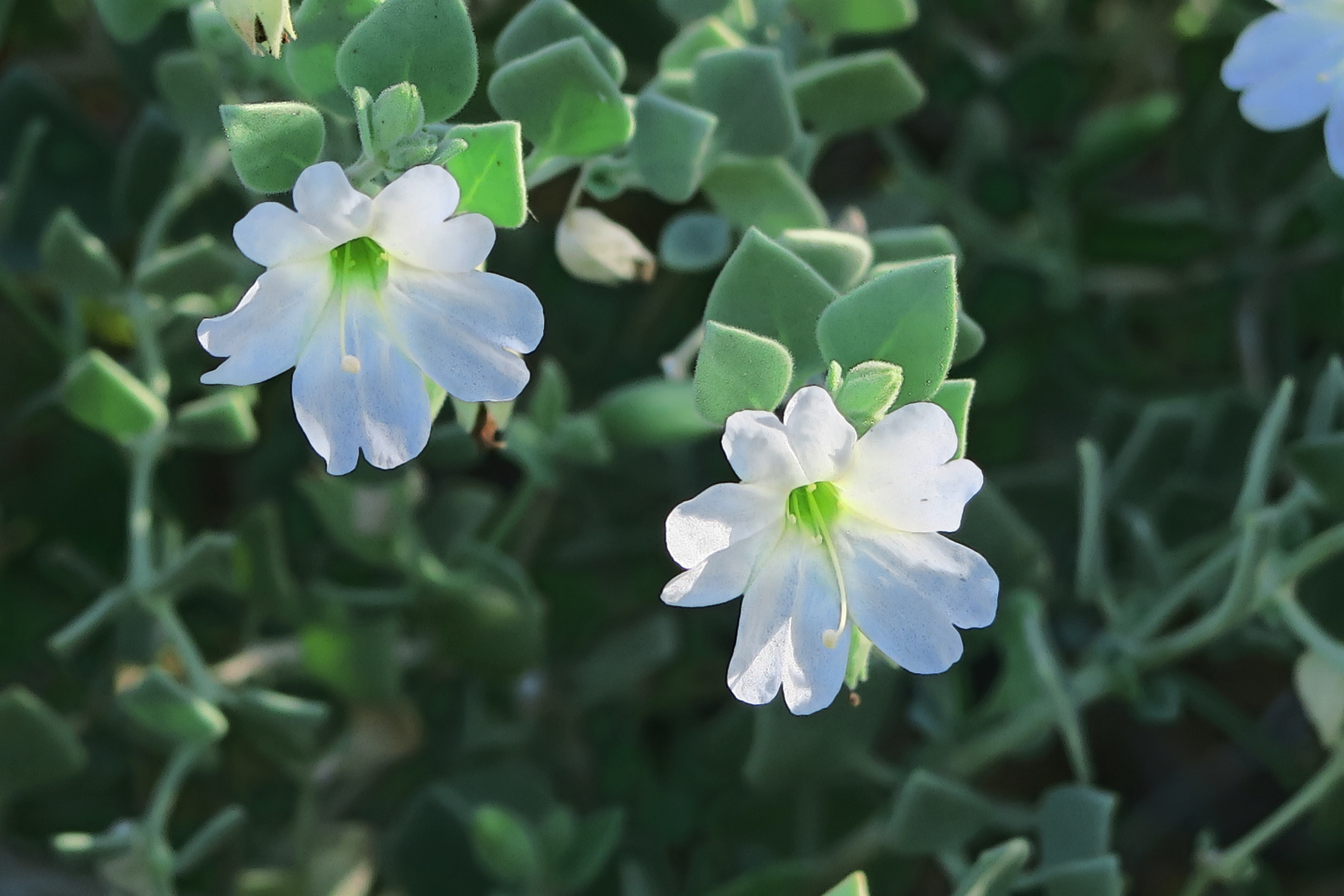
Mirabilis laevis var. villosa

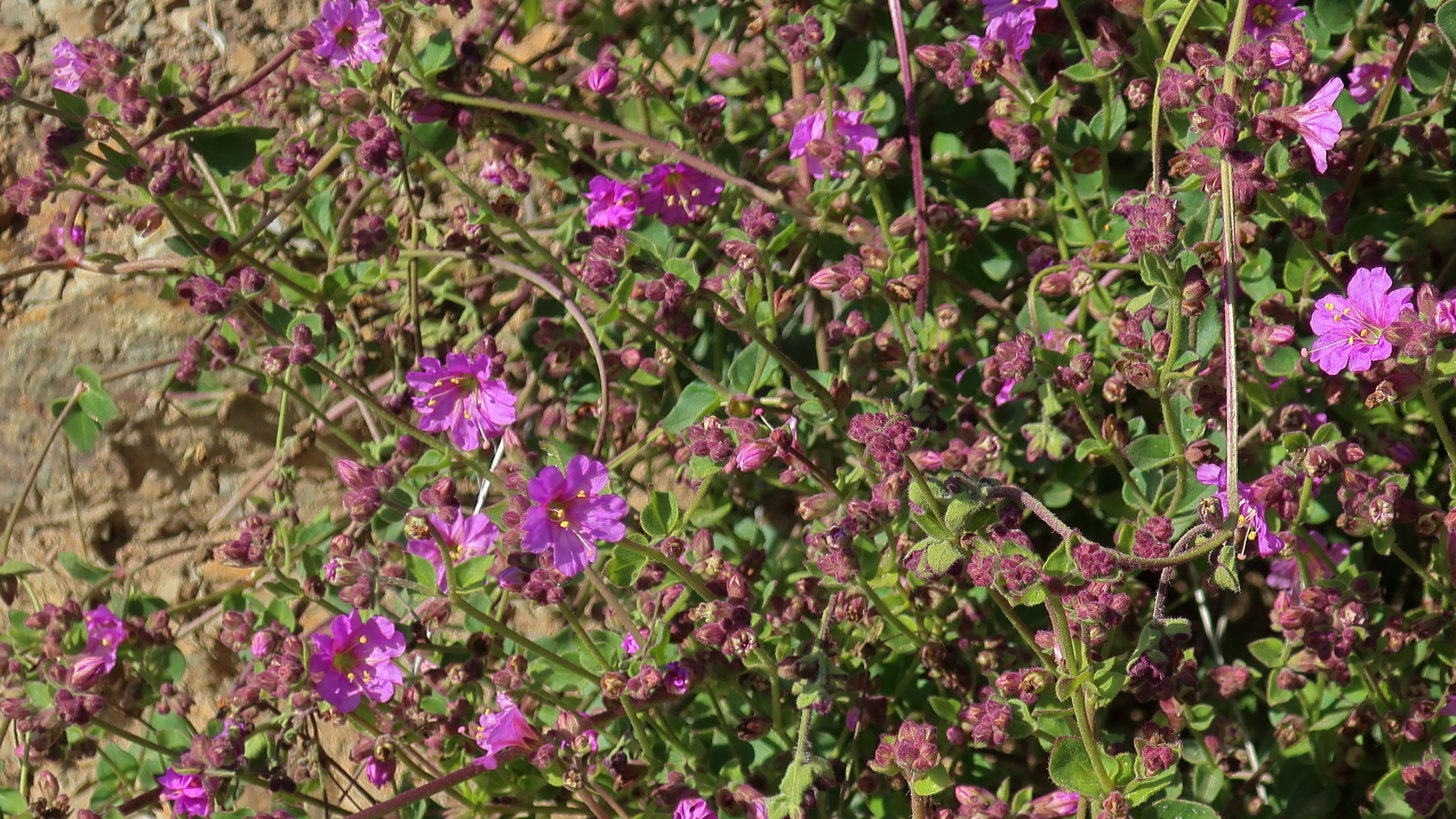
