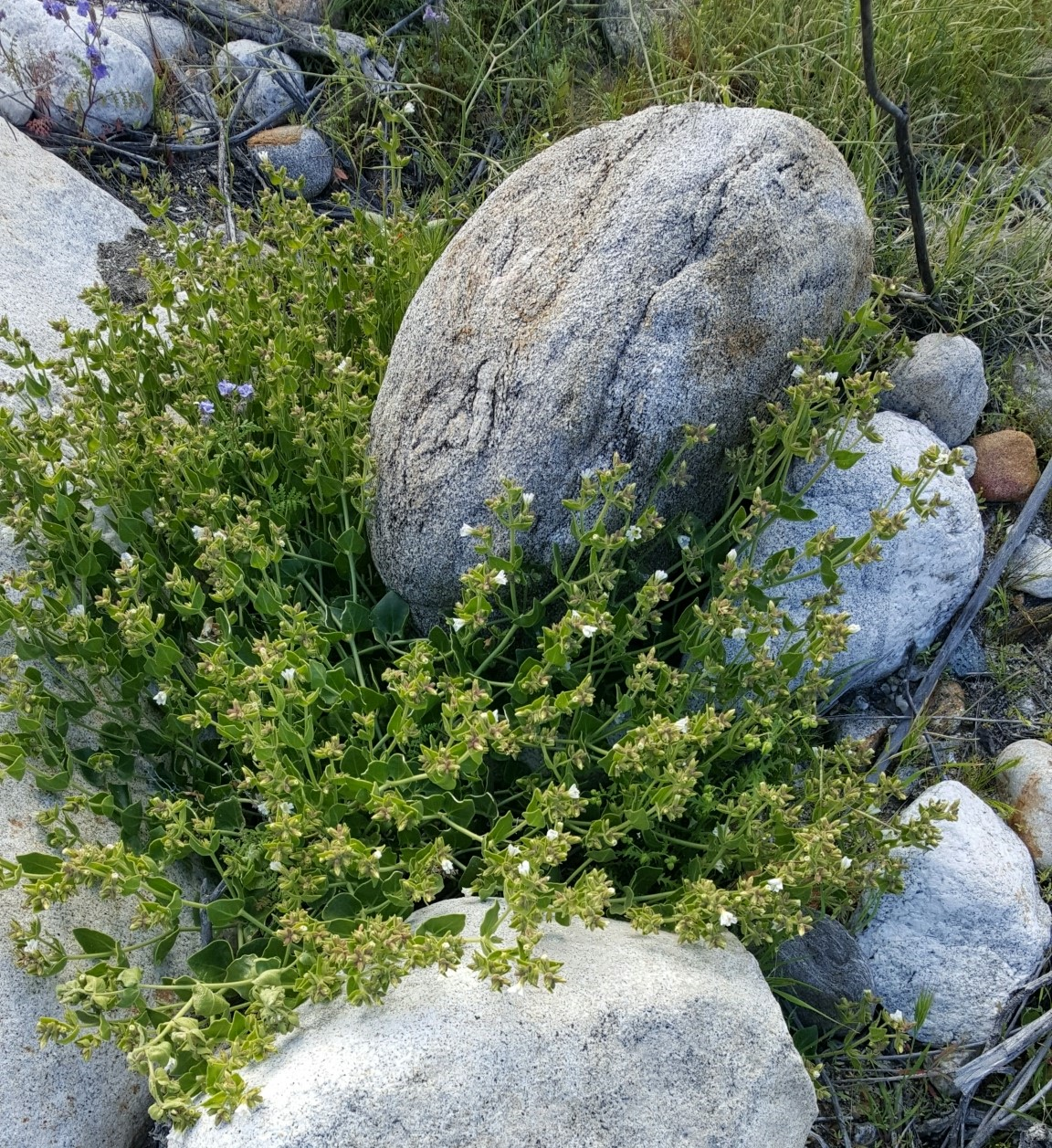

Scientific classification
- Kingdom: Plantae
- Clade: Tracheophytes
- Clade: Angiosperms
- Clade: Eudicots
- Order: Caryophyllales
- Family: Nyctaginaceae
- Genus: Mirabilis
- Species: M. tenuiloba

Binomial name
- Mirabilis tenuiloba S. Wats.

Synonyms
- Hesperonia tenuiloba (S. Watson) Standl.

= Mirabilis tenuiloba =

Species of flowering plant

Mirabilis tenuiloba common names longlobe four o'clock or maravilla, is a plant species native to the south-western United States and north-eastern Mexico. It has been reported from Baja California, Baja California Sur, southern California (Riverside, San Bernardino, San Diego and Imperial Counties) and Arizona (Pima and Yuma Counties).

Mirabilis tenuiloba is a perennial herb up to 100 cm tall, usually with many glandular hairs. Leaves are broadly egg-shaped, up to 8 cm long and 12 cm across. Flowers are trumpet-shaped or bell-shaped, white or pale pink, up to 18 mm long. Fruits are egg-shaped, dark red-brown, up to 6 mm long.
