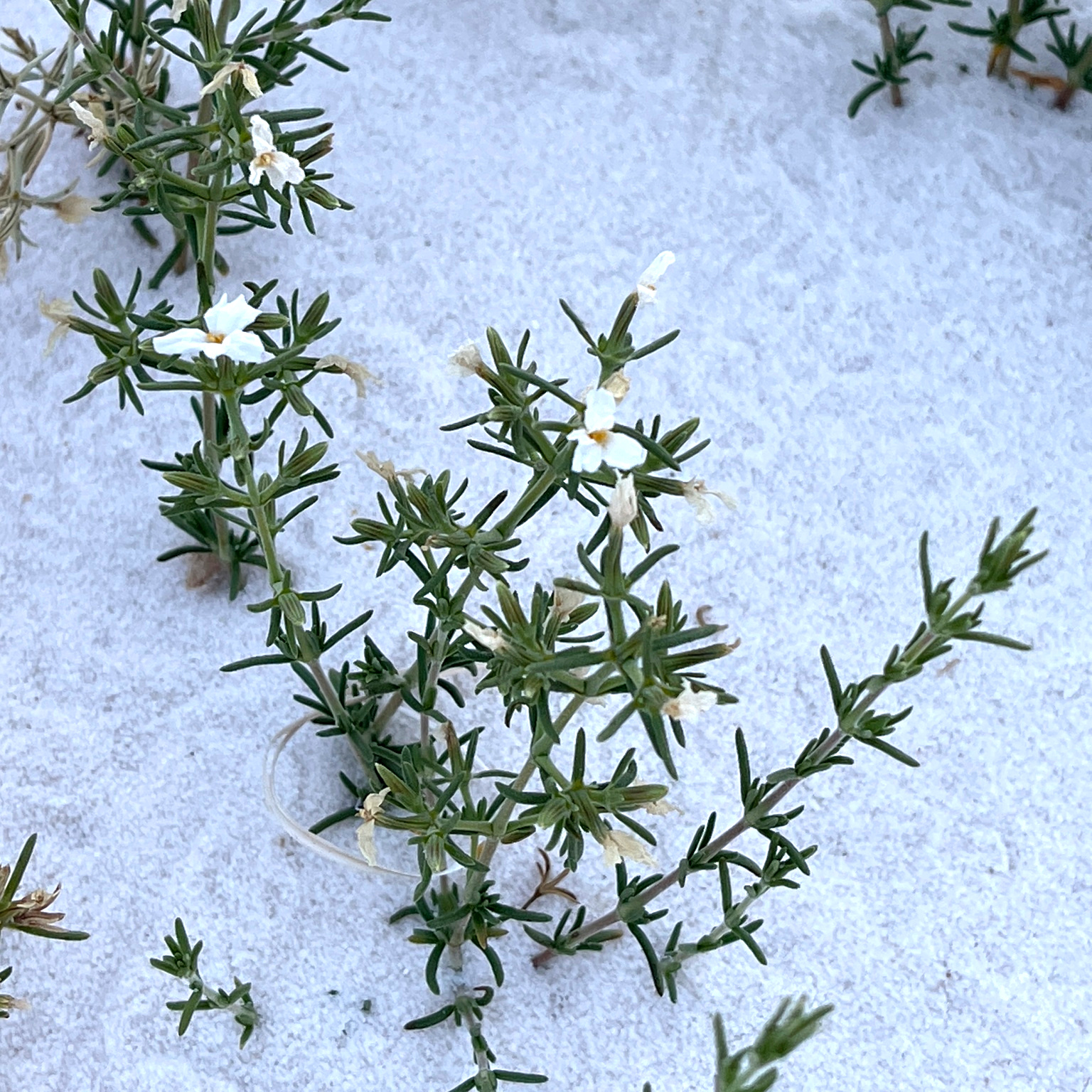
- Frankenia jamesii growing from gypsum in White Sands National Park, New Mexico

Conservation status
- Apparently Secure (NatureServe)

Scientific classification
- Kingdom: Plantae
- Clade: Tracheophytes
- Clade: Angiosperms
- Clade: Eudicots
- Order: Caryophyllales
- Family: Frankeniaceae
- Genus: Frankenia
- Species: F. jamesii

Binomial name
- Frankenia jamesii Torr. ex A.Gray

= Frankenia jamesii =

North American species of sea heath

Frankenia jamesii, known by the common names of pearly mockheather and James's sea heath, is a low growing shrub from the south-central United states from southern Colorado to the far western end of Texas. It has small leaves that are reminiscent of needle like leaves of common heather, suggesting one of its common names. It is a member of the Frankenia genus, which is the only genus in the family of flowering plants. It is best known for growing on gypsum soils.

== Description ==
Frankenia jamesii is a short, rounded shrub, 15–50 centimeters in height. The stems are covered in hairs that are either backwards facing or stand-outwards from them. The stems are branched.

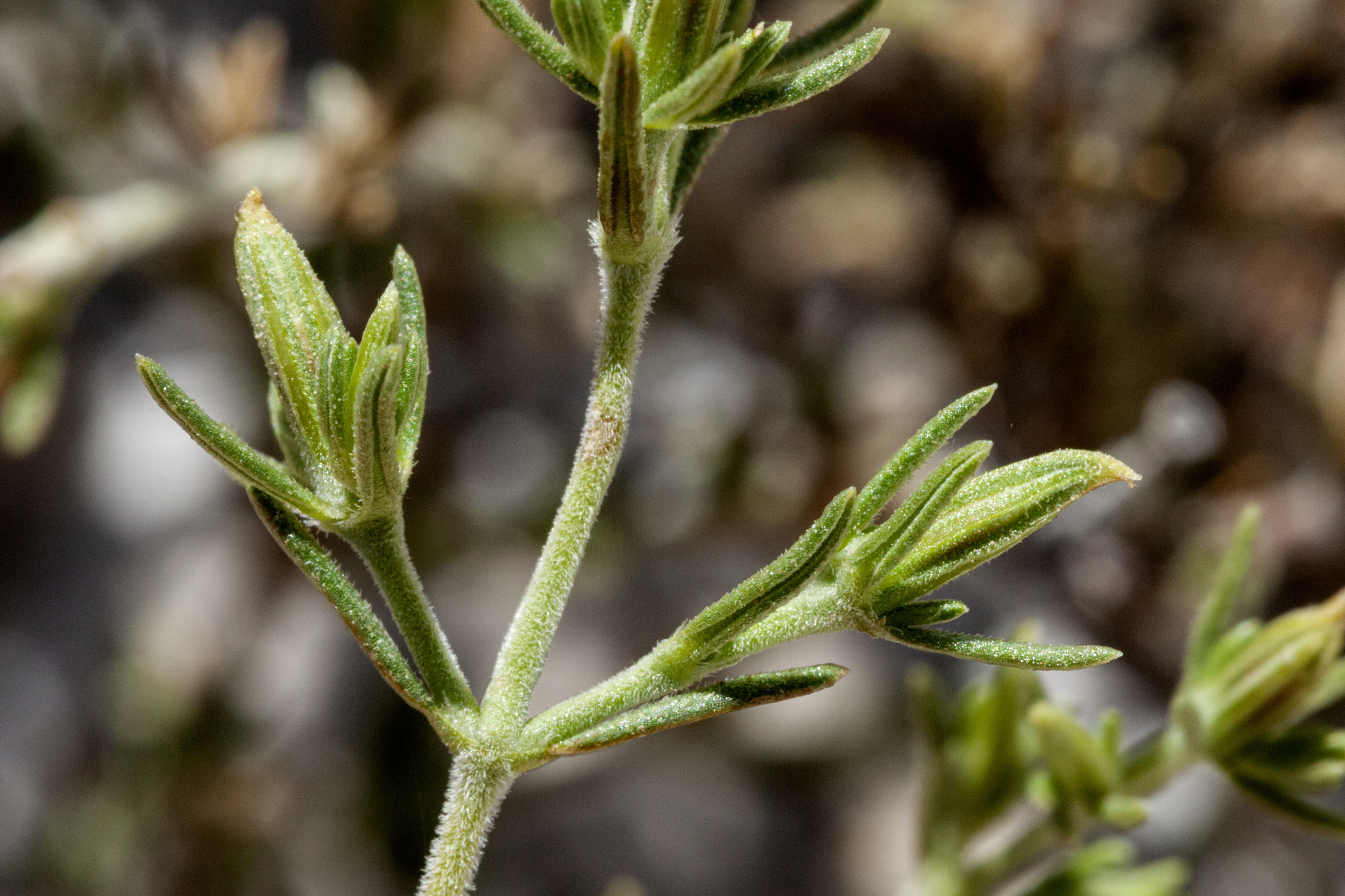
Frankenia jamesii leaves and stem

Its leaves are quite small and narrow, only 1.5–8.5 millimeters long and 0.5–1 millimeter wide. They are narrow, almost grass like (linear leaves) to having a slightly egg-like shape with the widest portion towards the base (narrow ovate leaves). Usually they are attached directly to the stem or only have a very short leaf stem (petiole) attaching it to the main stem. The leaves are yellow-green with a gray cast. The edges of the leaves are strongly rolled downward (revolute leaf). The lower surface of the leaves is almost entirely concealed by the tight roll of the leaves while the upper surface is either smooth in texture or only having a few scattered hairs. The leaves are in pairs on opposite sides of the stems.

=== Flowers ===
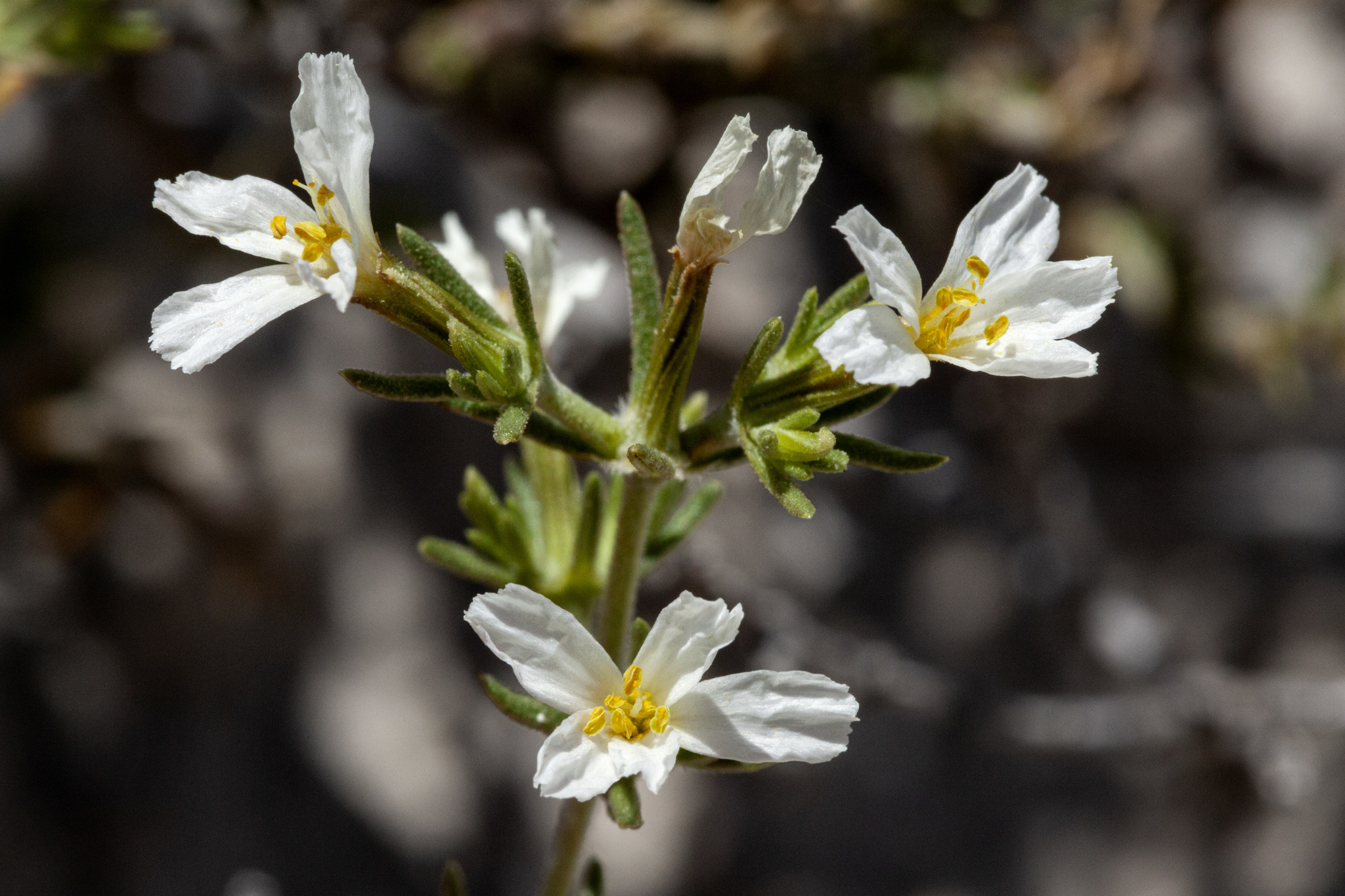
Frankenia jamesii flowers

The flowers are found in axils of leaf buds at the end of the stem branches and are attached directly to the main stem. The flower petals are white and broader near the tip than towards the base. Usually the flowers will have five petals, but will sometimes have four or six. Each petal is quite small, just 5–12 millimeters. Behind the petals the calyx (sepals) is 4.5–7.3 millimeters with a typical five lobes, though occasionally just four. Each flower will have a normal six stamens, though also as few as three or as many as eight, and they measure 5.3–8.5 millimeters.

The fruit is a capsule with one ivory to golden-brown seed. The seeds are largely egg shaped with a strong conic point and 2–3 millimeters in size.

== Taxonomy ==
Frankenia jamesii was scientifically described and named by the botanist Asa Gray using information from John Torrey in 1873. Gray said the specimens he examined to describe the species were collected from near Pueblo in the Colorado Territory by Edward Lee Greene. It had also been collected by Charles Wright in 1849 during an expedition to the Rio Grande Valley in Texas.

As of 2024 Plants of the World Online and World Flora Online list it as having no subspecies or synonyms.

=== Names ===
The genus name of this species is named for the botanist Johann Frankenius, a Swedish botanist who lived from 1590 to 1661. In Asa Gray's article on the species he credited John Torrey with giving the species its name, jamesii, for Edwin James who had collected specimens for Torrey. Frankenia jamesii is known by the common names "pearly mockheather" or "mockheather" because of some resemblance of the leaves and stems to the old world common heather. Its genus name, "Frankenia", is also sometimes used as a common name. Similarly it is also known as "James's sea heath", combining a common name for the genus with that of the species name.

== Range and habitat ==
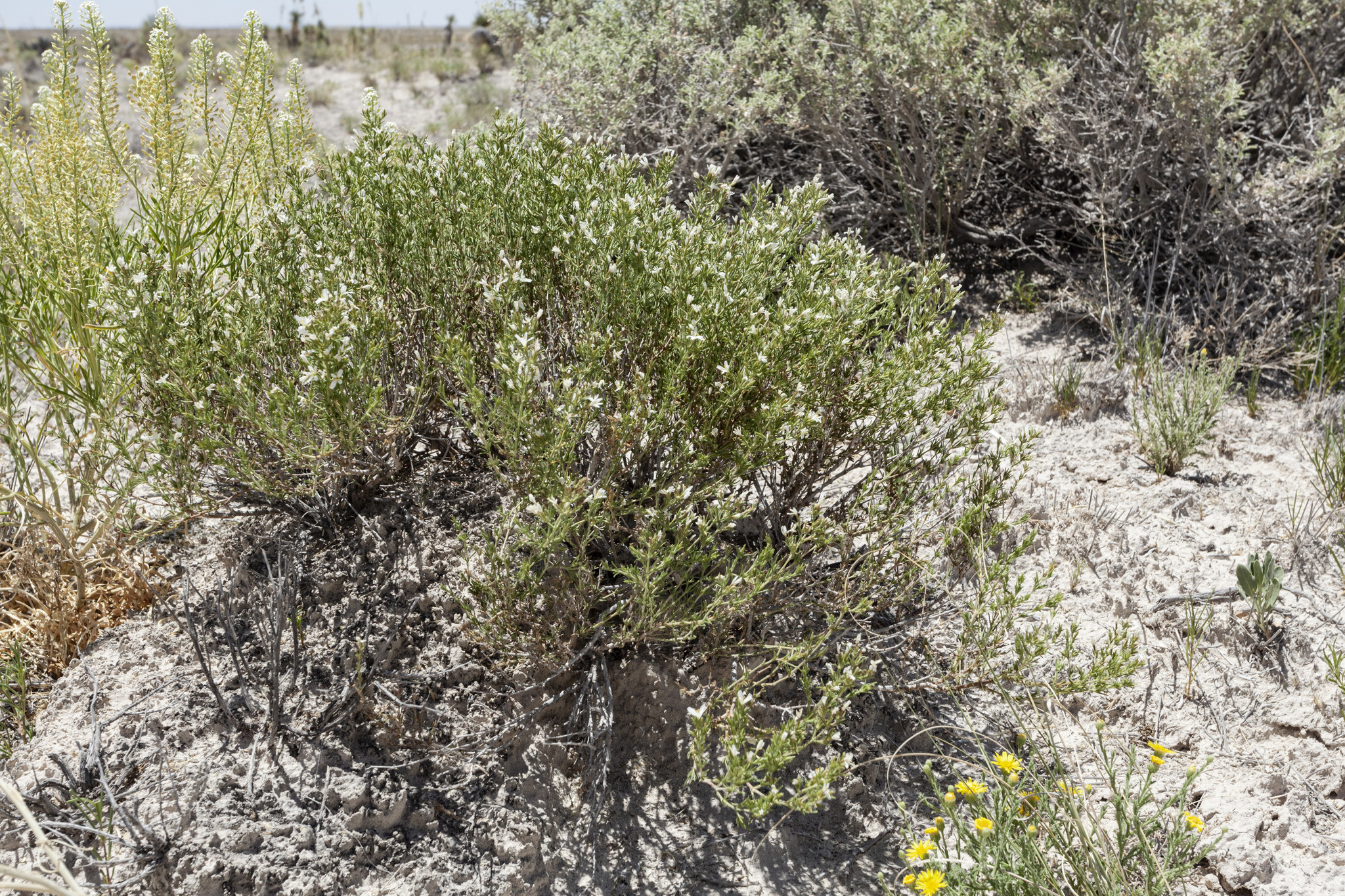
Frankenia jamesii flowering in Otero County, New Mexico

Pearly mockheather is only found in three western US states, Colorado, New Mexico, and Texas. Within those states it is found in the southern counties of Colorado, in four counties in central New Mexico, and just two counties in the far west of Texas near El Paso.

Mockheather is noted for growing in soils containing large amounts of gypsum and even in gypsum sands such as those found in White Sands National Park in New Mexico. Though it is not exclusively found on such soils. It is also found on sand dunes, sandy soils, silty soils, and alkaline shales. They are also a salt tolerant species of plant and a plant of secondary importance on salt or alkali flats. It is found at elevations from 1100 to 2000 meters.

=== Conservation ===
NatureServe evaluated Frankenia jamesii as apparently secure at a global level (G4) and in the state of New Mexico (S4) in 1989. They did not evaluate the populations of either Texas or Colorado. When the beetle Mediterranean tamarisk beetle (Diorhabda elongata) was released in North America to control invasive tamarisk trees there was fear that it would attack Frankenia species. Field research in 2003 found no damage to F. jamesii plants.

== Cultivation ==
Pearly mockheather is occasionally recommended as a drought hardy rock garden plant.
