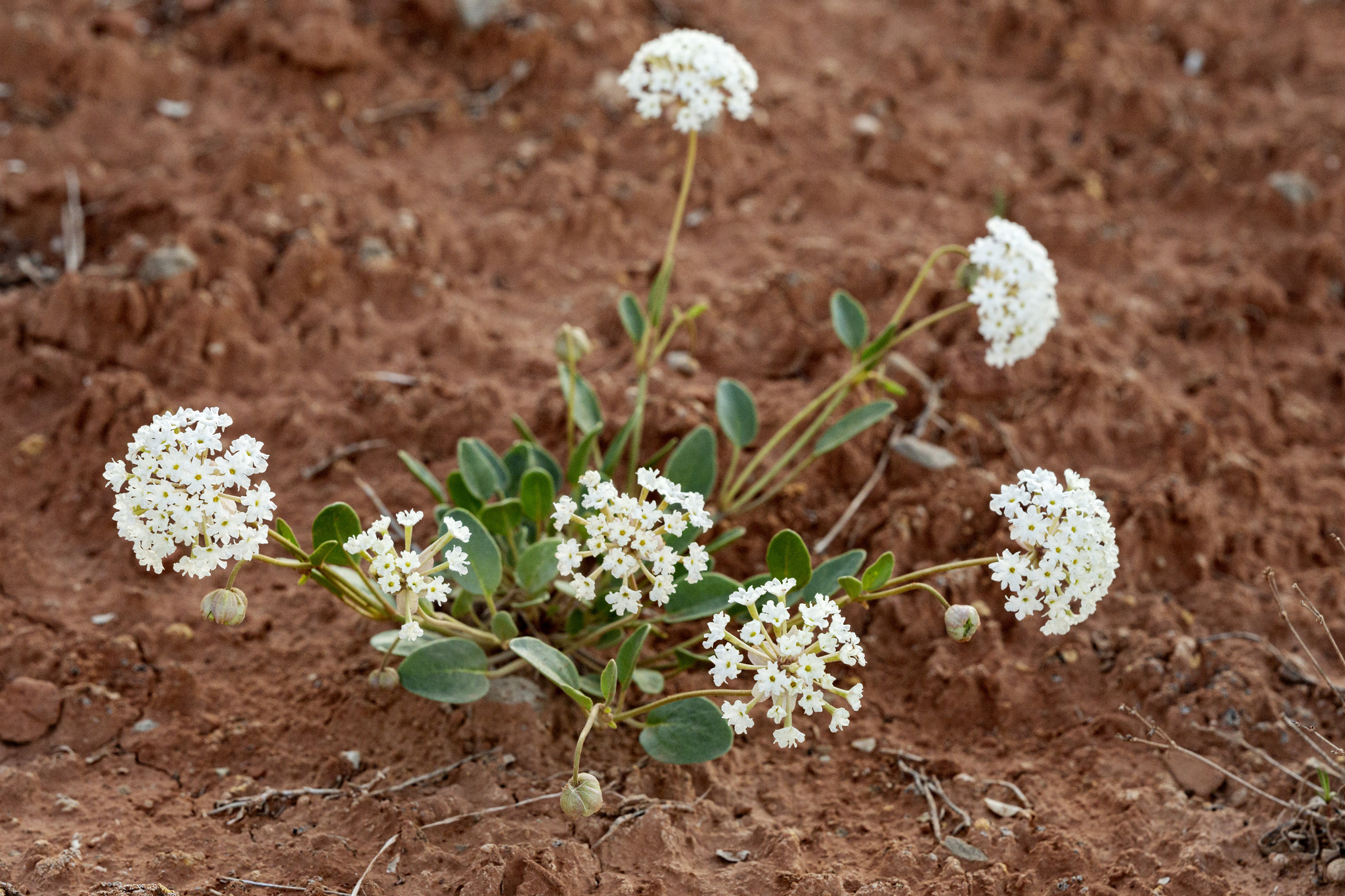
- Bighorn Basin, Wyoming

Conservation status
- Secure (NatureServe)

Scientific classification
- Kingdom: Plantae
- Clade: Embryophytes
- Clade: Tracheophytes
- Clade: Spermatophytes
- Clade: Angiosperms
- Clade: Eudicots
- Order: Caryophyllales
- Family: Nyctaginaceae
- Genus: Abronia
- Species: A. elliptica

Binomial name
- Abronia elliptica A.Nelson

Synonyms
- List: Abronia bakeri; Abronia bolackii; Abronia fallax; Abronia glabra; Abronia pumila; Abronia ramosa; Abronia salsa; Abronia sparsifolia

= Abronia elliptica =

Plant species in the four o'clock family

Abronia elliptica, the western sand-verbena or fragrant white sand-verbena, is a species in the four o'clock family native to the western United States.

== Description ==
Western sand-verbena is a perennial plant that grows from a deep, tough, woody taproot forming a low clump of green to blue-green stems and leaves. It occasionally has rhizomes and can form extensive patches of plants. It can occasionally be nearly stemless, but usually has stems either covered in glandular-hairs or infrequently hairless. Stems branch as they grow outwards along the ground and turn up at the ends, upwards at an angle, or straight up from the base of the plant to a length of 10 to 50 centimeters (4–20 in).

The leaves are more or less succulent and often have a very slightly wavy edge, but can also be smooth, sinuate, or undulate. They measure 1.5–6 centimeters (0.6–2.4 in) long and 0.5–3.5 cm wide with a short leaf stem of 1–4 cm (0.4–1.6 in). The upper surface is hairless to puberulent, covered in very thin and short hairs, while to lower surface is thinly puberulent to solidly hairy. The leaf shape is variable, narrow to broad lanceolate, lance-oblong, oblong, ovate, or lance-rhombic with a tip that can be narrow to rounded. They are attached to opposite sides of the stems or directly to the base of the plant.

The flower clusters are round and head-like with a series of broad oval bracts underneath it. They measure 0.5–2 cm long and 0.3–1 cm wide. The small, mostly white flowers are tubular with five lobes. Each cluster has 20 to 75 flowers, but usually not more than 70 or less than 25. The tube of each flower can be rose to somewhat green in color while the flower lobes are white, sometimes blushed with pink. The flowers close during the day to conserve moisture and are pleasantly fragrant when open.

== Taxonomy ==
Abronia elliptica was scientifically described and named in 1899 by Aven Nelson. It is part of the genus Abronia which is classified in the Nyctaginaceae family. The species is closely related to Abronia fragrans and is considered a species complex, a group . It has no subspecies and has 13 synonyms.

Table of Synonyms
Name	Year	Rank	Notes
Abronia bakeri Greene	1901	species	= het.
Abronia bolackii N.D.Atwood, S.L.Welsh & K.D.Heil	2002	species	= het.
Abronia fallax Heimerl ex Rydb.	1902	species	= het.
Abronia fragrans var. elliptica (A.Nelson) M.E.Jones	1903	variety	≡ hom.
Abronia fragrans f. elliptica (A.Nelson) Heimerl ex Rydb.	1902	form	≡ hom.
Abronia fragrans var. harrisii (S.L.Welsh) S.L.Welsh	2008	variety	= het., with incorrect basionym ref.
Abronia fragrans var. pterocarpa M.E.Jones	1903	variety	= het.
Abronia glabra Rydb.	1902	species	= het.
Abronia nana var. harrisii S.L.Welsh	1986	variety	= het.
Abronia pumila Rydb.	1902	species	= het.
Abronia ramosa Standl.	1909	species	= het.
Abronia salsa Rydb.	1902	species	= het.
Abronia sparsifolia Standl.	1909	species	= het.
Notes: ≡ homotypic synonym ; = heterotypic synonym

=== Names ===
The scientific name, elliptica, means 'elliptical' in Botanical Latin, referencing a common leaf shape for the species. It is known as western sand-verbena, fragrant white sand-verbena, and running sand verbena. It is also called dwarf sand-verbena, however Abronia nana is also known by this common name. Many species in the genus including Abronia elliptica, Abronia umbellata, and Abronia villosa, as well as the genus as a whole are known as just sand verbena.

== Range and habitat ==
Western sand-verbena is native to Wyoming, Colorado, New Mexico, Utah, Arizona, Montana, and Nevada. In Wyoming it grows mainly in south and west, but there is a population in Big Horn County in the north.In Colorado it is found only in the westernmost counties and it only grows in the northwest of New Mexico. It is native to many parts of Utah, but only northern Arizona. The species is also found throughout eastern Nevada. Its elevation range is from 700 to 2,500 meters (2,300–8,200 ft).

It often grows in rocky or sandy areas, but is more likely to grow on somewhat clay soils in New Mexico and southeastern Utah. It is associated the desert scrublands and open areas of juniper woodlands. It frequently grows in roadcuts.
