= Coastal strand =

Plant community formed along the shore

Coastal strand is a plant community of flowering plants that form along the shore in loose sand just above the high tide line.

Many plants that grow in this area are endemic to the strand. The community has low species diversity because so few plants can tolerate the harsh conditions of high winds, battering salt spray, and extreme high temperatures in the summer. Plants must also be adapted to sandy saline soils, with extremely low nutrient loads, and low water holding capacity.

Plants that grow along the coast are very tolerant of the winds and salt and sand loaded ocean spray. Many species are succulent, storing salty water in their leaves. The leaves are often light colored or grey green to reflect sunlight and reduce desiccation. Hairy leaves may reduce evapotranspiration, may help gather moisture from the air, and may reflect a small portion of incoming solar radiation thereby reducing the plants internal temperature. They are often very low in height with prostrate stems and spread by rooting at the nodes and may have deep tap roots, both rooting systems helping to anchor the shifting sands as the plants colonize the beach above high tide.

== Pacific coastal strand plants ==
- Asteraceae (sunflower family):
  - Ambrosia chamissonis, greene beach-bur
  - Solidago spathulata subsp. spathulata, coast goldenrod
  - Tanacetum camphoratum, dune tansy
  - Gnaphalium bicolor, (everlasting)
  - Erigeron glaucus, seaside daisy
- Brassicaceae (mustard family)
  - Erysimum insulare
- Caryophyllaceae (pink family)
  - Cardionema ramosissimum
- Crassulaceae (stonecrop family)
  - Dudleya farinosa, bluff lettuce
- Fabaceae (legume family)
  - Lupinus arboreus, yellow bush lupine
  - Lupinus chamissonis, Chamisso bush lupine
- Lamiaceae (mint family)
  - Monardella undulata subsp. crispa, syn. Monardella crispa, crisp monardella
- Nyctaginaceae (four o'clock family)
  - Abronia latifolia, (sand verbena)
  - Abronia maritima, (sand verbena)
  - Abronia umbellata, (sand verbena)
- Onagraceae (evening primrose family)
  - Camissonia cheiranthifolia subsp. suffruticosa, beach evening primrose
- Polygonaceae (buckwheat family)
  - Eriogonum latifolium
- Portulacaceae (purslane family)
  - Calandrinia maritima, seaside calandrinia
- Rosaceae (rose family)
  - Fragaria chiloensis, beach strawberry

Note that common names in parentheses are common names for the family, not the species.
