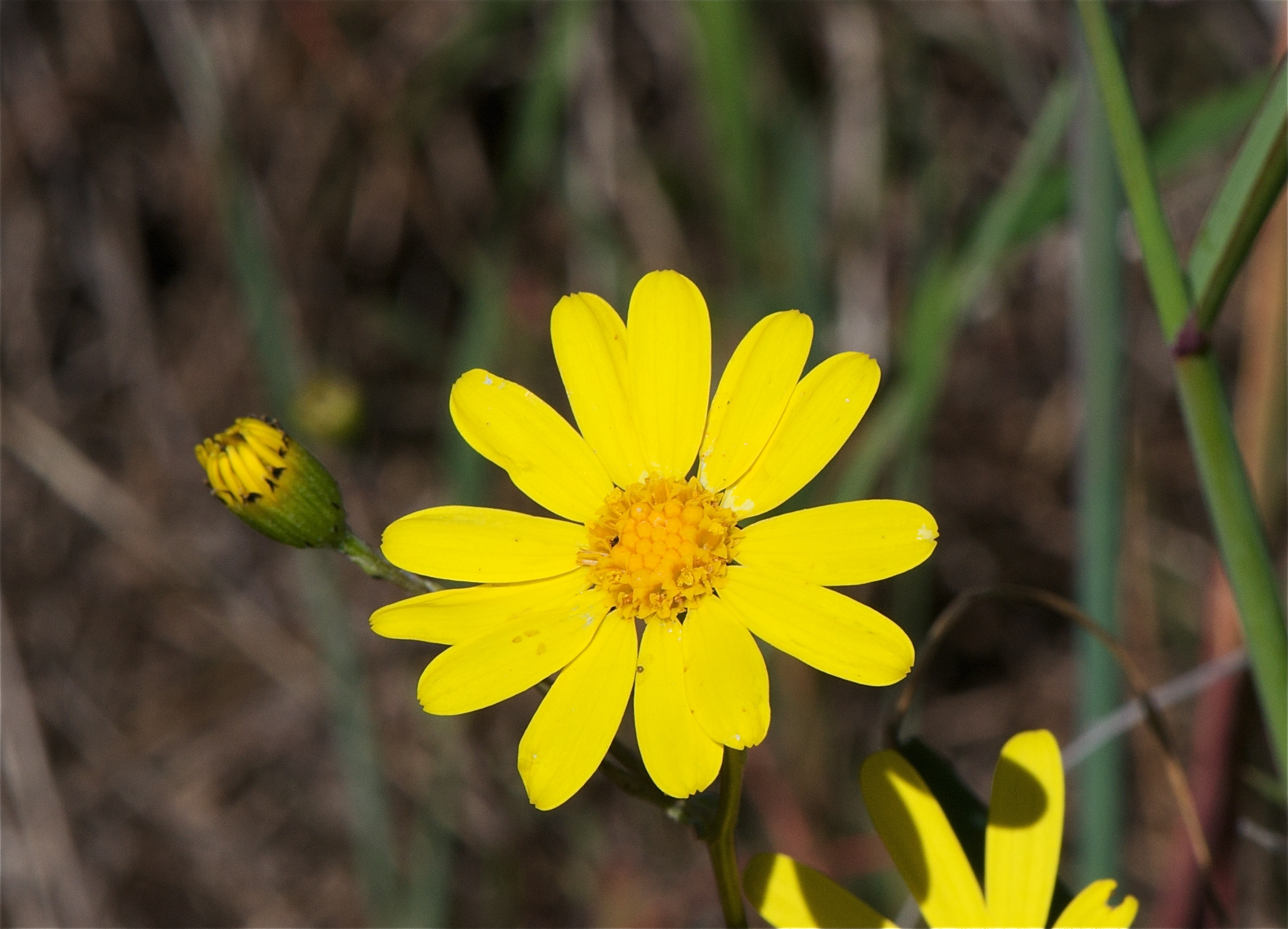

Scientific classification
- Kingdom: Plantae
- Clade: Tracheophytes
- Clade: Angiosperms
- Clade: Eudicots
- Clade: Asterids
- Order: Asterales
- Family: Asteraceae
- Genus: Senecio
- Species: S. californicus

Binomial name
- Senecio californicus DC.

= Senecio californicus =

Species of flowering plant

Senecio californicus is a species of flowering plant in the aster family known by the common name California ragwort.

== Distribution ==
This annual herb is native to Central and Southern California and Baja California. It grows in Coastal strand, Coastal sage scrub, and Chaparral habitats, often in sandy areas.

It is often seen at the coast on sand dunes. It is also often found in the Peninsular Ranges, and is seen into the central/eastern Transverse Ranges.

== Description ==
Senecio californicus grows to 10–40 centimetres (3.9–15.7 in) tall or sometimes taller, from a taproot. The stems can be solitary or grow in branching clusters.

The leaves have linear or lance-shaped blades up to 7 centimeters long. They are sometimes fleshy, especially in plants that occur on the coastline.

The inflorescence produces one to ten or more flower heads, which are lined with usually about 21 black-tipped phyllaries. They contain many yellow disc florets and each has usually 13 yellow ray florets about a centimeter long. The bloom period is March through May.

== See also ==
- Natural history of the California chaparral and woodlands
- Natural history of the Peninsular Ranges
