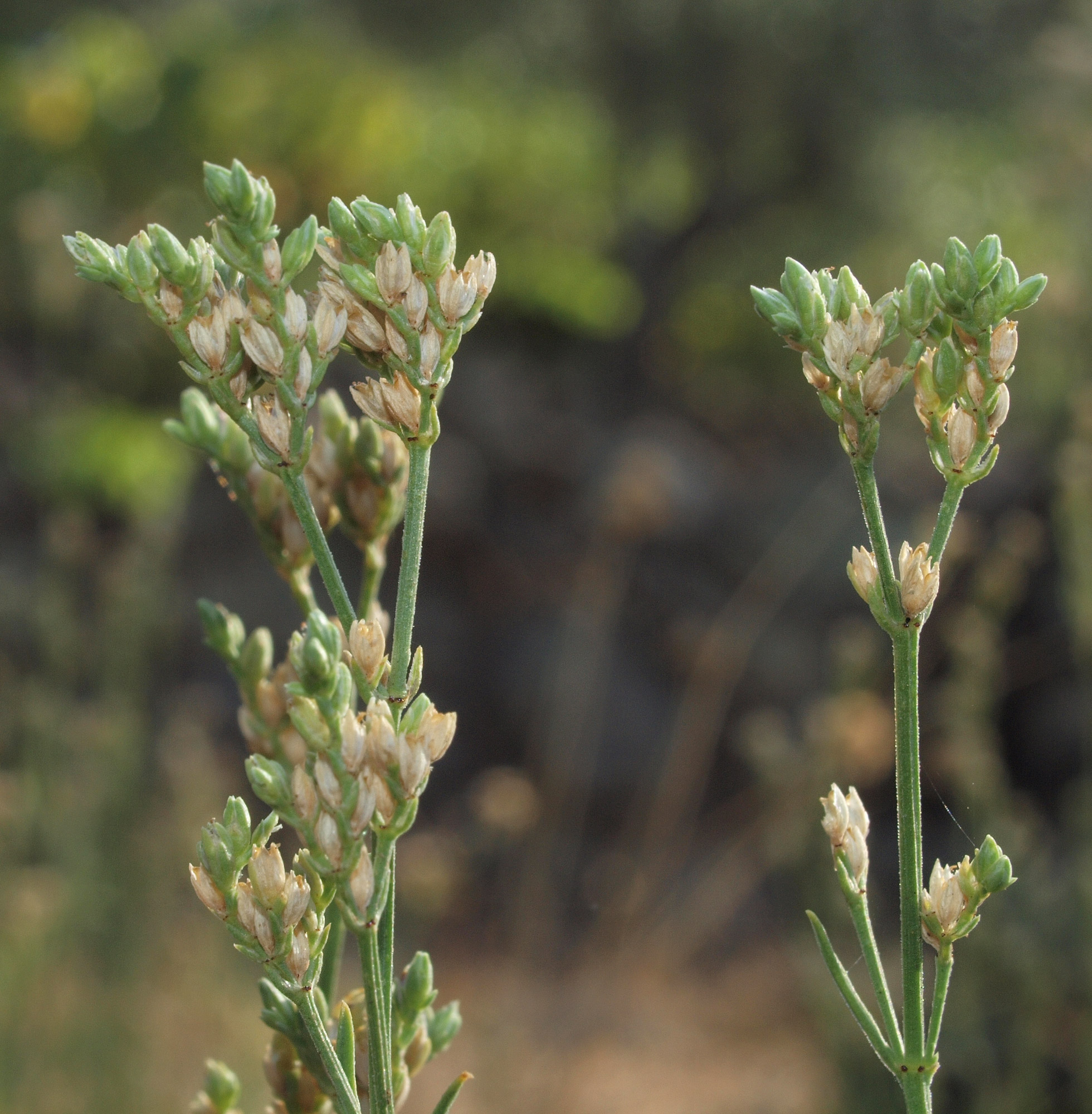

Scientific classification
- Kingdom: Plantae
- Clade: Tracheophytes
- Clade: Angiosperms
- Clade: Eudicots
- Order: Caryophyllales
- Family: Caryophyllaceae
- Genus: Ortegia; Loefl.
- Species: O. hispanica

Binomial name
- Ortegia hispanica L.

Synonyms
- Ortegia dichotoma Hartmann; Terogia dichotoma (Hartmann) Raf.

= Ortegia =

Genus of flowering plant

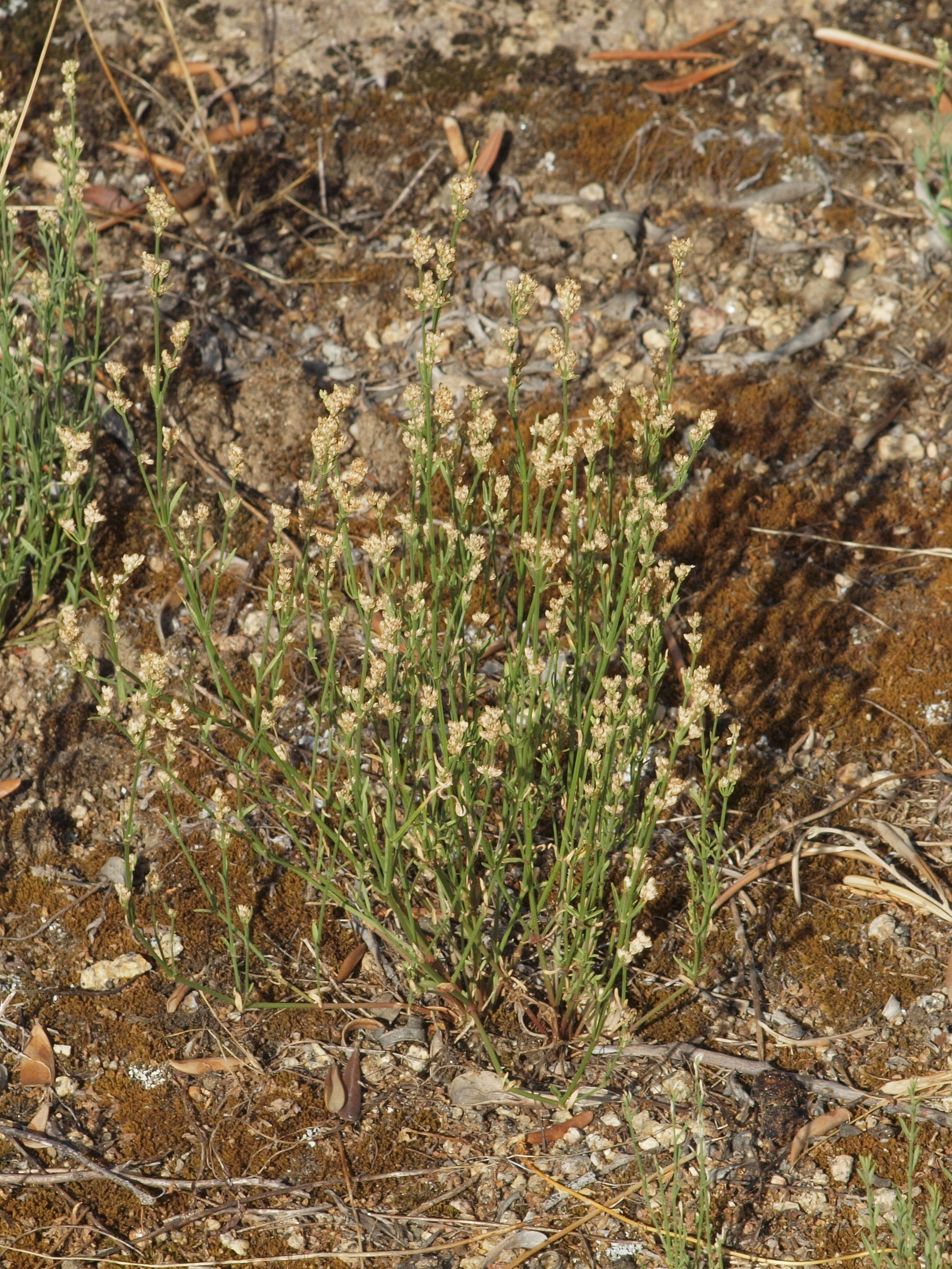
View of the plant in its habitat

Ortegia is a monotypic genus of flowering plants belonging to the family Caryophyllaceae. It only contains one known species, Ortegia hispanica. It is part of the tribe Polycarpaeae, clustering with Cardionema and Illecebrum.

Its native range is the western Mediterranean. It is still found in Portugal and Spain. It is now classed as extinct in Algeria and Italy.

The genus of Ortegia has 3 known synonyms; Cervaria L., Mosina Adans. and Terogia Raf.

The Latin specific epithet of hispanica is derived from Hispanic (Spanish: Hispano) which refers to people, cultures, or countries related to Spain. Both the genus and the species were first described and published in C.Linnaeus's book, Sp. Pl. on page 560 in 1753.

== Etymology ==
The genus name of Ortegia is in honour of José Ortega (d. 1761; not to be confused with Casimiro Gómez Ortega (1741-1818), a botanist, apothecary and doctor), a Spanish military apothecary at the court of Ferdinand VI. He was also the secretary of the royal academy of medicine and director of a medicinal botanical garden in Madrid.

Hispanica is a geographical epithet referring to its location in Hispania.

== Description ==
It is a ± glaucous plant, with a woody stalk. Stems up to 30(60) cm high, junciform, erect -rarely spreading-, strongly branched from the base, with rigid, angular branches, often strongly scabridged at the top. Leaves from 5-15(20) x 1-2 mm, shorter than internodes, sessile, entire, achillate, glabrous, often scabrous at margin; scarious stipules, almost setose, swollen basally in a persistent gland, purplish. Flower bracts scarious, linear-lanceolate, with scabrious margin and keel and 2 small purple glands at base. Sepals are 2-2.5(3) mm, ovate-lanceolate, ± acute, keeled and scarious on the keel, greenish, broadly margined scarious, usually sublacinate. Seeds are small, fusiform, honeyed.

== Distribution and habitat ==
It is found on uncultivated land, slopes or woody rainfed crops, on sandy, acid, that is, siliceous soils; at an altitude of 300-1500 metres in the central west of the Iberian Peninsula, lacking in coastal areas, and reaches the interior of Galicia and in the south to points of the Sierra Morena; reported as adventitious in Algeria (Mascara) and Italy (Piedmont), it seems to have disappeared from these countries, as it has not been collected for a century and a half; there is a modern collection from the Landes de Gascogne, where it may be a recent introduction.

== Taxonomy ==
Ortegia hispanica was described by Loefl ex L. and published in Species Plantarum 560. 1753.

=== Cytology ===
Chromosome number of Ortegia hispanica (Fam. Caryophyllaceae) and infraspecific taxa: 2n=184.

=== Synonymy ===
- Ortega dichotoma L.
- Terogia dichotoma (L.) Raf.

== Common names ==
In Spanish: arvejaquilla, escobilla, hierba de la sangre, hierba juncosa, juncaria.
