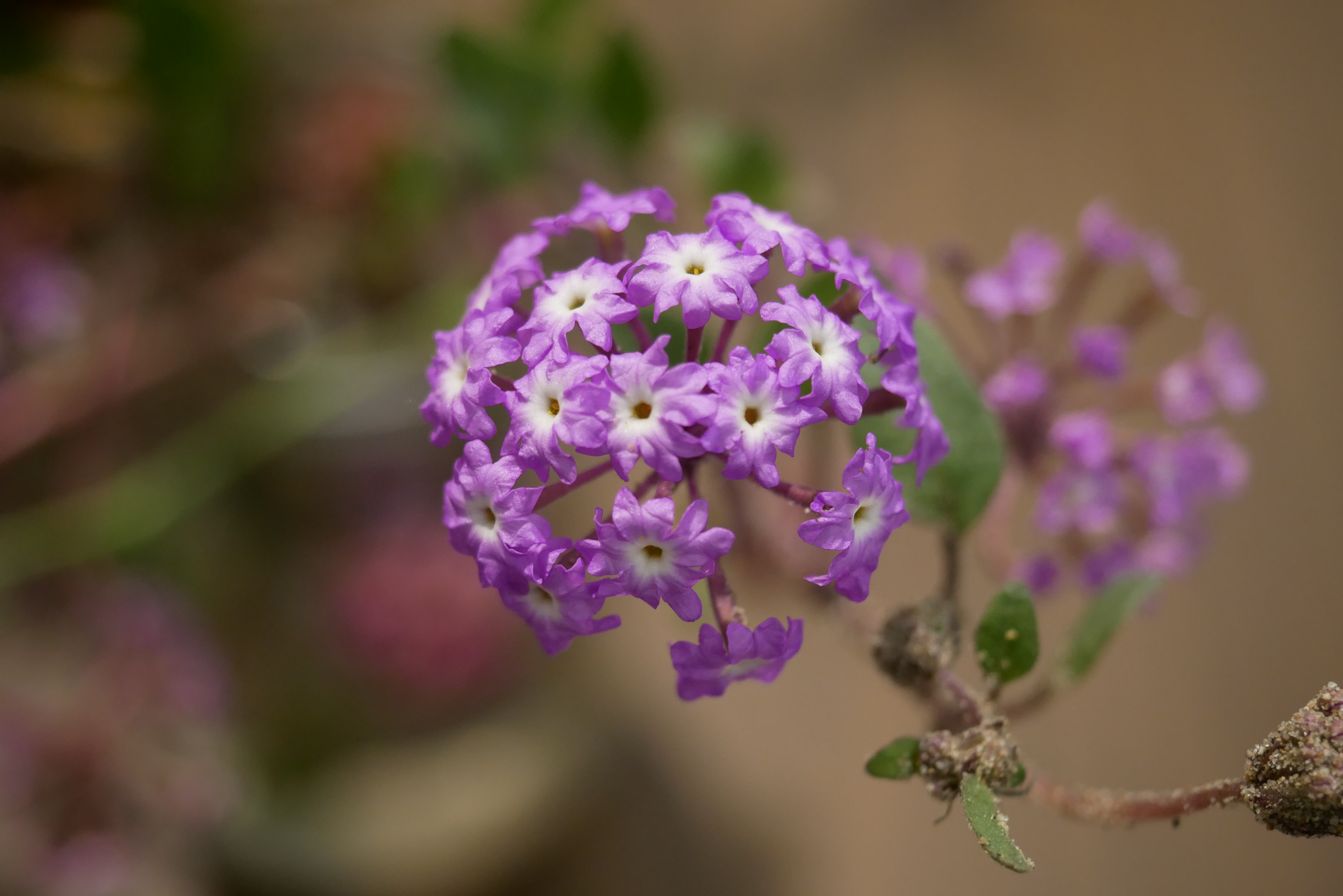
- Flowers of Abronia umbellata

Scientific classification
- Kingdom: Plantae
- Clade: Tracheophytes
- Clade: Angiosperms
- Clade: Eudicots
- Order: Caryophyllales
- Family: Nyctaginaceae
- Tribe: Nyctagineae
- Genus: Abronia; Juss., 1789

Species
- See text

= Abronia (plant) =

Genus of flowering plants

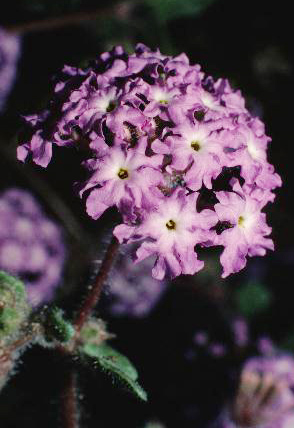
Abronia villosa

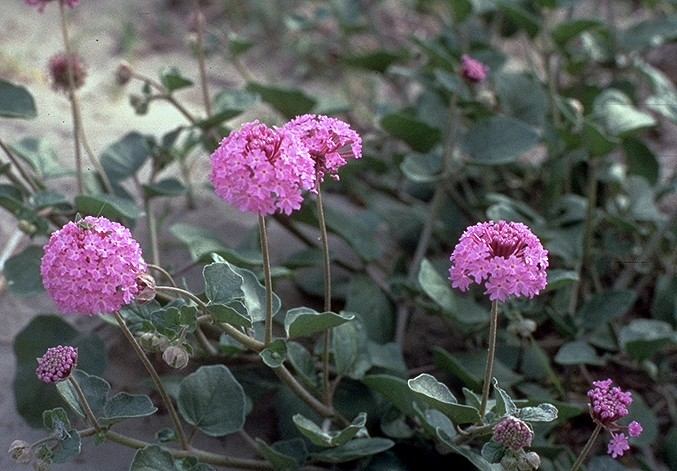
Abronia ameliae

Abronia, the sand-verbenas or wild lantanas, is a genus of about 20 species of annual or perennial herbaceous plants in the family Nyctaginaceae. Despite the common names, they are not related to Verbena (vervains) or lantanas in the family Verbenaceae. They are closely allied with Tripterocalyx.

They are native to western North America, from Alberta and Saskatchewan, Canada, south to west Texas, California, Baja California and central Mexico, growing on dry sandy soils. Abronia macrocarpa, a Texas endemic, is protected under the Endangered Species Act. Abronia ammophila, the Yellowstone sand verbena, is a plant unique to Yellowstone National Park's lakeshores and is endemic to the park. Only a few species are widespread, and many are quite rare. They make very attractive garden plants for hot, dry sandy sites.

== Species ==
Image	Name	Distribution
	Abronia × alba Eastw. (A. maritima × A. umbellata)	California
	Abronia alpina Brandeg.	Tulare County, California
	Abronia ameliae Lundell	From British Columbia, Canada to Baja California, Mexico
	Abronia ammophila Greene	Yellowstone National Park
	Abronia angustifolia Greene	United States (Texas, New Mexico, Arizona) and Northern Mexico (Chihuahua, Coahuila).
	Abronia bigelovii Heimerl	New Mexico
	Abronia elliptica A.Nels.	Wyoming to NW. New Mexico
	Abronia fragrans Nutt. ex Hook.	Northern Arizona to western Texas and Oklahoma, and south to Chihuahua, Mexico
	Abronia glabrifolia Standl.	Utah to NW. Colorado
	Abronia gracilis Benth.	S. California to Mexico (Baja California)
	Abronia latifolia Eschsch.	southern California to southern British Columbia
	Abronia macrocarpa L.A.Galloway	eastern Texas
	Abronia maritima Nutt. ex S.Watson	southern California, including the Channel Islands, and northern Baja California
	Abronia mellifera Douglas ex Hook.	Northwestern United States (Idaho, Wyoming, Oregon, Washington, and Utah)
	Abronia × minor Standl.(A. latifolia × A. umbellata)	California
	Abronia nana S.Watson	Colorado to N. Arizona
	Abronia nealleyi Standl.	S. New Mexico to W. Texas
	Abronia pogonantha Heimerl	California and Nevada
	Abronia turbinata Torr. ex S.Watson	eastern California and Oregon and western Nevada
	Abronia umbellata Lam.	British Columbia, Canada to Baja California, Mexico.
	Abronia villosa S.Watson	southwestern United States and northern Mexico

=== Formerly placed here ===
- Tripterocalyx carneus (Greene) L.A.Galloway (as A. carnea Greene)
- Tripterocalyx crux-maltae (Kellogg) Standl. (as A. crux-maltae Kellogg)
- Tripterocalyx micranthus (Torr.) Hook. (as A. micrantha Torr.)
- Tripterocalyx wootonii Standl. (as A. wootonii (Standl.) Tidestr.)

== Cultivation and uses ==
The stout, sweet root of Abronia fragrans and Abronia latifolia, sometimes over 60 cm long, can be eaten as a root vegetable.
