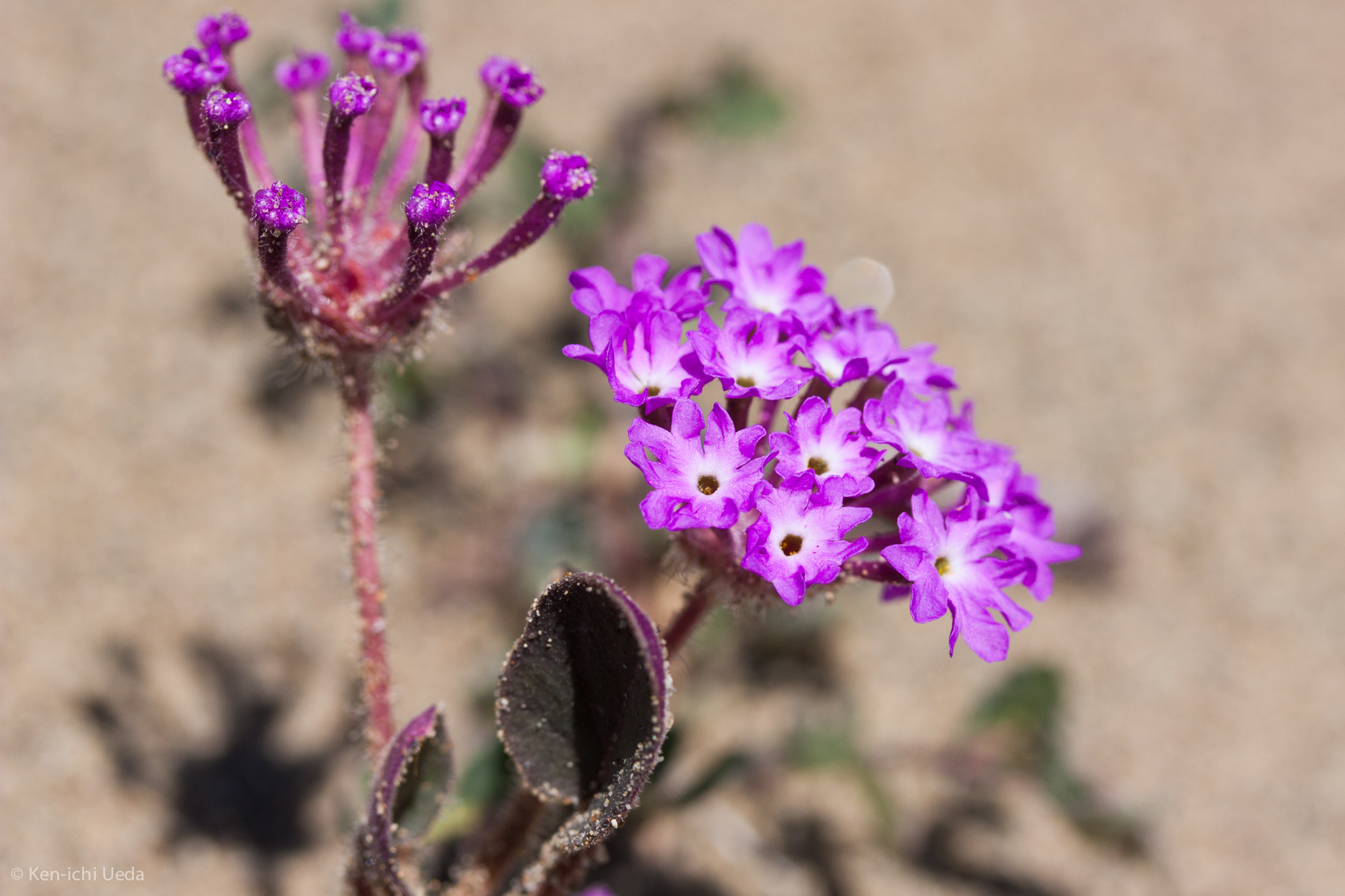

Conservation status
- Vulnerable (NatureServe)

Scientific classification
- Kingdom: Plantae
- Clade: Embryophytes
- Clade: Tracheophytes
- Clade: Spermatophytes
- Clade: Angiosperms
- Clade: Eudicots
- Order: Caryophyllales
- Family: Nyctaginaceae
- Genus: Abronia
- Species: A. pogonantha

Binomial name
- Abronia pogonantha Heimerl

= Abronia pogonantha =

Species of plant

Abronia pogonantha is a species of flowering plant in the four o'clock family (Nyctaginaceae) known by the common name Mojave sand-verbena. It is native to California and Nevada, where it grows in the Mojave Desert, adjacent hills and mountains, and parts of the San Joaquin Valley in the Central Valley.

This is an annual herb producing prostrate or upright glandular stems to about half a meter long. The petioled leaves are mainly oval-shaped and up to 5 centimeters long by 3 wide. The plant blooms in an inflorescence of many white or pink flowers, each with a tube throat up to 2 centimeters long. The fruit is a winged, heart-shaped body about half a centimeter long.
