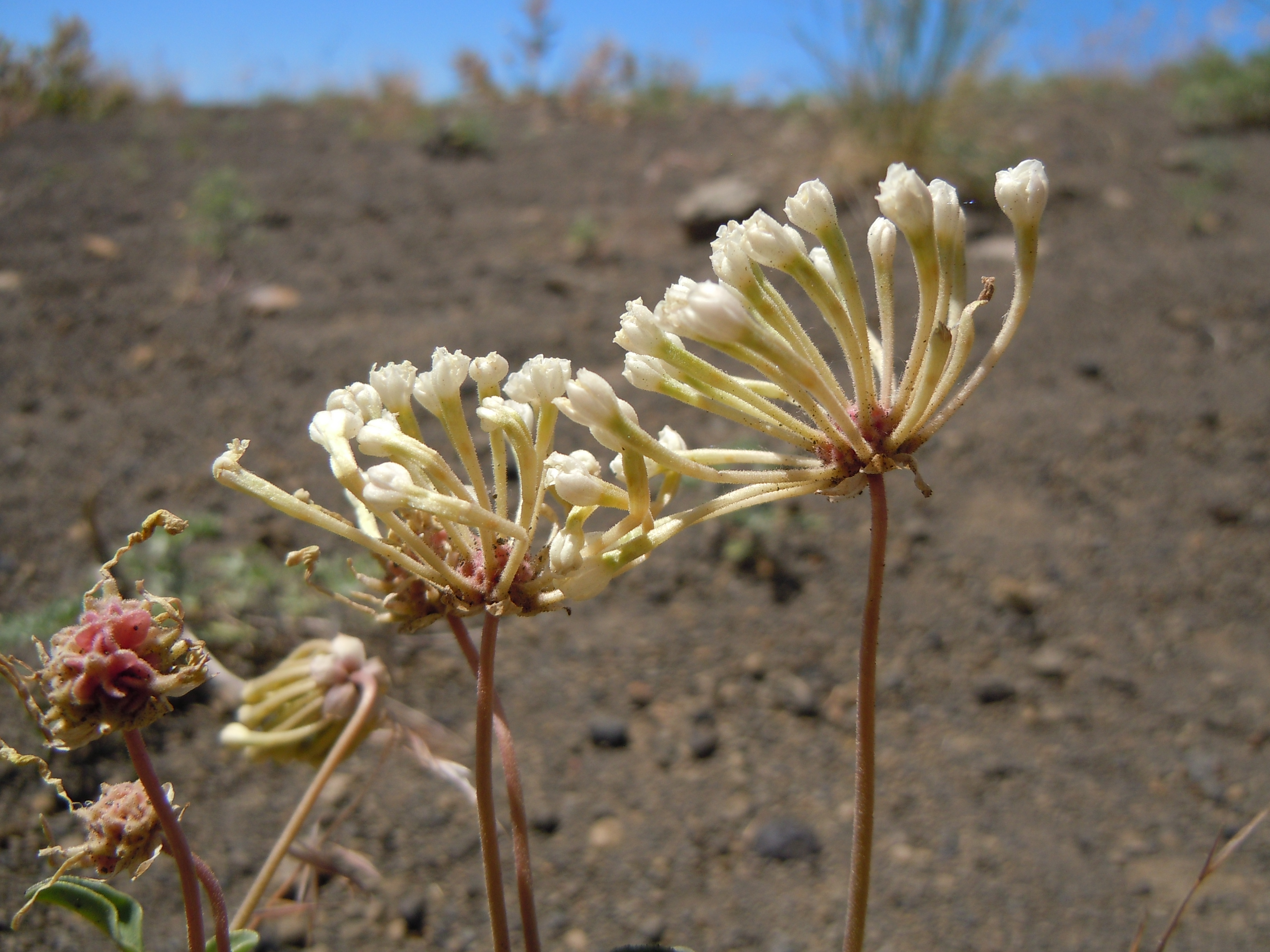

Conservation status
- Apparently Secure (NatureServe)

Scientific classification
- Kingdom: Plantae
- Clade: Tracheophytes
- Clade: Angiosperms
- Clade: Eudicots
- Order: Caryophyllales
- Family: Nyctaginaceae
- Genus: Abronia
- Species: A. mellifera

Binomial name
- Abronia mellifera Douglas ex Hook.

Varieties
- A. mellifera var. mellifera autonym; A. mellifera var. pahoveorum Ertter & Nosratinia

Synonyms
- Abronia umbellata f. mellifera (Douglas ex Hook.) Voss

= Abronia mellifera =

Species of flowering plant

Abronia mellifera, the white sand verbena, is a herbaceous perennial flowering plant in the Nyctaginaceae family. It is endemic to the northwestern United States.

== Description ==
Abronia mellifera is a herbaceous perennial flowering plant with decumbent or ascending stems up to 18 in (46 cm) long. The leaves are attached to petioles 1–6 cm (0.39–2.36 in) long. The leaf blades are ovate to lance-elliptic, and are 1–6 cm long by 0.5–4 cm wide. The leaf margins are entire to sinuate, and the leaf blade surfaces are glabrous or slightly pubescent. Each inflorescence contains 25–60 flowers. The perianth tube is proximally pale rose to distally green, and is 15–25 mm long.

The plant typically flowers from spring to fall.

== Distribution and habitat ==
Abronia mellifera is endemic to the Northwestern United States (Idaho, Wyoming, Oregon, Washington, and Utah). It is found in grasslands, sandy soils, and cold desert scrub at elevations of 100–2,000 m (330–6,560 ft) above sea level.

== Conservation ==
As of December 2024, the conservation group NatureServe listed Abronia mellifera as Apparently Secure (G4) worldwide. This status was last reviewed on 4 June 2024. At the state level, the species is listed as No Status Rank (not assessed) in Oregon, Washington and Utah; Vulnerable (S3) in Wyoming; and Critically Imperiled (S1) in Idaho.

== Taxonomy ==
Abronia mellifera was first fully named and described in 1829 by David Douglas in the Botanical Magazine.

=== Subdivisions ===
As of December 2024, Plants of the World Online accepts two varieties for this species:

- A. mellifera var. mellifera autonym. from Washington to Utah
- A. mellifera var. pahoveorum Ertter & Nosratinia. from Idaho

=== Etymology ===
In English, this species is commonly known as the white sand verbena.
