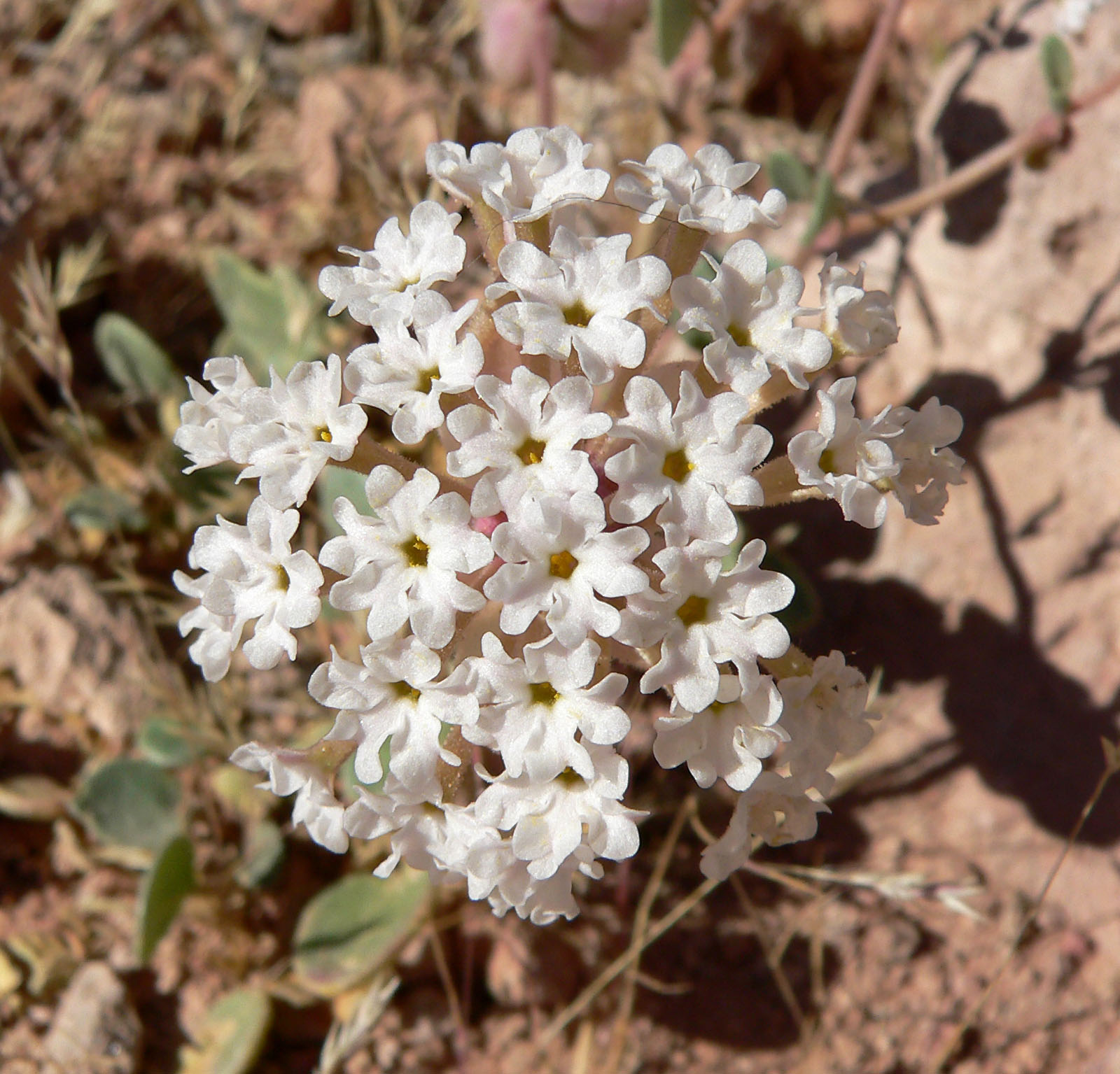

Conservation status
- Apparently Secure (NatureServe)

Scientific classification
- Kingdom: Plantae
- Clade: Embryophytes
- Clade: Tracheophytes
- Clade: Spermatophytes
- Clade: Angiosperms
- Clade: Eudicots
- Order: Caryophyllales
- Family: Nyctaginaceae
- Genus: Abronia
- Species: A. turbinata

Binomial name
- Abronia turbinata Torr. ex S.Watson

Synonyms
- Abronia exalata Standl.; Abronia latiuscula Greene; Abronia orbiculata Standl.

= Abronia turbinata =

Plant species in the four o'clock family

Abronia turbinata is a species of flowering plant in the four o'clock family known by the common name transmontane sand-verbena. It is native to eastern California and Oregon and western Nevada, where it grows in desert and plateau scrub.

This is an erect or spreading herb, usually an annual, approaching 50 centimetres (1 ft 8 in) in maximum stem height or length. It produces several thick green leaves which are somewhat oval to nearly round and a few centimeters wide. Inflorescences arise from the stem on peduncles of several centimeters and hold hemispheric or spreading clusters of up to 35 white to pinkish flowers. Each small flower in the cluster is a narrow tube up to 2 centimetres (0.79 in) long which abruptly spreads into a lobed corolla. The fruit is a few millimeters long and has hollow, inflated wings.
