= Tripterocalyx crux-maltae =

- East of Hot Springs Mountain in Douglas County, Nevada

Conservation status
- Apparently Secure (NatureServe)

Scientific classification
- Kingdom: Plantae
- Clade: Tracheophytes
- Clade: Angiosperms
- Clade: Eudicots
- Order: Caryophyllales
- Family: Nyctaginaceae
- Genus: Tripterocalyx
- Species: T. crux-maltae

Binomial name
- Tripterocalyx crux-maltae (Kellogg) Standl.

Synonyms
- Abronia crux-maltae

Plant species in the four o'clock family

Tripterocalyx crux-maltae is a species of flowering plant in the four o'clock family known by the common names Lassen sandverbena and cross sand-verbena.

== Description ==
Tripterocalyx crux-maltae grows in a patch on the ground, the multibranched stems spreading not more than 30 centimeters long. The stems are reddish in color and coated in sticky glandular hairs.

Each leaf has a fleshy green blade up to 7 centimeters long which is borne on a long petiole. The herbage is sticky in texture.

The inflorescence is a head of several elongated flowers borne on long, glandular pedicels all attached at the small central receptacle. Each trumpet-shaped purple or magenta flower may be up to 2.5 centimeters in length and over a centimeter wide at the face of the corolla, with 4 or 5 lobes.

The fruit has wide, thin, net-veined or ribbed wings and hairy surfaces.

== Taxonomy ==
In 1860 the botanist Albert Kellogg described a new plant species in the genus Abronia, which he named Abronia crux-maltae. In 1909 it was moved by Paul Carpenter Standley to Tripterocalyx, giving the species its accepted name. Together with its genus it is classified in the Nyctaginaceae family and has no other botanical synonyms.

== Distribution ==
It is native to a section of the Great Basin straddling the far northern California-Nevada border, where it grows in sagebrush habitat. It is nearly endemic to Nevada, with only one occurrence present in Lassen County, California.
