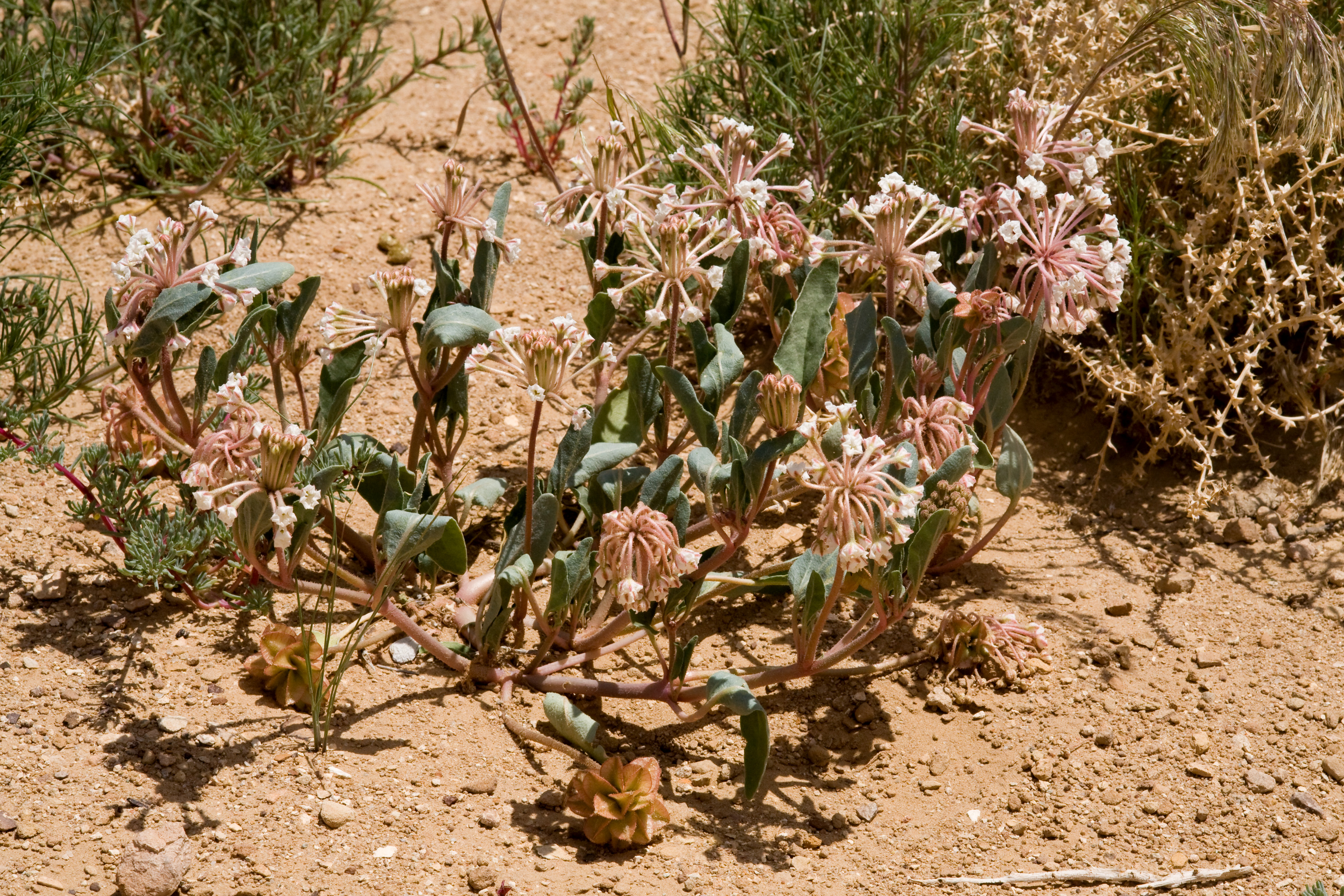
- Tripterocalyx carneus

Scientific classification
- Kingdom: Plantae
- Clade: Tracheophytes
- Clade: Angiosperms
- Clade: Eudicots
- Order: Caryophyllales
- Family: Nyctaginaceae
- Tribe: Nyctagineae
- Genus: Tripterocalyx (Torr.) Hook.

= Tripterocalyx =

Genus of flowering plants

Tripterocalyx is a small genus of flowering plants in the four o'clock family, Nyctaginaceae. It contains four species formerly included in the closely related genus Abronia, the sand-verbenas. These plants are native to North America, especially the dry desert southwest of the United States. They bloom in heads of several colorful trumpet-shaped flowers. Sandpuffs or sand-verbenas are common names for plants in this genus.

== Species ==
There are four species in the genus Tripterocalyx:

- Tripterocalyx carneus – winged sandpuffs
- Tripterocalyx crux-maltae – Kellogg's sand-verbena
- Tripterocalyx micranthus – small-flowered sand-verbena
- Tripterocalyx wootonii (sometimes treated as a variety of T. carneus) – Wooton's sandpuffs
