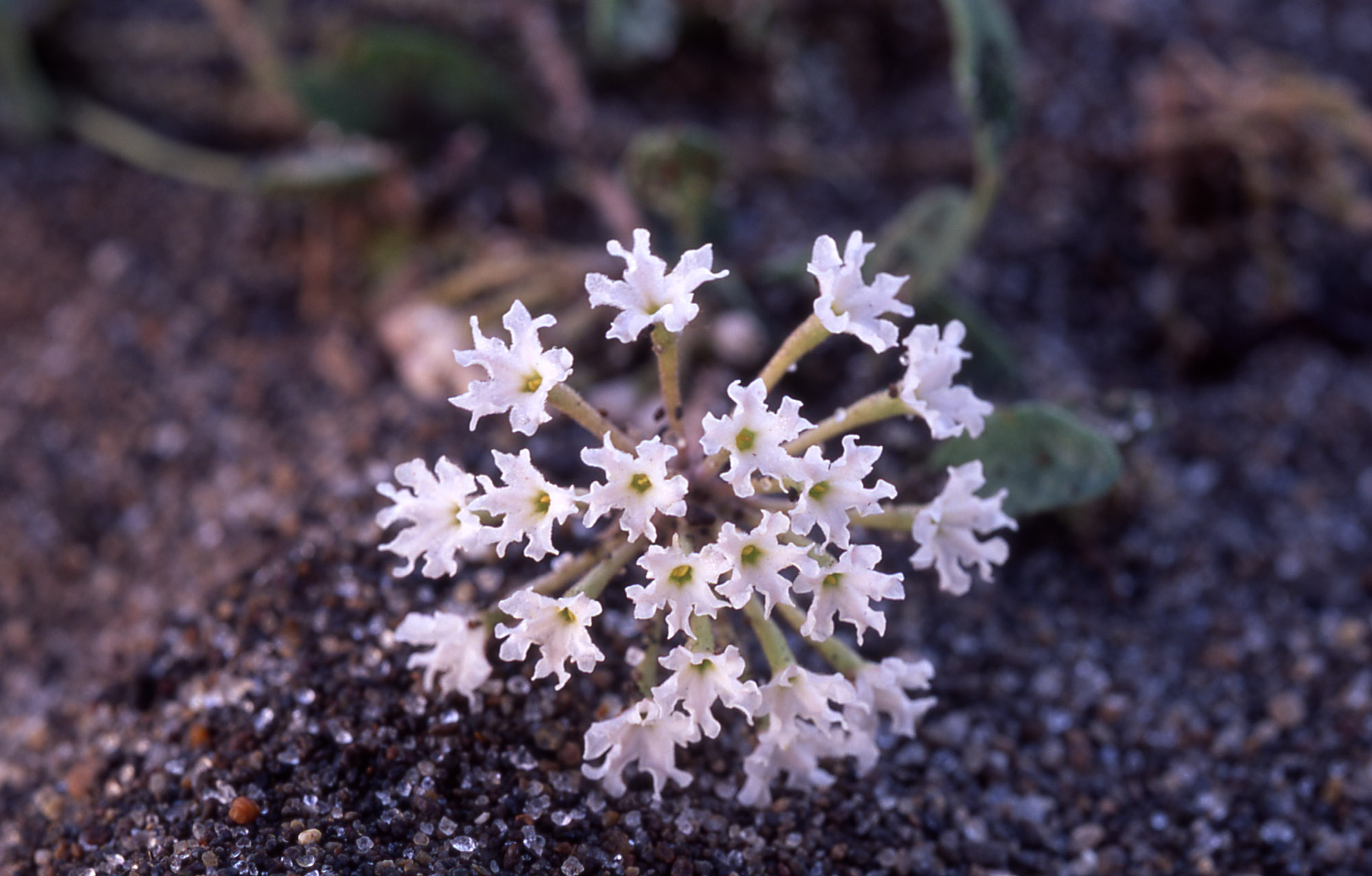

Conservation status
- Endangered (IUCN 3.1)

- Critically Imperiled (NatureServe)

Scientific classification
- Kingdom: Plantae
- Clade: Tracheophytes
- Clade: Angiosperms
- Clade: Eudicots
- Order: Caryophyllales
- Family: Nyctaginaceae
- Genus: Abronia
- Species: A. ammophila

Binomial name
- Abronia ammophila Greene

= Abronia ammophila =

Species of flowering plant

Abronia ammophila, the Yellowstone sand verbena, or Wyoming sand verbena, is a flowering plant unique to Yellowstone National Park lakeshores and is endemic to the park. Part of the "Four o'clock" family (Nyctaginaceae), Abronia ammophila is best suited in sandy soils and lake shores.

The presence of a sand verbena on the Yellowstone Plateau is surprising because of the high elevation of approximately 7,740 ft (2,360 m) and long, cold winters. Yellowstone sand verbena is a member of a New World plant family that typically lives in warmer climates such as deserts. The genus Abronia includes about 30 species that primarily occur in warmer areas of the western United States and Mexico. Some botanists speculate that the thermal activity in Yellowstone has made it possible for a sand verbena to survive the harsh winters here and slowly evolve into a species that is adapted to this climate.

In recent surveys, botanists have located four populations of Yellowstone sand verbena, but very little is known about its life history and biology. For example, the plant is represented as an annual in the scientific literature, although it is actually a perennial that overwinters underground as a large root system.

== Distribution ==
This species was more widely distributed around the lake. Due to trampling by foot traffic and habitat degradation, the population of the species within the park decreased 56% between 1998 and 2010.

== Description ==
It is a perennial herb with prostrate stems up to 4 dm long, which are sticky and hairy. Head-like clusters of whitish, tubular flowers surrounded by 5 oval bracts bloom in July and August.
