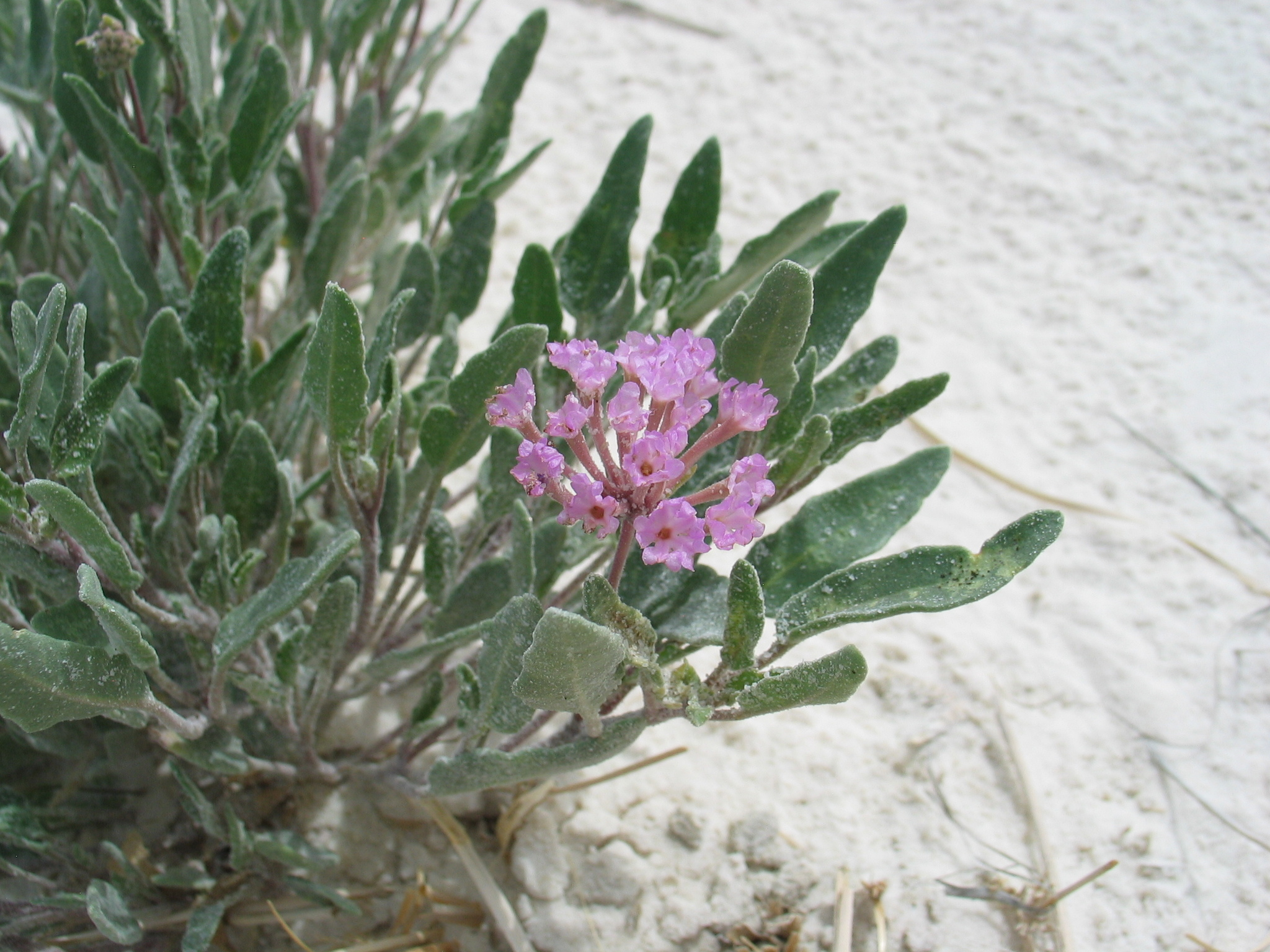

Scientific classification
- Kingdom: Plantae
- Clade: Tracheophytes
- Clade: Angiosperms
- Clade: Eudicots
- Order: Caryophyllales
- Family: Nyctaginaceae
- Genus: Abronia
- Species: A. angustifolia

Binomial name
- Abronia angustifolia Greene

= Abronia angustifolia =

Species of flowering plant

Abronia angustifolia, also known as narrow-leaf sand verbena, is a perennial herbaceous plant recognized for its distinctive narrow, linear leaves, hence the name angustifolia (Latin for "narrow-leaved") and clusters of small, tubular flowers that are typically pink or purplish.

== Description ==
Like other members of the Abronia genus, it produces flowers arranged in dense, spherical clusters. The flowers emit a sweet fragrance, particularly in the evening, as they are adapted for pollination by nocturnal insects such as moths.

== Habitat ==
Abronia angustifolia is native to North America, particularly in arid and semi-arid regions. Its natural range includes sandy deserts, coastal dunes, and grasslands, often found in the Southwestern United States (Texas, New Mexico, Arizona) and Northern Mexico (Chihuahua, Coahuila). It thrives in sandy, well-drained soils with full sun exposure, and is a common sight in areas where vegetation is sparse due to low water availability.
