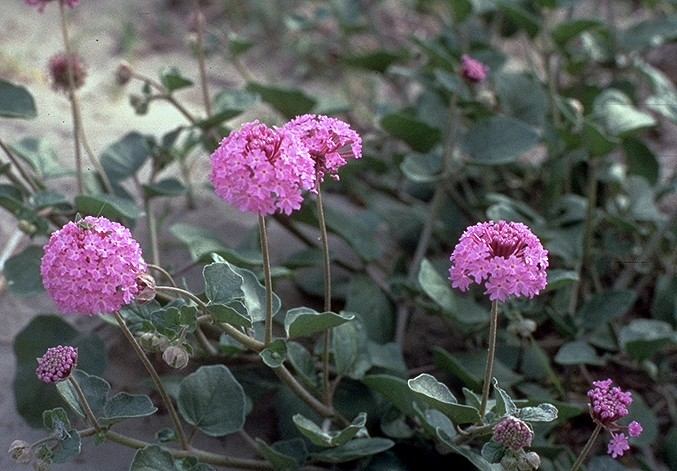

Conservation status
- Vulnerable (NatureServe)

Scientific classification
- Kingdom: Plantae
- Clade: Embryophytes
- Clade: Tracheophytes
- Clade: Angiosperms
- Clade: Eudicots
- Order: Caryophyllales
- Family: Nyctaginaceae
- Genus: Abronia
- Species: A. ameliae

Binomial name
- Abronia ameliae Lundell, 1945

= Abronia ameliae =

Species of flowering plant

Abronia ameliae, commonly known as Amelia's sand verbena or heart's delight, is a species of flowering plant in the Four O'clock family, Nyctaginaceae, that is endemic to southern Texas in the United States. It inhabits grasslands in the deep sands of the Holocene sand sheet, which is part of the Tamaulipan mezquital. This species was named for Amelia Anderson Lundell, wife of Cyrus Longworth Lundell.
