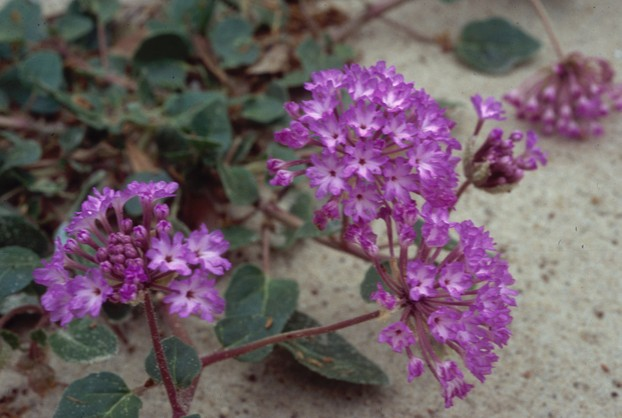

Conservation status
- Imperiled (NatureServe)

Scientific classification
- Kingdom: Plantae
- Clade: Tracheophytes
- Clade: Angiosperms
- Clade: Eudicots
- Order: Caryophyllales
- Family: Nyctaginaceae
- Genus: Abronia
- Species: A. macrocarpa

Binomial name
- Abronia macrocarpa L.A.Galloway

= Abronia macrocarpa =

Species of flowering plant

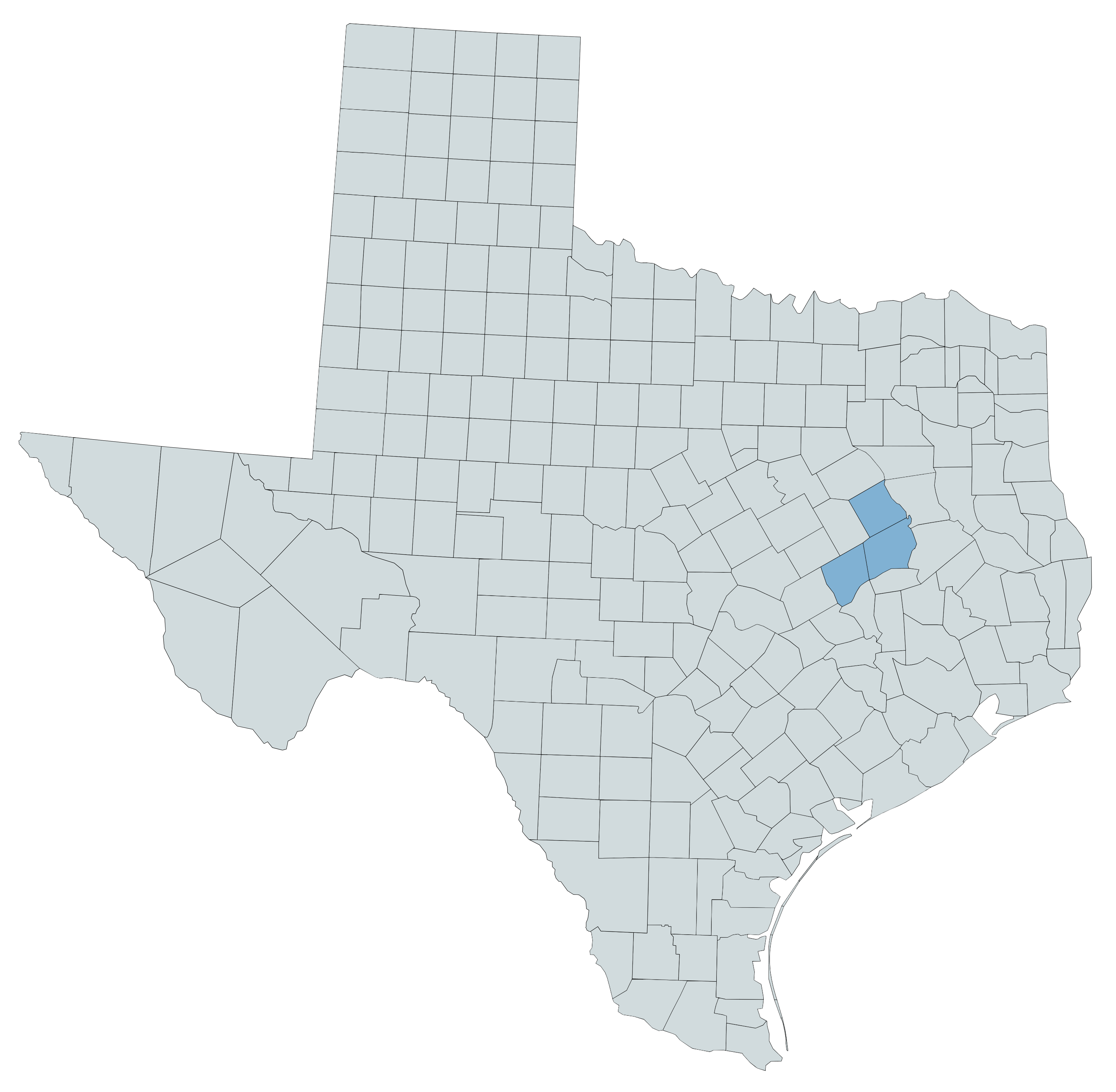
Abronia macrocarpa range

Abronia macrocarpa, also known as the large-fruited sand verbena or large-fruit sand verbena, is a rare species of flowering plant in the four o'clock family (Nyctaginaceae). It is endemic to post oak savannas in three counties of eastern Texas.

where its current range is limited to Freestone, Leon, and Robertson counties. It inhabits harsh, open sand dunes on savannas, growing in deep, poor soils. It was first collected in 1968 and described as a new species in 1972. It is a federally listed endangered species of the United States.

== Description ==
Abronia macrocarpa is a perennial herb with a hairy, glandular stem growing up to half a meter (1.6 feet) tall. The glandular oval leaf blades are up to 5 centimeters long by 3.5 centimeters wide, and are borne on relatively long petioles. The leaves have sticky hairs on them, which frequently collect sand. The inflorescence is a cluster of up to 75 magenta or light purple flowers, each of which is up to 3 centimeters long. The tubular, strongly fragrant flowers open at dusk and are pollinated by moths. The winged fruit is up to 1.5 centimeters long. It is dispersed by wind.

== Habitat and Distribution ==
The range of the large-fruited sand verbena spans an 80 kilometer (50 mile) area. Its natural habitat consists of deep, very well-drained, unstable Eocene-aged sands with little other vegetation, often in openings of post-oak woodlands. Some individuals have been observed in actively blowing sand dunes. It is an edaphic endemic, meaning that, within its range, it only occurs on specific soil types. Nine total populations have been documented, numbering from 750 to 30,000 individuals. The total population of large-fruited sand verbena is about 95,000 individuals. All known occurrences of this plant are on privately owned land.

Threats to this endangered species include habitat loss as its range is consumed for development and oil exploration. The habitat is also damaged by off-road vehicles, people on foot and on horseback, fire suppression activity, and the invasion of non-native species such as bermudagrass (Cynodon dactylon) and weeping lovegrass (Eragrostis curvula).

Abronia macrocarpa flowers between February and May, often after heavy rainfall. It is pollinated by sphinx moths and disperses its fruit in the summer months, at which point the plants die back and re-emerge in the fall. Plants are self-infertile, and only plant-to-plant crosses produce viable fruit.

== Historical uses ==
Native Americans used the roots and leaves to treat topical skin injuries, and the roots were at times mixed with cornmeal and used as food. The flowers were at later times used for scented oils and as dyes for wool.
