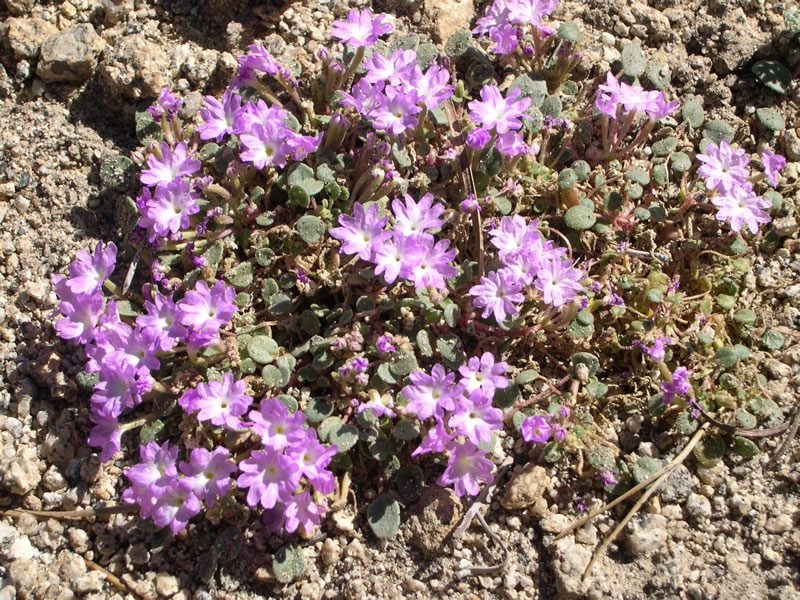

Conservation status
- Critically Endangered (IUCN 3.1)

- Imperiled (NatureServe)

Scientific classification
- Kingdom: Plantae
- Clade: Tracheophytes
- Clade: Angiosperms
- Clade: Eudicots
- Order: Caryophyllales
- Family: Nyctaginaceae
- Genus: Abronia
- Species: A. alpina

Binomial name
- Abronia alpina Brandegee

= Abronia alpina =

Species of flowering plant

Abronia alpina is a rare species of flowering plant in the four o'clock family known by the common names Ramshaw Meadows sand verbena and Ramshaw Meadows abronia. It is endemic to Tulare County, California, where it is known from only one area high in the Sierra Nevada.

== Description ==
This is a small, squat perennial herb which forms a flat to mounded mat on the floor of alpine meadow habitat. The leaves have rounded blades each less than a centimeter long at the ends of short petioles. The foliage and stems are fuzzy and glandular. The plant blooms in clusters of up to five white to pink or lavender flowers around a centimeter wide and long.
