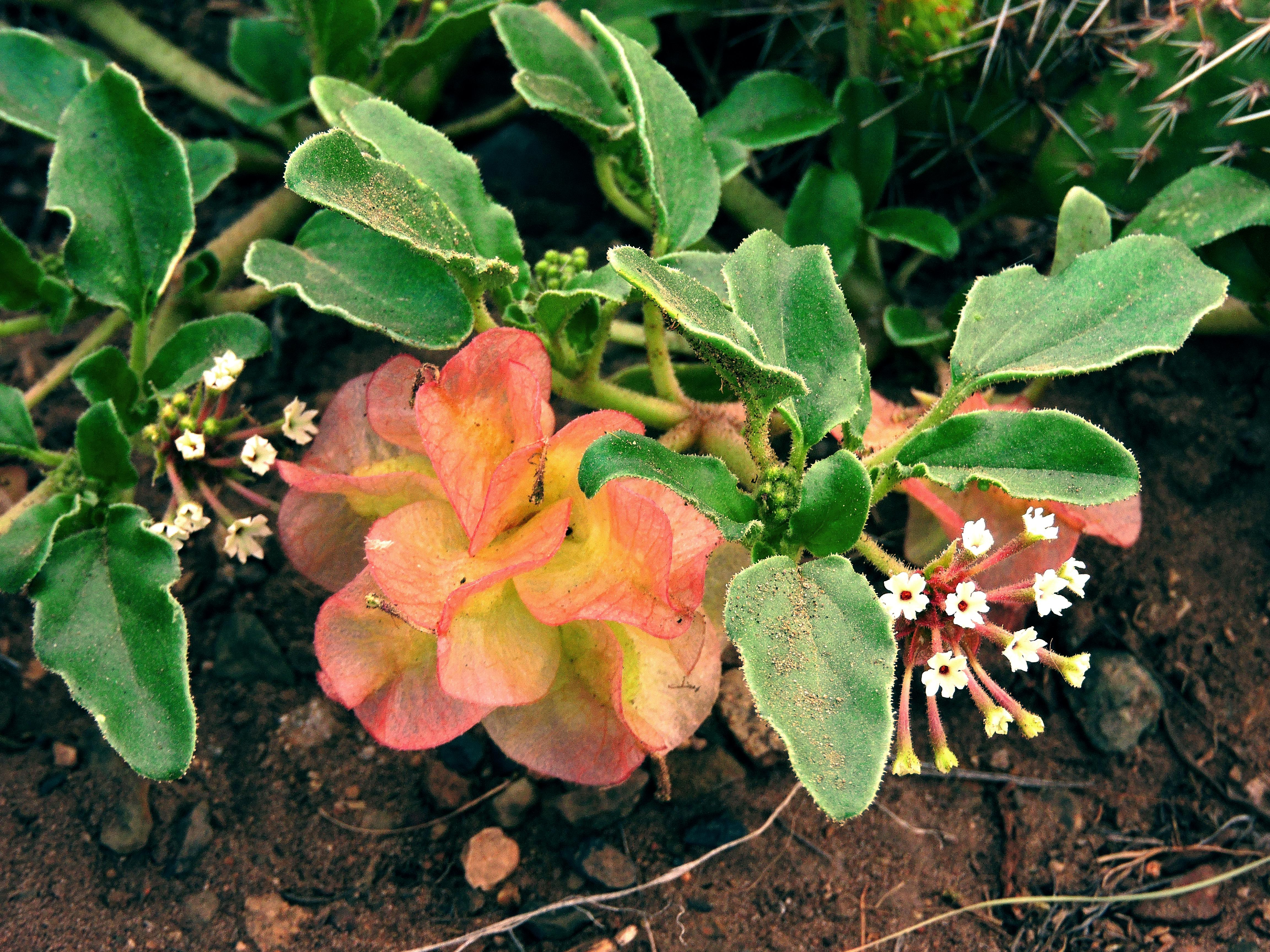
- In Great Sand Dunes National Park

Conservation status
- Apparently Secure (NatureServe)

Scientific classification
- Kingdom: Plantae
- Clade: Tracheophytes
- Clade: Angiosperms
- Clade: Eudicots
- Order: Caryophyllales
- Family: Nyctaginaceae
- Genus: Tripterocalyx
- Species: T. micranthus

Binomial name
- Tripterocalyx micranthus (Torr.) Hook.

Synonyms
- List: Abronia cycloptera A.Gray; Abronia micrantha Torr.; Abronia micrantha Choisy; Abronia micrantha var. pedunculata M.E.Jones; Abronia pedunculata Rydb.; Apaloptera annua Nutt. ex Hook.; Cycloptera annua Nutt.; Tripterocalyx cyclopterus (A.Gray) Standl.; Tripterocalyx pedunculatus (Rydb.) Standl.

= Tripterocalyx micranthus =

Plant species in the four o'clock family

Tripterocalyx micranthus is a species of flowering plant in the four o'clock family known by the common names smallflower sandverbena and small-flowered sand-verbena.

It is native to North America, where it is known from southern Alberta and Saskatchewan through a section of the central United States toward the desert southwest in California, Arizona, and New Mexico. It can be found in several types of habitat, including sandy and scrubby desert regions and sagebrush.

== Description ==
Tripterocalyx micranthus is erect and branched but generally compact, its hairy, glandular stem reaching a maximum length near 60 centimeters. The stem is red in color and sticky in texture.

Each leaf has a fleshy, hairy green blade up to 6 centimeters long which is borne on a long petiole.

The inflorescence is a head of several elongated flowers borne on long, glandular pedicels all attached at the small central receptacle. Each trumpet-shaped pink or green-tinged flower may be up to 1.8 centimeters in length and up to half a centimeter wide at the face of the corolla, with 4 or 5 lobes.

The fruit has wide, thin, net-veined or ribbed wings extending from a central body. It is an annual herb and its native habitats include prairies, meadows, and fields.

== Range ==
Smallflower sandverbena is native to western North America in southern Canada and the central United States. In Canada it grows in the provinces of Alberta and Saskatchewan. In the US state of Montana it is mainly found in the eastern parts of the state and also in scattered areas of western North Dakota. To the south the species is only recorded in Harding County in South Dakota, but is widespread in Wyoming. Its range extends through many parts of eastern Colorado, but is only known from Moffat County in the west. In New Mexico it mainly grows in the northwest while it grows in the four northern counties of Arizona. The species is also widespread in Utah, however it is only known from Lincoln and Clark counties in Nevada and San Bernardino County in southern California.
