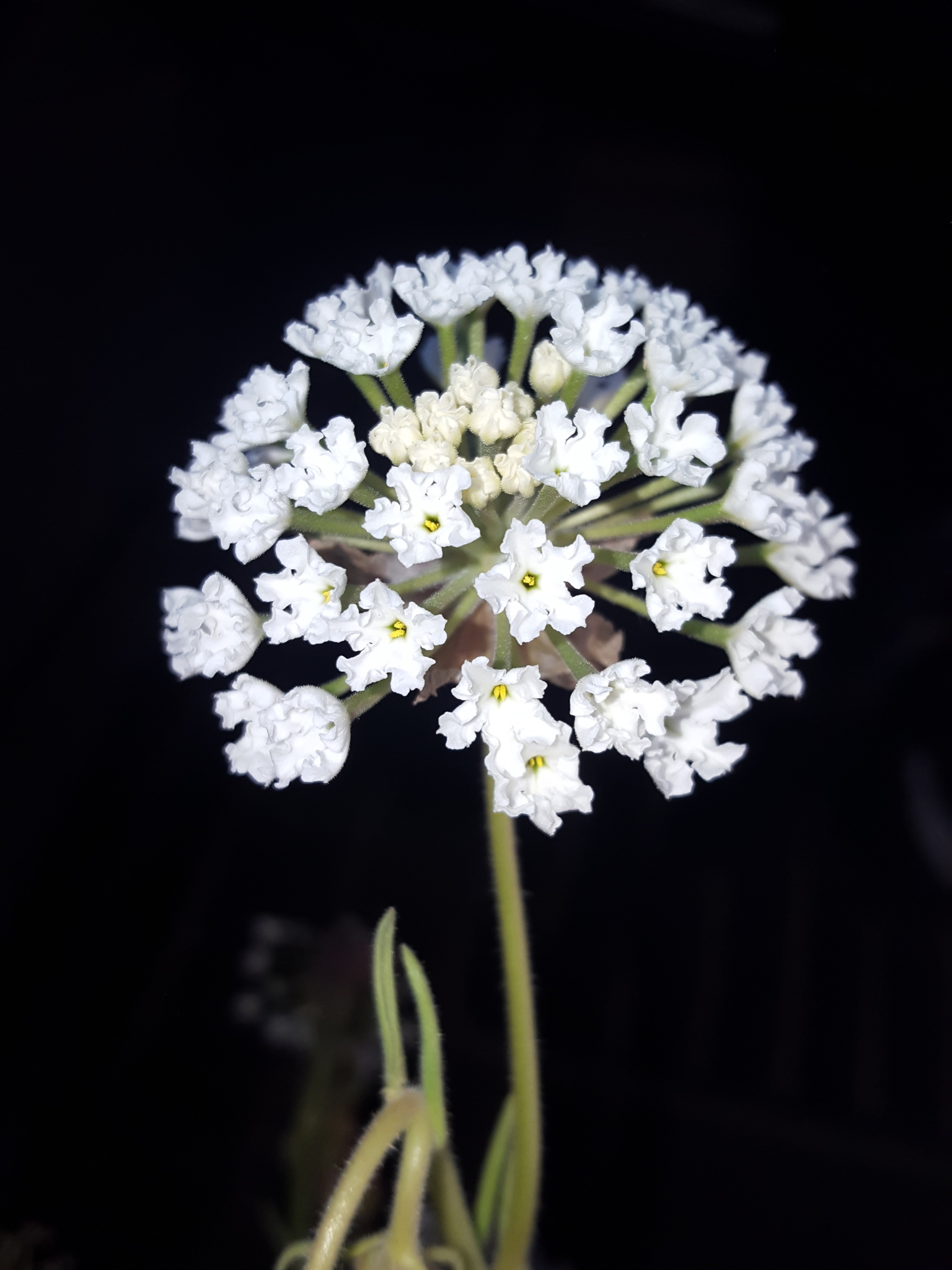

Conservation status
- Secure (NatureServe)

Scientific classification
- Kingdom: Plantae
- Clade: Tracheophytes
- Clade: Angiosperms
- Clade: Eudicots
- Order: Caryophyllales
- Family: Nyctaginaceae
- Genus: Abronia
- Species: A. fragrans

Binomial name
- Abronia fragrans Nutt. ex Hook.

Synonyms
- List: Abronia carletonii J.M.Coult. & Fisher; Abronia fendleri Standl.; Abronia fragrans var. glaucescens A.Nelson; Abronia glaucescens (A.Nelson) Standl.; Abronia kermesina Lindh. & G.M.Ross; Abronia nudata Rydb.; Abronia robusta Standl.; Abronia speciosa Buckley; Abronia texana Standl.; Abronia turbinata var. carletonii (J.M.Coult. & Fisher) M.E.Jones

= Abronia fragrans =

Plant species in the four o'clock family

Abronia fragrans, the sweet sand-verbena, snowball sand-verbena, prairie snowball or fragrant verbena, is a species of sand verbena.

== Description ==
Abronia fragrans, sweet sand-verbena, is an herbaceous perennial with an upright or sprawling growth habit, reaching 8–40 inches (about 20–102 cm). It grows from a taproot with sticky, hairy stems growing from 7.1 inches to 3.3 feet (18–100 cm) long.

The flowers consist of 4 to 5 petaloid sepals and sepaloid bracts with a tubular corolla borne in clusters of 25 to 80 at the ends of stems. The blossoms are usually white but may be green-, lavender-, or pink-tinged. The sticky leaves are simple and opposite, up to 3.5 in (8.9 cm) long and 1.2 in (3.0 cm) wide, and elliptical or linear. The fruits are egg-shaped achenes about 0.1 in (0.25 cm) long, lustrous, and black or brown. The achene is enclosed within a leathery top-shaped calyx base which may or may not be winged.

The flowers of this plant open in the evening and close again in the morning, a habit which gives the Nyctaginaceae family its common name of four o' clocks. The blossoms are a pure white throughout most of its range, but in southern areas they sometimes have a slight blush of lavender-pink. The flowering recurs irregularly from June until late fall.

== Taxonomy ==
There is dispute as to the classification of Abronia fragrans, with some recognizing Abronia elliptica as a separate species (Kartesz, Weber) and others believing that the two are the same plant (Welsh). The separation of the two species is based on variances of several characteristics including the shape of the fruit, the hairiness of various parts of the plants, and rhizomatous spreading.

This species was collected by Thomas Nuttall in 1834 near the Platte River and was named by him in Hookers 1853 description. The species name, fragrans, means 'fragrant' and refers to the sweet smell of the blossoms, while the genus name is from the Greek "abros" meaning delicate.

== Distribution and habitat ==
The native range of sweet sand-verbena extends from Northern Arizona to western Texas and Oklahoma north through the Rocky Mountain and western plains regions of the United States and south to Chihuahua, Mexico. Sweet sand-verbena occurs in prairies, plains, and savannas where it can be found growing in loose, dry, sandy soils.

== Cultivation ==
Sweet sand-verbena is grown in gardens for its attractive blossoms and fragrance, and to attract butterflies. In garden settings it is not as exacting of soil requirements as it is in the wild.

== Uses ==
The Indigenous peoples of the Southwest use the plant as a wash for sores and insect bites, to treat stomachache, and as an appetite booster. Among the Navajo, it is used medicinally for boils and taken internally when a spider was swallowed. The Kayenta Navajo use it as a cathartic, for insect bites, as a sudorific, as an emetic, for stomach cramps, and as a general panacea. The Ramah Navajo use it as a lotion for sores or sore mouth and to bathe perspiring feet.

The Keres mix ground roots of the plant with corn flour, and eat to gain weight. They also use this mixture to keep from becoming greedy, and they make ceremonial necklaces from the plant.

The Ute use as a roots and flowers for stomach and bowel troubles, whereas the Zuni use the fresh flowers alone for stomachaches. The Acoma and the Laguna mix the ground roots with cornmeal and eat the mixture as food.
