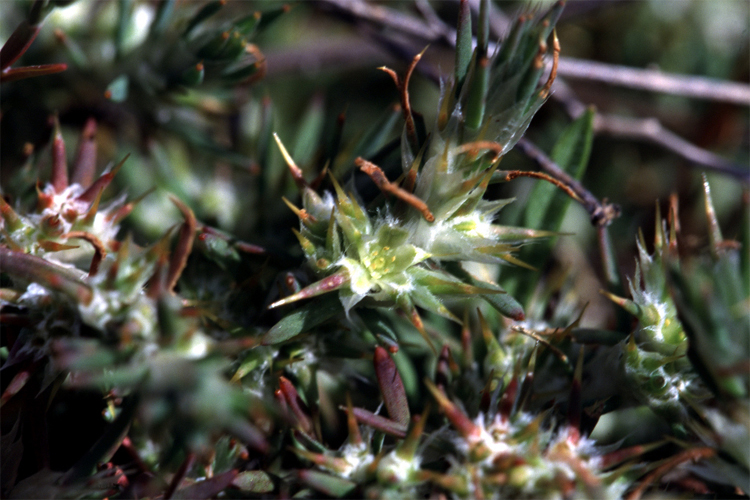

Conservation status
- Secure (NatureServe)

Scientific classification
- Kingdom: Plantae
- Clade: Tracheophytes
- Clade: Angiosperms
- Clade: Eudicots
- Order: Caryophyllales
- Family: Caryophyllaceae
- Genus: Cardionema
- Species: C. ramosissimum

Binomial name
- Cardionema ramosissimum (Weinm.) A. Nels. & J.F. Macbr.

Synonyms
- Homotypic synonyms: Acanthonychia ramosissima (Weinm.) Rohrb. 1872; Loeflingia ramosissima Weinm. 1820 (basionym); Paronychia ramosissima (Weinm.) DC. 1828; Pentacaena ramosissima (Weinm.) Hook. & Arn. 1833; Heterotypic synonyms: Polycnemum bonariense Willd. 1820; Polycnemum scleranthoides Willd. ex Moq. 1849; Acanthonychia polycnemoides (Bartl.) Rohrb. 1872; Acanthonychia ramosissima var. andina (Phil.) Reiche 1895; Cardionema multicaule DC. 1828; Paronychia confertissima D.Parodi 1878; Paronychia pauciflora Larrañaga 1923; Paronychia polycnemoides Schltdl. 1839; Pentacaena polycnemoides Bartl. 1831; Pentacaena tenuior Steud. 1841 nom. inval.

= Cardionema ramosissimum =

Species of flowering plant

Cardionema ramosissimum is a perennial plant in the family Caryophyllaceae, commonly known as sandcarpet, sandmat or tread lightly. It is a small, clumping, mat-forming plant found in a number of diverse habitats throughout its range, from sandy beaches and dunes to the high elevations of the Andes mountains. Cardionema ramosissimum has a disjunct distribution throughout the Americas, and is found on the Pacific coast of North America from Puget Sound to Baja California, in central Mexico, and widely across South America, from the Andes in Colombia to most of Argentina.

== Description ==
Cardionema ramosissimum is a prostrate perennial herb with stems 5–30 cm (2.0–11.8 in) long forming dense mats, with a pubescent indumentum throughout. The stems are often obscured by numerous stipules measuring 4–8 mm (0.16–0.31 in) long that occupy the spaces between the leaves. The leaves are needle-like and finely spine-tipped, 5–13 mm (0.20–0.51 in) long and glabrous.

The inconspicuous inflorescence consists of an axillary cyme of 1 to 5 flowers. The flowers are densely hairy throughout and have a small cup-shaped hypanthium. The 5 sepals are characterized by awns 1.5–4 mm (0.059–0.157 in) long. The fruit is a small, narrowly ovate utricle measuring 1.4–1.6 mm (0.055–0.063 in) long. The sepals become a tough, burlike structure enclosing the utricle to aid it in dispersion.

Uses

This thick plant forms a blanket on the sand and can be used for erosion control on beaches.

== Distribution and habitat ==
Cardionema ramosissimum is found on both continents of the Americas, but in a disjunct distribution, nearing an amphitropical distribution but not technically qualifying as such since it reaches the tropics in the Andes.

In its North American area, C. ramosissimum is found along the coast from Puget Sound in Washington south through Oregon and California into Baja California as far south as San Quintín. It is generally found immediately by the coast, and sometimes occasionally inland on hills and dunes. It is also thought to be introduced on southern Vancouver Island in British Columbia.

Cardionema ramosissimum is also found throughout central Mexico. It is present in the states of Aguascalientes, Guanajuato, Hidalgo, Jalisco, Mexico, Oaxaca, Puebla, San Luis Potosi, Tlaxcala, Veracruz, and Mexico City.

In Colombia, this species is found at elevations of 2,600–3,125 m (8,530–10,250 ft) in the Andes of Boyacá and Cundinamarca departments. In the Andes of Ecuador, it is found at elevations of 2,000–4,500 m (6,560–14,760 ft) in the provinces of Cañar, Chimborazo, Imbabura and Pichincha.

In the Southern Cone of South America, this species is found widely throughout Chile and Argentina, and is also found less commonly in southern Brazil, Uruguay, and Paraguay.

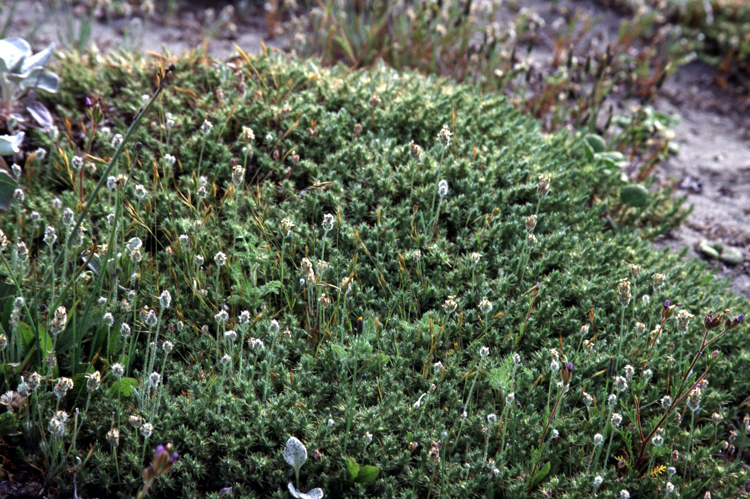
Plant's thick form.
