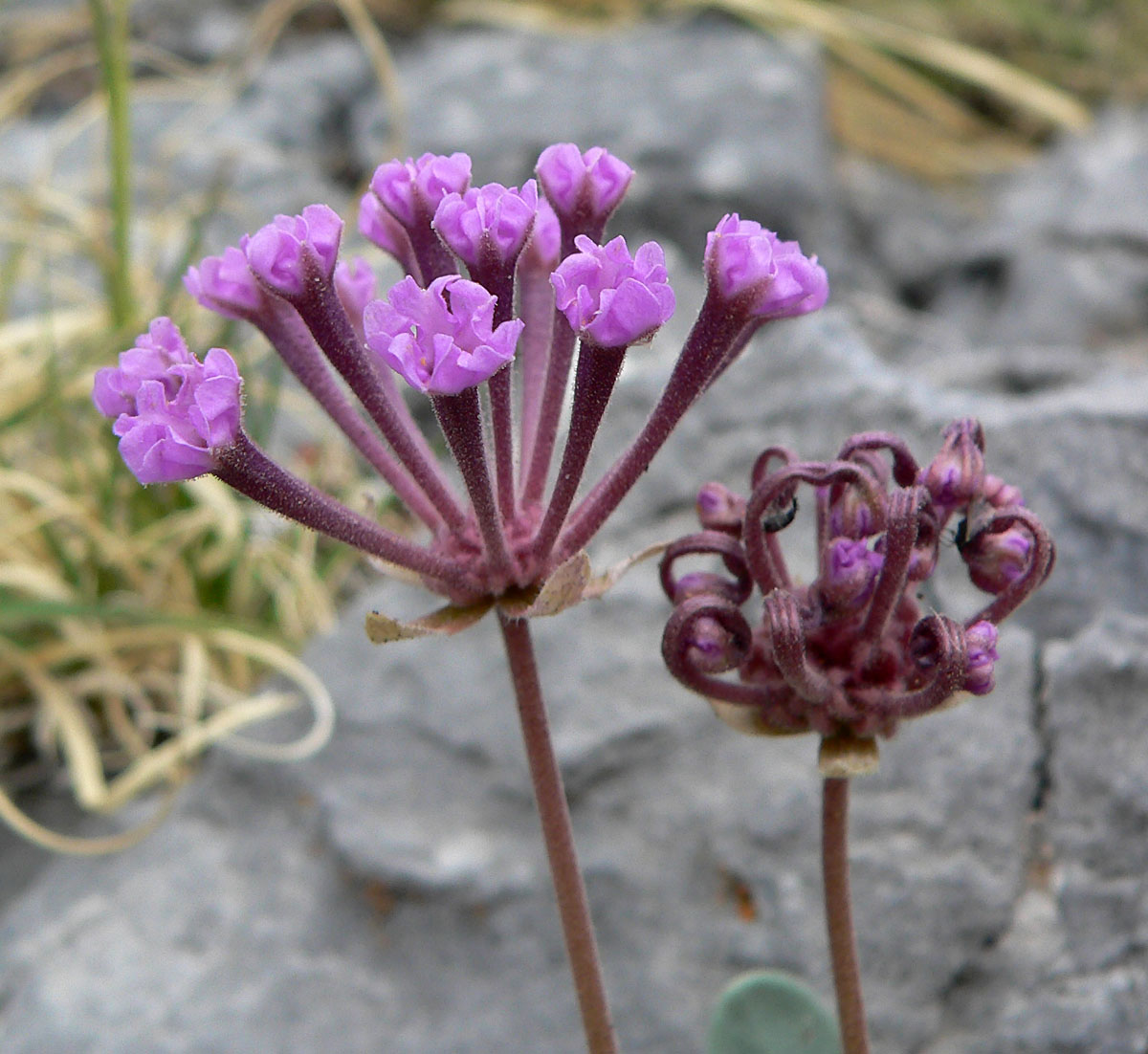
- Abronia nana flowers

Conservation status
- Apparently Secure (NatureServe)

Scientific classification
- Kingdom: Plantae
- Clade: Tracheophytes
- Clade: Angiosperms
- Clade: Eudicots
- Order: Caryophyllales
- Family: Nyctaginaceae
- Genus: Abronia
- Species: A. nana

Binomial name
- Abronia nana S.Watson

Varieties
- A. n. var. covillei; A. n. var. nana

Synonyms
- List: Abronia covillei Heimerl; Abronia nana subsp. covillei (Heimerl) Munz; Abronia nana var. lanciformis M.E.Jones

= Abronia nana =

Species of flowering plant

Abronia nana, commonly known as the Dwarf sand verbena, is a perennial herbaceous plant native to the arid regions of western North America, including parts of the Mojave Desert and Great Basin.

== Description ==
Abronia nana is a perennial herbaceous plant. It is found natively in Arizona, Colorado, Nevada, Utah, and California, respective to two of its varieties.

They produce six to twelve compact and spherical flower clusters. Each individual flower are white to pale pink in color and divided at their upper end into five irregular-shaped lobes about half their length. The leaves are either lanceolate,ovate or elliptic.
