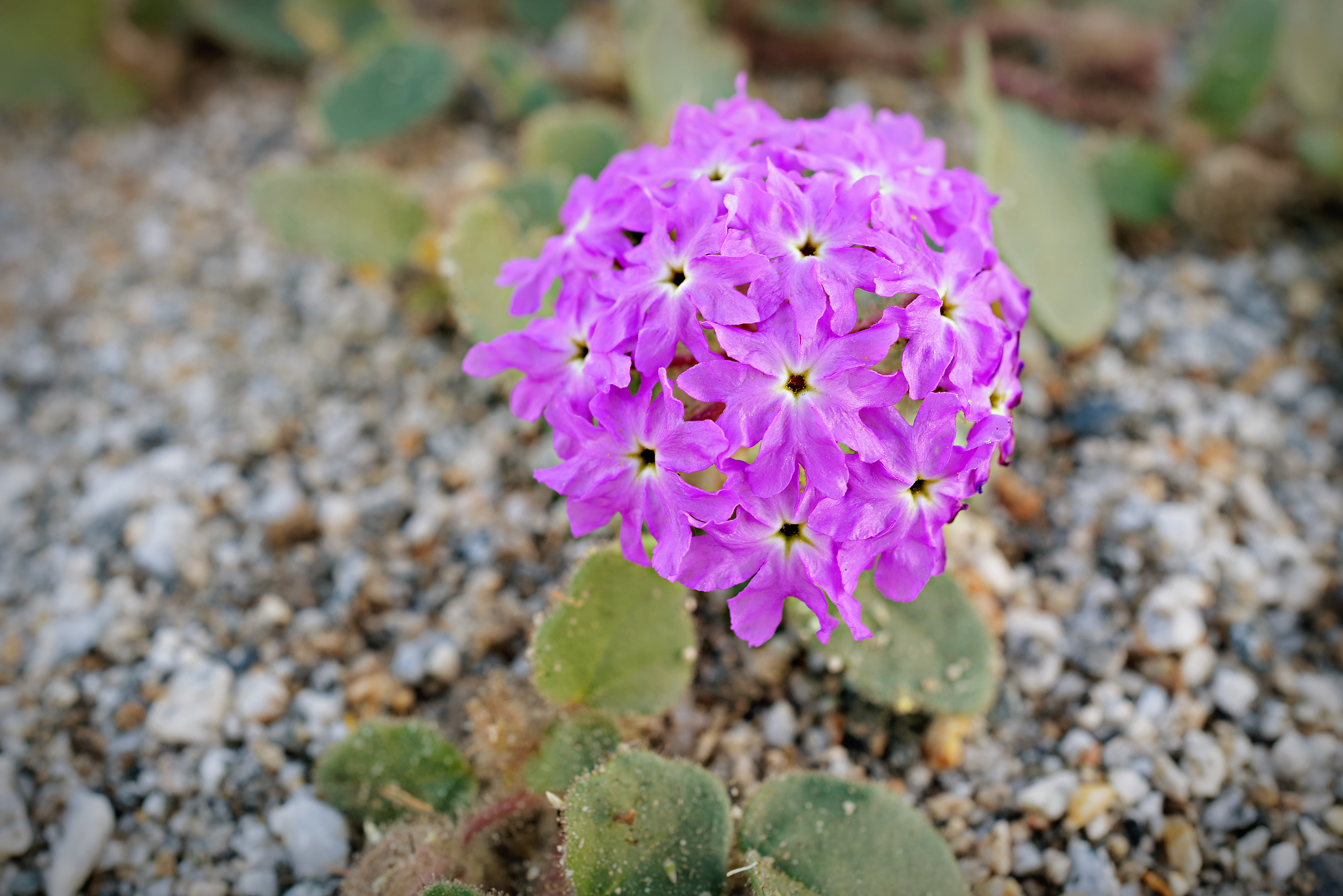

Conservation status
- Secure (NatureServe)

Scientific classification
- Kingdom: Plantae
- Clade: Tracheophytes
- Clade: Angiosperms
- Clade: Eudicots
- Order: Caryophyllales
- Family: Nyctaginaceae
- Genus: Abronia
- Species: A. villosa

Binomial name
- Abronia villosa S.Watson

Varieties
- A. villosa var. aurita (Abrams) Jeps.; A. villosa var. villosa

= Abronia villosa =

Plant species in the four o'clock family

Abronia villosa is a species of sand-verbena known by the common names desert sand-verbena and chaparral sand-verbena. It is in the four o'clock plant family (Nyctaginaceae). It is native to sandy areas in the deserts of the southwestern United States and northern Mexico, associated with creosote-bush and coastal-sage scrub habitats.

== Description ==
Abronia villosa is a short, hairy annual wildflower which grows in creeping prostrate masses along the ground. It has oval-shaped dull green leaves and many peduncles bearing rounded inflorescences of bright magenta or purplish-pink flowers. It grows in the sand of the deserts and coastlines. It has a very sweet fragrance, and is also very sticky. The species typically grows between February and May.

== Subspecies ==
- Abronia villosa var. aurita (Abrams) Jeps.

== Etymology ==
Abronia refers to the term "Abros", which is Greek for "graceful or delicate", while villosa means "hairy".

== Conservation ==
As of December 2024, the conservation group NatureServe listed Abronia villlosa as Secure (G5) worldwide. This status was last reviewed on 29 July 1988. At the state level, the species is listed as No Status Rank (not assessed) throughout its range except in Utah, where it is assessed as Critically Imperiled (S1).

== Chemistry ==
The rotenoids abronione and boeravinone C, and the terpenoid lupeol can be found in A. villosa.
