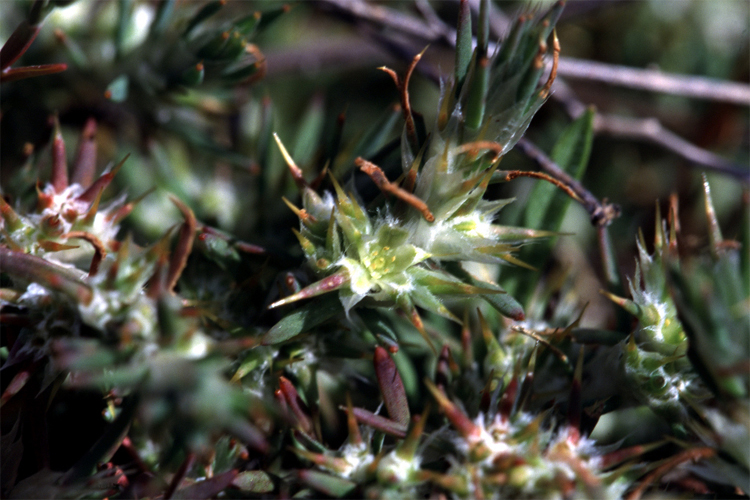
- Cardionema ramosissimum

Scientific classification
- Kingdom: Plantae
- Clade: Tracheophytes
- Clade: Angiosperms
- Clade: Eudicots
- Order: Caryophyllales
- Family: Caryophyllaceae
- Genus: Cardionema; DC.

= Cardionema =

Genus of flowering plants

Cardionema is a genus of flowering plants belonging to the family Caryophyllaceae.

Its native range is Western North America to Chile.

Species:

- Cardionema andina (Phil.) A.Nelson & J.F.Macbr.
- Cardionema burkartii Subils
- Cardionema camphorosmoides (Cambess.) A.Nelson & J.F.Macbr.
- Cardionema congesta (Benth.) A.Nelson & J.F.Macbr.
- Cardionema kurtzii Subils
- Cardionema ramosissima (Weinm.) A.Nelson & J.F.Macbr.
