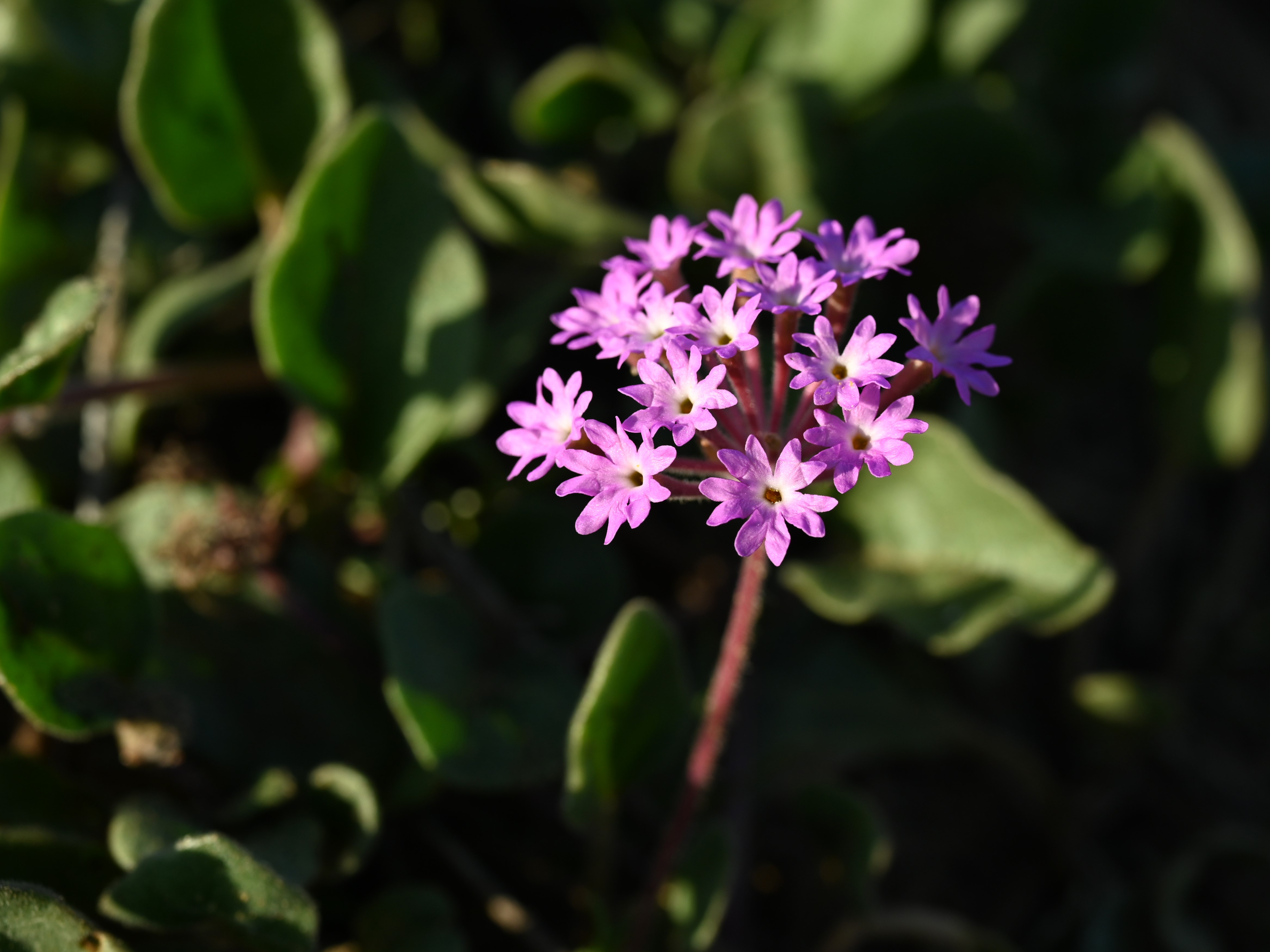

Scientific classification
- Kingdom: Plantae
- Clade: Embryophytes
- Clade: Tracheophytes
- Clade: Spermatophytes
- Clade: Angiosperms
- Clade: Eudicots
- Order: Caryophyllales
- Family: Nyctaginaceae
- Genus: Abronia
- Species: A. umbellata

Binomial name
- Abronia umbellata Lam. 1793

Synonyms
- List: Abronia californica Raeusch.; Abronia glauca Menzies ex Hook.; Abronia rosea Hartw. ex Loudon; Abronia rotundifolia C.F.Gaertn.; Tricratus admirabilis L'Hér. ex Willd.; Tricratus admirabilis Pritz.; Abronia acutalata Standl.; Abronia breviflora Standl.

= Abronia umbellata =

Species of flowering plant

Abronia umbellata (pink sand verbena) is a flowering annual plant which is native to western North America. Other common names include beach sand verbena and purple sand verbena.

== Distribution and habitat ==
This plant is generally found in sandy, well-drained soil in areas with low precipitation, it can become a striking carpet-like groundcover in undisturbed areas after winter rains. Pink sand verbena tolerates seaside conditions and is found on the west coast of North America from British Columbia, Canada to Baja California, Mexico. Sand verbena is typically found on beaches and sand dunes, below the coastal sage scrub, blooming throughout most of the year. It is listed as endangered by the State of Oregon.

== Description ==
Abronia umbellata is a prostrate annual with thick, succulent leaves (leaves occur few to many and are slender, ovate to diamond-shape with stems as long as leaf blades, stems are often hairy) and pink to purple colored flowers with white centers. Flowers occur in clusters subtended by 5-8 lanceolate bracts. The flowers do not have petals, but the calyx lobes are cleft giving the appearance of 10-16 petals. The limbs of the perianth is bright colored sometimes to purplish magenta and the tube can be green or red but always-glandular pubescent. The tube includes one pistil and three stamens.

A. umbellata frequently hybridizes with other species of Abronia, including A. maritima. Its flower is fragrant at night and attracts moths. The foliage can be deciduous based on environmental stress. This plant is sometimes used in California in native plant gardening.

== Subspecies ==
- Abronia umbellata acutalata (Standl.) C.L.Hitchc.
- Abronia umbellata breviflora (Standl.) Munz

== History in Europe ==
Originally described in 1793 by the French botanist Jean-Baptiste Lamarck, Abronia umbellata was collected in 1786 from Monterey, California by the gardener Jean Nicolas Collignon of the French La Pérouse expedition, which had stopped at the capital of Alta California as part of a journey of scientific exploration spanning the Pacific Ocean. While Collignon and his shipmates perished in a wreck near Vanikoro in the Solomon Islands, some of his collection had previously been shipped back to France during a stop at the Portuguese-held Macao, including the seeds of A. umbellata. They were planted at the Jardin des Plantes in Paris, and Lamarck eventually named their descendants A. umbellata, making this species the first Californian flower that does not occur outside of western North America that was described in the scientific fashion of Linnaeus.
