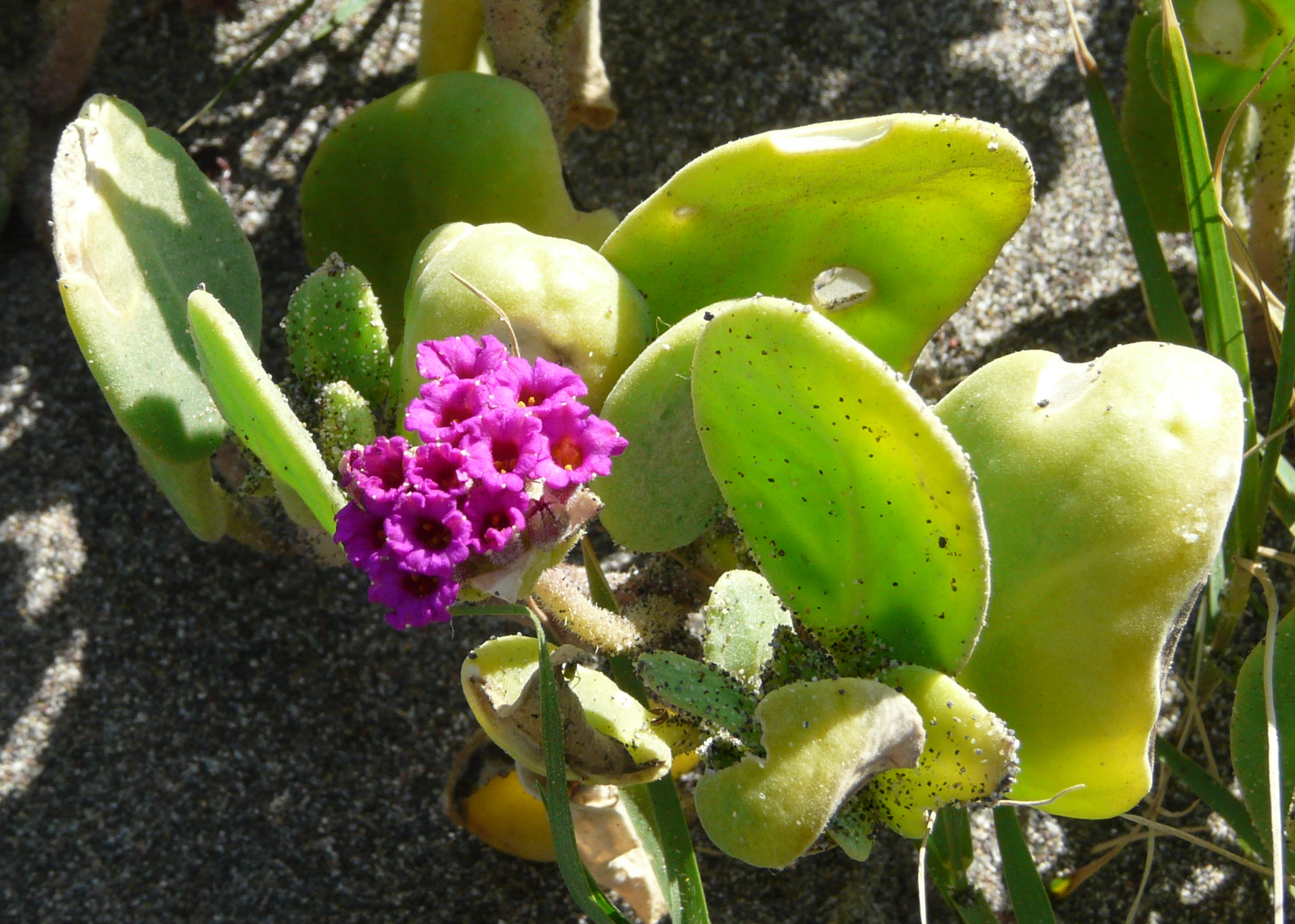

Conservation status
- Apparently Secure (NatureServe)

Scientific classification
- Kingdom: Plantae
- Clade: Tracheophytes
- Clade: Angiosperms
- Clade: Eudicots
- Order: Caryophyllales
- Family: Nyctaginaceae
- Genus: Abronia
- Species: A. maritima

Binomial name
- Abronia maritima Nutt. ex S. Wats.

= Abronia maritima =

Species of flowering plant

Abronia maritima is a species of sand verbena known by the common name red sand verbena. This is a beach-adapted perennial plant native to the coastlines of southern California, including the Channel Islands, and northern Baja California. It grows along stable sand dunes near, but not in, the ocean surf.

This halophyte requires saline water which it receives mostly in the form of sea spray, and cannot tolerate fresh water or prolonged dry conditions. Its succulent tissues are adapted to isolate and store salt.

This sand verbena forms a green mat along the ground, its stems sometimes buried under loose sand. It flowers year-round in bright red to pink or purplish clusters of flowers. The mats are thick and provide shelter for a variety of small beach-dwelling animals. This is a rare plant. Its habitat is located in heavily traveled beach areas, where it is disturbed by human activity.
