= List of Boerhavia species =

As of November 2024, the following 105 species were accepted in the genus Boerhavia:

== A ==
- Boerhavia acutifolia (Choisy) J.W.Moore
- Boerhavia africana Lour.
- Boerhavia alamasona Rose
- Boerhavia alata S.Watson
- Boerhavia albiflora Fosberg
- Boerhavia ambigua (Meikle) Govaerts
- Boerhavia angustifolia L.
- Boerhavia anisophylla Torr.
- Boerhavia arabica (Meikle) Govaerts
- Boerhavia australis (Meikle) Govaerts

== B ==
- Boerhavia boissieri Heimerl
- Boerhavia bracteosa S.Watson
- Boerhavia brandegeei (Standl.) Govaerts
- Boerhavia burbidgeana Hewson

== C ==
- Boerhavia capitata Heimerl
- Boerhavia chinensis (L.) Rottb.
- Boerhavia chrysantha Barneby
- Boerhavia ciliata Brandegee
- Boerhavia coccinea Mill.
- Boerhavia cordobensis Kuntze ex Heimerl
- Boerhavia coulteri (Hook.f.) S.Watson
- Boerhavia crassifolia (Heimerl) Govaerts
- Boerhavia crispa B.Heyne
- Boerhavia crispifolia Fosberg

== D ==
- Boerhavia decipiens (Meikle) Govaerts
- Boerhavia deserticola Codd
- Boerhavia diandra L.
- Boerhavia dichotoma Hochst. ex Walp.
- Boerhavia diffusa L.
- Boerhavia discolor Kunth

== E ==
- Boerhavia elegans Choisy
- Boerhavia erecta L.

== F ==
- Boerhavia fallacissima Heimerl ex Schinz
- Boerhavia fistulosa Fosberg

== G ==
- Boerhavia gardneri Hewson
- Boerhavia glabrata Blume
- Boerhavia glandulosa Andersson
- Boerhavia gracillima Heimerl
- Boerhavia graminicola Berhaut
- Boerhavia grandiflora A.Rich.
- Boerhavia greenwayi (Meikle) Govaerts

== H ==
- Boerhavia heimerlii Vierh.
- Boerhavia helenae Roem. & Schult.
- Boerhavia herbstii Fosberg
- Boerhavia hereroensis Heimerl
- Boerhavia heronensis Govaerts
- Boerhavia hiranensis (Thulin) Govaerts
- Boerhavia hirsuta L.
- Boerhavia hitchcockii Standl.
- Boerhavia hualienense S.H.Chen & M.J.Wu
- Boerhavia hualienensis Shih H.Chen & M.J.Wu

== L ==
- Boerhavia lantsangensis (D.Q.Lu) Govaerts
- Boerhavia lateriflora Standl.
- Boerhavia libyca Pomel
- Boerhavia linearifolia A.Gray
- Boerhavia litoralis Kunth

== M ==
- Boerhavia maculata Standl.
- Boerhavia megaptera Standl.
- Boerhavia mista (Thulin) Govaerts
- Boerhavia montana (Miré, H.Gillet & Quézel) Govaerts
- Boerhavia mutabilis R.Br.

== O ==
- Boerhavia octandra S.Watson
- Boerhavia organensis Standl.

== P ==
- Boerhavia paludosa (Domin) Meikle
- Boerhavia parviflora (Thulin) Govaerts
- Boerhavia patula Domb. ex Vahl
- Boerhavia pedunculosa A.Rich.
- Boerhavia pentandra Burch.
- Boerhavia periplocifolia Comm. ex Vahl
- Boerhavia pilosa (Heimerl) Govaerts
- Boerhavia plicata Bojer & Bojer
- Boerhavia plumbaginea Cav.
- Boerhavia procumbens Banks ex Roxb.
- Boerhavia pulchella Griseb.
- Boerhavia punarnava Saha & Krishnam.
- Boerhavia purpurascens A.Gray

== R ==
- Boerhavia ramosissima (Thulin) Govaerts
- Boerhavia raynalii (J.-P.Lebrun & Meikle) Govaerts
- Boerhavia reniformis Chiov.
- Boerhavia repens L.
- Boerhavia repleta Hewson
- Boerhavia rosei Standl.
- Boerhavia rufopilosa Kuntze

== S ==
- Boerhavia scandens L.
- Boerhavia schinzii Heimerl ex Schinz
- Boerhavia schomburgkiana Oliv.
- Boerhavia simonyi Heimerl & Vierh. ex Vierh.
- Boerhavia sinuata (Meikle) Greuter & Burdet
- Boerhavia sonorae Rose
- Boerhavia spicata Choisy
- Boerhavia squarrosa Heimerl
- Boerhavia stellata Bojer & Bojer
- Boerhavia stenocarpa Chiov.

== T ==
- Boerhavia tarapacana Phil.
- Boerhavia tetrandra G.Forst.
- Boerhavia transvaalensis Gand.
- Boerhavia traubae Spellenb.
- Boerhavia triquetra S.Watson
- Boerhavia tsarisbergensis Govaerts
- Boerhavia tuberosa Lam.

== V ==
- Boerhavia verbenacea Killip
- Boerhavia virgata Kunth

== W ==
- Boerhavia weberbaueri Heimerl
- Boerhavia wrightii A.Gray

== X ==
- Boerhavia xantii S.Watson
