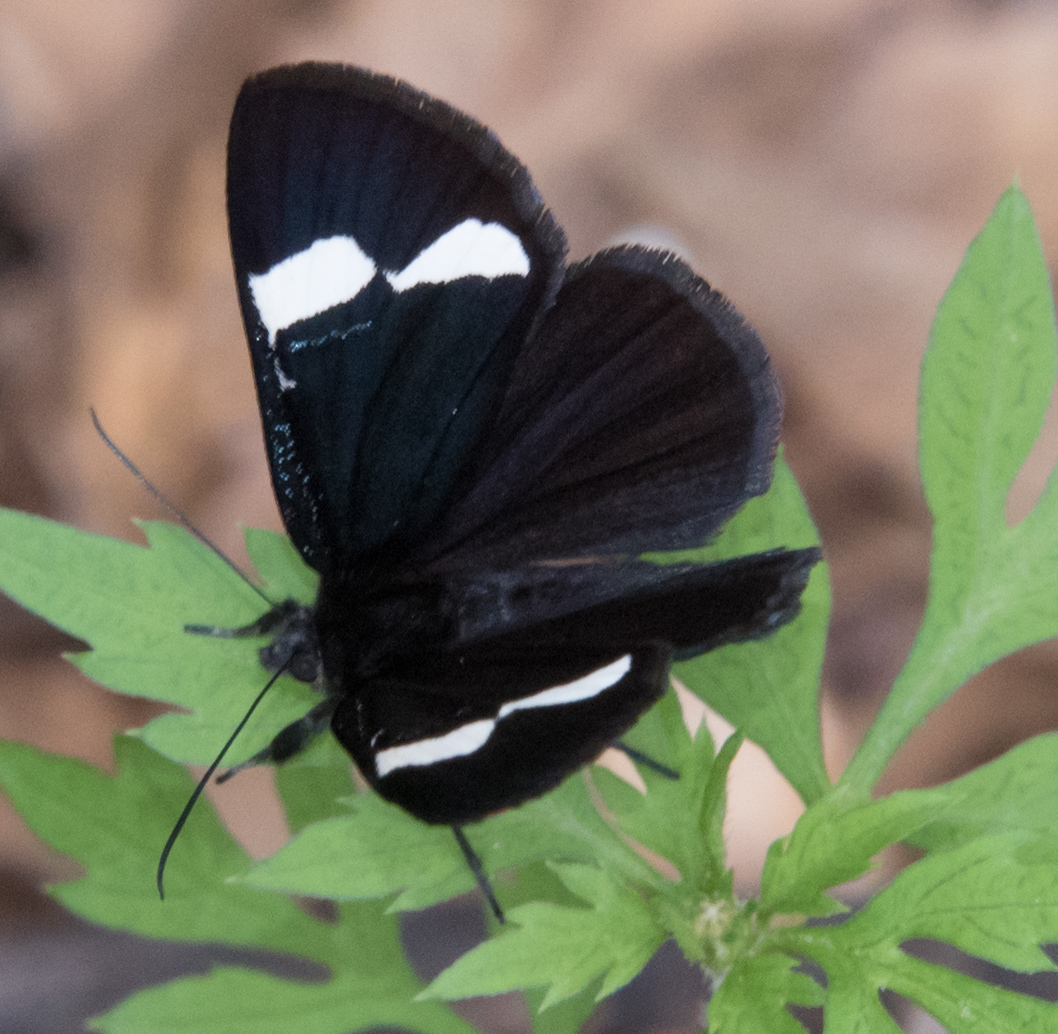
- A. geronimo adult female

Scientific classification
- Kingdom: Animalia
- Phylum: Arthropoda
- Clade: Pancrustacea
- Class: Insecta
- Order: Lepidoptera
- Superfamily: Noctuoidea
- Family: Noctuidae
- Genus: Alypiodes
- Species: A. geronimo

Binomial name
- Alypiodes geronimo (Barnes, 1900)

= Alypiodes geronimo =

Geronimo Forester

Species of moth

Alypiodes geronimo is a moth in the family Noctuidae (the owlet moths). first described by William Barnes in 1900. It is found in North America and parts of Mexico.

The MONA or Hodges number for Alypiodes geronimo is 9313.

== Description ==
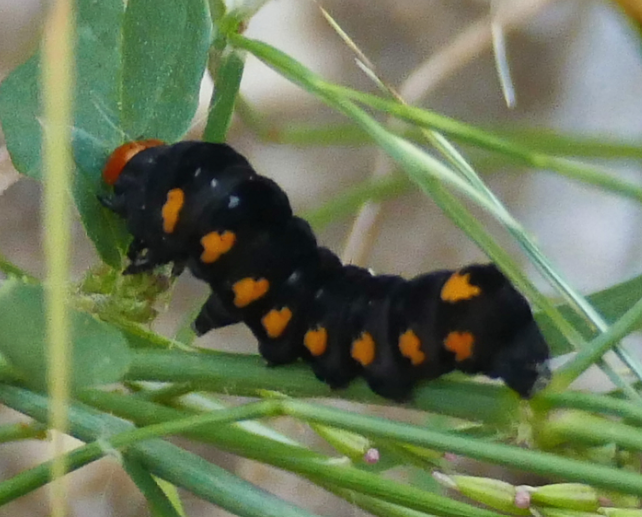
A. geronimo larval stage

The species is sexually dimorphic, unlike Alypiodes bimaculata, females have two spots on their forewing, while males have a third extra spot.

Caterpillars feed on the leaves of Boerhavia species.
