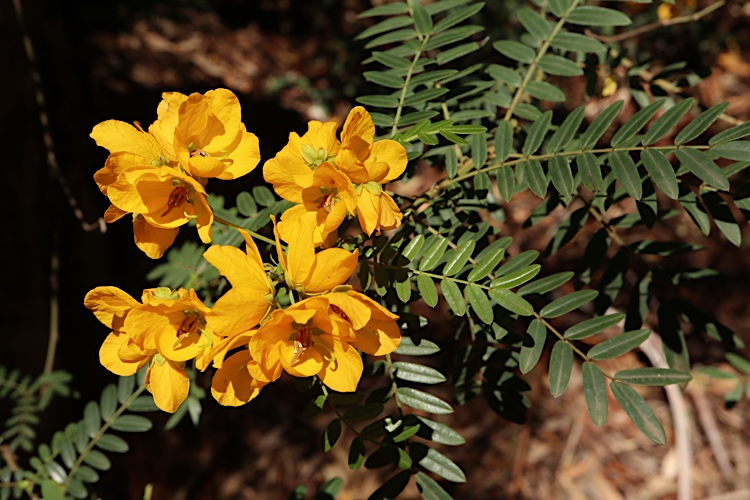
- In the Australian National Botanic Gardens

Scientific classification
- Kingdom: Plantae
- Clade: Tracheophytes
- Clade: Angiosperms
- Clade: Eudicots
- Clade: Rosids
- Order: Fabales
- Family: Fabaceae
- Subfamily: Caesalpinioideae
- Genus: Senna
- Species: S. barronfieldii

Binomial name
- Senna barronfieldii (Colla) Hewson

Synonyms
- Cassia australis Sims; Cassia australis Sims var. australis; Cassia australis var. pedunculata Benth.; Cassia barrenfieldii Colla orth. var.; Cassia barronfieldii Colla; Cassia odorata R.Morris; Cassia riedelii Benth.; Cassia schultesii Colla; Cassia umbellata Rchb.; Senna odorata (R.Morris) Randell

= Senna barronfieldii =

Southern cassia

Species of legume

Senna barronfieldii, commonly known as southern cassia, is a species of flowering plant in the family Fabaceae and is endemic to eastern Australia. It is an erect shrub with more or less glabrous, pinnate leaves with eight to thirteen pairs of lance-shaped or elliptic leaflets, and yellow flowers in groups of three to five.

== Description ==
Senna barronfieldii is an erect shrub that typically grows to a height of up to 2.5 m (8 ft 2 in). Its leaves are pinnate, 80–150 mm (3.1–5.9 in) long on a petiole 6–14 mm (0.24–0.55 in) long, with eight to thirteen pairs of lance-shaped or elliptic leaflets 10–30 mm (0.39–1.18 in) long and 5–10 mm (0.20–0.39 in) wide. There is are several stalked glands between each pair of leaflets. The flowers are yellow and arranged in upper leaf axils in groups of three to five on a peduncle 30–90 mm (1.2–3.5 in) long, each flower on a pedicel 10–20 mm (0.39–0.79 in) long. The petals are 12–20 mm (0.47–0.79 in) long and there are ten fertile stamens, the anthers 4–6 mm (0.16–0.24 in) long. Flowering occurs in spring and summer, and the fruit is a more or less flattened pod 80–120 mm (3.1–4.7 in) long.

== Taxonomy ==
This species was first formally described in 1826 by Luigi Aloysius Colla who gave it the name Cassia barronfieldii in his Hortus Ripulensis. In 2005, Helen Joan Hewson transferred the species to Senna as Senna barronfieldii in the journal Telopea. The specific epithet (barronfieldii) honours Barron Field.

== Distribution and habitat ==
Senna barronfieldii grows in forest, the edges of rainforest and in subtropical rainforest in eastern Queensland and in eastern New South Wales as far south as Bega.
