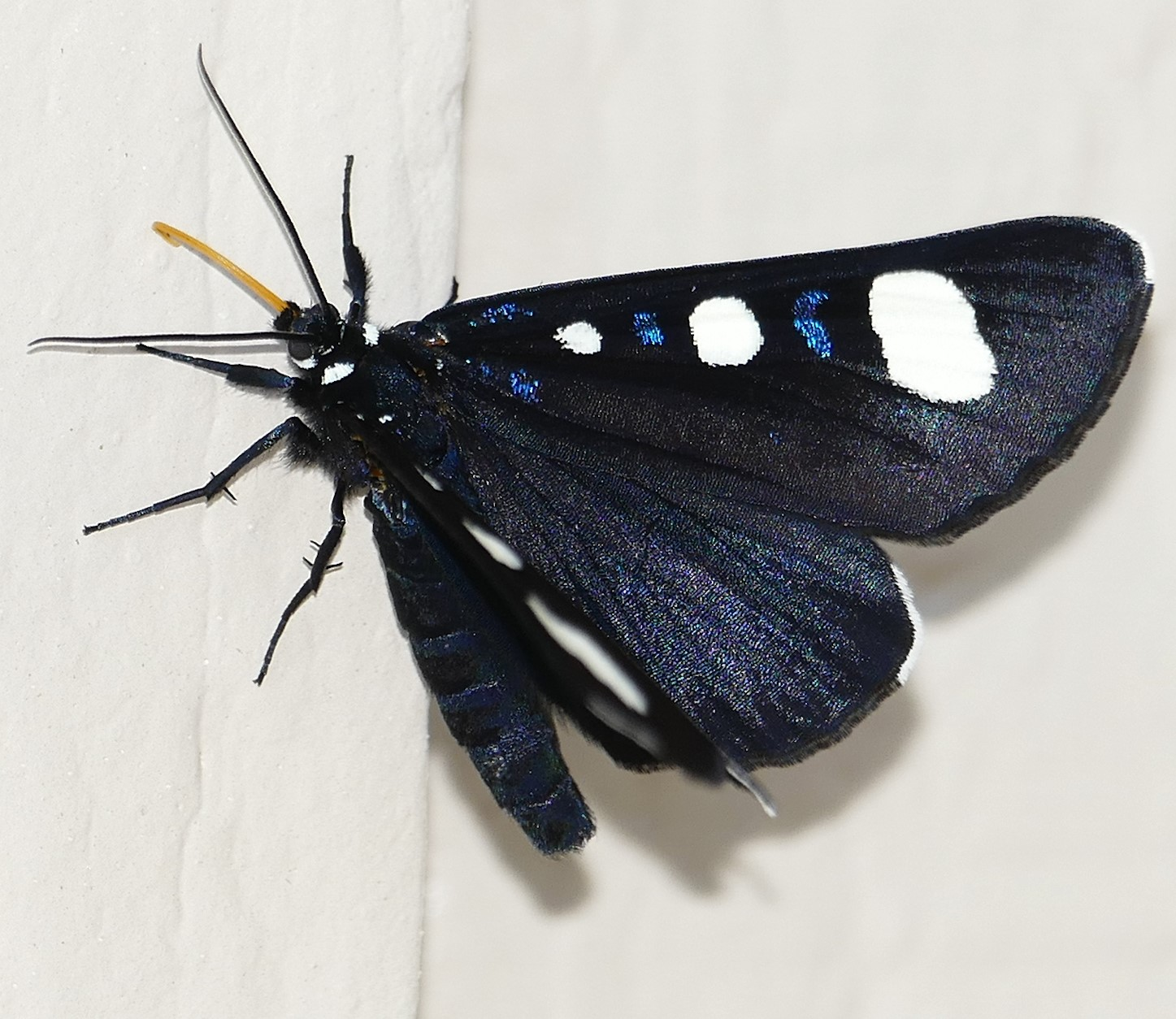

Scientific classification
- Kingdom: Animalia
- Phylum: Arthropoda
- Class: Insecta
- Order: Lepidoptera
- Superfamily: Noctuoidea
- Family: Noctuidae
- Genus: Alypiodes
- Species: A. flavilinguis

Binomial name
- Alypiodes flavilinguis (Grote, 1883)

= Alypiodes flavilinguis =

Species of moth in the family Noctuidae

Alypiodes flavilinguis is a species of moth in the family Noctuidae, first described by Augustus Radcliffe Grote in 1883. Its name has been lifted as a synonymy of Alypiodes bimaculata (Herrich-Schäffer, 1853) in 2021. It can be found in New Mexico, Arizona, and Texas.

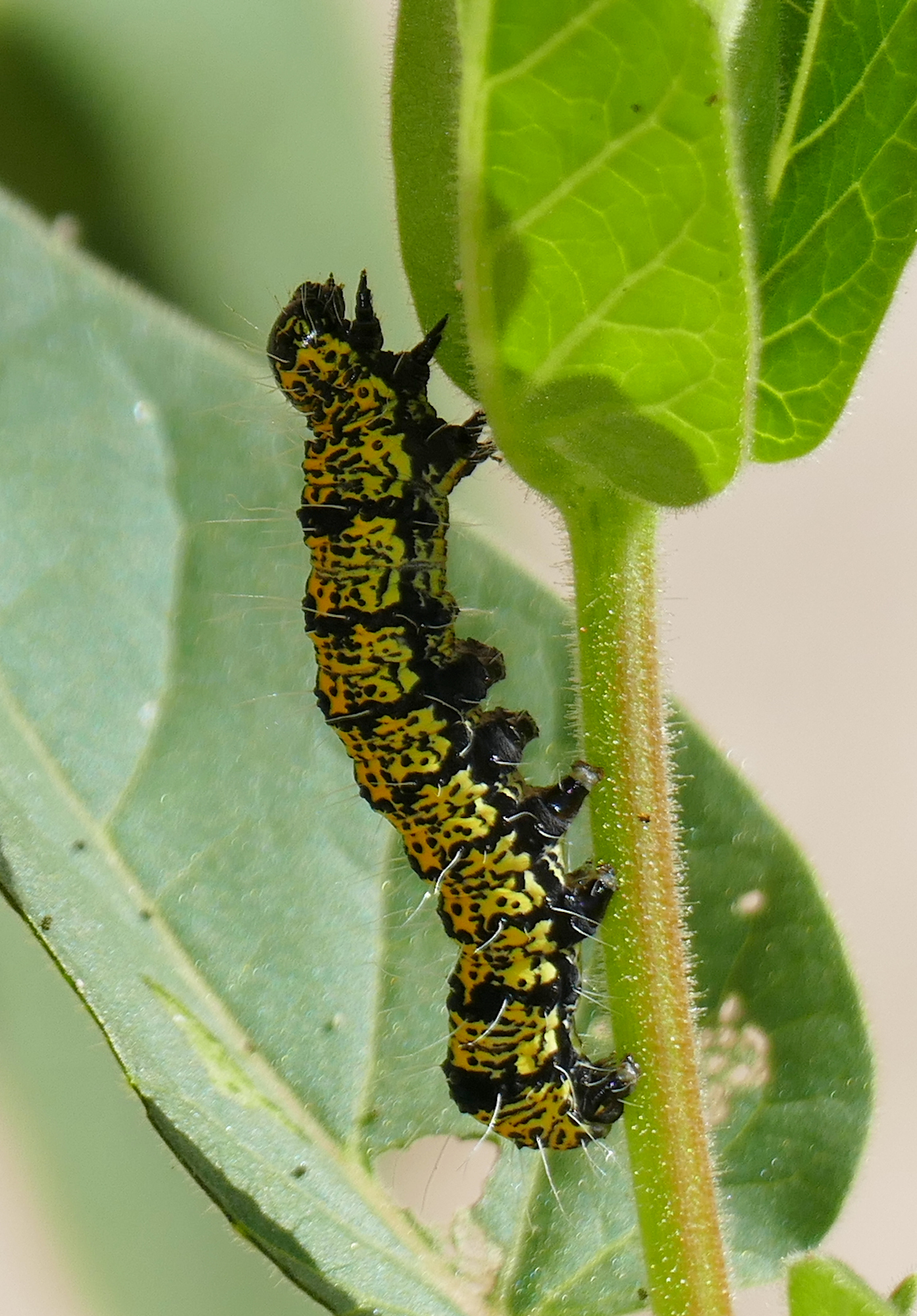
A. flavilinguis larva

== Description ==
Adult A. flavilinguis are around 17 millimetres (0.67 in) in length, and 48 millimetres (1.9 in) in wingspan. Its key feature is the metallic blue patches on its costa. They are an overall black moth with three pale yellow patches on its forewing.
