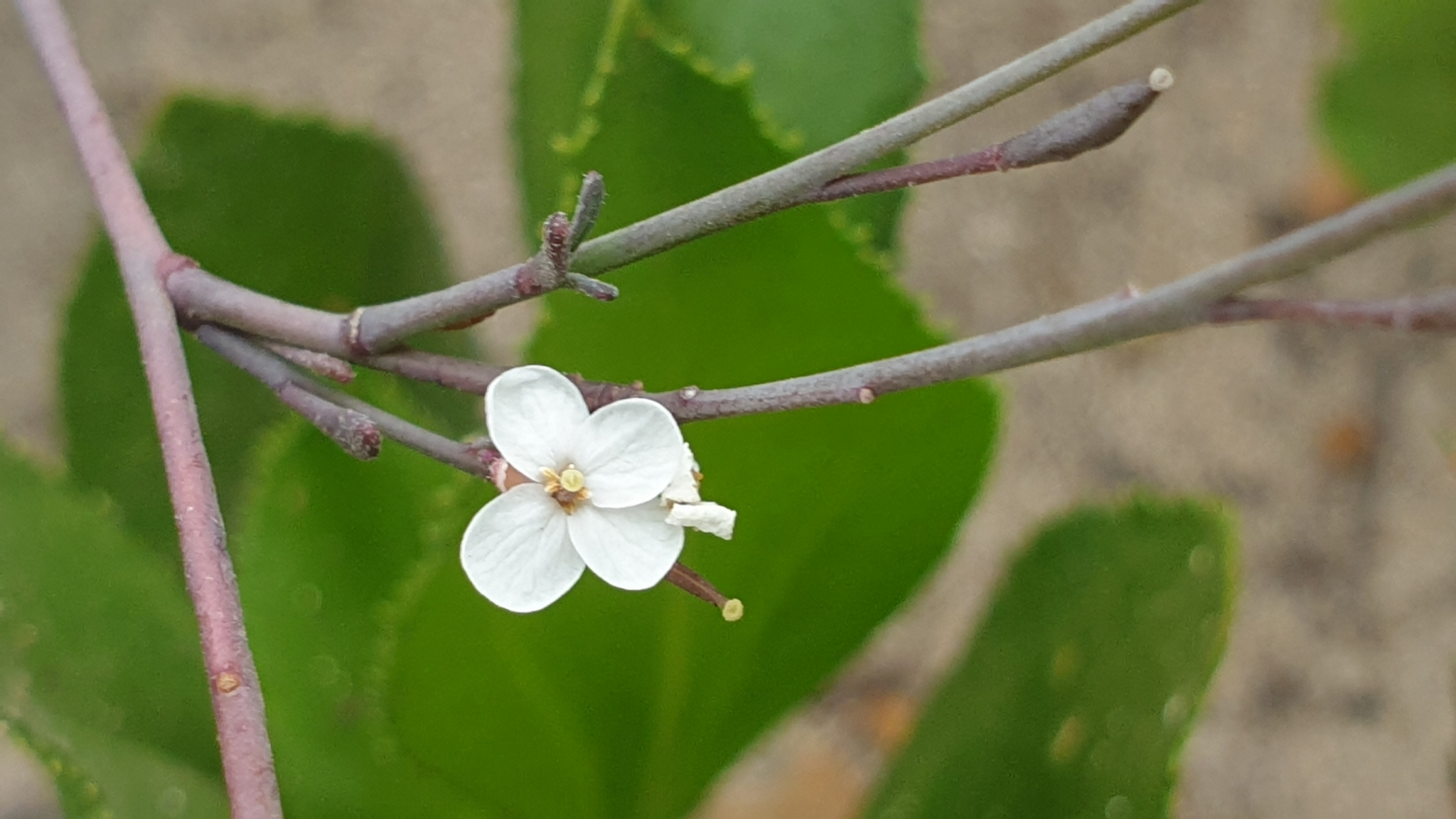
- Irenepharsus phasmatodes

Scientific classification
- Kingdom: Plantae
- Clade: Tracheophytes
- Clade: Angiosperms
- Clade: Eudicots
- Clade: Rosids
- Order: Brassicales
- Family: Brassicaceae
- Genus: Irenepharsus; Hewson

= Irenepharsus =

Genus of plants

Irenepharsus is a genus of flowering plants belonging to the family Brassicaceae. Its native range is south-eastern Australia.

The genus name of Irenepharsus refers to the Greek mythological goddess of Eirene. The genus was circumscribed by Helen Joan Hewson in 1982.

== Known species ==
As accepted by Plants of the World Online;

- Irenepharsus magicus Hewson
- Irenepharsus phasmatodes Hewson
- Irenepharsus trypherus Hewson
