= Spiderling =

Spiderling may refer to:

- an immature spider
- the herbaceous plant genus Boerhavia
