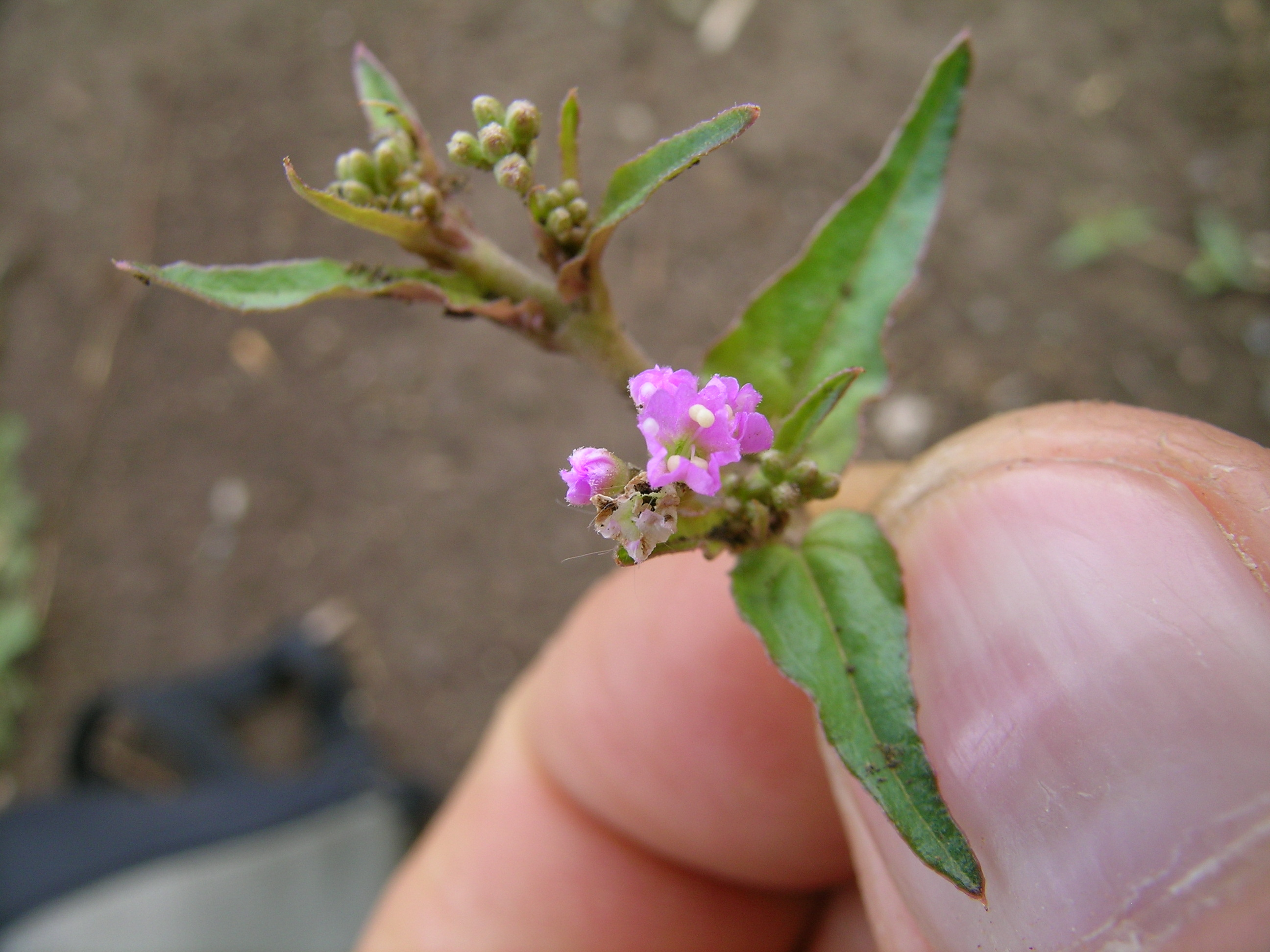

Scientific classification
- Kingdom: Plantae
- Clade: Tracheophytes
- Clade: Angiosperms
- Clade: Eudicots
- Order: Caryophyllales
- Family: Nyctaginaceae
- Genus: Boerhavia
- Species: B. dominii

Binomial name
- Boerhavia dominii Meikle & Hewson

= Boerhavia dominii =

Species of plant

Boerhavia dominii, commonly known as tarvine, is a species of flowering plant in the four o'clock family, Nyctaginaceae. It is native to Australia.

It is a prostrate perennial herb growing up to 1 metre in diameter. Leaves are about 40 mm long and 20 mm wide and may have a wavy edge. It produces pale pink or pale purple flowers followed by small, hairy, furrowed fruits.
