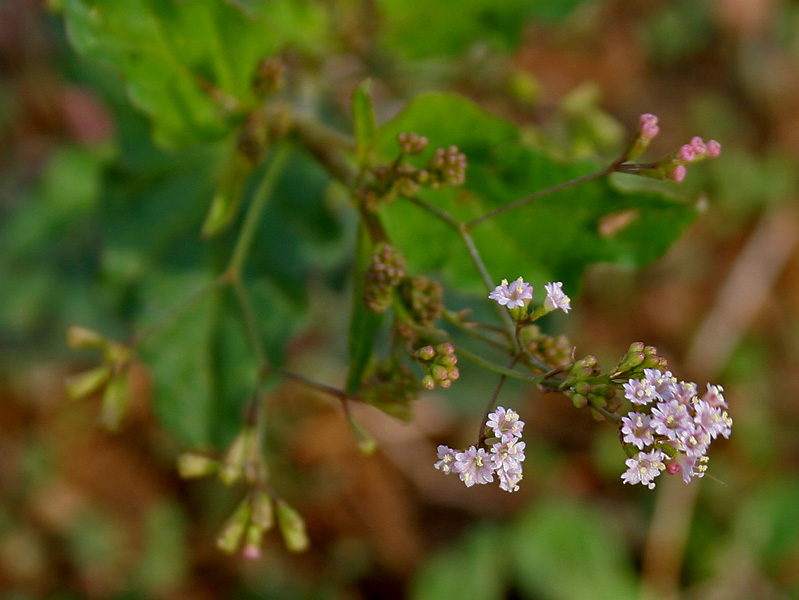

Scientific classification
- Kingdom: Plantae
- Clade: Tracheophytes
- Clade: Angiosperms
- Clade: Eudicots
- Order: Caryophyllales
- Family: Nyctaginaceae
- Genus: Boerhavia
- Species: B. erecta

Binomial name
- Boerhavia erecta L.

= Boerhavia erecta =

Species of flowering plant

Boerhavia erecta, commonly known as the erect spiderling or the erect boerhavia, is one of more than 100 species in the genus Boerhavia. It is native to the United States, Mexico, Central America, Angola and western South America, but now is cosmopolitan in tropical and subtropical regions. In Africa its distribution extends from West Africa, eastwards to Somalia and down to South Africa. It has recently been found in parts of Madagascar and Réunion. In Asia, it occurs in India, Java, Malaysia, the Philippines, China and the Ryukyu Islands.

As an adventive species Boerhavia erecta is not widely regarded as a serious weed or invasive threat; in fact its physical and pharmacological attributes suggest that it is potentially useful.

== Description ==
Boerhavia erecta has a chromosome number 2n=52. It is a perennial herb similar to Boerhavia diffusa, but can be distinguished by the fact that erect spiderlings are straight, bear white and pink flowers and bear obconic, glabrous fruit.

=== Stem ===
Boerhavia erecta plants can survive considerable damage from grazing and fire because their stems produce perennating buds near the ground surface.

Stems of B. erecta typically grow to about 60 centimetres (24 in) tall and 3–5 millimetres (0.12–0.20 in) across. They generally are cylindrical without furrows or ridges. In colour they are green, commonly tinted with purple, and towards their upper regions they are slightly pubescent, being covered in short, soft hairs. The base of the stem however, is glabrous and woody.

=== Leaf ===
The leaves are somewhat fleshy. Their arrangement is opposite and unequal. Typically the leaf size ranges from 1.5–2.5 cm (0.59–0.98 in) long and 2–3.5 cm (0.79–1.38 in) wide to 3–4.5 cm (1.2–1.8 in) long and 2–3.5 cm (0.79–1.38 in) wide, with a petiole of roughly 2 cm (0.79 in) to 3 cm (1.2 in). The petioles of the leaf are pale green with a hint of purple. The blade of the leaf is ovate, ovate- lanceolate or lanceolate. The upper surface of the leaf is green and pubescent, sometimes with scattered glands. The underside is grayish-white, often with tints of purplish red that also appear on the leaf margins.

The flowering season of Boerhavia erecta is from early summer to mid-autumn. The inflorescences are determinatively cymose, meaning that the central, terminate flowers open before the basal flowers. Two leafy bracts subtend each branch of the inflorescence, but detach at an early stage. Each peduncle bears 2–6 sessile flowers at its apex. The flowers are tiny, pink and cream. The corolla is bell-shaped, 5-petalled, 1.5 mm long and 2 mm wide. There are 2–3 stamens. Anthocarps (false fruits) are circular and flat. They are 5-ribbed (0.3–0.5 mm wide) and glabrous. The ripe fruits of this plant are sticky and adapted to dispersal by humans and animals.

== Uses ==
Boerhavia erecta is used in traditional medicine and as a food. In West and East Africa, the leaves are eaten as a vegetable and in sauces. In the Sahel, cattle graze on its leaves.

== Invasiveness ==
B. erecta readily invades various environments such as bush, wasteland, agricultural land, and roadsides. Although the species is highly adventive, it is not regarded as a major invasive hazard. The International Union for Conservation of Nature is working with countries such as Bangladesh to encourage the species, and its pharmacology is under study.
