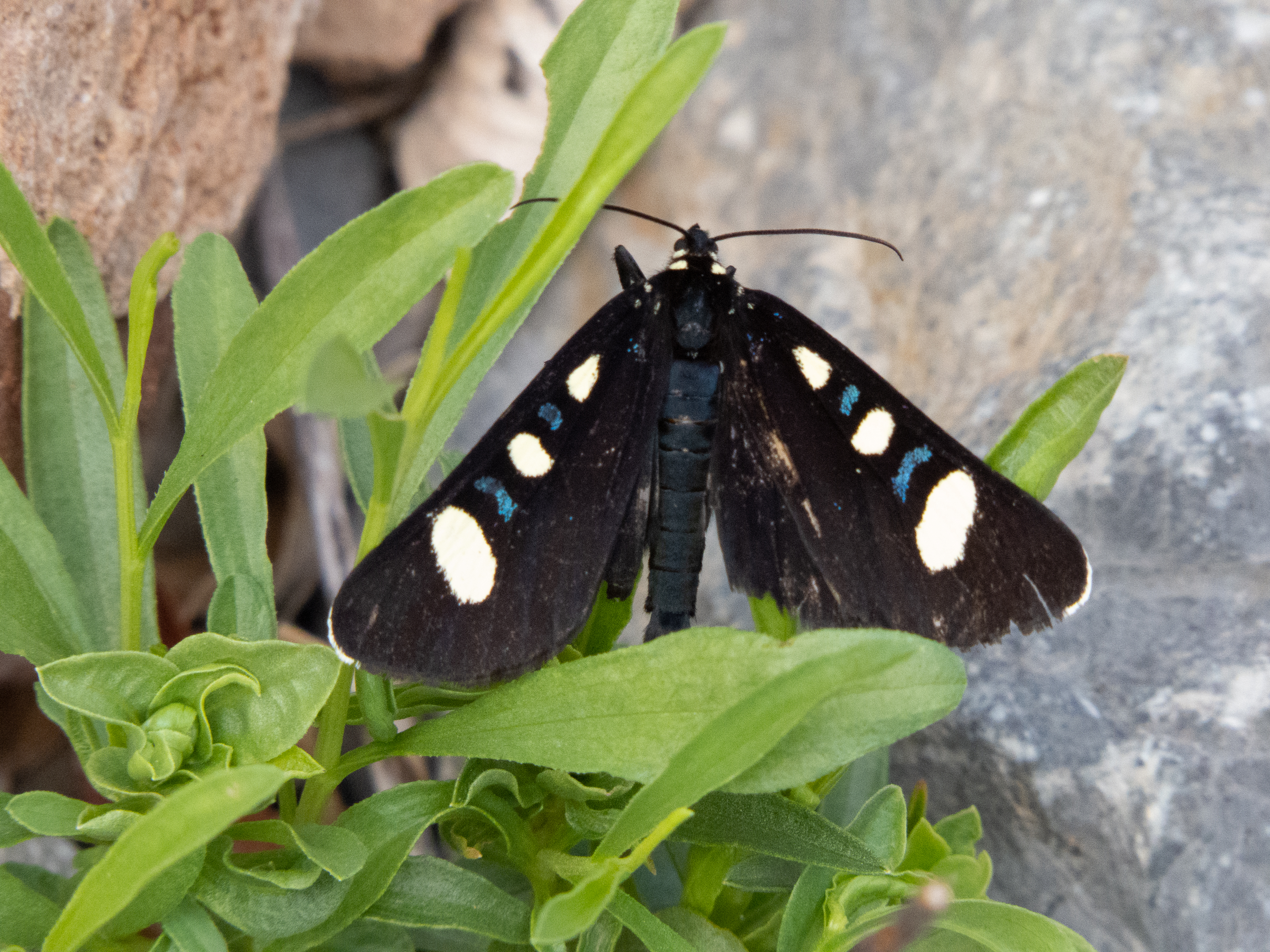
- Alypiodes bimaculata

Scientific classification
- Kingdom: Animalia
- Phylum: Arthropoda
- Class: Insecta
- Order: Lepidoptera
- Superfamily: Noctuoidea
- Family: Noctuidae
- Subfamily: Agaristinae
- Genus: Alypiodes (Grote, 1883)

= Alypiodes =

Genus of moths

Alypiodes is a genus of moths of the family Noctuidae. Moths in this genus are commonly called forester moths.

== Species ==
- Alypiodes bimaculata (Herrich-Schäffer, 1853), Two-spotted forester moth
- Alypiodes flavilinguis (Grote, 1883)
- Alypiodes geronimo (Barnes, 1900), Geronimo forester
- Alypiodes radians (Felder, 1874), Radiant Moth
- Alypiodes walkeri (Druce, 1888)
