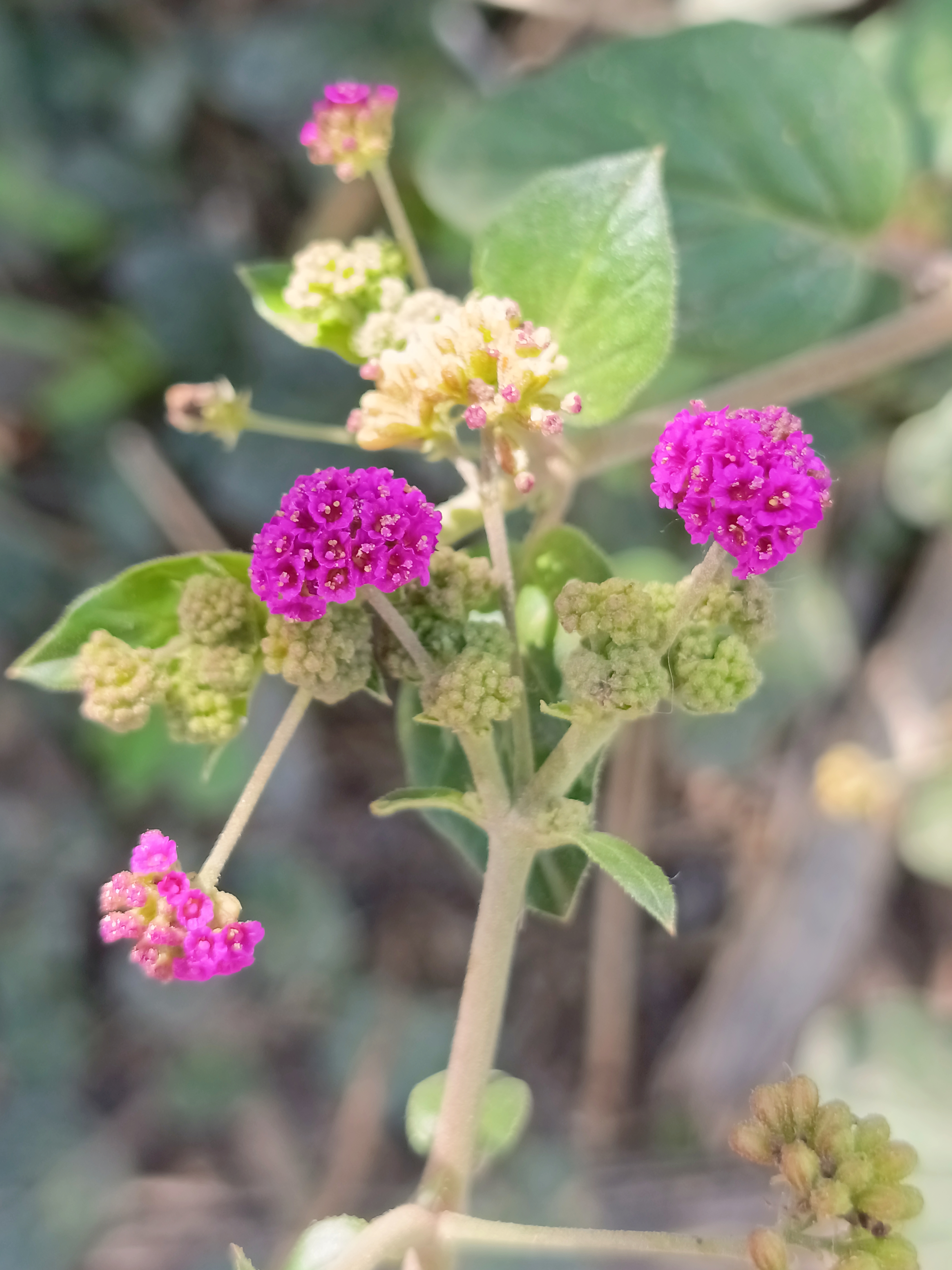

Conservation status
- Secure (NatureServe)

Scientific classification
- Kingdom: Plantae
- Clade: Tracheophytes
- Clade: Angiosperms
- Clade: Eudicots
- Order: Caryophyllales
- Family: Nyctaginaceae
- Genus: Boerhavia
- Species: B. coccinea

Binomial name
- Boerhavia coccinea Mill.

Synonyms
- List: Boerhavia hirsuta Jacq.; Boerhavia caribaea Jacq.; Boerhavia diffusa Sw.; Boerhavia obtusifolia Lam.; Boerhavia polymorpha Rich.; Boerhavia viscosa Lag. & Rodr.; Boerhavia patula Dombey ex Vahl; Boerhavia squamata Raf.; Boerhavia nantocana Schauer; Boerhavia adscendens var. pubescens Choisy; Boerhavia diffusa var. obtusifolia Choisy; Boerhavia glandulosa Andersson; Boerhavia repens var. undulata Asch. & Schweinf.; Boerhavia reboudiana Pomel; Boerhavia diffusa var. hirsuta Heimerl; Boerhavia marlothii Heimerl; Boerhavia diffusa var. paniculata Kuntze; Boerhavia sonorae Rose; Boerhavia diffusa var. viscosa (Lag. & Rodr.) Heimerl; Boerhavia ramulosa M.E.Jones; Boerhavia viscosa f. oligadena Heimerl; Boerhavia viscosa subsp. apiculata Standl.; Boerhavia bracteata T.Cooke; Boerhavia ixodes Standl.; Boerhavia coccinea f. parcehirsuta Heimerl; Boerhavia agglutinans Batt. & Trab.; Boerhavia diffusa f. crassifolia Domin; Boerhavia diffusa var. xerophila Domin; Boerhavia repens subsp. viscosa (Lag. & Rodr.) Maire; Boerhavia squamata Raf.; Boerhavia coccinea var. paniculata (Kuntze) Moscoso; Boerhavia diffusa var. hirta Balle; Boerhavia coccinea var. pubescens (Choisy) Cufod.; Boerhavia diffusa var. undulata (Asch. & Schweinf.) Cufod.

= Boerhavia coccinea =

Species of plant

Boerhavia coccinea is a species of flowering plant in the four o'clock family which is known by many common names, including tar vine scarlet spiderling and red boerhavia.

== Description ==
This plant grows in a wide variety of habitats, including disturbed areas as a common roadside weed. It is a low-lying, sprawling perennial herb producing reaching stems which can exceed a meter in length. The stems are somewhat hairy and sticky with glands. The generally oval-shaped leaves are held on short petioles. They are wavy along the edges and may have reddish margins. The inflorescence is a small head of tiny frilly flowers, each just a few millimeters long. The flowers are often bright scarlet to red-violet in color but can be shades of pink, yellow, or white.

== Native range ==
The native range of the species is uncertain. It is considered to be native to the Americas, Africa, the Arabian Peninsula, the Indian sub-continent and parts of Australia. Some data suggests the species originated in an area between the southern USA and northern South America and introduced to other parts of the world by human activity.

The species' range in Australia has expanded under human activity. In Africa, B. coccinea has been found in Uganda, Kenya, and Tanzania. The uncertainty concerning the native range is exacerbated by the difficulty of distinguishing species within the B. diffusa-B. coccinea complex.

== Invasiveness ==
The plant exists in many parts of the world and some sources consider it an invasive species in most. The species' range in Australia has expanded under human activity.

Perhaps the most well-known instance of the plant's naturalization is the southeastern United States. A few distant locations of invasion include Hawaii and a few Asian countries. In Asia, specifically in Taiwan, B. coccinea is found among other weeds on the sides of roads, in lawns, and along bodies of water. Globally, the plant tends to live near large bodies of water.

== Uses ==
The plant has historically been used for its medicinal properties.

The leaves and roots of B. coccinea are used medicinally in countries including Cameroon, Ethiopia, Namibia, Nigeria, Tanzania, Mexico, Brazil, Argentina, and Paraguay. In traditional Mexican Medicine, B. coccinea has been used to treat conditions such as diarrhea and dysentery. The plant is usually used medicinally to treat pain and inflammation because of its anti-inflammatory and antinociceptive properties. The chemical explanation for these properties is an active topic of research. It is also eaten by humans and used as animal feed. A flour can be made from its seeds.

== As a weed ==
Even in places where the plant is native, such as Sonora, Mexico, the weed is often found competing with important crops.

== Gallery ==
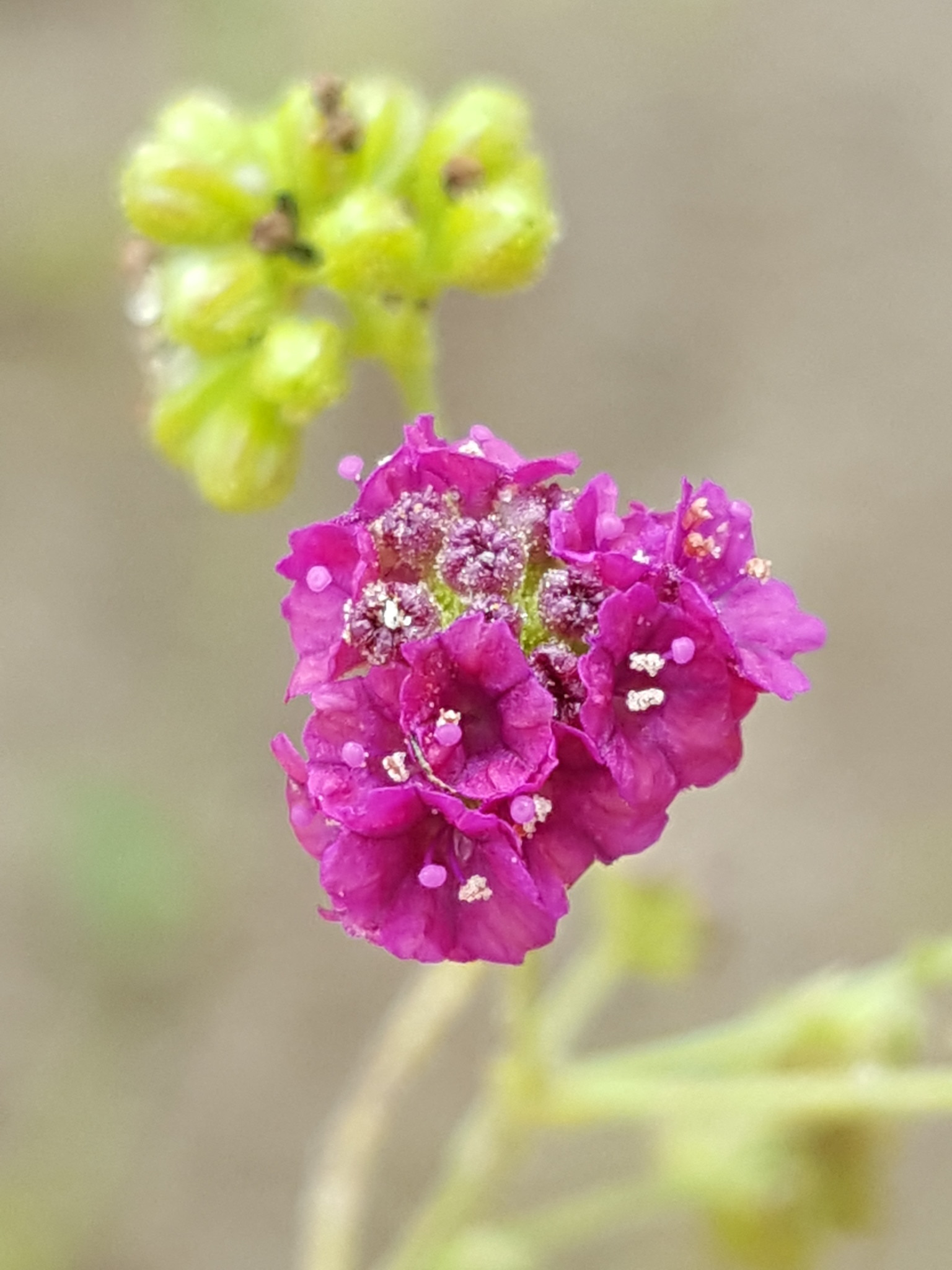

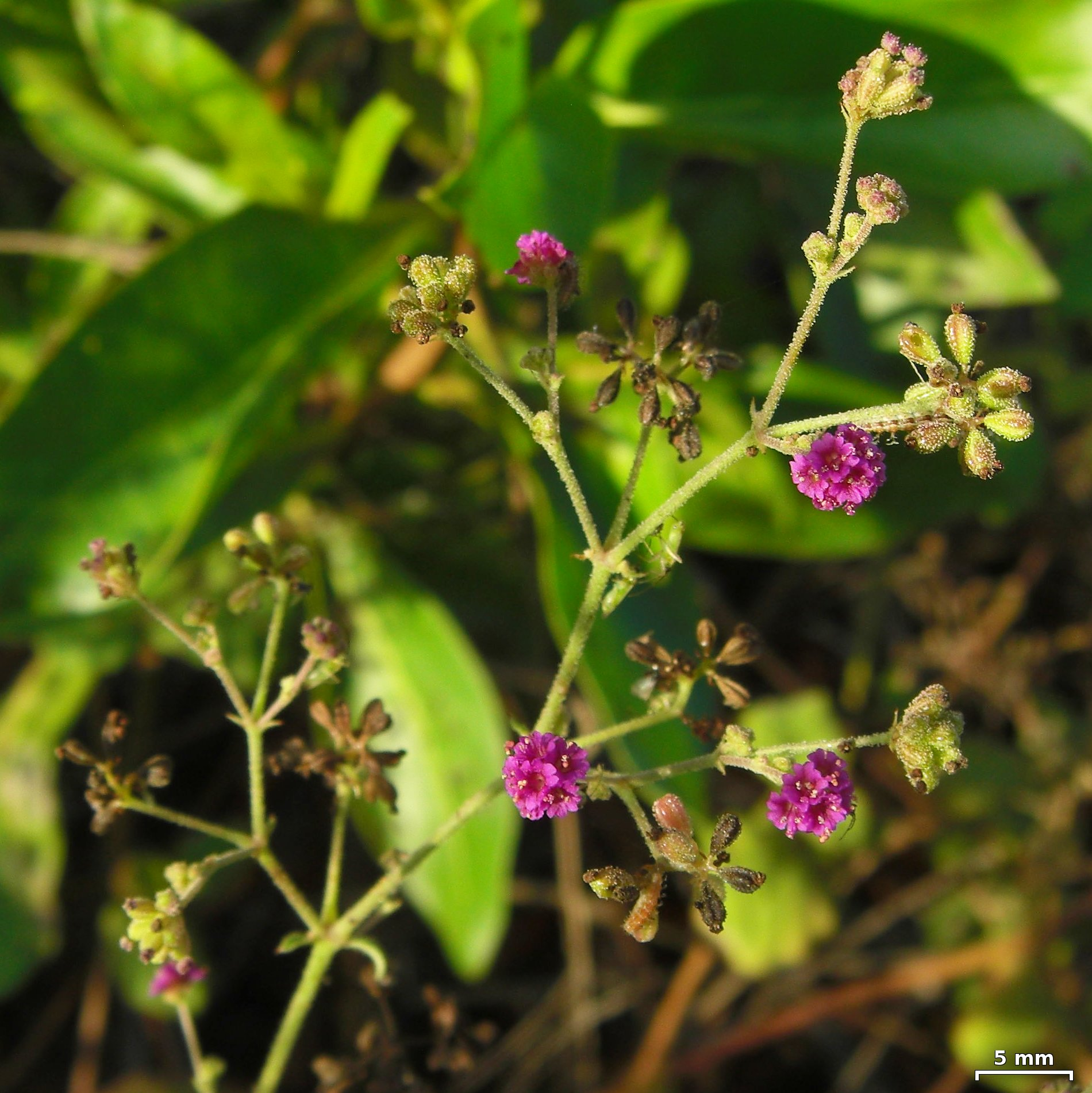

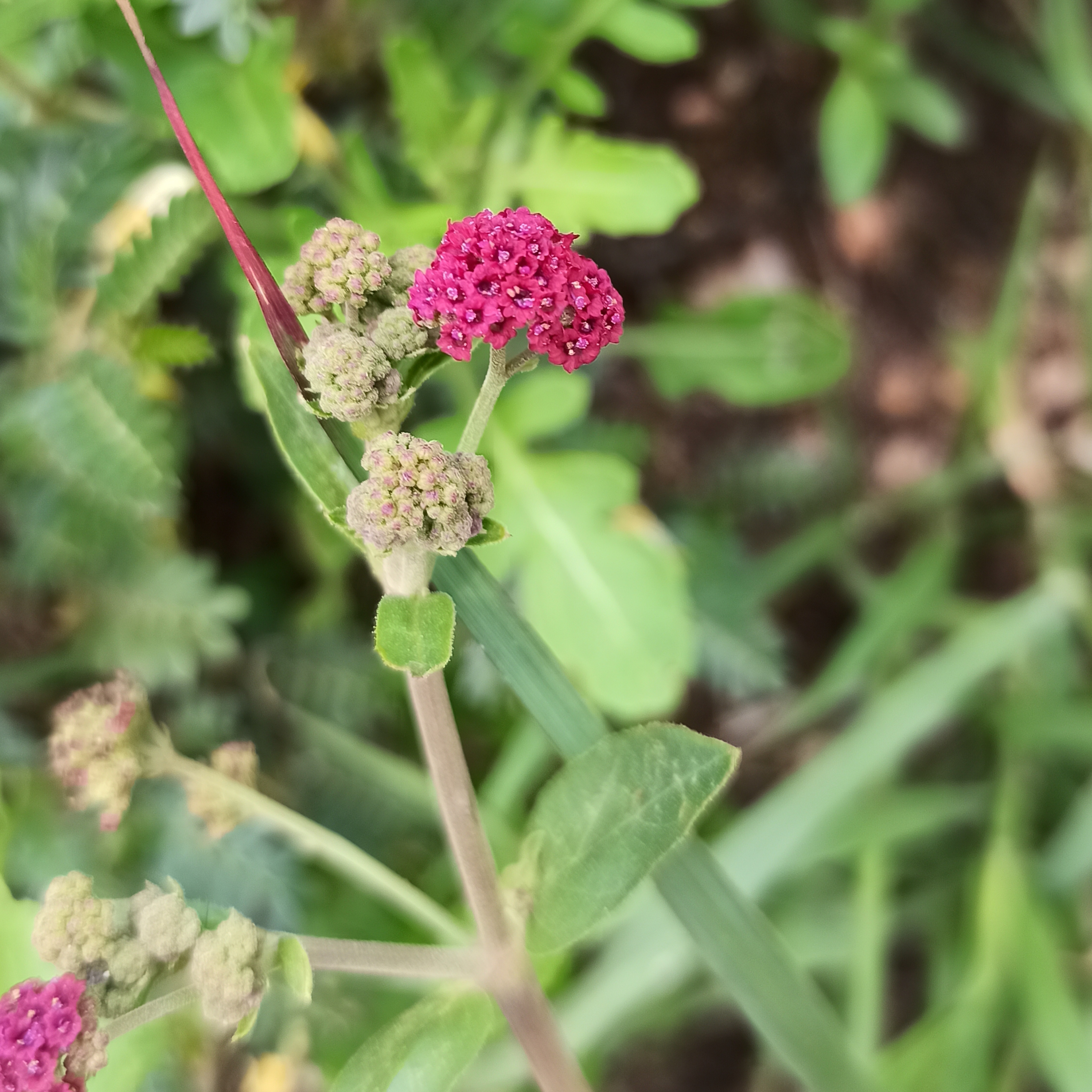

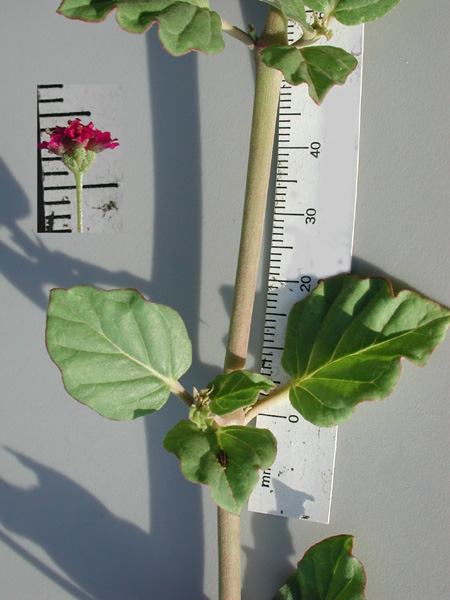

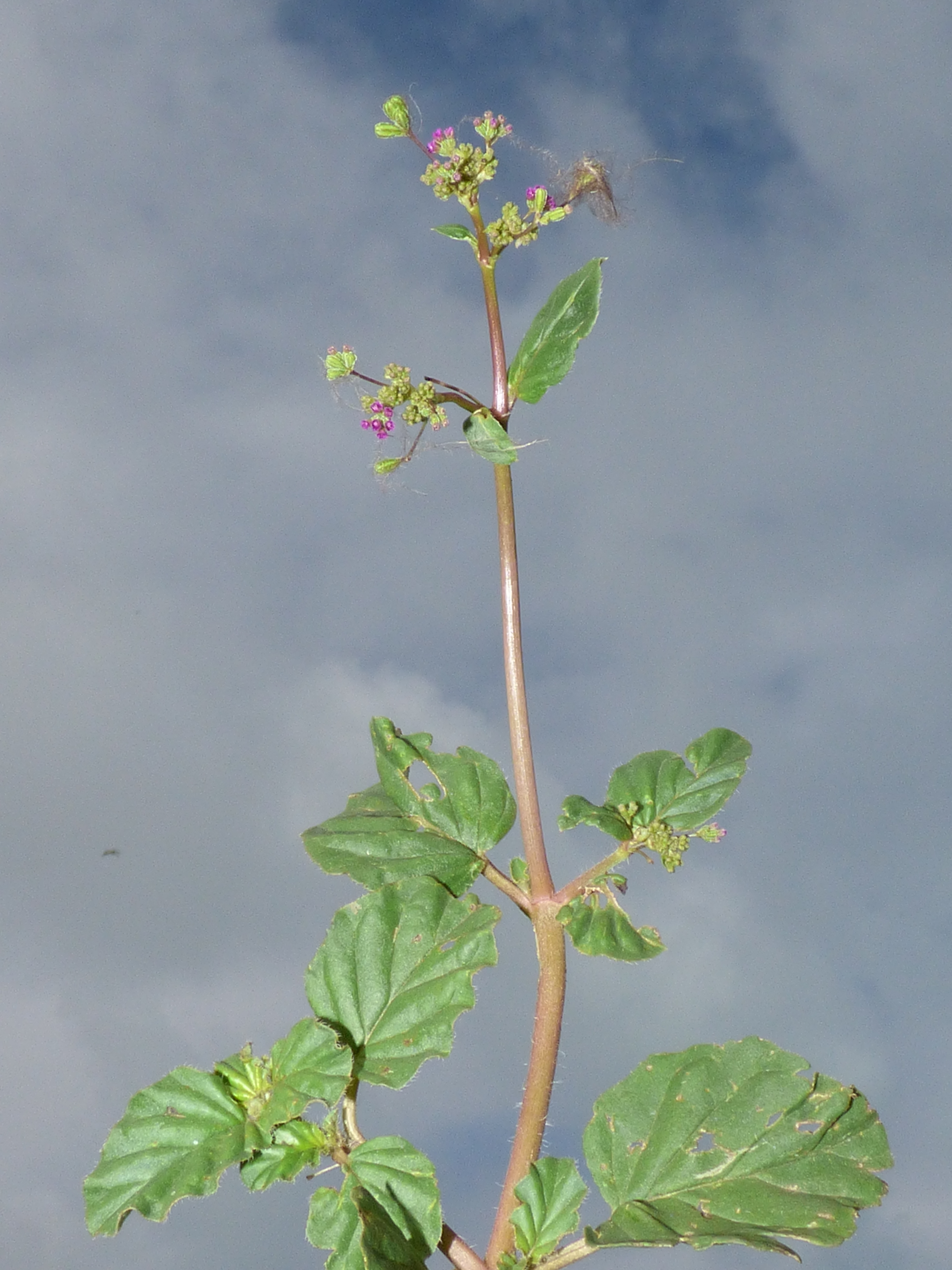

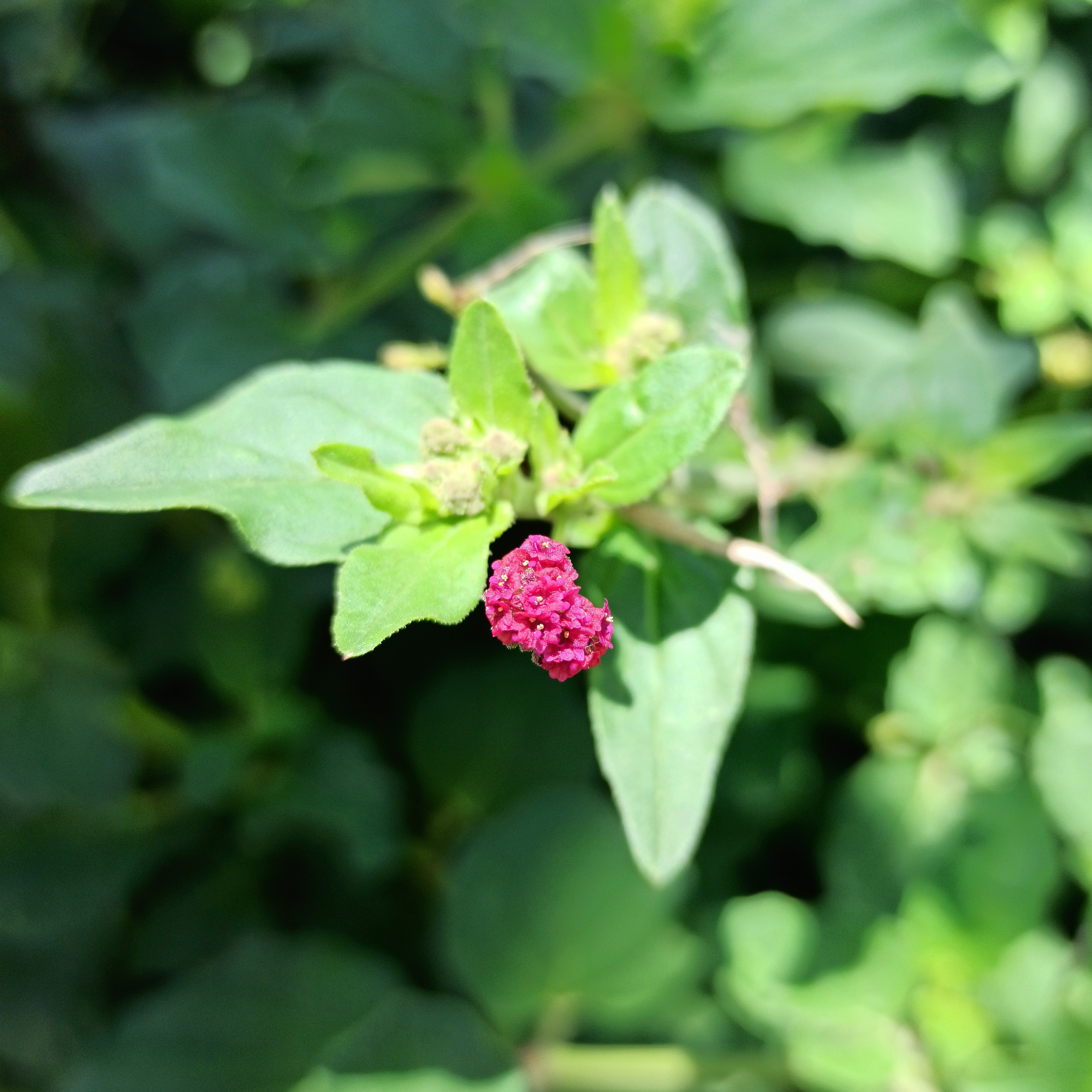
