= Cassinia hewsoniae =

Scientific classification
- Kingdom: Plantae
- Clade: Tracheophytes
- Clade: Angiosperms
- Clade: Eudicots
- Clade: Asterids
- Order: Asterales
- Family: Asteraceae
- Genus: Cassinia
- Species: C. hewsoniae

Binomial name
- Cassinia hewsoniae Orchard

Species of flowering plant

Cassinia hewsoniae is a species of flowering plant in the family Asteraceae and is native to New South Wales and the Australian Capital Territory. It is an erect shrub with a sticky, densely-hairy stems, needle-shaped leaves and flower heads arranged in flat or rounded corymbs.

== Description ==
Cassinia hewsoniae is an erect shrub that typically grows to a height of 0.8–2.0 m (2 ft 7 in – 6 ft 7 in) with its stems sticky from its dense layer of glandular hairs. The leaves are cylindrical, 8–50 mm (0.31–1.97 in) long and 0.5–0.9 mm (0.020–0.035 in) wide. The edges of the leaves are rolled under, the upper surface is sticky and the lower surface of the leaves is densely covered with cottony hairs. The flower heads are arranged in flat or rounded corymbs of forty to one hundred heads, each head with seven to twelve cream coloured florets surrounded by involucral bracts in five whorls. The achenes are silvery-white with a bristly pappus of 15 to 17 bristles.

== Taxonomy and naming ==
Cassinia hewsoniae was first formally described in 2004 by Anthony Edward Orchard in Australian Systematic Botany from specimens collected near Manildra in 2004. It was named to honour botanist Helen Joan Hewson.

== Distribution and habitat ==
This species of Cassinia grows in mallee and woodland in south-central New South Wales and in the Australian Capital Territory.
