= Lunamarine =

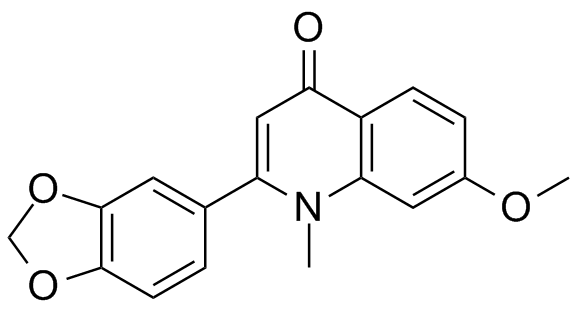

Names
- Preferred IUPAC name 2-(2H-1,3-Benzodioxol-5-yl)-7-methoxy-1-methylquinolin-4(1H)-one

Identifiers
CAS Number	483-52-3
3D model (JSmol)	Interactive image
ChEBI	CHEBI:6565
ChemSpider	391225
KEGG	C10713
PubChem CID	442922
UNII	CFJ8Y4H85E
CompTox Dashboard (EPA)	DTXSID70332007
- InChI: InChI=1S/C18H15NO4/c1-19-14(11-3-6-17-18(7-11)23-10-22-17)9-16(20)13-5-4-12(21-2)8-15(13)19/h3-9H,10H2,1-2H3 Key: GOMVNCXQVLUIGA-UHFFFAOYSA-N; InChI=1S/C18H15NO4/c1-19-14(11-3-6-17-18(7-11)23-10-22-17)9-16(20)13-5-4-12(21-2)8-15(13)19/h3-9H,10H2,1-2H3 Key: GOMVNCXQVLUIGA-UHFFFAOYSA-N
- SMILES: Cn1c2cc(ccc2c(=O)cc1c3ccc4c(c3)OCO4)OC

Properties
Chemical formula	C_{18}H_{15}NO_{14}
Molar mass	469.311 g·mol^{−1}
- Except where otherwise noted, data are given for materials in their standard state (at 25 °C [77 °F], 100 kPa). Infobox references

Lunamarine (punarnavine) is a quinolone alkaloid present in Boerhavia diffusa (punarnava).

The compound has shown some in vitro anticancer, antiestrogenic, immunomodulatory, and anti-amoebic activity (particularly against Entamoeba histolytica).
