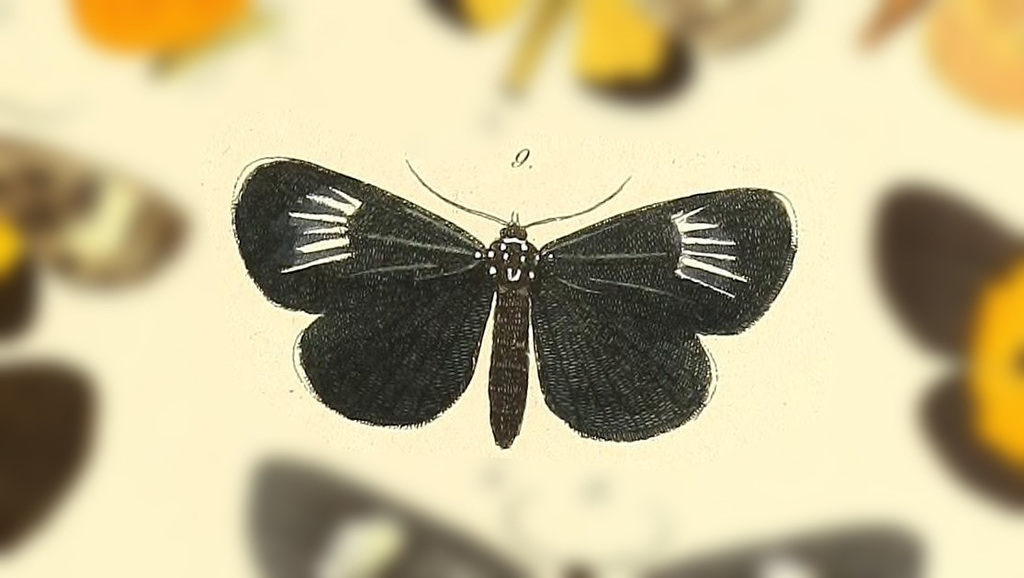
- Illustration

Scientific classification
- Domain: Eukaryota
- Kingdom: Animalia
- Phylum: Arthropoda
- Class: Insecta
- Order: Lepidoptera
- Superfamily: Noctuoidea
- Family: Noctuidae
- Genus: Alypiodes
- Species: A. radians

Binomial name
- Alypiodes radians Felder 1874

Synonyms
- Agarista radians Felder, 1874; Eusemia radians Boisduval, 1874

= Alypiodes radians =

Radiant moth

Species of moth

Alypiodes radians, the radiant moth, is a moth of the family Noctuidae first described by Felder in 1874. They can be found in Mexico.
