= Boerhavia boissieri =

Scientific classification
- Kingdom: Plantae
- Clade: Tracheophytes
- Clade: Angiosperms
- Clade: Eudicots
- Order: Caryophyllales
- Family: Nyctaginaceae
- Genus: Boerhavia
- Species: B. boissieri

Binomial name
- Boerhavia boissieri Heimerl

Species of plant

Boerhavia boissieri is a species of plant in the Nyctaginaceae family. It is a woody-based perennial with long, slender stems with fleshy leaves and small pink flowers. It grows throughout Egypt, Sahara Desert, Sudan, Eritrea, Zaire, Malawi, and the Arabian Peninsula. It may also be called the Commicarpus boissieri. Boerhavia boissieri prefers rocky, open and dry habitats.

== Uses ==
The new tender growing shoots were often picked and chewed- they were said to have a sour, astringent flavour. People far from water would also pluck the tips and chew them to assuage their thirst. In times of hunger, the knobbed roots were dug up, roasted slowly and eaten along with the roots of the Ecbolium violaceum.

== History ==
"Boissieri" commemorates Pierre Edmond Boissier, a distinguished Swiss botanist who wrote Flora Orientalis, the first comprehensive book covering the plants of the Middle East.
