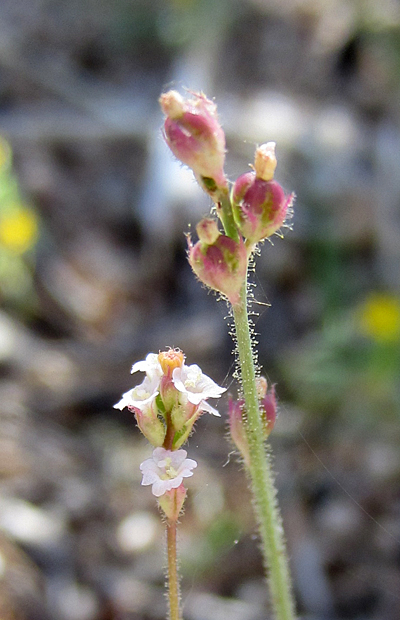

Scientific classification
- Kingdom: Plantae
- Clade: Tracheophytes
- Clade: Angiosperms
- Clade: Eudicots
- Order: Caryophyllales
- Family: Nyctaginaceae
- Genus: Boerhavia
- Species: B. wrightii

Binomial name
- Boerhavia wrightii A.Gray

= Boerhavia wrightii =

Species of flowering plant

Boerhavia wrightii is a species of flowering plant in the four o'clock family known by the common name largebract spiderling. It is native to the deserts of the southwestern United States and northern Mexico, where it grows amongst desert shrubs. This is an annual herb producing a slender, spidery erect stem to about 70 centimeters in maximum length. The leaves are lance-shaped to oblong with rippled edges and roughly pointed ends. Most of the leaves grow near the base of the plant. The inflorescences appear at the ends of the slim stem branches. They bear a few pale pink flowers, each just a few millimeters long, with adjacent reddish or pinkish bracts.
