= Boerhavia elegans =

Scientific classification
- Kingdom: Plantae
- Clade: Tracheophytes
- Clade: Angiosperms
- Clade: Eudicots
- Order: Caryophyllales
- Family: Nyctaginaceae
- Genus: Boerhavia
- Species: B. elegans

Binomial name
- Boerhavia elegans Choisy

Subspecies
- Boerhavia elegans subsp. stenophylla (Boiss.) A.G. Mill., 1994; Boerhavia elegans var. stenophylla Boiss., 1879

Synonyms
- Boerhavia rubicunda Steud. ex Heimerl

Species of flowering plant

Boerhavia elegans is a species of flowering plants in the four o'clock flower family, Nyctaginaceae.

It is one of the species that compose the "tortoise turf", the food source of the Aldabra giant tortoise, of the Aldabra Atoll in the Seychelles.
