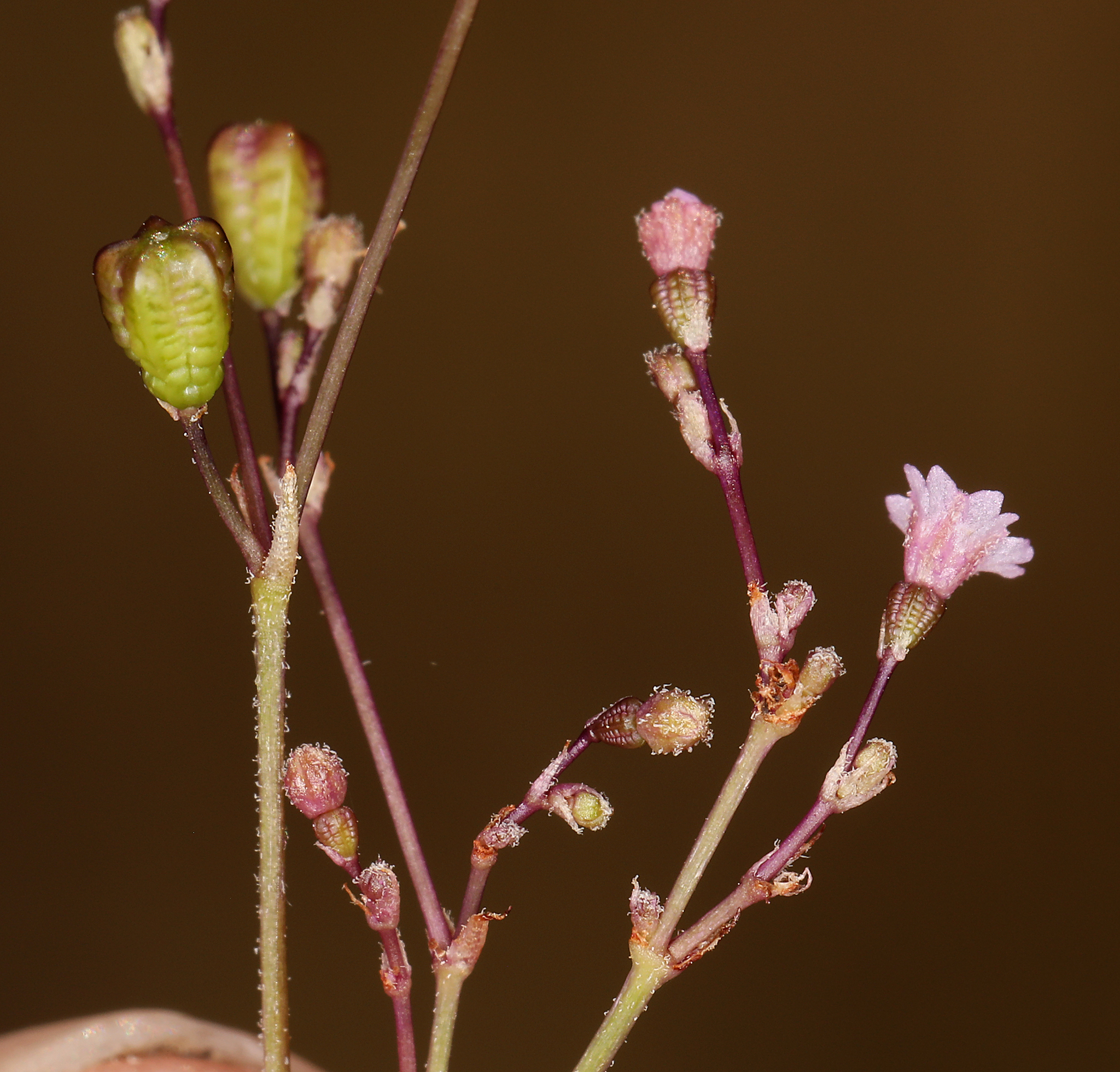

Scientific classification
- Kingdom: Plantae
- Clade: Tracheophytes
- Clade: Angiosperms
- Clade: Eudicots
- Order: Caryophyllales
- Family: Nyctaginaceae
- Genus: Boerhavia
- Species: B. coulteri

Binomial name
- Boerhavia coulteri (Hook.f.) S.Wats.

= Boerhavia coulteri =

Species of flowering plant

Boerhavia coulteri is a species of flowering plant in the four o'clock family known by the common name Coulter's spiderling. It is native to the southwestern United States and northern Mexico, particularly the desert areas. This is an annual herb producing an erect or creeping stem up to about 70 or 80 centimeters in maximum length. They are slightly hairy and have sticky resin glands toward the bases. The leaves are lance-shaped to somewhat triangular, pointed, sometimes wavy or rippled along the edges, and 5 centimeters in maximum length. Most of the leaves grow from the lower half of the plant. The sticky inflorescence is a small cluster of tiny white to pale pink flowers, each under two millimeters long. The fruit is an elliptical body a few millimeters in length with longitudinal ribs. The fruits are borne in small clusters.
