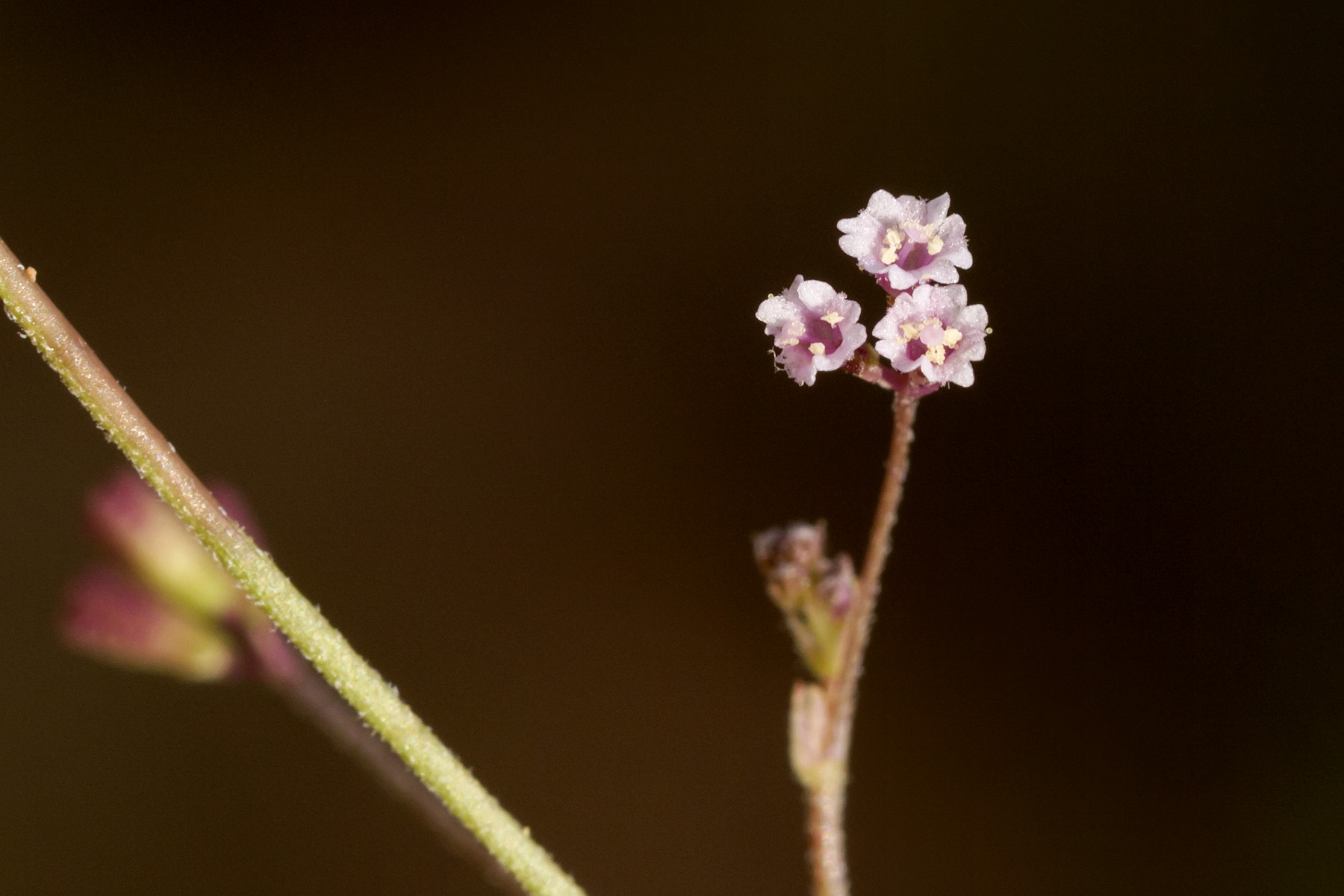
- B. triquetra var. intermedia

Conservation status
- Apparently Secure (NatureServe)

Scientific classification
- Kingdom: Plantae
- Clade: Tracheophytes
- Clade: Angiosperms
- Clade: Eudicots
- Order: Caryophyllales
- Family: Nyctaginaceae
- Genus: Boerhavia
- Species: B. triquetra

Binomial name
- Boerhavia triquetra S.Watson

Synonyms
- Boerhavia erecta var. intermedia (M. E. Jones) Kearney & Peebles; Boerhavia intermedia M. E. Jones; Boerhavia universitatis Standl.

= Boerhavia triquetra =

Species of flowering plant

Boerhavia triquetra, commonly known as creeping sticky stem, five-wing spiderling, slender spiderling, or spiderling, is an annual species of spiderling plant in the four o'clock family (Nyctaginaceae).

== Description ==
This species of plant is an annual herb that is somewhat variable in appearance, but in general it is loosely clumping, raising erect stems up to half a metre in height. It has lance-shaped, wavy-margined leaves and bears a branching inflorescence of clustered or singular flowers, each pale pink flower only one or two millimetres across. The clustered fruits that appear afterwards are tiny club-shaped, ridged achenes less than 3 mm long. This is a hardy plant, growing in arid, rocky, or disturbed areas, and often showing up as a roadside weed.

== Distribution and habitat ==
This species is a fairly widespread in the south-western United States and northern Mexico. It is native to California and Arizona, in habitats of the Mojave Desert and Sonoran Desert.
