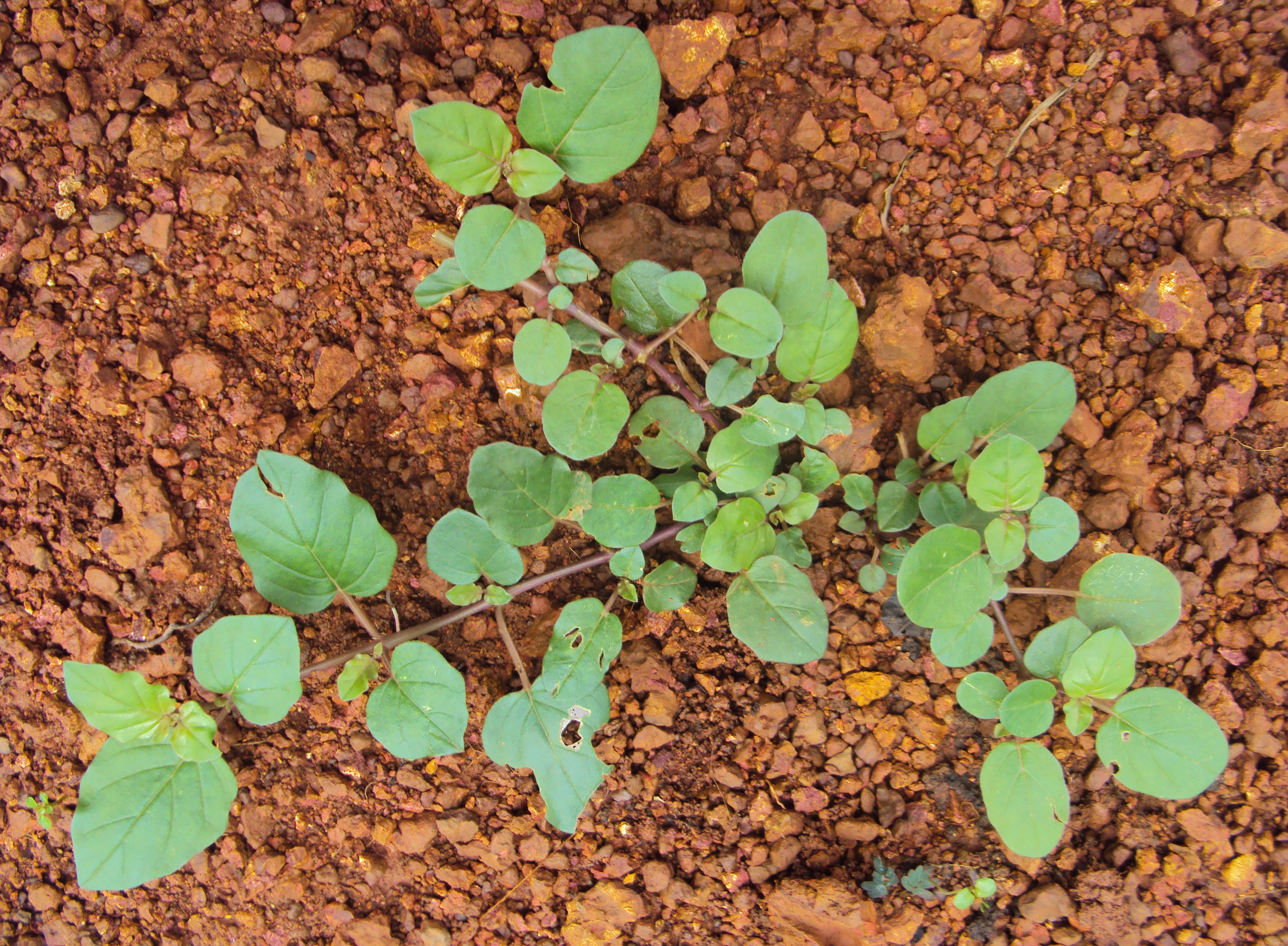

Scientific classification
- Kingdom: Plantae
- Clade: Tracheophytes
- Clade: Angiosperms
- Clade: Eudicots
- Order: Caryophyllales
- Family: Nyctaginaceae
- Genus: Boerhavia
- Species: B. diffusa

Binomial name
- Boerhavia diffusa L. nom. cons.

= Boerhavia diffusa =

Species of flowering plant

Boerhavia diffusa is a species of flowering plant in the four o'clock family, called red spiderling, spreading hogweed, or tarvine. It is taken in herbal medicine for pain relief and other uses. The leaves of Boerhavia diffusa are often used as a green vegetable in many parts of India.

== Description ==
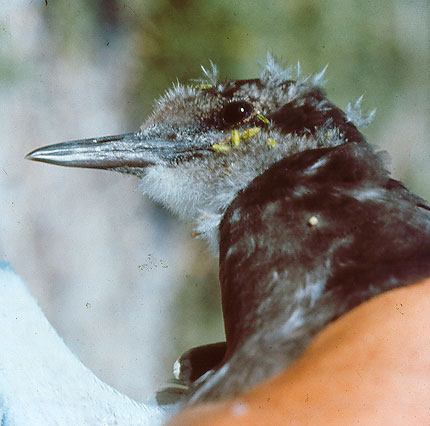
Fruit of B. diffusa stuck to face of juvenile sooty tern

Boerhavia diffusa is widely dispersed, occurring throughout India (where it is known as punarnava and used in Ayurveda,), the Pacific, and southern United States. Flowers are small, around 5 mm in diameter. Pollens are round, roughly 65 microns in diameter.

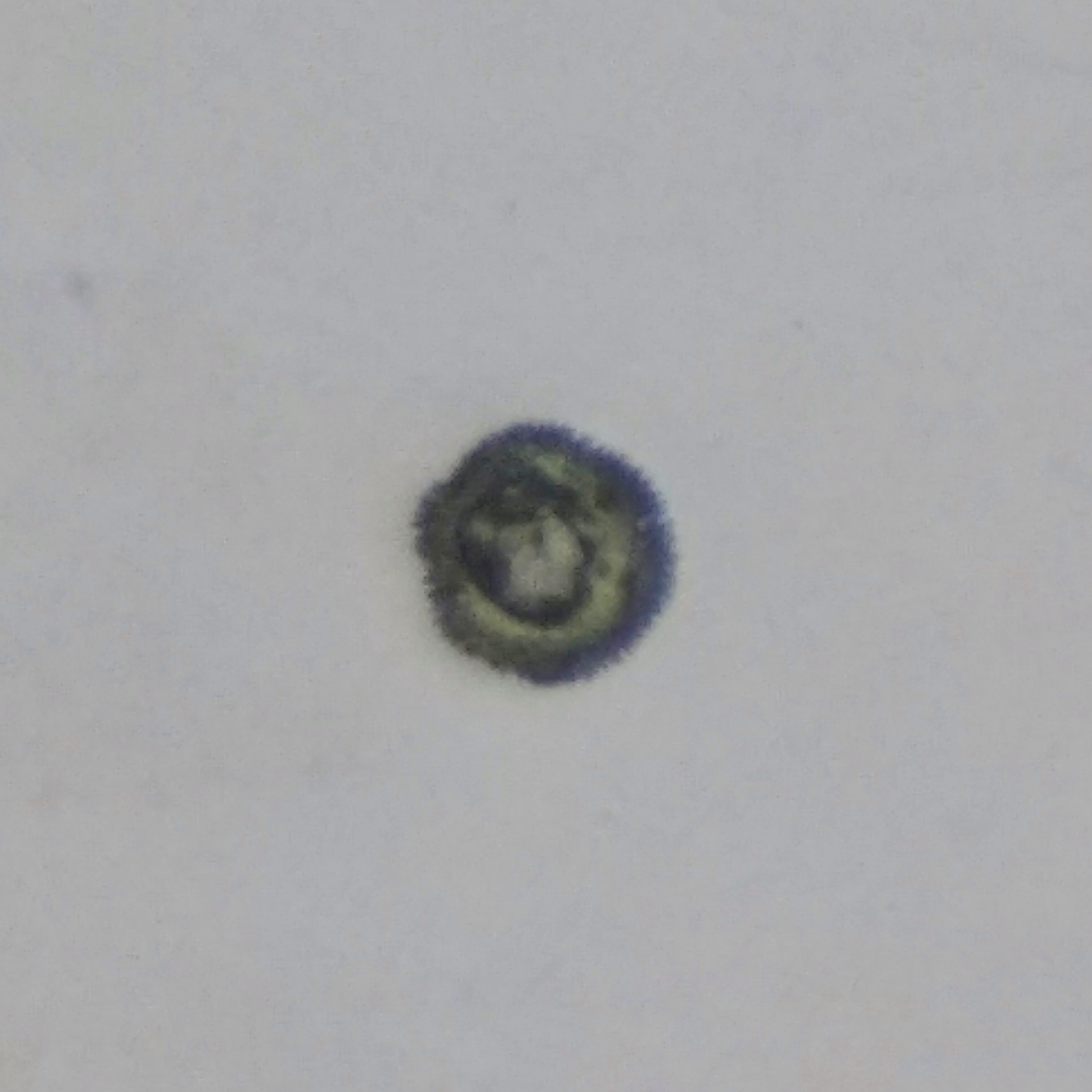
Pollen

This wide range is explained by its small fruit, which are very sticky and grow a few inches off the ground, ideally placed to latch on to small migratory birds as they walk by.

Habit

A creeping, perennial, much-branched herb with stout fusi form roots.

Stem

Branches divaricate, stem purplish, thickened at nodes.

Leaves

Opposite, oblique, ovate or sub orbicular, rounded, entire, margins slightly pinkish, wavy, lower surface with small, white scales, base rounded.

Inflorescence

Small umbels forming Corymbose, axillary and terminal panicle.

Flowers

- Bracteoles, acute. Perianth -tube constricted above the ovary, limb funnel-shaped, dark-pink, with 5 vertical bands outside.
- Stamens 2 or 3, slightly exserted, unequal.
- Ovary superior, oblique, ovule 1, erect, stigma.

Fruit

Achene rounded, 6-ribbed.

Seed

Minute, albuminous with endosperm. Embryo curved.

== Distribution ==
A true and accurate accounting of the native range of Boerhavia diffusa has not been determined. However, it is very widespread, and has become naturalized in many places. It is believed to be a native plant to the following places in:

- Africa —

Botswana, Egypt, Eswatini, Ghana, Kenya, Liberia, Malawi, Mozambique, Namibia, Nigeria, Rwanda, Senegal, Sierra Leone, Somalia, South Africa (Eastern Cape, Gauteng, KwaZulu-Natal, Limpopo, Mpumalanga, Northern Cape provinces), Tanzania, Togo, Uganda, Zambia, and Zimbabwe.

- Asia —

Bangladesh, Sri Lanka, Burma, Cambodia, China (Fujian, Guangdong, Guangxi, Guizhou, Hainan, Sichuan, and Yunnan), India, Indonesia, Japan (Ryukyu Islands), Laos, Malaysia, Nepal, Pakistan (Punjab, Sind, Balochistan, Gilgit Baltistan), the Philippines, southern Taiwan, Thailand, and Vietnam. Also, on the Arabian Peninsula in Oman, Saudi Arabia, and the United Arab Emirates, and Yemen (Socotra).

- North America —

Mexico, and the U.S. (in the states of Florida, Georgia, and South Carolina).

- Caribbean —

Anguilla, the Bahamas, the Cayman Islands, Cuba, Dominica, Grenada, Hispaniola (Dominican Republic and Haiti), Jamaica, Montserrat, the Netherlands Antilles (Saba), Puerto Rico, Saint Lucia, Saint Vincent and the Grenadines, and both the British and the U.S. Virgin Islands.

- South America —

Argentina, Belize, Bolivia, Chile, Costa Rica, Ecuador, French Guiana, Guatemala, Guyana, Nicaragua, Panama, Paraguay, Peru, Suriname, Uruguay, and Venezuela.

- South Pacific —

Fiji, and New Caledonia.

== Chemistry ==
Boerhavia G and Boerhavia H are two rotenoids isolated from B. diffusa. A quinolone alkaloid, lunamarine, isolated from B. diffusa has shown some in vitro anticancer, antiestrogenic, immunomodulatory, and anti-amoebic activity (particularly against Entamoeba histolytica). The plant contains a protein called BDP-30, presumably a ribosome-inactivating protein.
