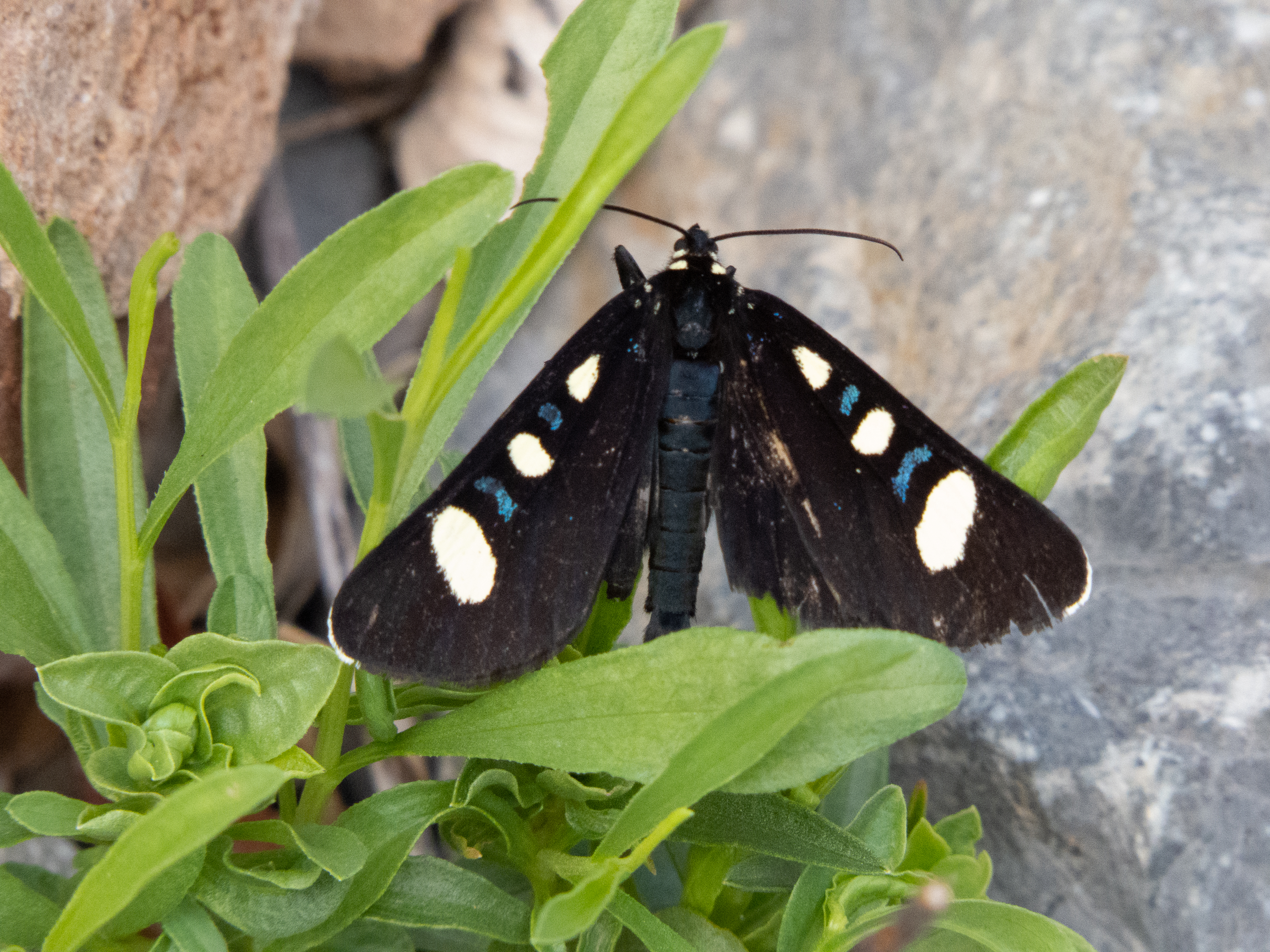

Scientific classification
- Kingdom: Animalia
- Phylum: Arthropoda
- Clade: Pancrustacea
- Class: Insecta
- Order: Lepidoptera
- Superfamily: Noctuoidea
- Family: Noctuidae
- Genus: Alypiodes
- Species: A. bimaculata

Binomial name
- Alypiodes bimaculata (Herrich-Schäffer, 1853)

Synonyms
- Agarista bimaculata Herrich-Schäffer, 1853; Eusemia crescens; Agarista grotei Boisduval, 1874; Alypia trimaculata Boisduval, 1874

= Alypiodes bimaculata =

Species of moth

Alypiodes bimaculata, the two-spotted forester, is a species of moth in the family Noctuidae (the owlet moths). The species was first described by Gottlieb August Wilhelm Herrich-Schäffer in 1853. It is found in North America.

The MONA or Hodges number for Alypiodes bimaculata is 9312.
