= Boerhavia gracillima =

Slimstalk spiderling

Conservation status
- Secure (NatureServe)

Scientific classification
- Kingdom: Plantae
- Clade: Tracheophytes
- Clade: Angiosperms
- Clade: Eudicots
- Order: Caryophyllales
- Family: Nyctaginaceae
- Genus: Boerhavia
- Species: B. gracillima

Binomial name
- Boerhavia gracillima Heimerl

Synonyms
- Boerhavia gracillima subsp. decalvata Heimerl ex Standl.; Boerhavia organensis Standl.

Species of flowering plant

Boerhavia gracillima, the slimstalk spiderling, is a plant species native to Arizona, New Mexico, Texas and Mexico. It prefers dry, rocky areas such as grasslands, desert scrub, roadsides and pinyon-juniper woodlands.

Boerhavia gracillima is a perennial herb, often woody at the base. Stems are trailing to erect, with many branches. Leaves are mostly on the lower half of the plant, getting smaller further up. Flowers are red, clustered in the axils of the leaves or at the tips of the stems, each flower up to 4.5 mm (0.2 inches) long.
