= Helen Joan Hewson =

Australian botanist, scientific editor and scientific illustrator (1938–2007)

Helen Joan Hewson (24 June 1938 – 29 October 2007) was an Australian botanist and botanical illustrator. In addition to collecting and describing flora, she is known as the author and illustrator of Australia: 300 Years of Botanical Illustration.

== Biography ==
Hewson was born at Benalla, Victoria on 24 June 1938. She grew up on a farm, where her interest in botany was sparked. She graduated from the University of Sydney in 1969 with a PhD for her thesis, "The cytology and taxonomy of the family aneuraceae in Australia and New Guinea". She later completed a BA at the then Canberra College of Advanced Education in 1985.

Over her career, Hewson described 1 family, 2 genera and 54 species. Plants named in her honour include Jungermannia hewsoniae (1968), Plagiochila hewsoniana (1972), Fossombronia hewsonii (1987) and Cassinia hewsoniae (2004).

== Selected publications ==
- Rowan, Ellis; Hazzard, Margaret (1982). Flower paintings of Ellis Rowan: From the collection of the National Library of Australia. Botanical notes on flora by Helen Hewson. Canberra: National Library of Australia. ISBN 978-0-642-89730-5.
- Hewson, Helen (1988). Plant indumentum: a handbook of terminology. Australian flora and fauna series. Illustrated by Margaret (Menadue) Wilson (1st ed.). Canberra: Australian Government Publishing Service. ISBN 978-0-644-50456-0.
- Hunter, John (1989). Calaby, John H. (ed.). The Hunter sketchbook: birds & flowers of New South Wales drawn on the spot in 1788, 89 & 90. Notes on plant plates by Helen Hewson (Limited ed.). Canberra: National Library of Australia. ISBN 978-0-642-10459-5.
- Hewson, Helen (1999). Australia: 300 years of botanical illustration. Foreword by HRH The Prince of Wales (International ed.). Collingwood, VIC: CSIRO Publishing. ISBN 978-0-643-06366-2.

== Death and legacy ==
Hewson in Canberra died on 29 October 2007.

The Dr. Helen Hewson Award for Traditional Botanical Art was established and first awarded by the Wildlife and Botanical Artist Association in Canberra in 2007.
