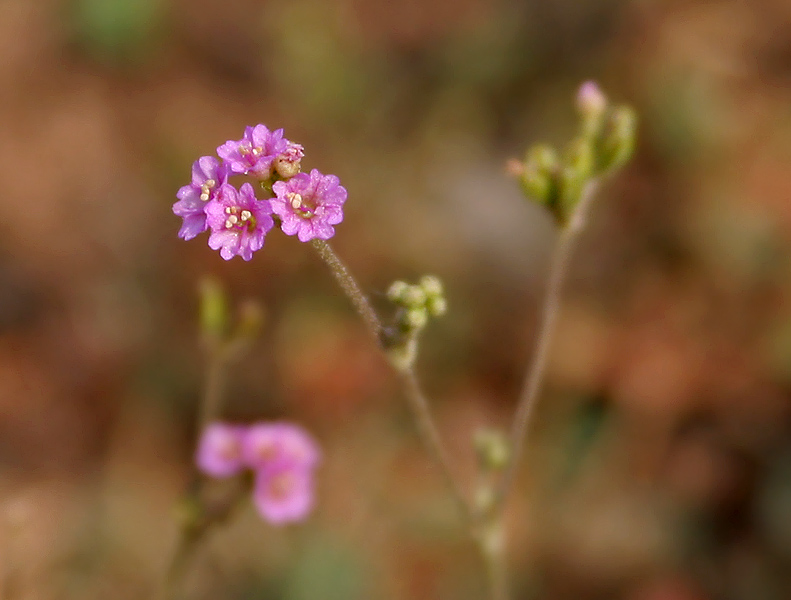
- Boerhavia diffusa

Scientific classification
- Kingdom: Plantae
- Clade: Tracheophytes
- Clade: Angiosperms
- Clade: Eudicots
- Order: Caryophyllales
- Family: Nyctaginaceae
- Tribe: Nyctagineae
- Genus: Boerhavia; L.

Species
- See text

Synonyms
- Axia Lour.; Dantia Lippert ex Choisy

= Boerhavia =

Genus of flowering plants

Boerhavia is a genus of over 100 species in the Nyctaginaceae family. The genus was named for Herman Boerhaave, a Dutch botanist, and the genus name is frequently misspelled "Boerhaavia". Common names include spiderlings and hogweeds.

== Taxonomy ==
There are over 100 species in the genus Boerhavia, which is in the family Nyctaginaceae, which includes the four o'clock flower.

The genus was named for the Dutch botanist Herman Boerhaave, and often misspelt as "Boerhaavia". Common names include spiderlings and hogweeds.

== Description ==
Some species are annuals and others perennials. In habit they generally are herbaceous.

"Spiderling" refers to the appearance of those species that bear inflorescences on numerous long, slender stems, interlocking in a manner suggestive of a spider or spider's web.

Boerhavia species generally are native to warm tropical regions.

== Significance ==
Several species of Boerhavia are of importance as agricultural and horticultural weeds. Some are valued as forage for grazing livestock, and some, such as Boerhavia erecta, also are of use as human food and folk medicine.

== Selected species ==
Species include:

- Boerhavia anisophylla Torr. – wineflower
- Boerhavia boissieri
- Boerhavia coccinea P.Mill. – scarlet spiderling
- Boerhavia coulteri (Hook.f.) S.Wats. - Coulter spiderling, Coulter's spiderling
- Boerhavia diffusa L. – red spiderling
- Boerhavia dominii Meikle & Hewson – tah-vine
- Boerhavia elegans
- Boerhavia erecta L. – erect spiderling
- Boerhavia gracillima Heimerl – slim-stalk spiderling, slimstalk spiderling
- Boerhavia herbstii Fosberg – alena
- Boerhavia linearifolia Gray – narrowleaf spiderling
- Boerhavia mathisiana F.B.Jones – Mathis' spiderling
- Boerhavia megaptera Standl. – annual spiderling, Tucson Mountain spiderling
- Boerhavia pterocarpa S.Wats. – Apache Pass spiderling
- Boerhavia purpurascens Gray – purple spiderling
- Boerhavia repens L.
- Boerhavia scandens L. – climbing spiderling, climbing wartclub, wishbone vine
- Boerhavia spicata Choisy – creeping spiderling
- Boerhavia tetrandra G.Forst. Range: Lord Howe Island, Pacific islands, New South Wales, Queensland, Polynesia, Micronesia. Native names across the Pacific Islands include runa, paikea, tiale katuli, tiare katuri, katuri, naunau, and momoe. Found on Bramble Cay in the Torres Strait, and eaten as a type of spinach by humans.
- Boerhavia triquetra S.Wats. – slender spiderling
- Boerhavia wrightii Gray – Wright's boerhavia

== Gallery ==
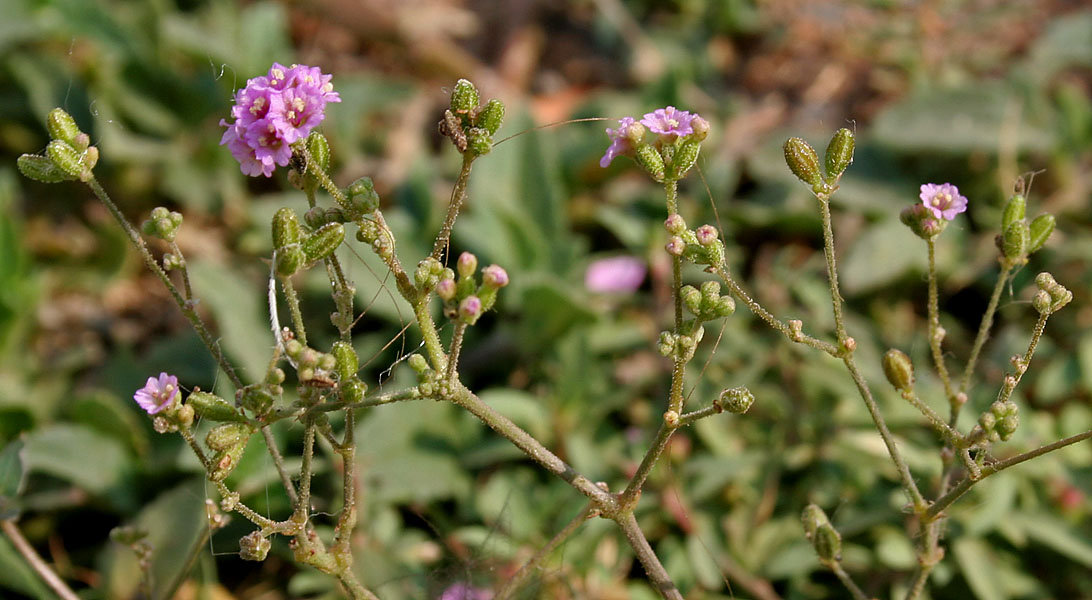
Boerhavia diffusa in Amaravathi village, Guntur district, India.

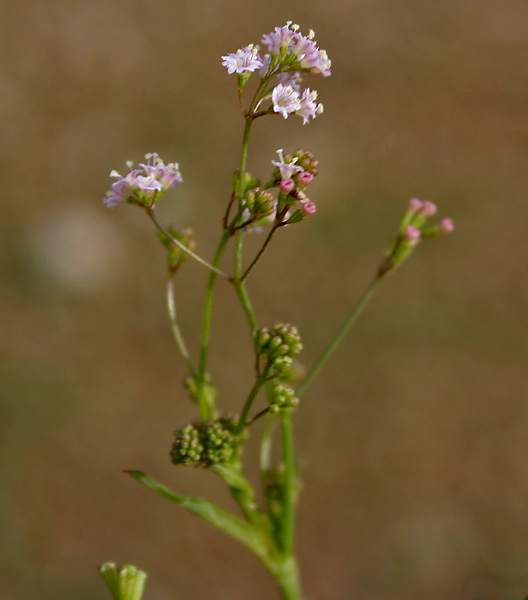
Boerhavia erecta in Hyderabad, India.

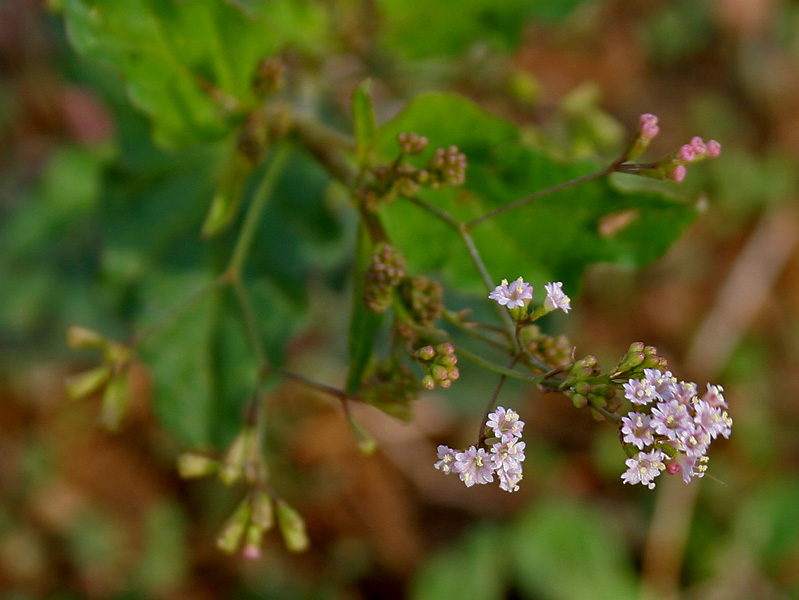
B. erecta in Hyderabad

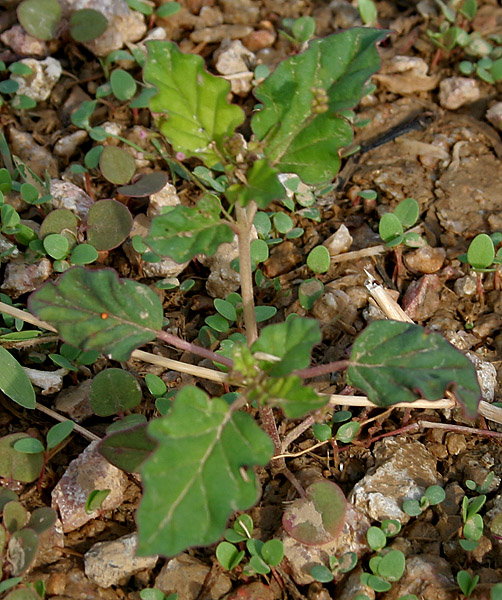
B. erecta in Hyderabad

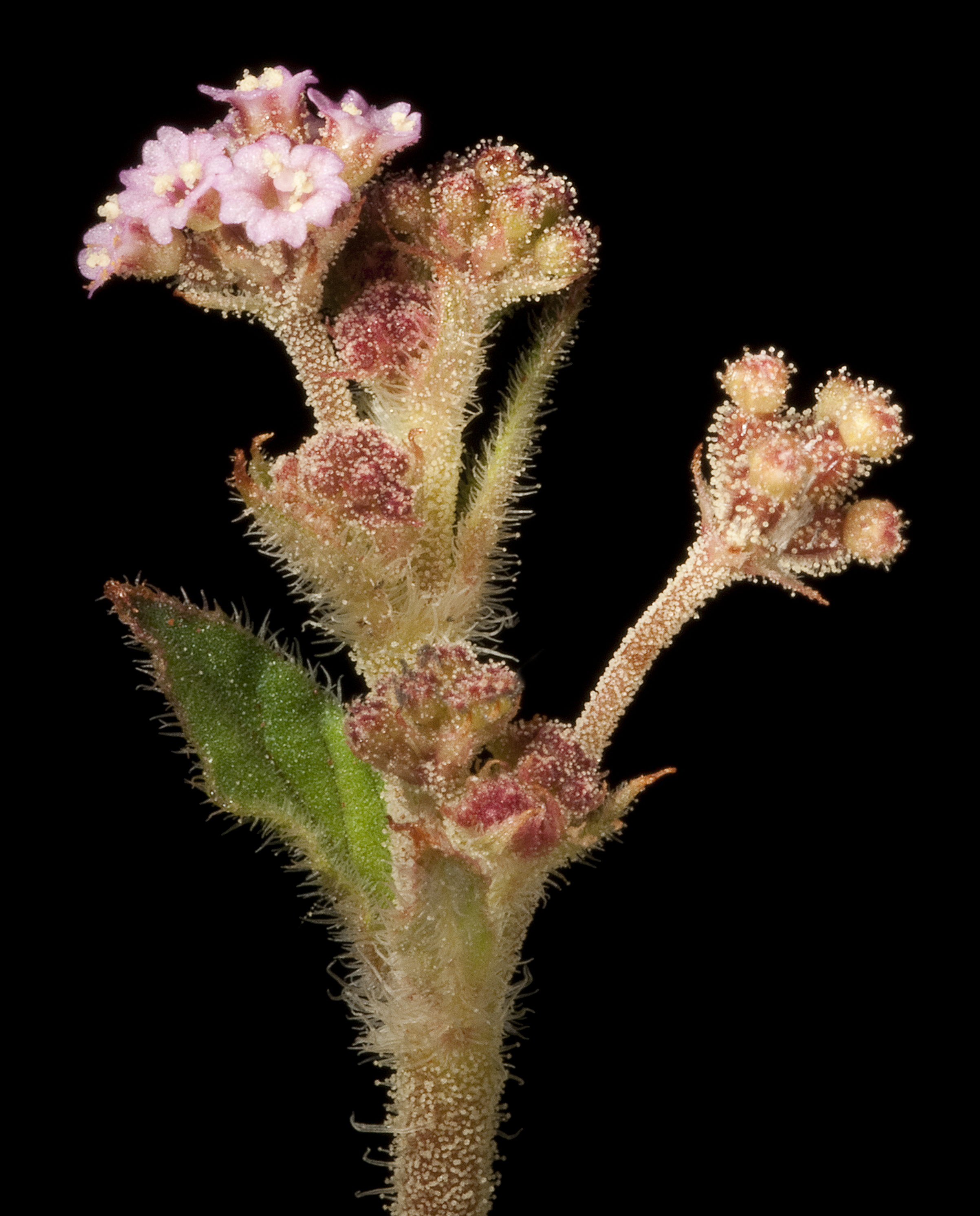
