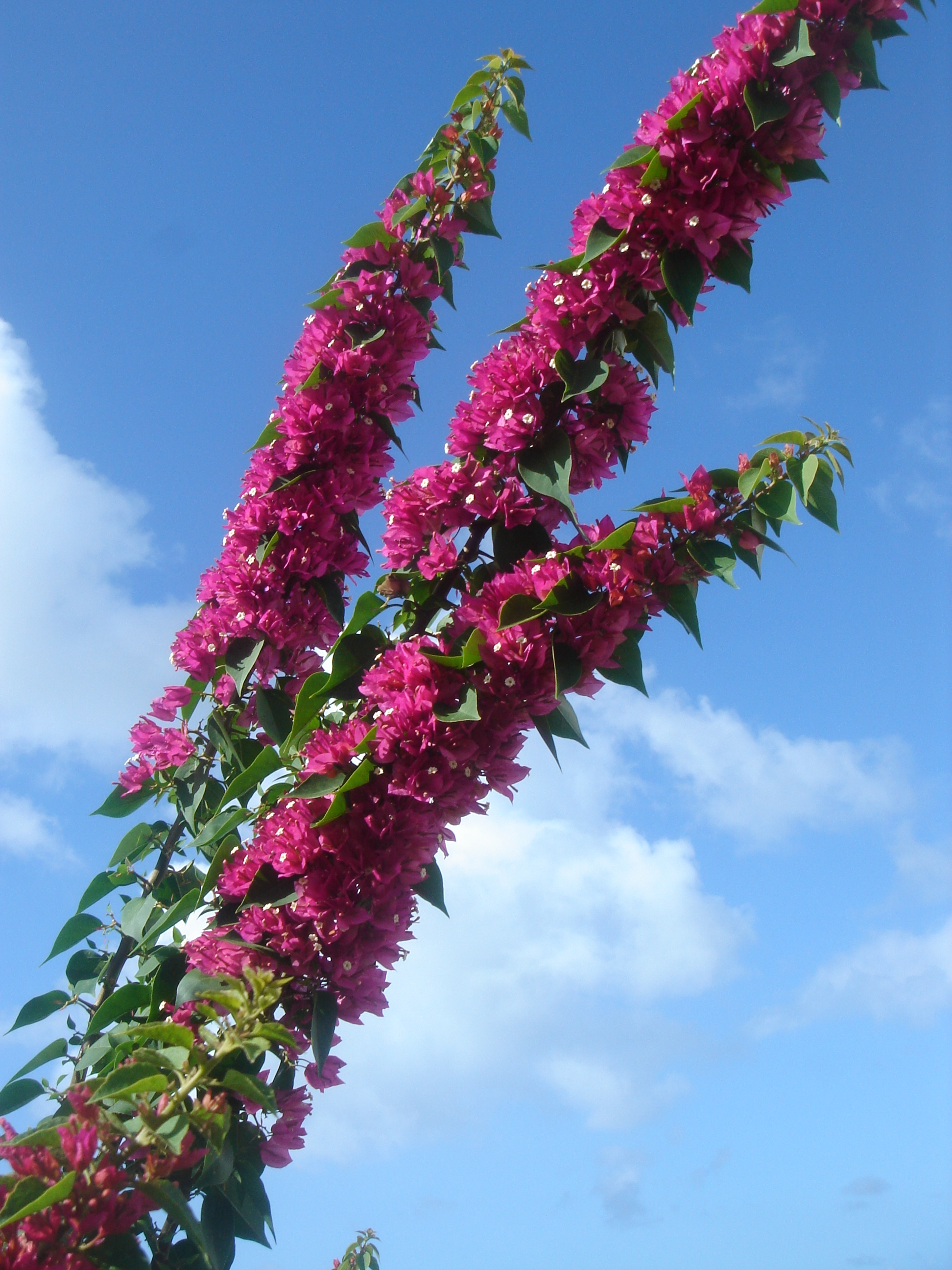

Scientific classification
- Kingdom: Plantae
- Clade: Tracheophytes
- Clade: Angiosperms
- Clade: Eudicots
- Order: Caryophyllales
- Family: Nyctaginaceae
- Genus: Bougainvillea
- Species: B. peruviana

Binomial name
- Bougainvillea peruviana Bonpl.

= Bougainvillea peruviana =

Species of flowering plant

Bougainvillea peruviana, also known as Peru bougainvillea, is a naturally occurring tropical species of the genus Bougainvillea native to Peru, Ecuador, and Bolivia. It is one of the major Bougainvillea species responsible for the vast applications in urban landscaping due to its attractive and colorful bracts.

== Description ==
Bougainvillea peruviana was first described by German naturalist and explorer Alexander Von Humboldt in Peru in 1810. It is noted for its green bark, long thin leaves, rounded magenta-pink bracts, short and straight thorns, yellow flowers, and lanky growth habit. The species is considered to be more stable than two other species in the genus Bougainvillea, B. spectabilis and B. glabra. Typically, B. peruviana blooms several times a year.

== Hybrids ==
The hybrid of B. glabra x B. peruviana is most common among all other bougainvillea hybrids, and has its own hybrid name bougainvillea x buttiana. Discovered by Mrs. R Butt, the key characterstics of this hybrid goes like: large heart - shaped leaves, with slight hairiness on both upper and lower sides, red or dark pink coloured bracts, and striaght and short throns, and just like other bougainvillea species, it also requires regular pruning to show bushy appearance.
