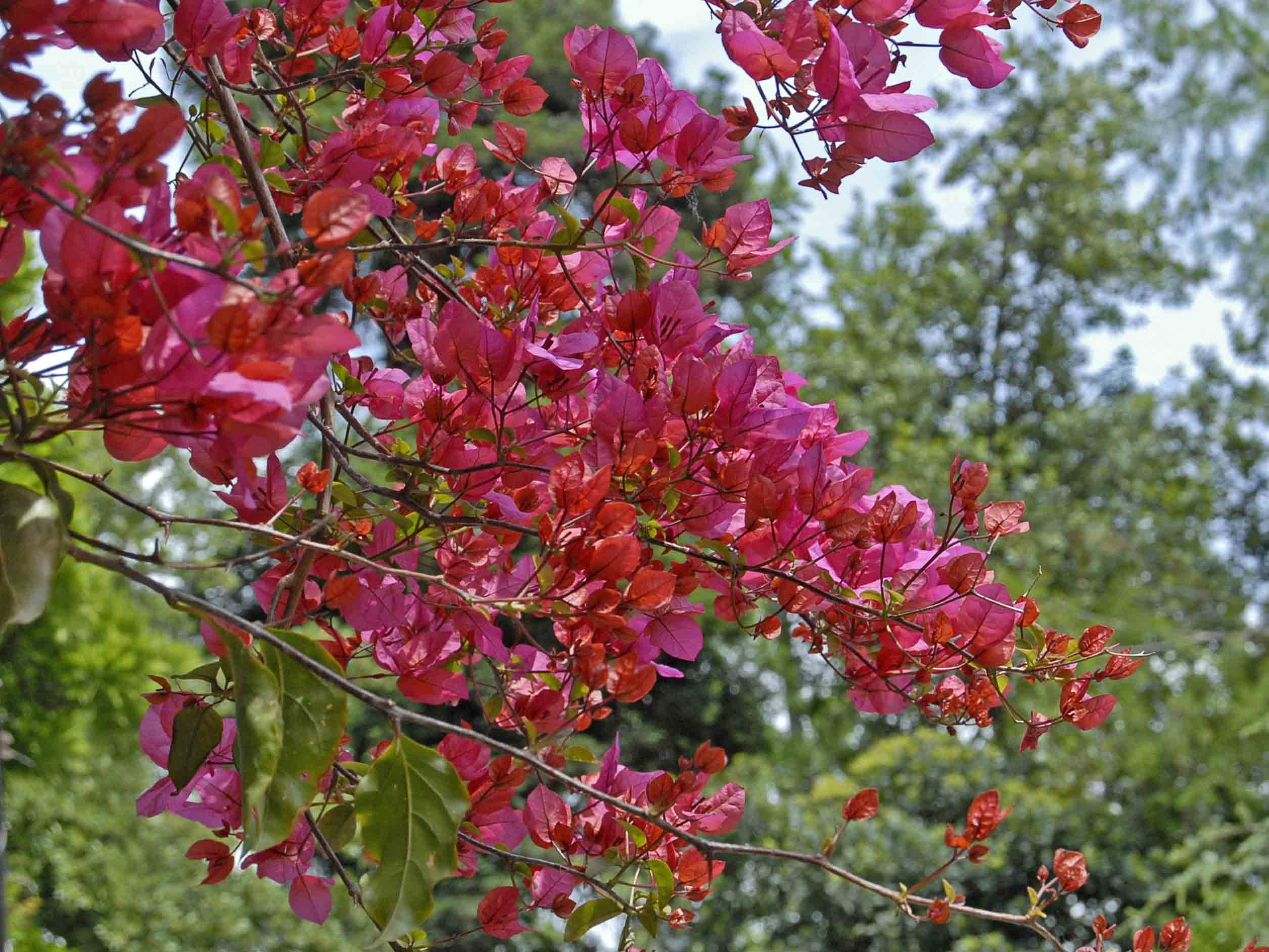
- Orto Botanico dell'Università di Genova

Scientific classification
- Kingdom: Plantae
- Clade: Tracheophytes
- Clade: Angiosperms
- Clade: Eudicots
- Order: Caryophyllales
- Family: Nyctaginaceae
- Genus: Bougainvillea
- Species: B. × buttiana

Binomial name
- Bougainvillea × buttiana Holttum & Standl.

= Bougainvillea × buttiana =

Species of flowering plant

Bougainvillea × buttiana is a flowering plant, a garden hybrid of Bougainvillea glabra and Bougainvillea peruviana.

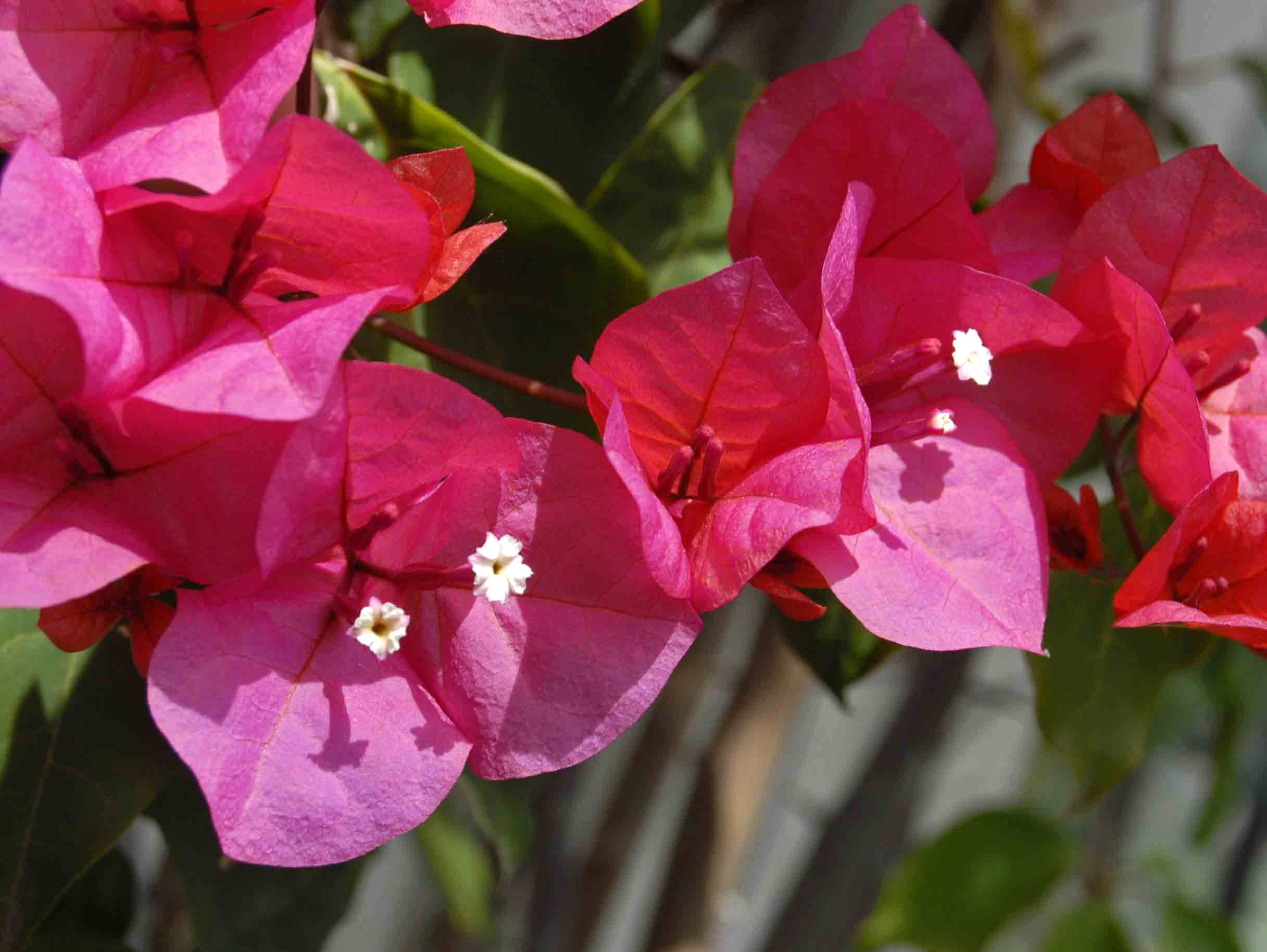
Flower surrounded by bracts

Growing to 5 metres (16 ft) tall by 1.5 metres (4.9 ft) broad, It is an evergreen vine, with thorny stems and tiny trumpet shaped white flowers, usually appearing in clusters surrounded by three showy bright magenta-rose papery bracts. The leaves are ovate and dark green.

This plant can be grown in a warm temperate or subtropical environment where the temperature does not fall below freezing (0 °C (32 °F)), against a south-facing wall in full sun. Numerous cultivars have been developed, of which the following have gained the Royal Horticultural Society's Award of Garden Merit:

- 'Miss Manila'
- 'Mrs Butt'
- 'Poulton's Special'
