= Glendora Bougainvillea =

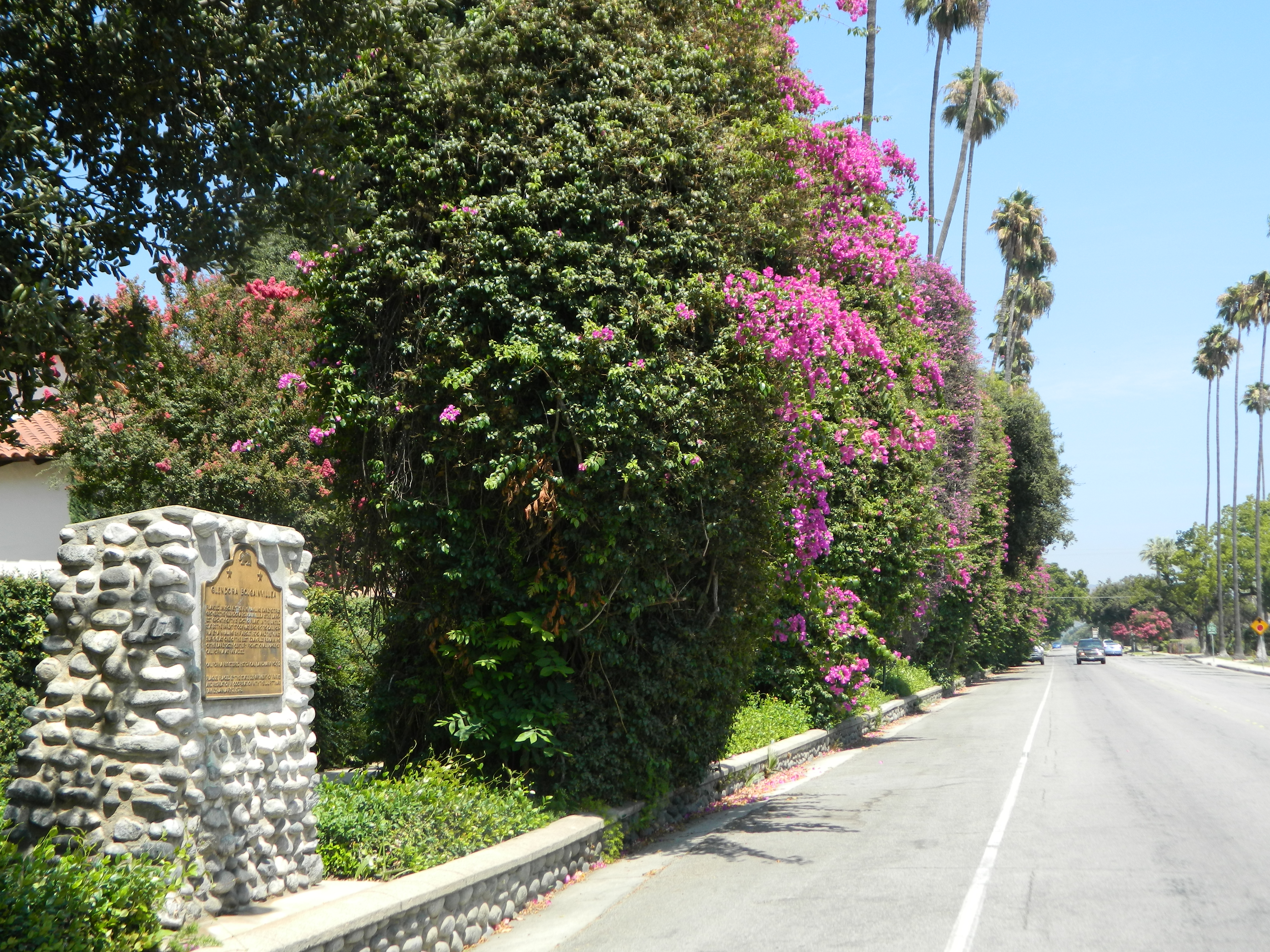
- Part of the Glendora Bougainvillea, with the California Historical Landmark marker in the foreground

- Location within the Los Angeles metropolitan area
- 34°8′23″N 117°51′41″W
- Location: E. Bennett Ave. at N. Minnesota Ave., Glendora, California

History
- Built: 1901

California Historical Landmark
- Designated: October 14, 1977
- Reference no.: 912

U.S. National Register of Historic Places
- Designated: February 7, 1978
- Reference no.: 78000683

The Glendora Bougainvillea, in Glendora, California, is the largest bougainvillea in the United States. The bougainvillea was designated a California Historical Landmark (No. 912) on October 14, 1977, and listed on the National Register of Historic Places on February 7, 1978, as Site #78000683.

The R.H. Hamlins, early citrus growers, planted the bougainvillea in 1901. The bougainvillea vine is growing up 94-foot palm trees. The plant has grown 600 ft (180 m) down Bennett Avenue and also 600 ft (180 m) down Minnesota Avenue. The vine also has grown 1200 feet on both sides of orange trees on the land owned by Dr. and Mrs. L.J. Pittman.

The original parent of the bougainvillea vine arrived in 1870 by a whaling ship. The exact location of the original Glendora Bougainvillea plant is not known.

The California Historical Landmark marker is at 402 East Bennett Avenue. The marker was placed there by the L.J. Pittman family and the State of California in 1977. The bougainvillea's placement on the National Register of Historic Places gives the plant federal protection provided by the Department of the Interior. It also makes the plant eligible for a grant-in-aid under the National Historic Preservation Act of 1966.

The bougainvillea plant is a thorny ornamental vine, native to South America, and can be found from Brazil to Peru and down to Argentina. The plant is named after the first Frenchman to cross the Pacific Ocean, Louis Antoine de Bougainville.

The bougainvillea's peak bloom is in the months of June and July. Two species of bougainvillea are found in Glendora: Bougainvillea glabra and Bougainvillea spectabilis.

== Marker ==
The California Historical Landmark marker on the site reads:

Planted in 1901 by the R.W. Hamlins, early citrus growers, the Glendora bougainvillea is the largest growth of this exotic plant in the United States. The parent stock was brought to California by a whaling ship about 1870, and the vines survive as one of the best examples remaining of the early 20th-century promotional image of California as paradise.

== See also ==
- California Historical Landmarks in Los Angeles County
- Largest Wisteria vine in the world, also in Southern California
