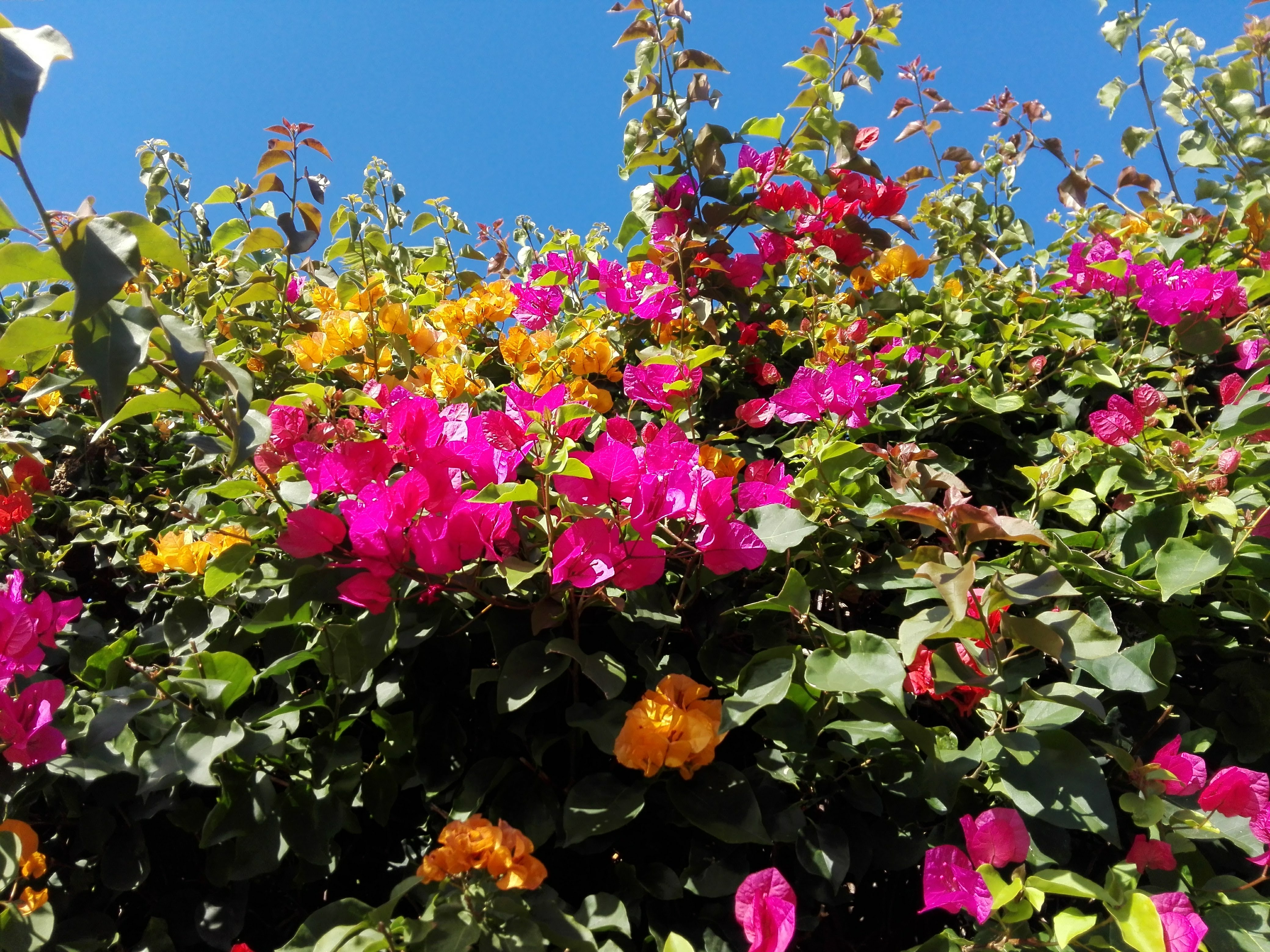

Conservation status
- Least Concern (IUCN 3.1)

Scientific classification
- Kingdom: Plantae
- Clade: Tracheophytes
- Clade: Angiosperms
- Clade: Eudicots
- Order: Caryophyllales
- Family: Nyctaginaceae
- Genus: Bougainvillea
- Species: B. glabra

Binomial name
- Bougainvillea glabra Choisy

Synonyms
- List: Bougainvillea glabra var. typica Heimerl; Bougainvillea spectabilis var. glabra (Choisy) Hook.; Bougainvillea arborea Glaz.; Bougainvillea brachycarpa Heimerl; Bougainvillea formosa W.Bull; Bougainvillea glabra var. acutibracteata Heimerl/small>; Bougainvillea glabra var. alba Mendes & Viégas; Bougainvillea glabra var. brachycarpa (Heimerl) Heimerl; Bougainvillea glabra var. graciliflora Heimerl; Bougainvillea glabra var. obtusibracteata Heimerl; Bougainvillea glabra var. sanderiana Dimmock; Bougainvillea rubicunda Schott ex Rohrb.; Bougainvillea sanderiana (Dimmock) W.Falc.bis

= Bougainvillea glabra =

Species of flowering plant

Bougainvillea glabra, the lesser bougainvillea or paperflower, is the most common species of bougainvillea used for bonsai. The epithet 'glabra' comes from Latin and means "bald".

== Description ==
It is an evergreen, climbing shrub that usually grows 3–3.5 m (10–12 ft) tall, occasionally up to 9 m (30 ft). It features thick, thorny stems and drooping branches that are glabrous or sparsely hairy. The leaves have a 3–10-millimetre-long (1/8–3/8 in) stem. The leaf blade is ovate to ovate-lanceolate, pointed or briefly pointed, 5 to 13 centimeters long and 3 to 6 centimeters wide, sparsely fluffy hairy on the underside and bald on the top. The leaf-like bracts are purple, oblong or elliptical, pointed, 65–90 mm (2 1/2–3 1/2 in) long and about 50 mm (2 in) wide. They tower over the flowers. These grow individually in pairs or in groups of three on flower stems about 3.5 millimeters long.

Raphides have been found in the stem, bracts and different parts of the flower.

=== Inflorescences ===
The crown tube is greenish, clearly angled, about 2 centimeters long, sparsely downy hairy, ribbed and points away from the flower stalk. The tip is lobed five times and forms a short, spread, white or yellowish hem. The six to eight stamens have 8 to 13 millimeter long stamens. The ovary is about 2 millimeters long, the stylus 1 millimeter and the scar 2.5 millimeters.

Tiny white flowers usually appear in clusters surrounded by colorful papery bracts, hence the name paperflower. The leaves are dark green, variable in shape, up to 100 mm (4 in) long. The flowers are about 0.4 cm (0.16 in) in diameter (the pink petal-like structures are not petals, but bracts).

== Cultivation ==
B. glabra is heat and drought tolerant and frost sensitive. It is easily propagated by cuttings. It needs full sunlight, warm weather and well drained soil to flower well. The species is often used in culture, in areas with frost in glass houses, otherwise outdoors. The similar Bougainvillea spectabilis, which differs from Bougainvillea glabra by the velvety-felty underside of the leaves, is also cultivated, but less frequently.

=== Uses ===
Being of medical importance, the infusion of the plant's tender leaves and bracts is used orally to treat gastrointestinal problems (diarrhoea, stomach pain), and respiratory conditions (asthma, bronchitis, catarrh, chest pain, fever, pneumonia, whooping cough).

== Gallery ==
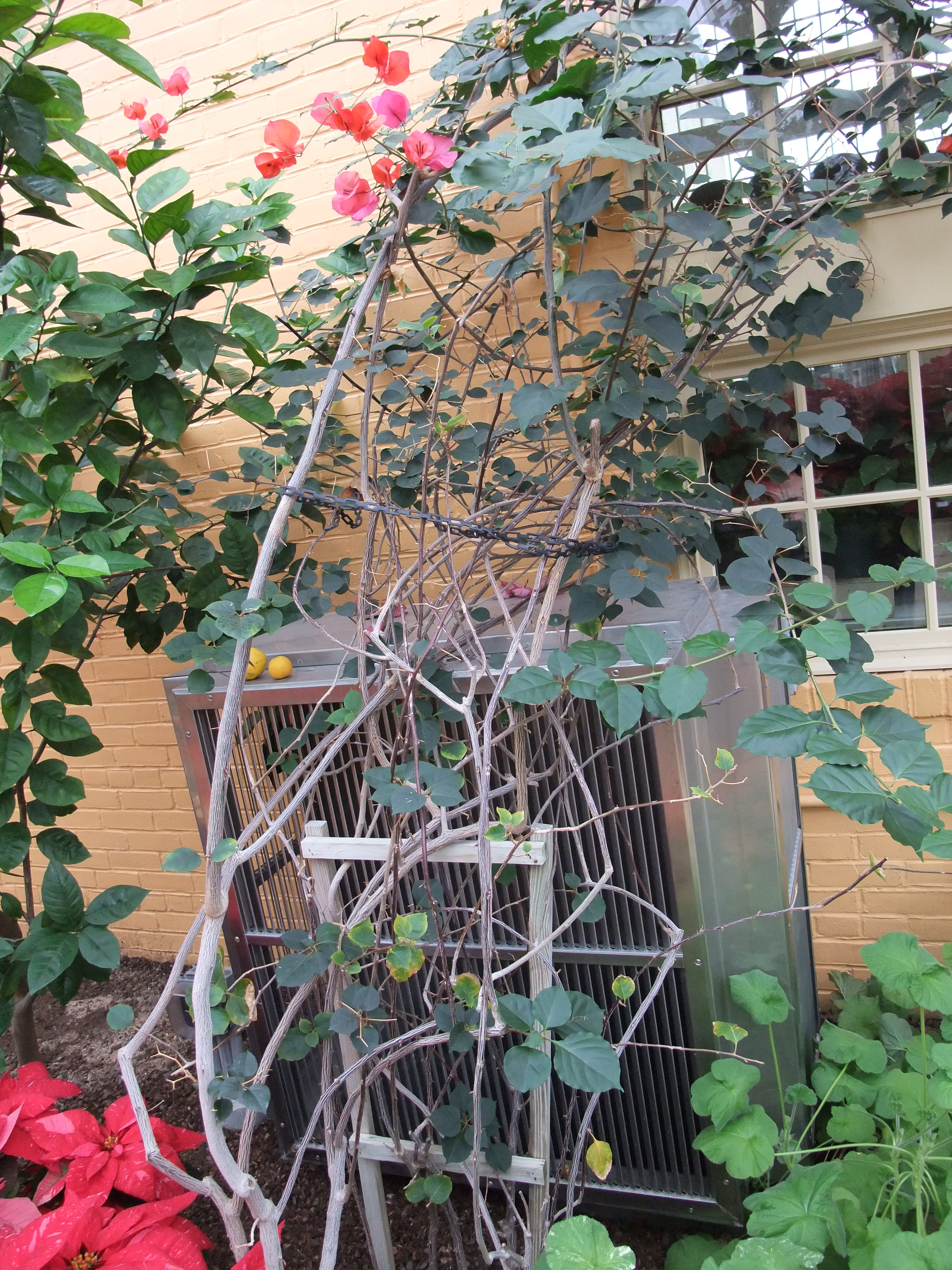
Vine

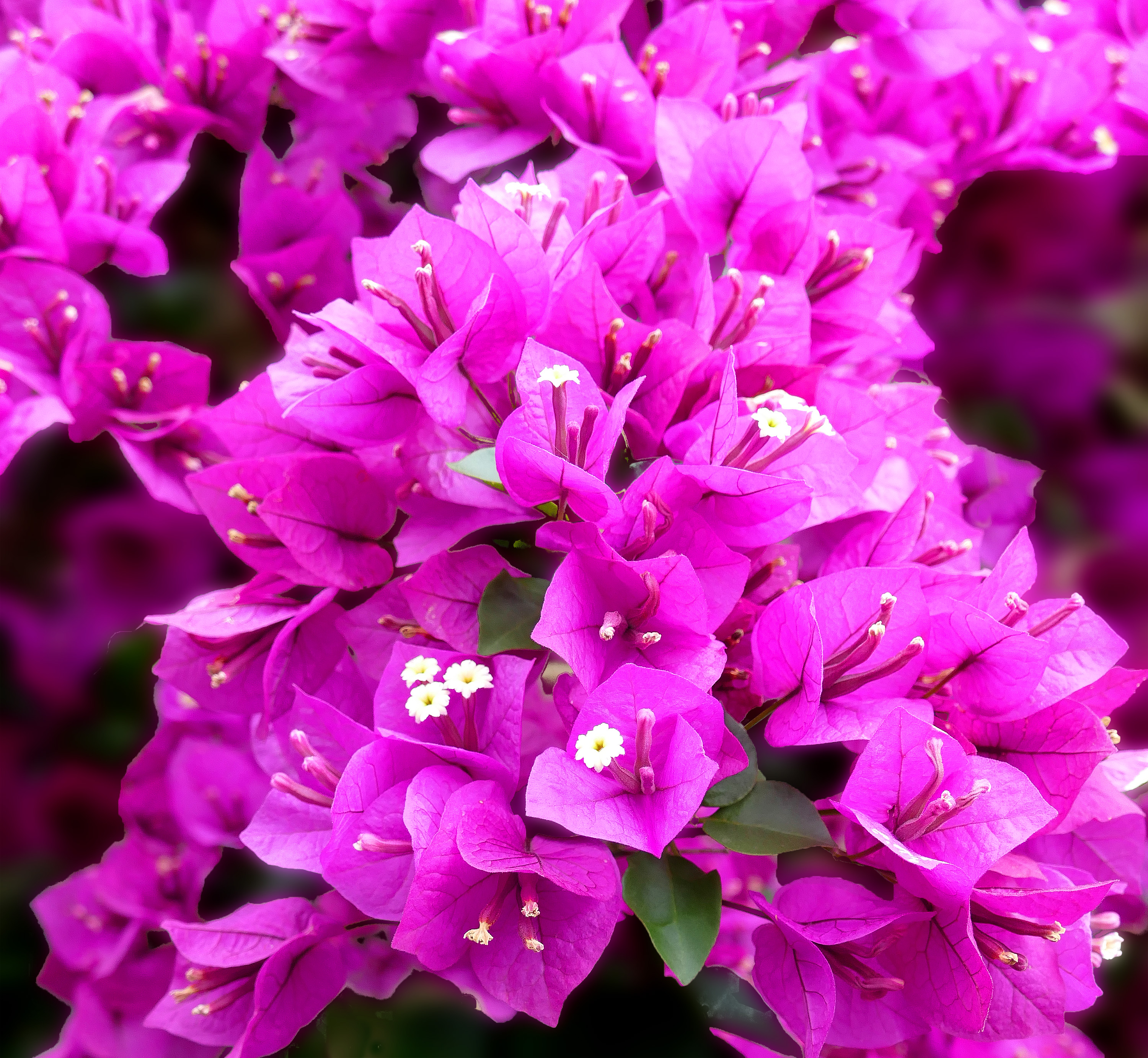
Paperflower—Bougainvillea glabra

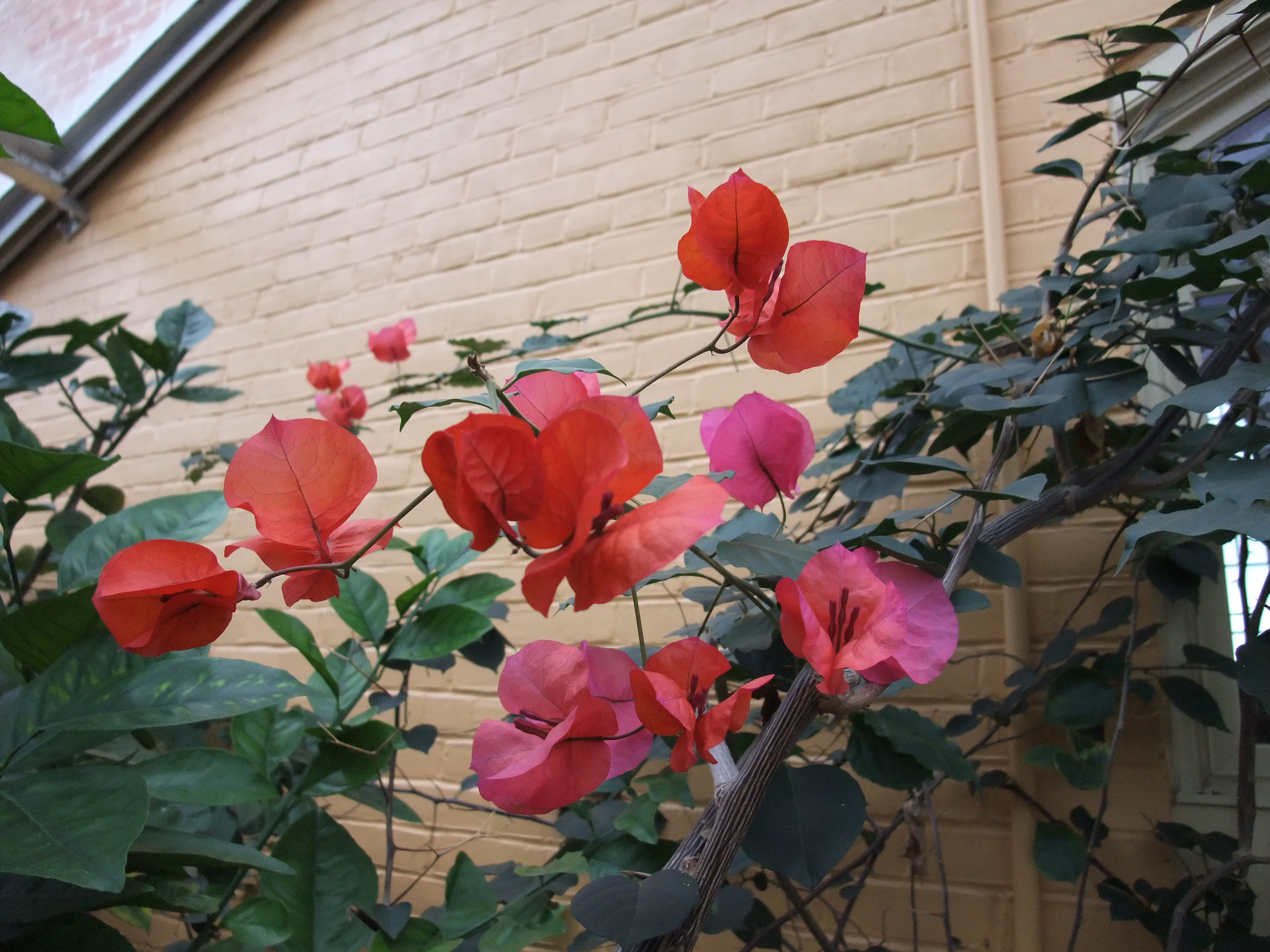
Flowers

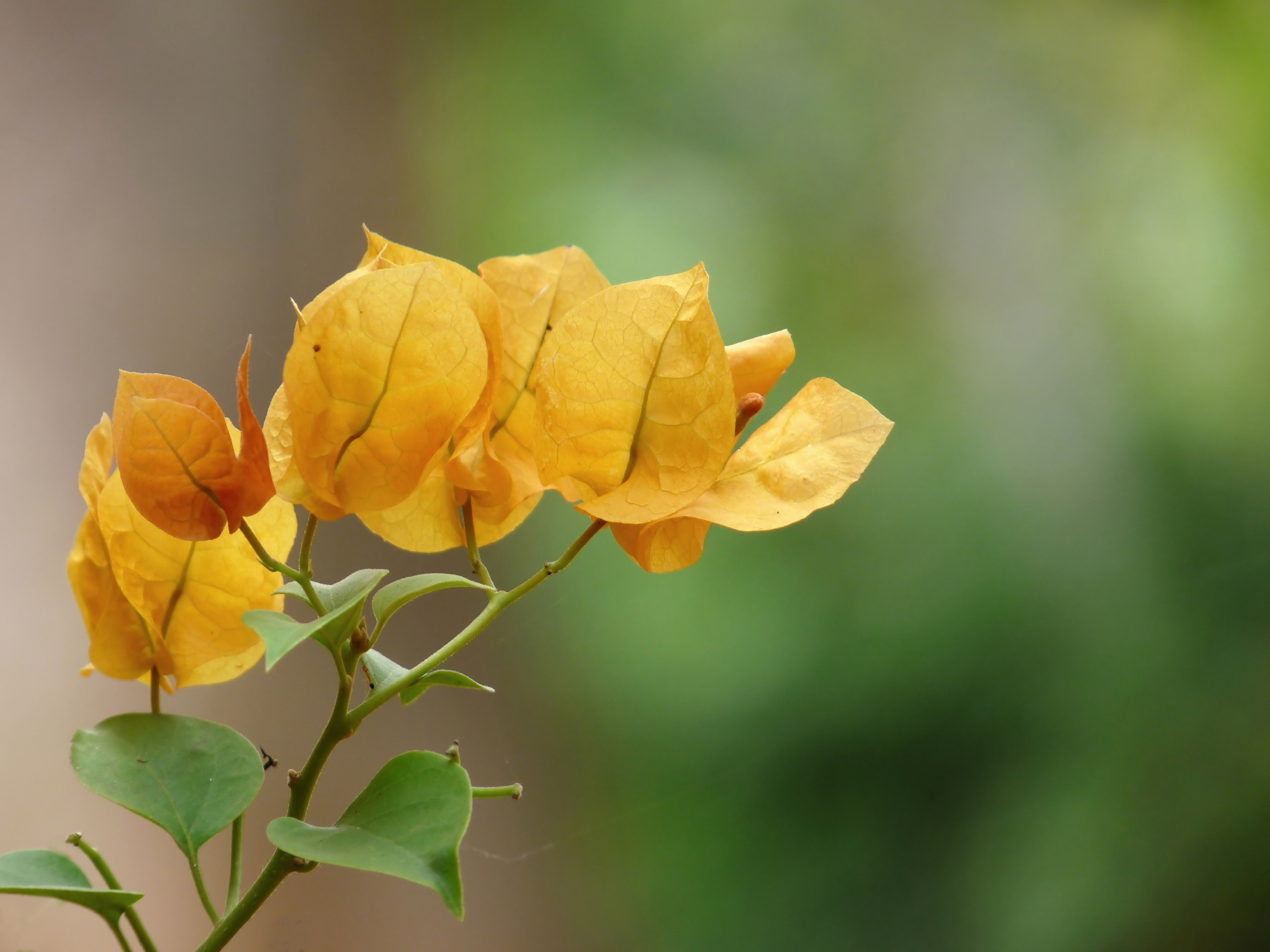
Bougainvillea glabra with yellow bracts

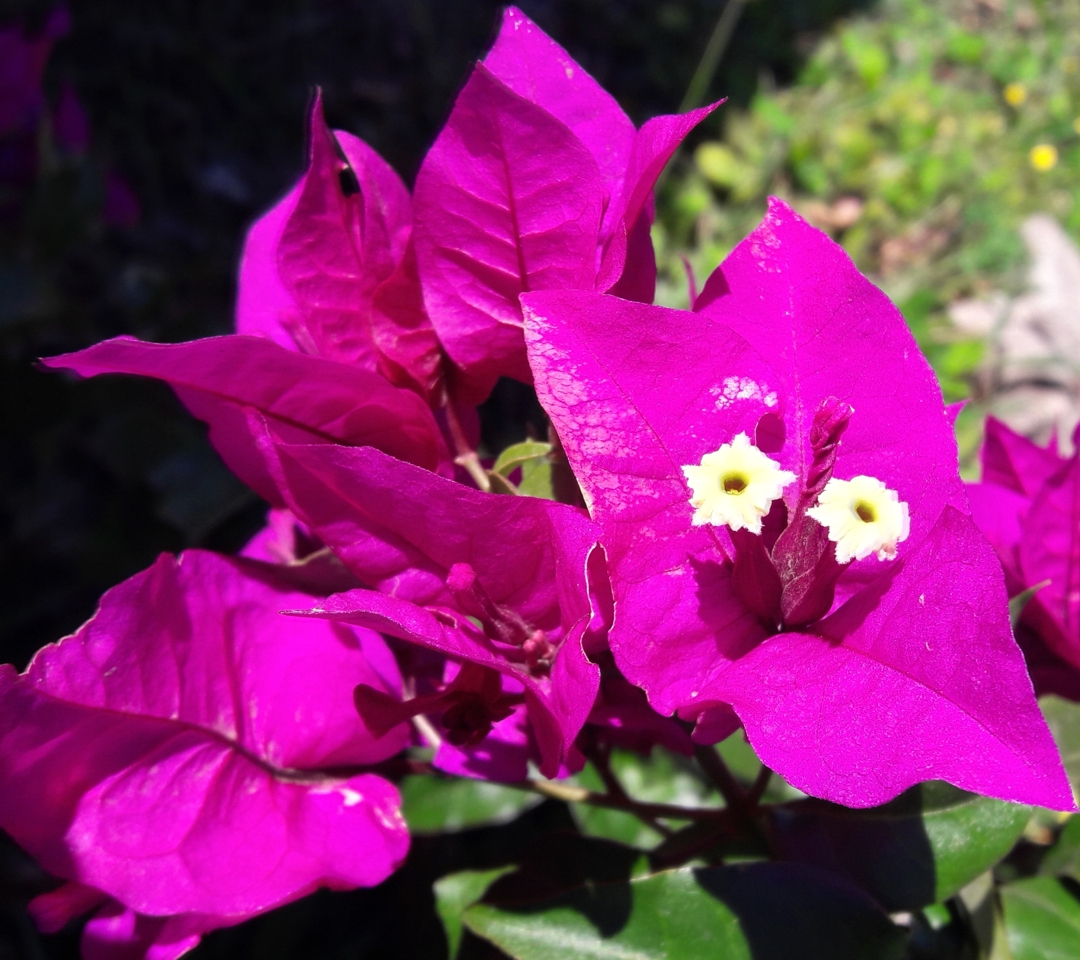
True flower of B. glabra (in pale yellow) surrounded by bright magenta-colored bracts. A wide range of colorations exists.

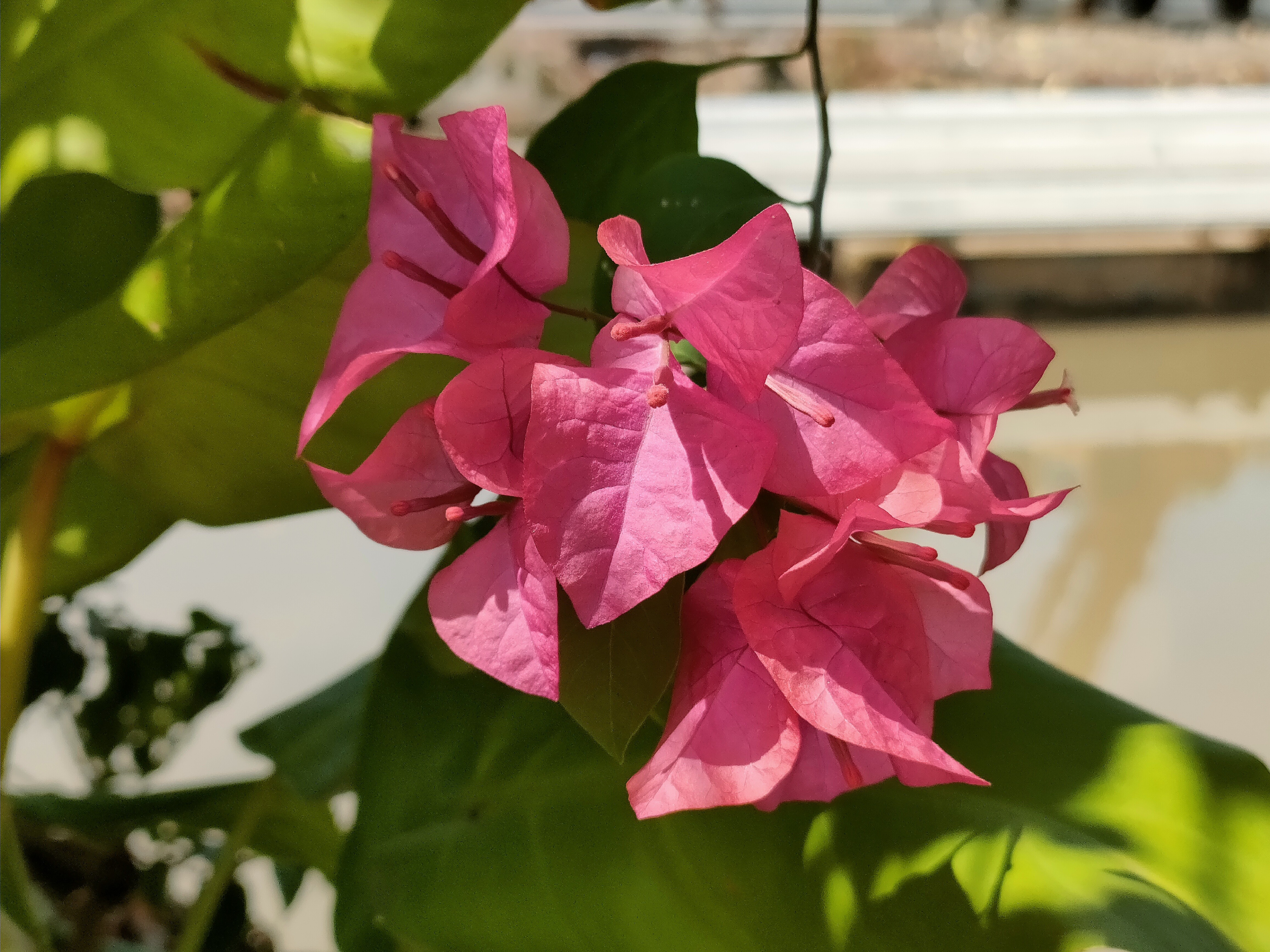
Multiple paperflowers on a shrub

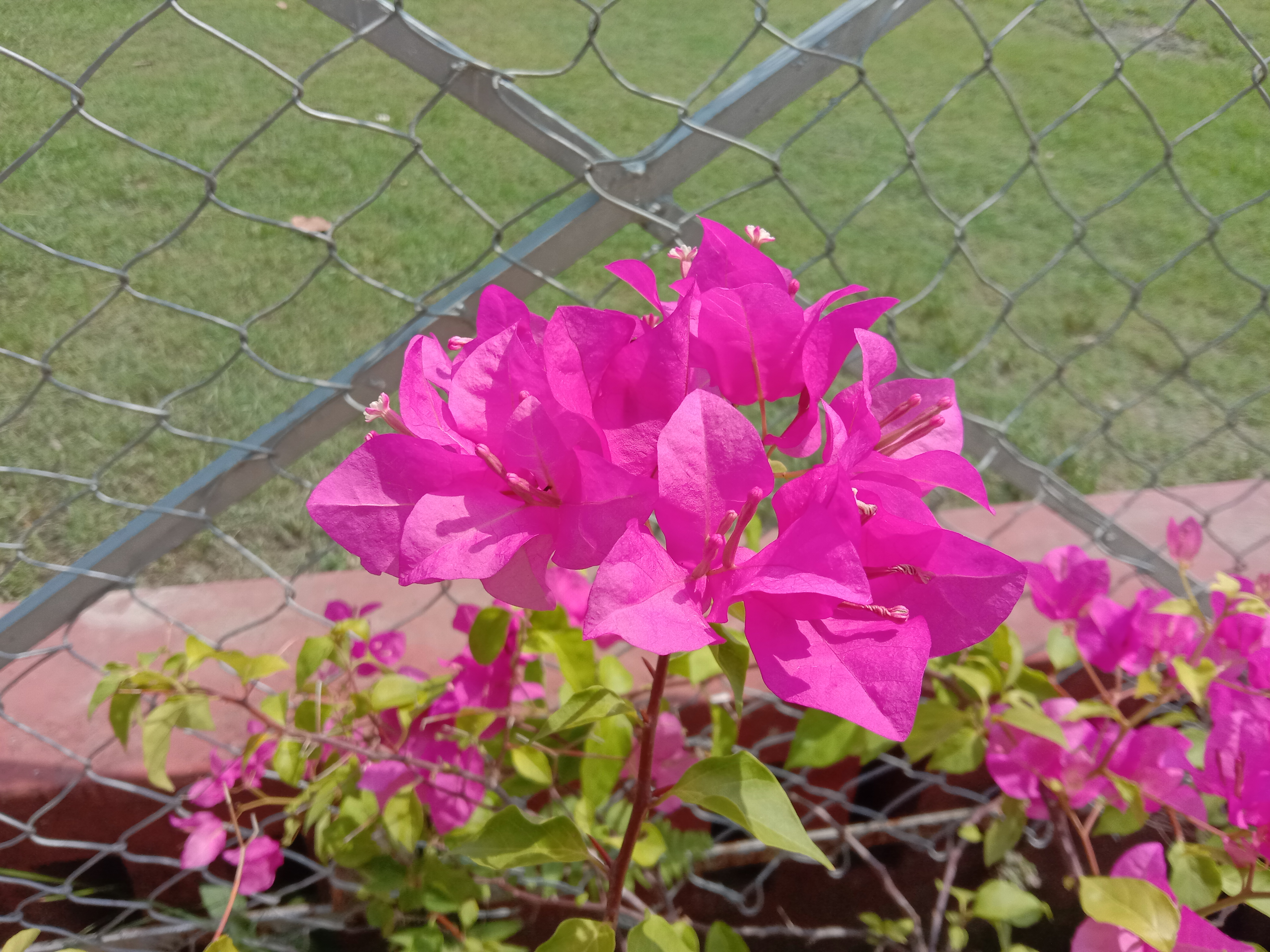
Bougainvillea glabra or paperflower, captured in West Bengal, India

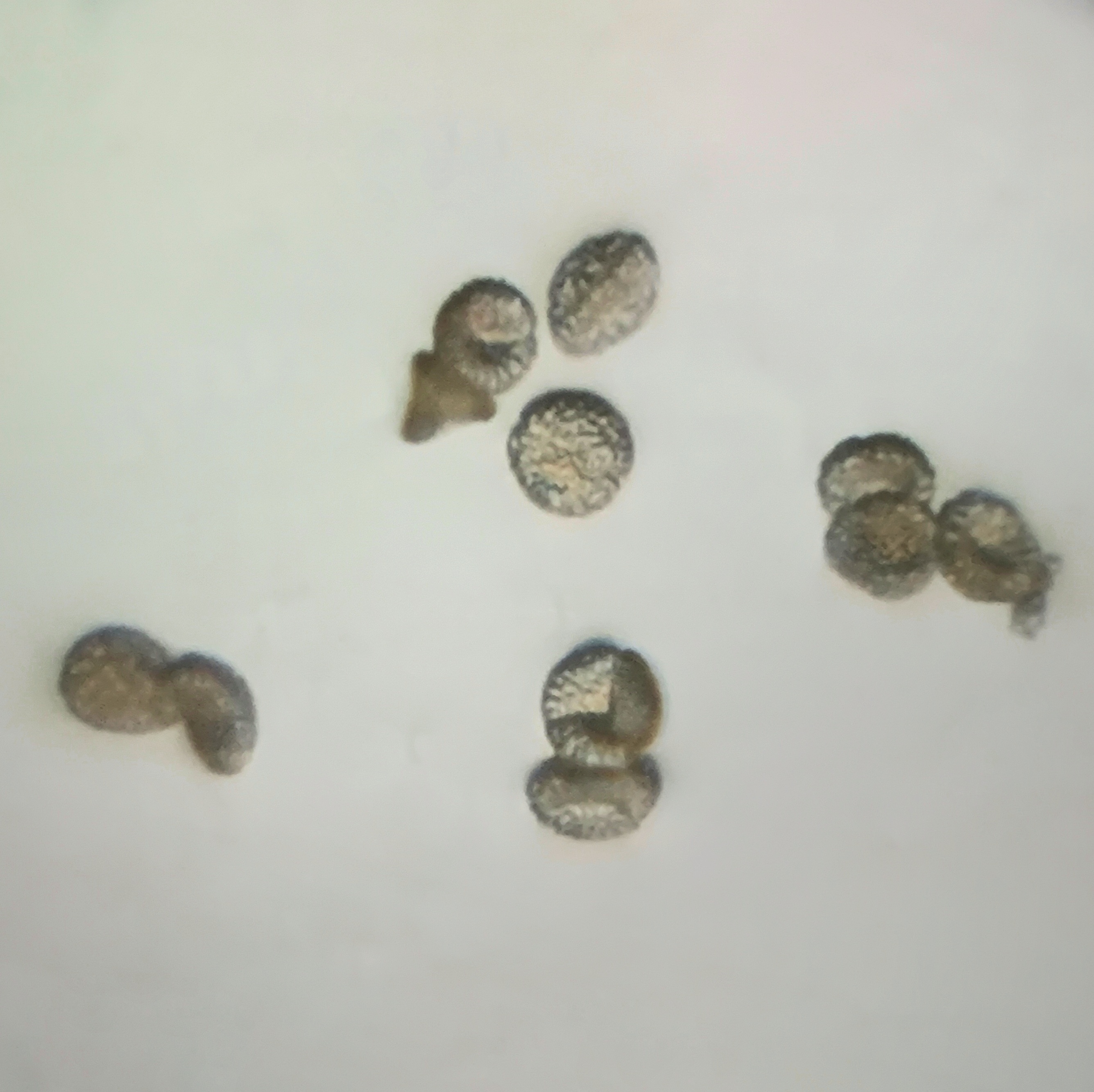
Pollen grains of Bougainvillea glabra from Mumbai

== See also ==
- Glendora bougainvillea

== Bibliography ==
- Gulliver, George (1864). "Observations on Raphides and other Crystals". The Annals and Magazine of Natural History, Including Zoology, Botany, and Geology. Third Series. 14: 250–252.
