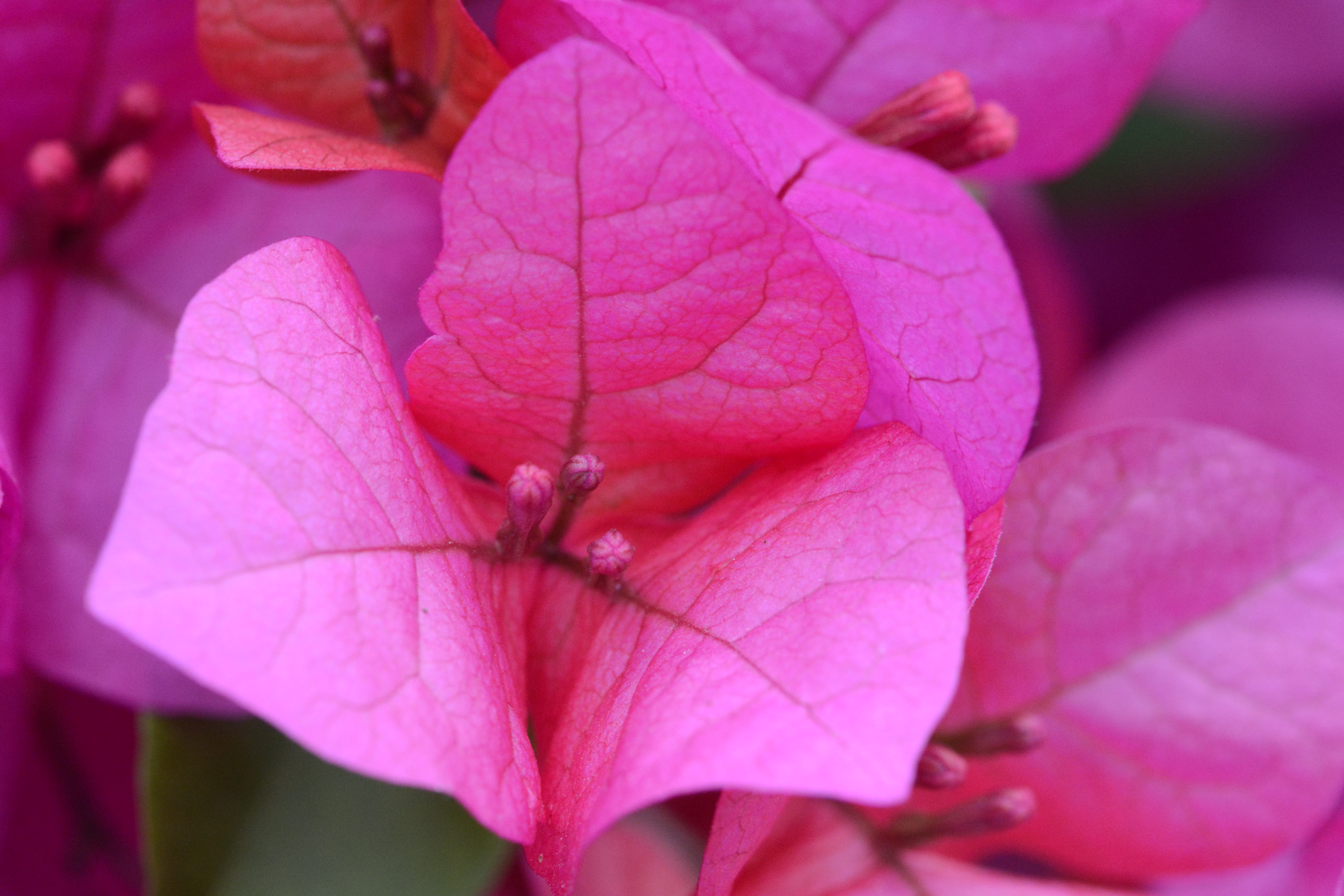
- Bougainvillea spectabilis found in Damauli, Nepal
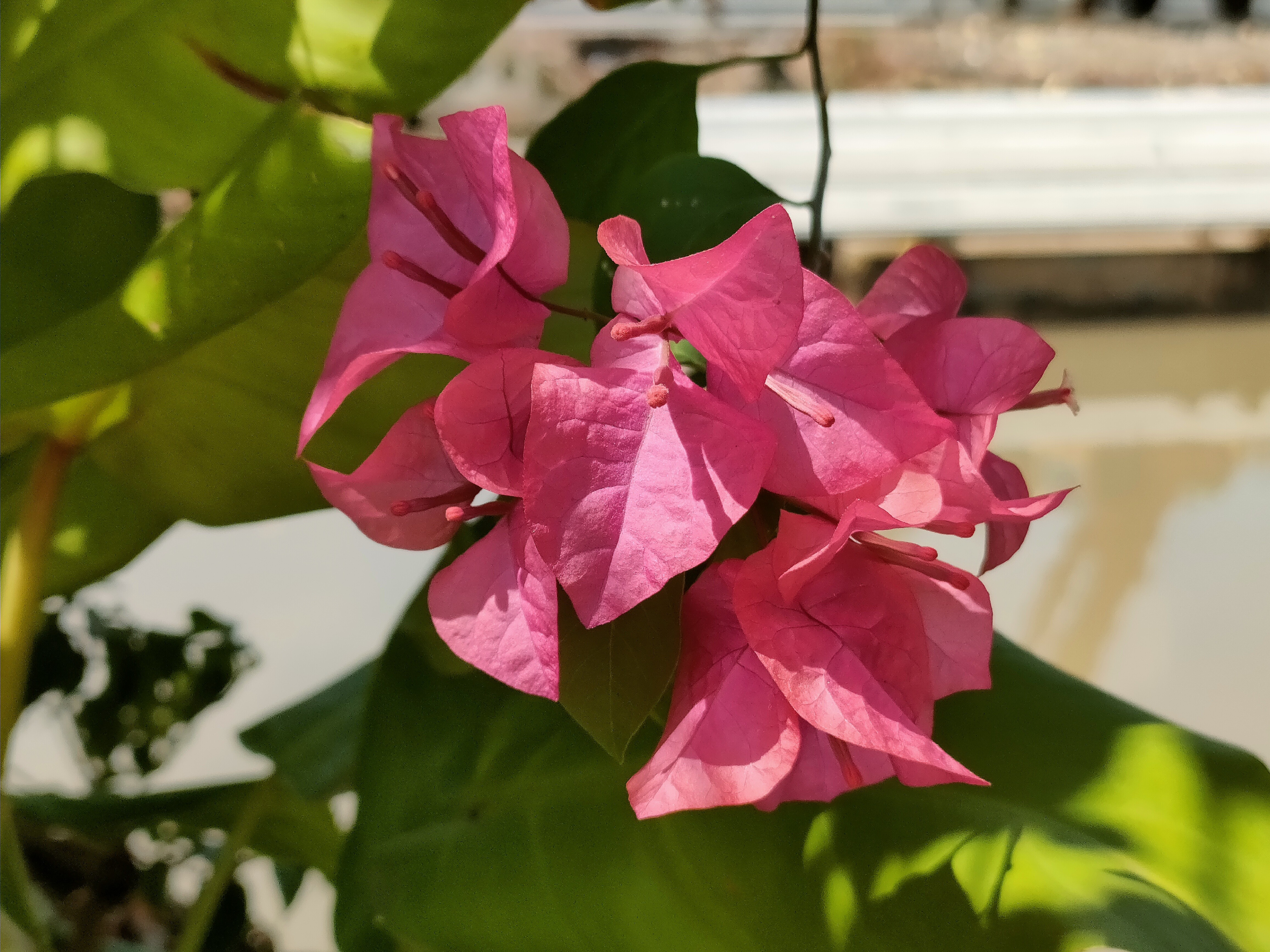
- Bougainvillea glabra found in Jakarta, Indonesia

Scientific classification
- Kingdom: Plantae
- Clade: Tracheophytes
- Clade: Angiosperms
- Clade: Eudicots
- Order: Caryophyllales
- Family: Nyctaginaceae
- Tribe: Bougainvilleae
- Genus: Bougainvillea; Comm. ex Juss.

Species
- See text

Synonyms
- Tricycla Cav.

= Bougainvillea =

Genus of plants

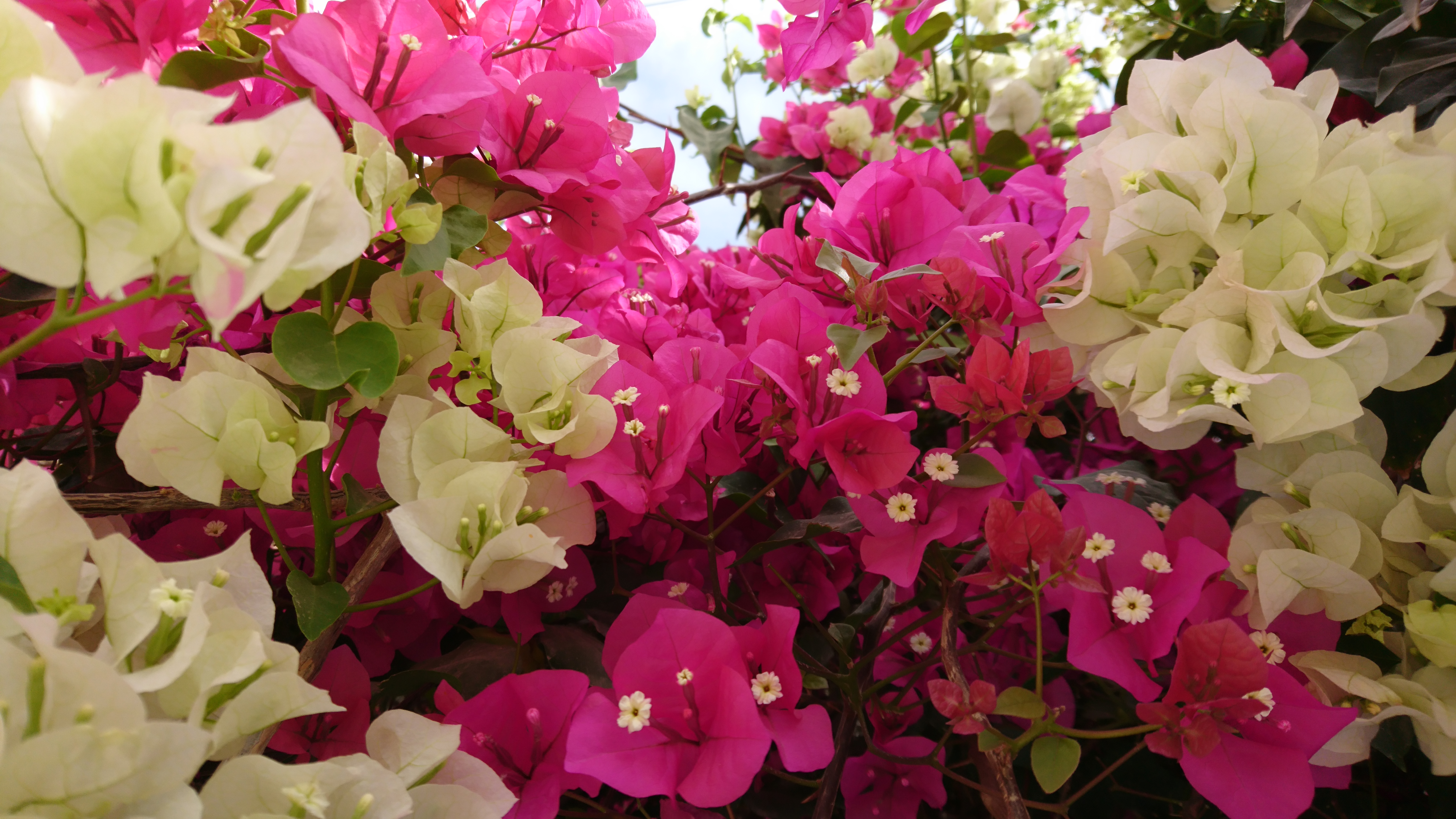
Bougainvillea, Behbahan. Many of the small white flowers, in various stages of development, may be seen among the larger bracts.

Bougainvillea (/ˌbuːɡənˈvɪli.ə/ BOO-gən-VIL-ee-ə, US also /ˌboʊ-/ BOH-) is a genus of thorny ornamental vines, bushes, and trees belonging to the family Nyctaginaceae. They are native to the tropical forests of South America (specifically Colombia, Brazil, Bolivia, Paraguay, Peru, Uruguay and Argentina). There are between 4 and 22 species in the genus. The inflorescence consists of large colorful sepal-like bracts which surround three simple waxy flowers, gaining popularity for the plant as an ornamental. The plant is named after explorer Louis Antoine de Bougainville (1729–1811), after it was documented on one of his expeditions.

== Description ==
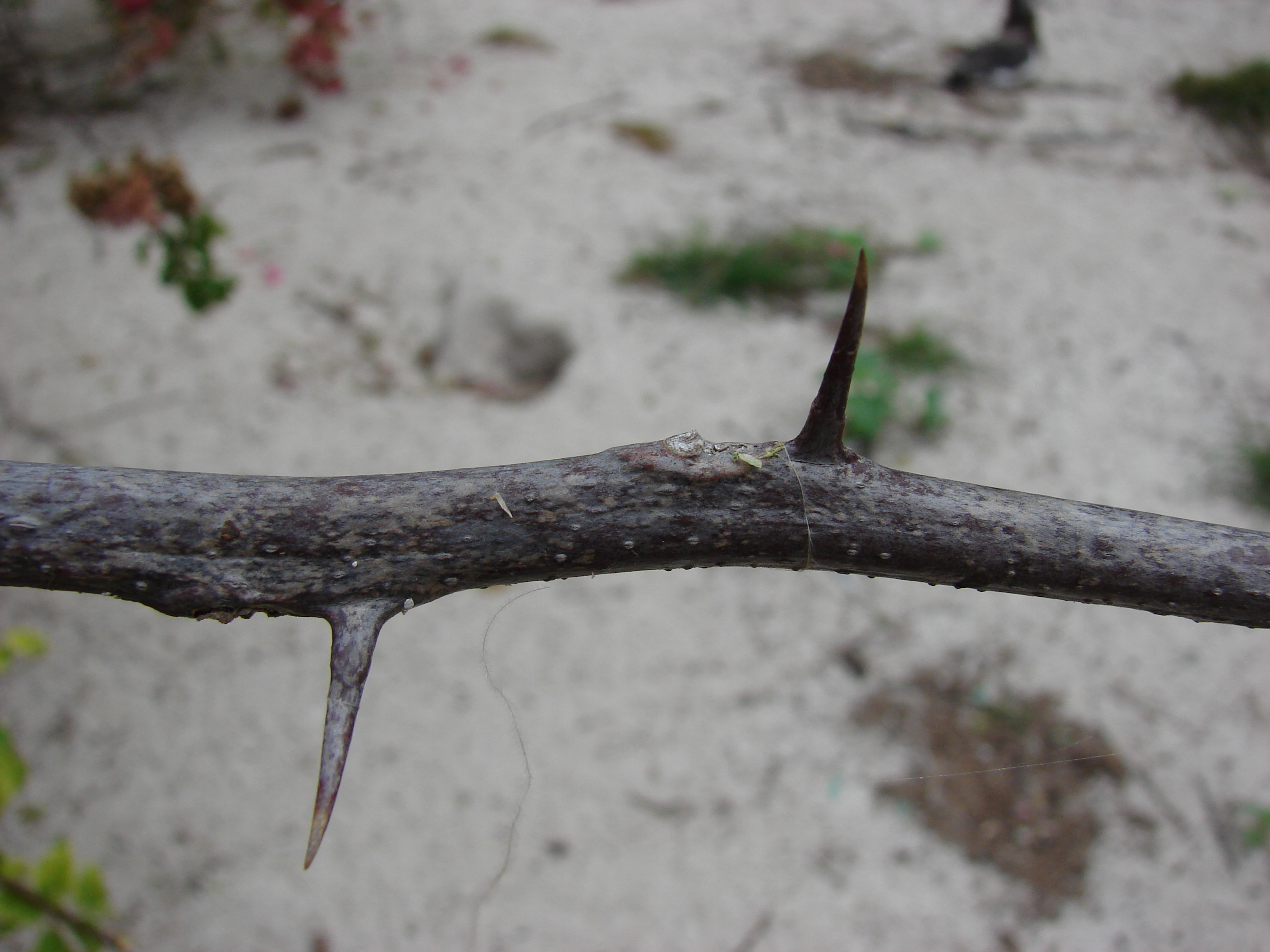
Close-up photo of Bougainvillea spectabilis in Hawaii, showing thorns

The species grows 1 to 12 metres (3 to 39 ft) tall, scrambling over other plants with their spiky thorns. They are evergreen where rainfall occurs all year, or deciduous if there is a dry season. The leaves are alternate, simple ovate-acuminate, 4–13 cm (1.6–5.1 in) long and 2–6 cm (0.79–2.4 in) broad. The actual flower of the plant is small and generally white, but each cluster of three flowers is surrounded by three or six bracts with the bright colours associated with the plant, including pink, magenta, purple, red, orange, white, or yellow. Bougainvillea glabra is sometimes called "paper flower" because its bracts are thin and papery. The fruit is a narrow five-lobed achene.

== History ==
The first European to describe these plants was Philibert Commerçon, a botanist accompanying French Navy admiral Louis Antoine de Bougainville during his voyage of circumnavigation of the Earth, and first published by Antoine Laurent de Jussieu in 1789.

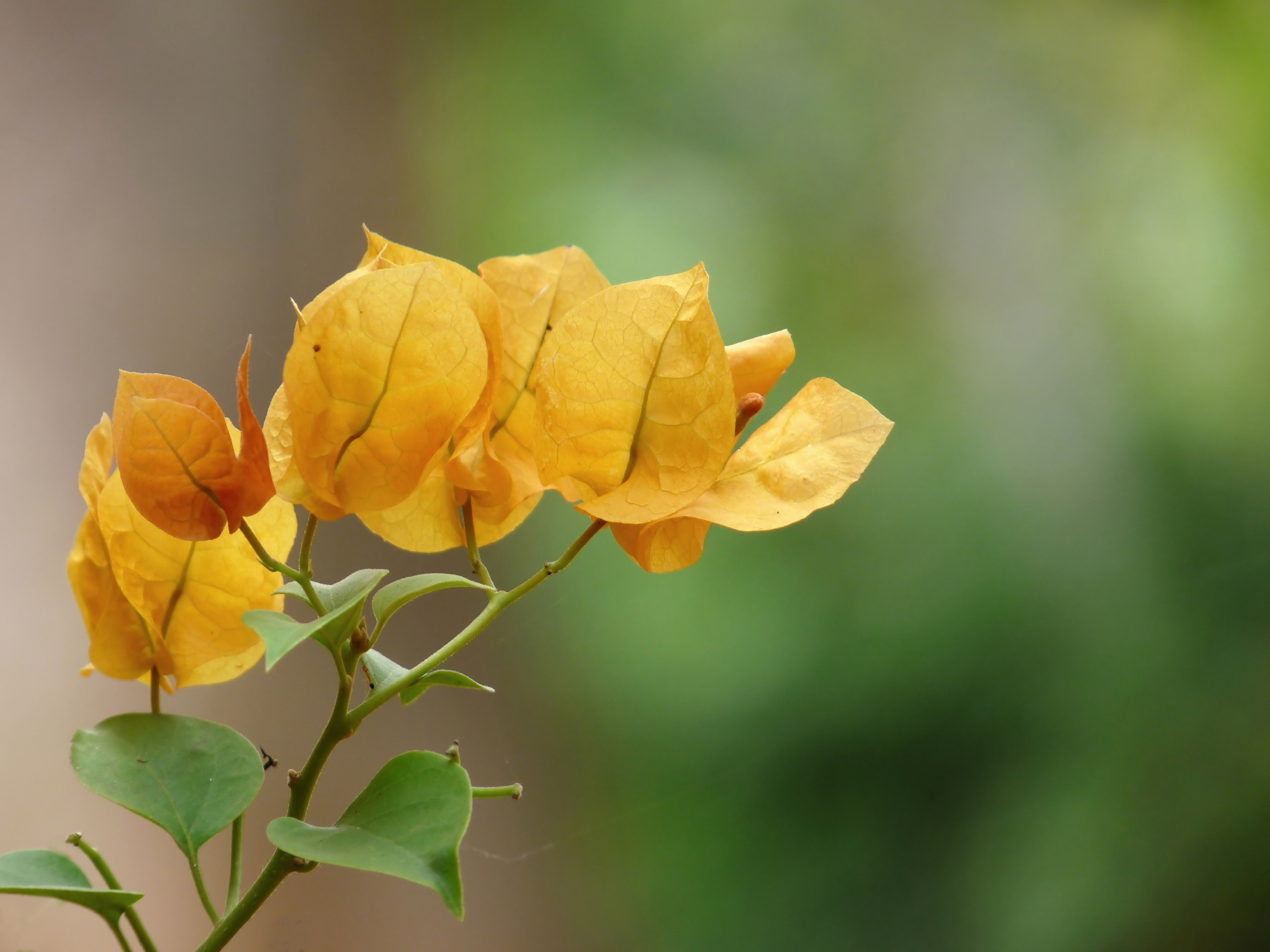
Bougainvillea glabra in Kerala

Twenty years after Commerçon's description, it was first published as 'Buginvillæa' in Genera Plantarum by A. L. de Jussieu in 1789. The genus was subsequently spelled in several ways until it was finally established as "Bougainvillea" in the Index Kewensis in the 1930s. Originally, B. spectabilis and B. glabra were undifferentiated until the mid-1980s when botanists classified them as distinct species. In the early 19th century, these two species were the first to be introduced into Europe, and soon nurseries in France and Britain sold these varieties in Australia and throughout their former colonies. Meanwhile, Kew Gardens distributed plants it had propagated to British colonies throughout the world. Soon thereafter, a crimson specimen in Cartagena, Colombia was added to the genus descriptions. Originally thought to be a distinct species, it was named B. buttiana in honor of the European who first encountered it. However, later studies classified it as a natural hybrid of a variety of B. glabra and possibly B. peruviana—a "local pink bougainvillea" from Peru. Natural hybrids were soon found to be common occurrences all over the world. For instance, around the 1930s, when the three species were grown together, many hybrid crosses were produced almost spontaneously in East Africa, India, the Canary Islands, Australia, North America, and the Philippines.

== Cultivation and uses ==
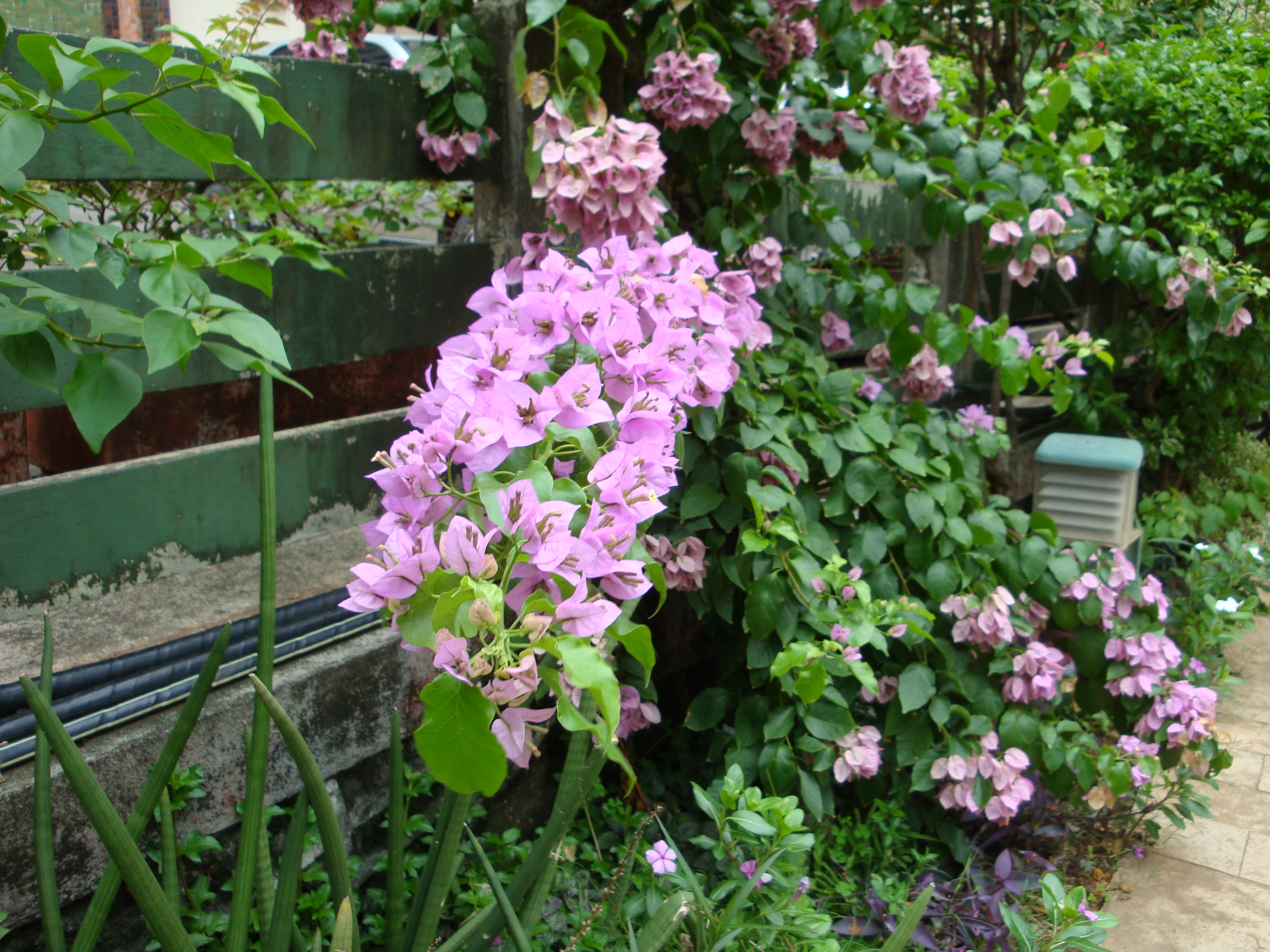
A "stick" of pink bougainvillea

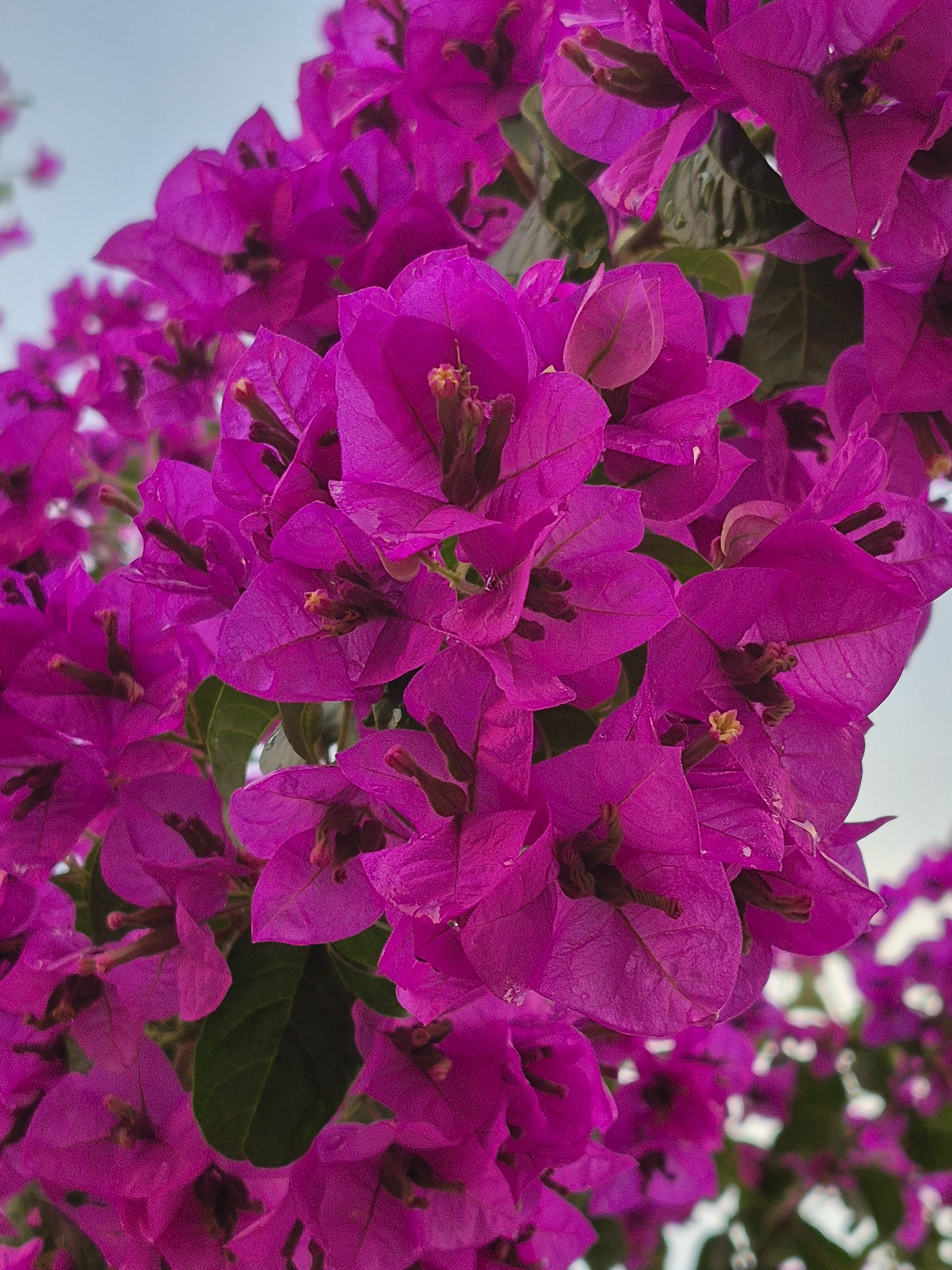
Bougainvillea sp. in Brazil

Bougainvillea are popular ornamental plants in most areas with warm climates, including Florida, South Carolina, South India, California, and across the Mediterranean Basin.

Although it is frost-sensitive and hardy in USDA Hardiness Zones 9b and 10, bougainvillea can be used as a houseplant or hanging basket in cooler climates. In the landscape, it makes an excellent hot season plant, and its drought tolerance makes it ideal for warm climates year-round. Its high salt tolerance makes it a natural choice for color in coastal regions. It can be pruned into a standard, but is also grown along fence lines, on walls, in containers and hanging baskets, and as a hedge or an accent plant. Its long arching thorny branches bear heart-shaped leaves and masses of papery bracts in white, pink, orange, purple, and burgundy. Many cultivars, including double-flowered and variegated, are available.

Many bougainvillea today are the result of interbreeding among only three out of the eighteen South American species recognized by botanists. There are over 300 varieties of bougainvillea. Because many of the hybrids have been crossed over several generations, it is difficult to identify their respective origins. Natural mutations seem to occur spontaneously throughout the world; wherever large numbers of plants are being produced, bud-sports will occur. This had led to multiple names for the same cultivar (or variety) and has added to the confusion over the names of bougainvillea cultivars.

The growth rate of bougainvillea varies from slow to rapid, depending on the variety. They tend to flower all year round in equatorial regions. Elsewhere, they are seasonal, with bloom cycles typically four to six weeks. Bougainvillea grow best in dry soil, in very bright full sun and with frequent fertilisation; but they require little water once established, and in fact will not flourish if over-watered. They can be easily propagated via tip cuttings.

Bougainvillea is also a very attractive genus for Bonsai enthusiasts, due to their ease of training and their radiant flowering during the spring. They can be kept as indoor houseplants in temperate regions and kept small by bonsai techniques.

B. × buttiana is a garden hybrid of B. glabra and B. peruviana. It has produced numerous garden-worthy cultivars.

The cultivars 'San Diego Red' and 'Mary Palmer's Enchantment' have gained the Royal Horticultural Society's Award of Garden Merit. Bougainvillea are relatively pest-free plants, but they may be susceptible to worms, snails and aphids. The larvae of some Lepidoptera species also use them as food plants, for example the giant leopard moth (Hypercompe scribonia).

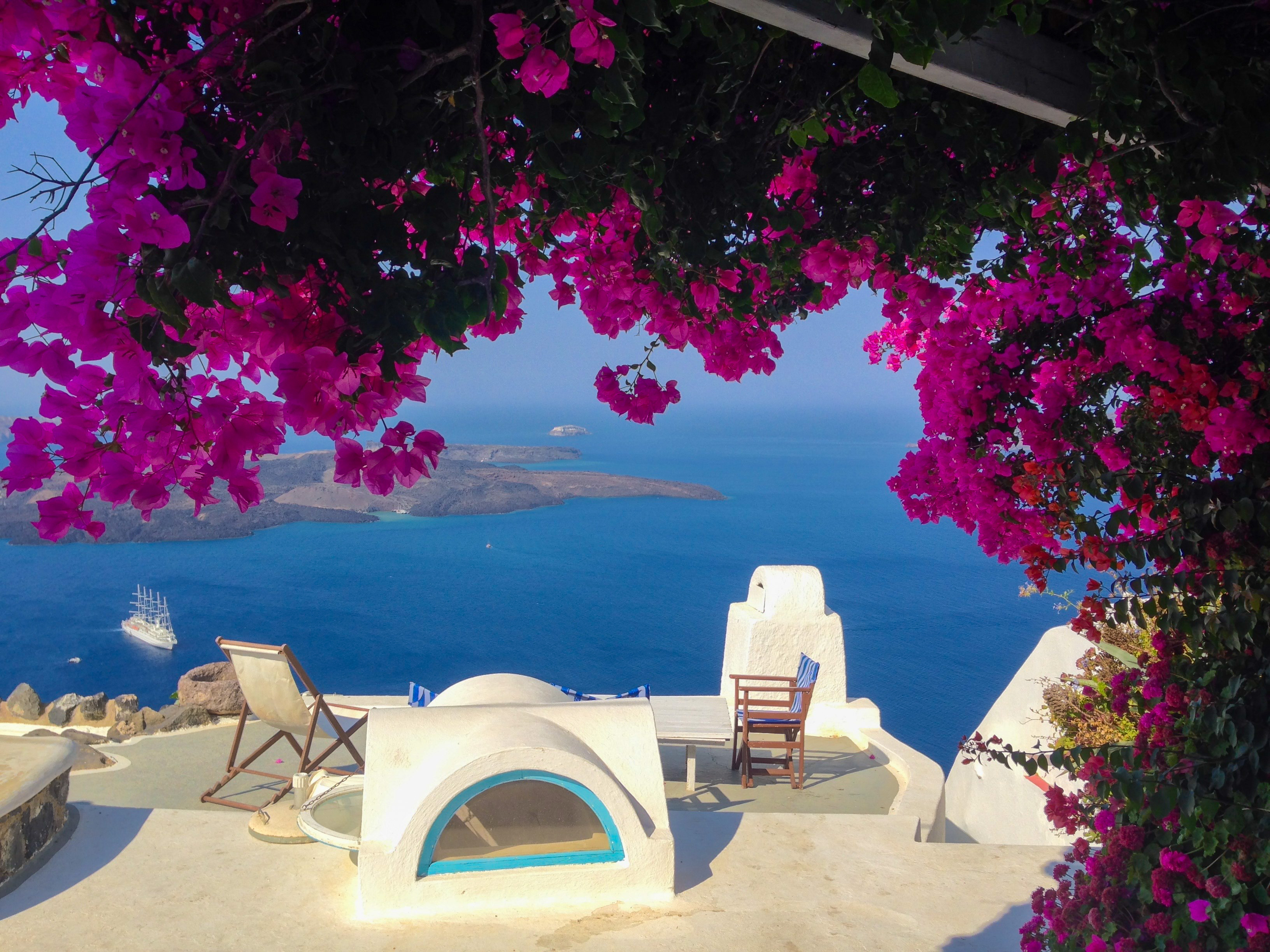
Its low water requirements make the bougainvillea an ideal plant for the decoration of dry places, such as the Greek island of Santorini depicted.

== Symbolism and nomenclature ==
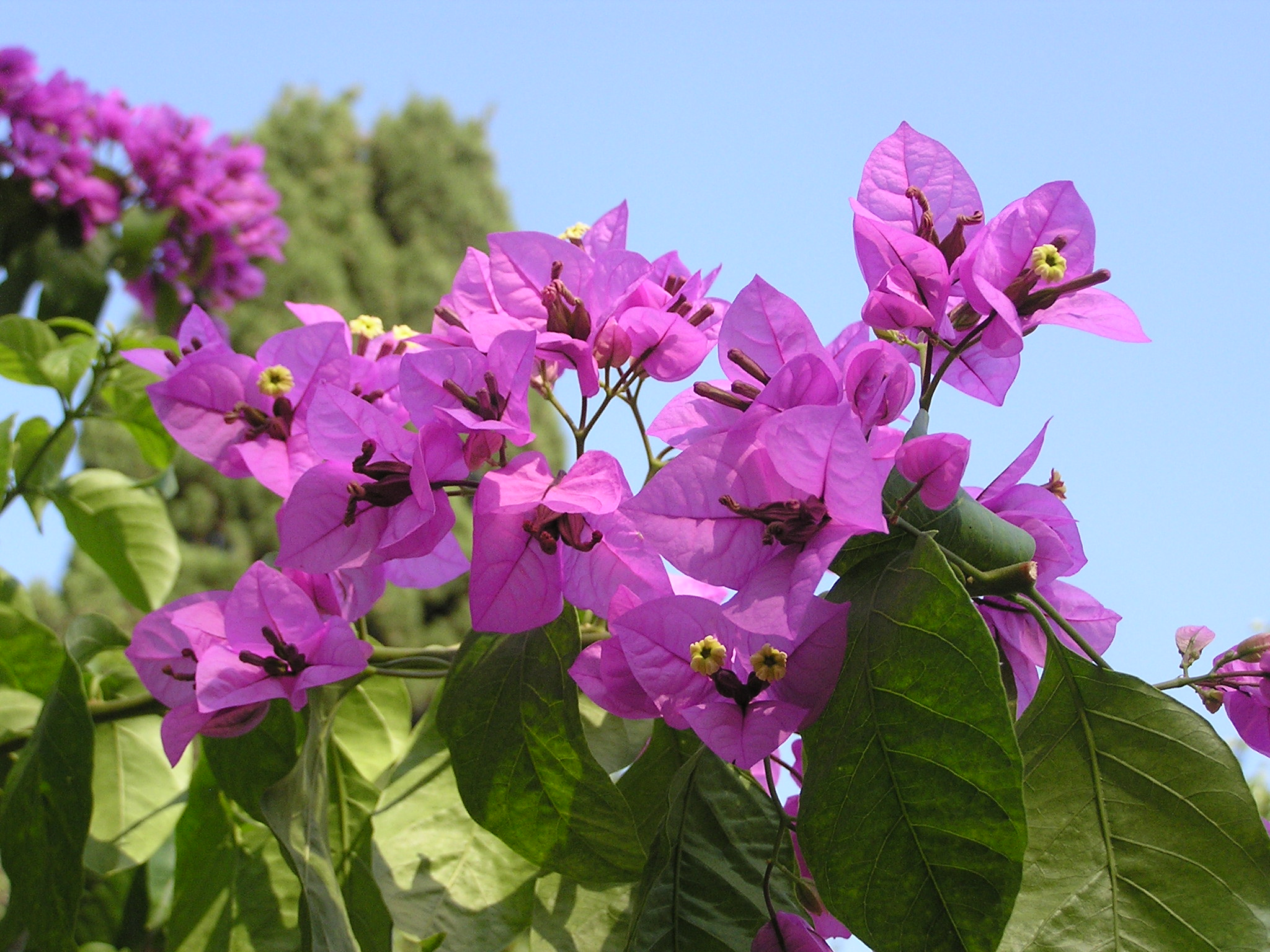
Bougainvillea in southern Crimea, Ukraine. The humid subtropical climate in the area allows the cultivation of certain cultivars.

Various species of Bougainvillea are the official flowers of Guam (where it is known as the Puti Tai Nobiu); Lienchiang and Pingtung Counties in Taiwan; Ipoh, Malaysia; the cities of Tagbilaran, Philippines; Camarillo, California; Laguna Niguel, California; San Clemente, California; the cities of Shenzhen, Huizhou, Zhuhai, and Jiangmen in Guangdong Province, China; Xiamen, Fujian and Naha, Okinawa. It is also the national flower of Grenada.

Native to South America, bougainvillea carry several names in the different regions where they are present. Apart from Rioplatense Spanish santa-rita, Colombian Spanish veranera, Peruvian Spanish papelillo, Caribbean Spanish trinitaria, it may be variously named primavera, três-marias, sempre-lustrosa, santa-rita, ceboleiro, roseiro, roseta, riso, pataguinha, pau-de-roseira and flor-de-papel in Brazilian Portuguese. Nevertheless, buganvília [buɡɐ̃ˈviʎ̟ɐ] in Portuguese and buganvilia [buɣamˈbilja] in Spanish are the most common names accepted by people of the regions where these languages are spoken but it is an introduced plant.

== Toxicity ==
The sap of bougainvillea can cause serious skin rashes, similar to Toxicodendron species.

== Taxonomy and phylogeny ==
As of 2010, Bougainvillea is generally placed in the Bougainvilleeae tribe (containing three genera) of the Nyctaginaceae family with Pisonieae being a sister tribe (containing four genera):

- - Pisonieae
    - Pisoniella (Heimerl) Standl. (2 species)
    - - - Neea Ruiz & Pav. (81)
        - Guapira Aubl. (76)
      - Pisonia L. (47)
  - Bougainvilleeae
    - Bougainvillea Comm. ex Juss. (16 species)
    - - Belemia Pires (2)
      - Phaeoptilum Radlk. (1)

=== Species ===
According to the Catalogue of Life, there are 16 species of Bougainvillea.

- Bougainvillea berberidifolia Heimerl
- Bougainvillea campanulata Heimerl
- Bougainvillea glabra Choisy
- Bougainvillea herzogiana Heimerl
- Bougainvillea infesta Griseb.
- Bougainvillea lehmanniana Heimerl
- Bougainvillea malmeana Heimerl
- Bougainvillea modesta Heimerl
- Bougainvillea pachyphylla Heimerl ex Standl.
- Bougainvillea peruviana Humb. & Bonpl.
- Bougainvillea praecox Griseb.
- Bougainvillea spectabilis Willd.
- Bougainvillea spinosa (Cav.) Heimerl
- Bougainvillea stipitata Griseb.
- Bougainvillea trollii Heimerl
- Bougainvillea × buttiana Holttum & Standl. (B. glabra × B. peruviana)

== See also ==
- Wisteria
