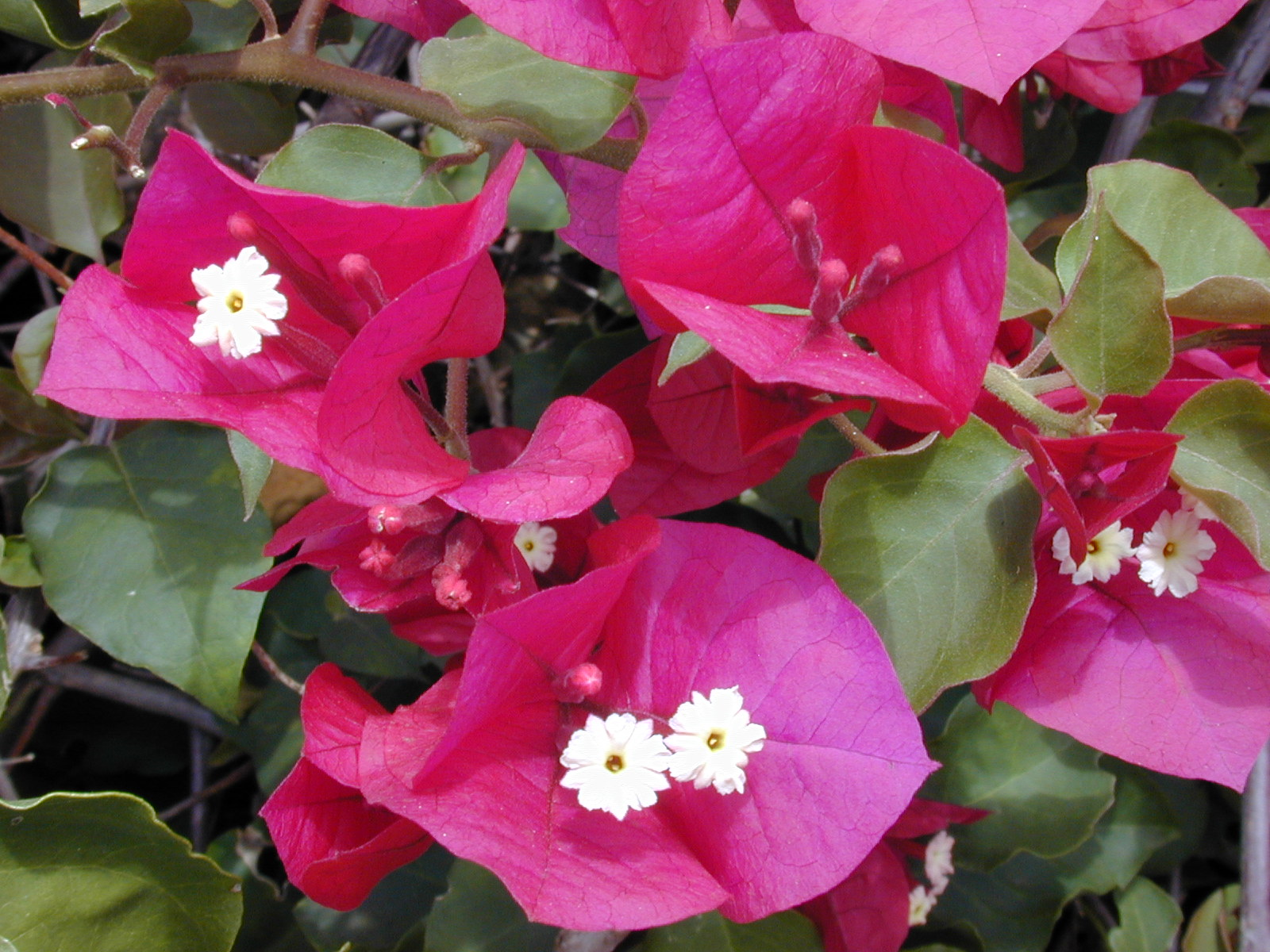

Scientific classification
- Kingdom: Plantae
- Clade: Tracheophytes
- Clade: Angiosperms
- Clade: Eudicots
- Order: Caryophyllales
- Family: Nyctaginaceae
- Genus: Bougainvillea
- Species: B. spectabilis

Binomial name
- Bougainvillea spectabilis Willd.

= Bougainvillea spectabilis =

Species of flowering plant

Bougainvillea spectabilis, also known as great bougainvillea, is a species of flowering plant. It is native to Brazil, Bolivia, Peru, and Argentina's Chubut Province. It is widely grown as an ornamental plant.

== Description ==
Bougainvillea spectabilis grows as a woody vine or shrub, reaching 15 to 40 feet (4.6 to 12.2 m) with heart-shaped leaves and thorny, pubescent stems. The flowers are generally small, white, and inconspicuous, highlighted by several brightly colored modified leaves called bracts. The bracts can vary in color, ranging from white, red, mauve, purple-red, or orange. Its fruit is a small, inconspicuous, dry, elongated achene.

== Distribution ==
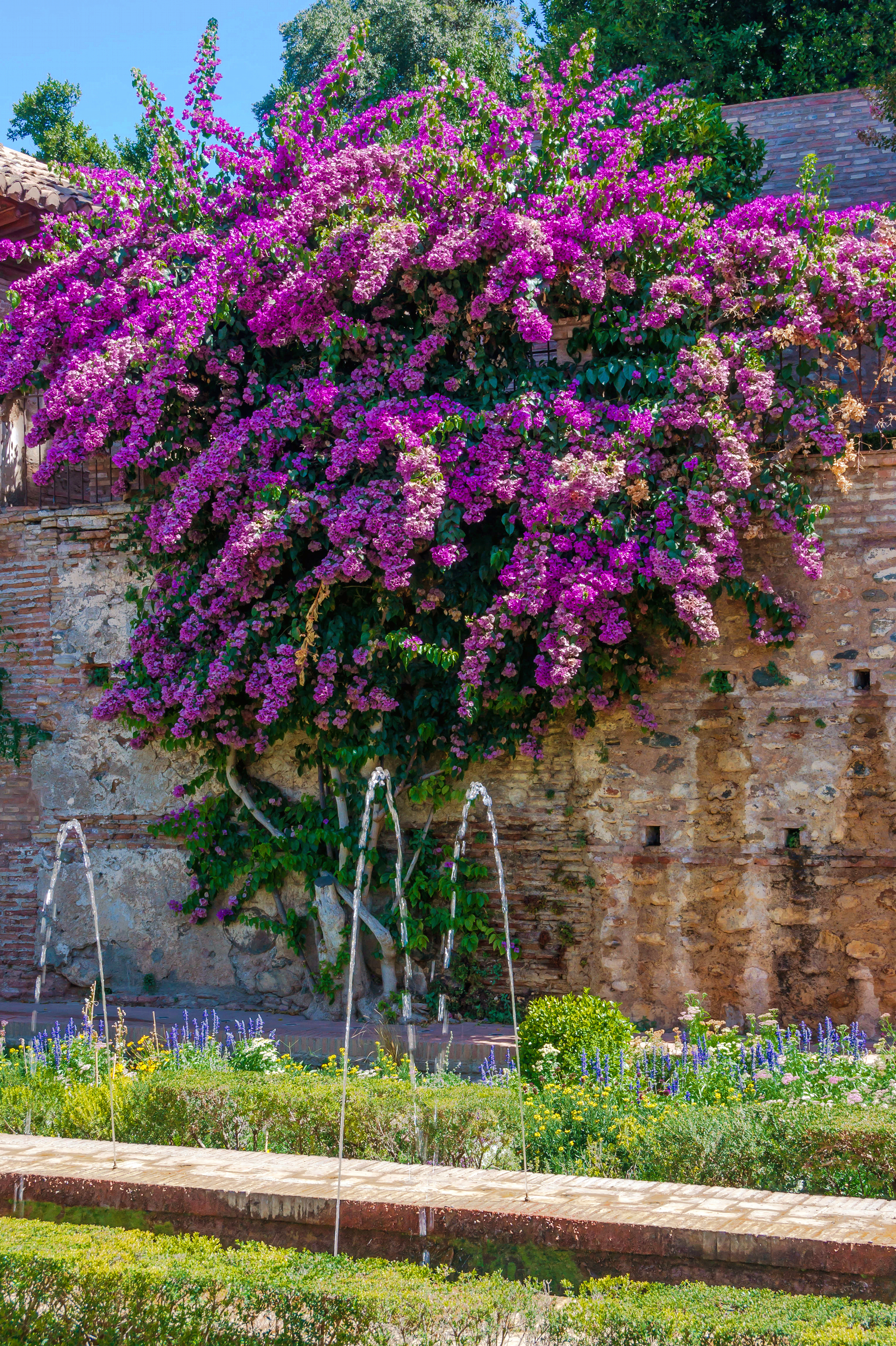
Bougainvillea spectabilis

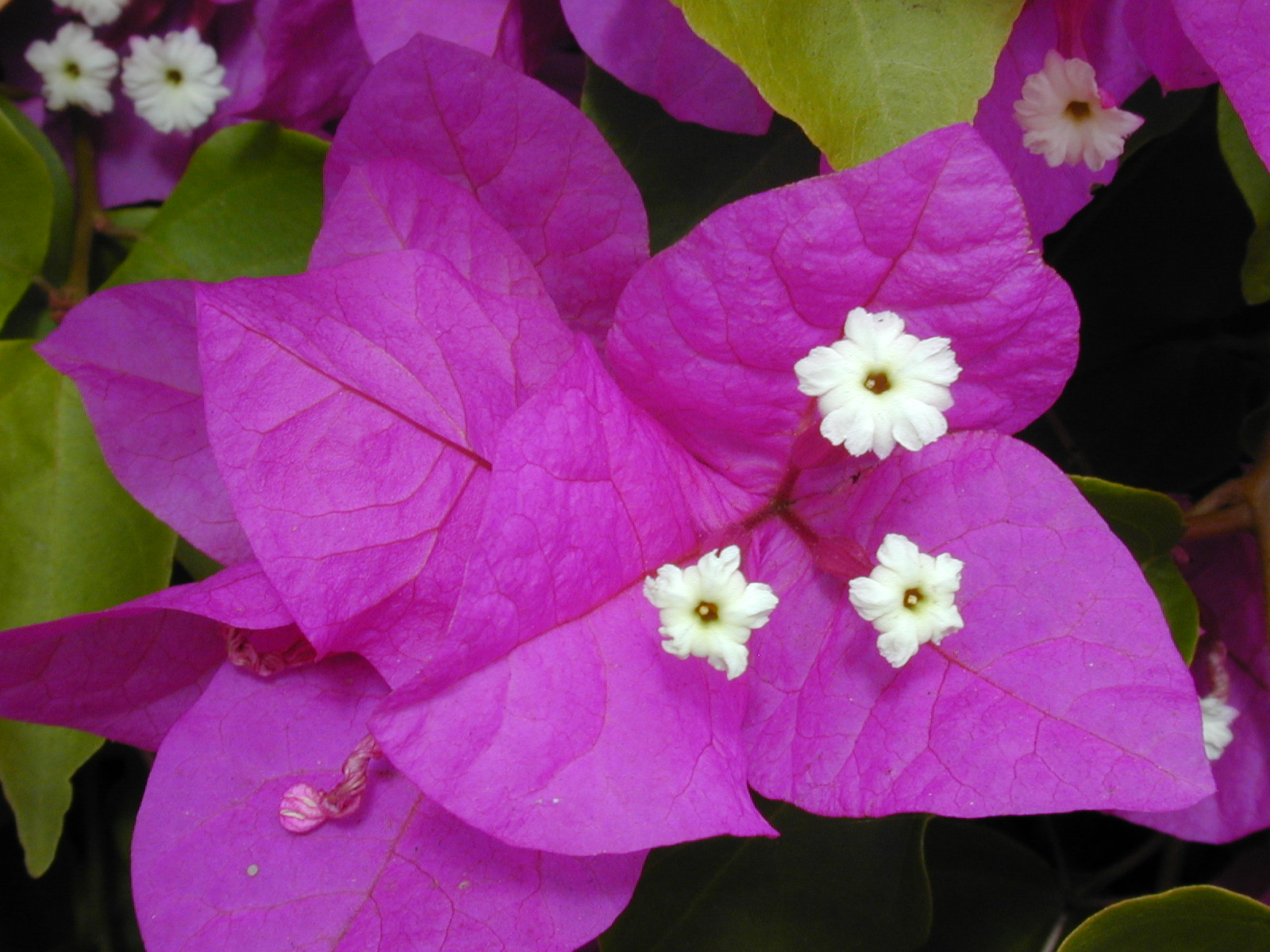
Detail of flowers and bracts

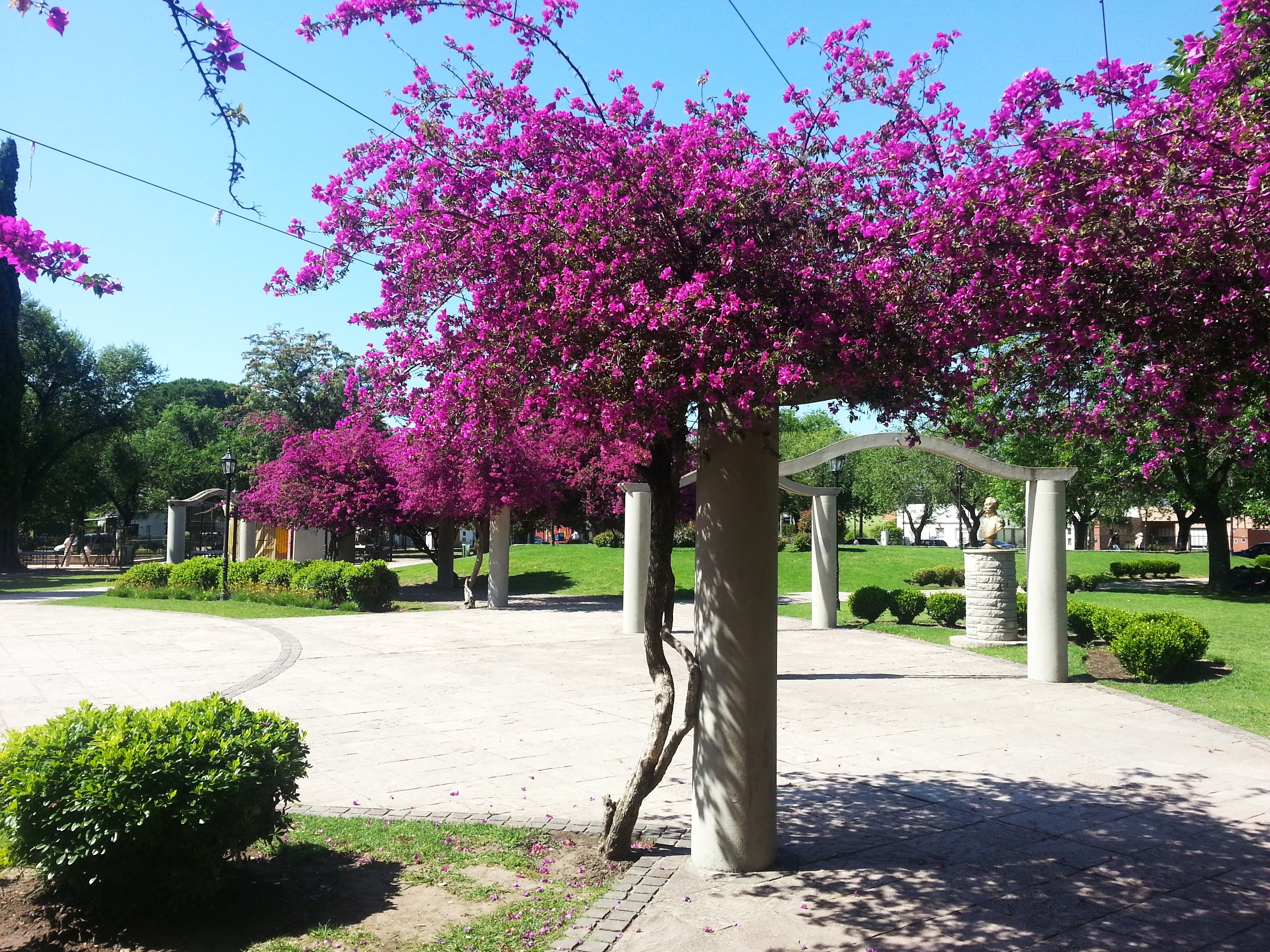
In the province of Buenos Aires

Bougainvillea spectabilis is native to Brazil, Peru, Bolivia, and Chubut Province, Argentina, but it has been introduced in many other areas.

== Cultivation ==
Bougainvillea spectabilis can grow in hardiness zones 10–11, preferring full sun, dry conditions, and fertile soil. It can be propagated from stem and root cuttings.

== Traditional medicine ==
The Yanadi tribe of Chittoor district, Andhra Pradesh, India, once used the leaves of Bougainvillea spectabilis to heal diabetes.

== See also ==
- Glendora Bougainvillea
