= A. floribunda =

A. floribunda may refer to:

- Abarema floribunda, a large tree
- Abelia floribunda, an evergreen shrub
- Acacia floribunda, an Oceanian plant
- Acriopsis floribunda, a flowering plant
- Adenaria floribunda, a New World plant
- Aechmea floribunda, a plant endemic to Brazil
- Akrosida floribunda, a tree native to the Dominican Republic
- Alchornea floribunda, an African plant
- Alchorneopsis floribunda, a New World plant
- Allanblackia floribunda, an African plant
- Alseis floribunda, a New World plant
- Alyxia floribunda, a flowering plant
- Anaxagorea floribunda, a custard apple
- Andradea floribunda, a four o'clock
- Angophora floribunda, a large tree
- Aronia floribunda, a deciduous shrub
