= Neea amplexicaulis =

Conservation status
- Endangered (IUCN 2.3)

Scientific classification
- Kingdom: Plantae
- Clade: Tracheophytes
- Clade: Angiosperms
- Clade: Eudicots
- Order: Caryophyllales
- Family: Nyctaginaceae
- Genus: Neea
- Species: N. amplexicaulis

Binomial name
- Neea amplexicaulis Dwyer & Hayden

Species of flowering plant

Neea amplexicaulis is a species of plant in the Nyctaginaceae family. It is endemic to Panama. It is threatened by habitat loss.
