= Acleisanthes crassifolia =

Scientific classification
- Kingdom: Plantae
- Clade: Tracheophytes
- Clade: Angiosperms
- Clade: Eudicots
- Order: Caryophyllales
- Family: Nyctaginaceae
- Genus: Acleisanthes
- Species: A. crassifolia

Binomial name
- Acleisanthes crassifolia A. Gray

Species of flowering plant

Acleisanthes crassifolia, the Texas trumpets, is a plant in the family Nyctaginaceae. It is found in North America and Mexico and is native to southwestern counties of Texas and northeastern Mexico. These plants grow low to the ground with the stem of these fully grown plants between 15 cm to 20 cm long. There are few other species of Acleisanthes that inhabit the same areas. However, Texas trumpets can be easily identified throughout the year based on their thick and dark green leaves which has white veins. Acleisanthes crassifolia is a perennial herbaceous plant with fruits and flowers.

== Distribution ==
Acleisanthes crassifolia naturally occurs in Southwestern Texas counties and in Mexico. They can be found in Maverick, Val Verde, and Kinney counties, and in Coahuila, Mexico.

== Habitat and ecology ==
Acleisanthes crassifolia is a perennial plant that grows in well-drained, gravelly loams of areas with changing elevations/slopes, usually found in scattered vegetated regions of shrub lands. This plant is adapted to semiarid weather conditions. Its environmental precipitation range is from 330mm to 610mm/yr, and temperature range from 10 to 43 degree Celsius.

== Morphology ==
Individuals of this species are subshrubs that have horizontal shoots low to the ground. These plants grow low to the ground with 15–50 cm long prostrate and procumbent stems. It has opposite leaves in pairs which are not equal in size. The blades are 1/3 to 2/3 bigger than the petioles. The plant's petioles are thick and ovate shaped with rough surface, 5–45 mm long and 2–30 mm wide, sharp to dull but particularly sharp at the apex and triangular to round shaped at the base. Leaves are elliptical shaped, thick and dark green with white pinnate and undulate white veins. Flowers are axillary, separate from each other (not on the same stem), and attached directly to the base of stem.

== Flowers and fruit ==
Flowers of Acleisanthes crassifolia are chasmogamous or cleistogamous. Petals of corolla in Cleistogamous flowers are green and 2–6 mm long. The petals of corolla of chasmogamous flowers are white, projected outward and shaped like a funnel, 5-lobed petals that are 8-25mm wide. The fruits are 5-angled, elongated and oval shaped, 6–9 mm long and 3–4 mm wide, minutely narrow at both ends, has light longitudinally concaved lines along with 5 wide low ribs without resinous glands, fruit body surface has small white hairs that are pressed towards the body.
