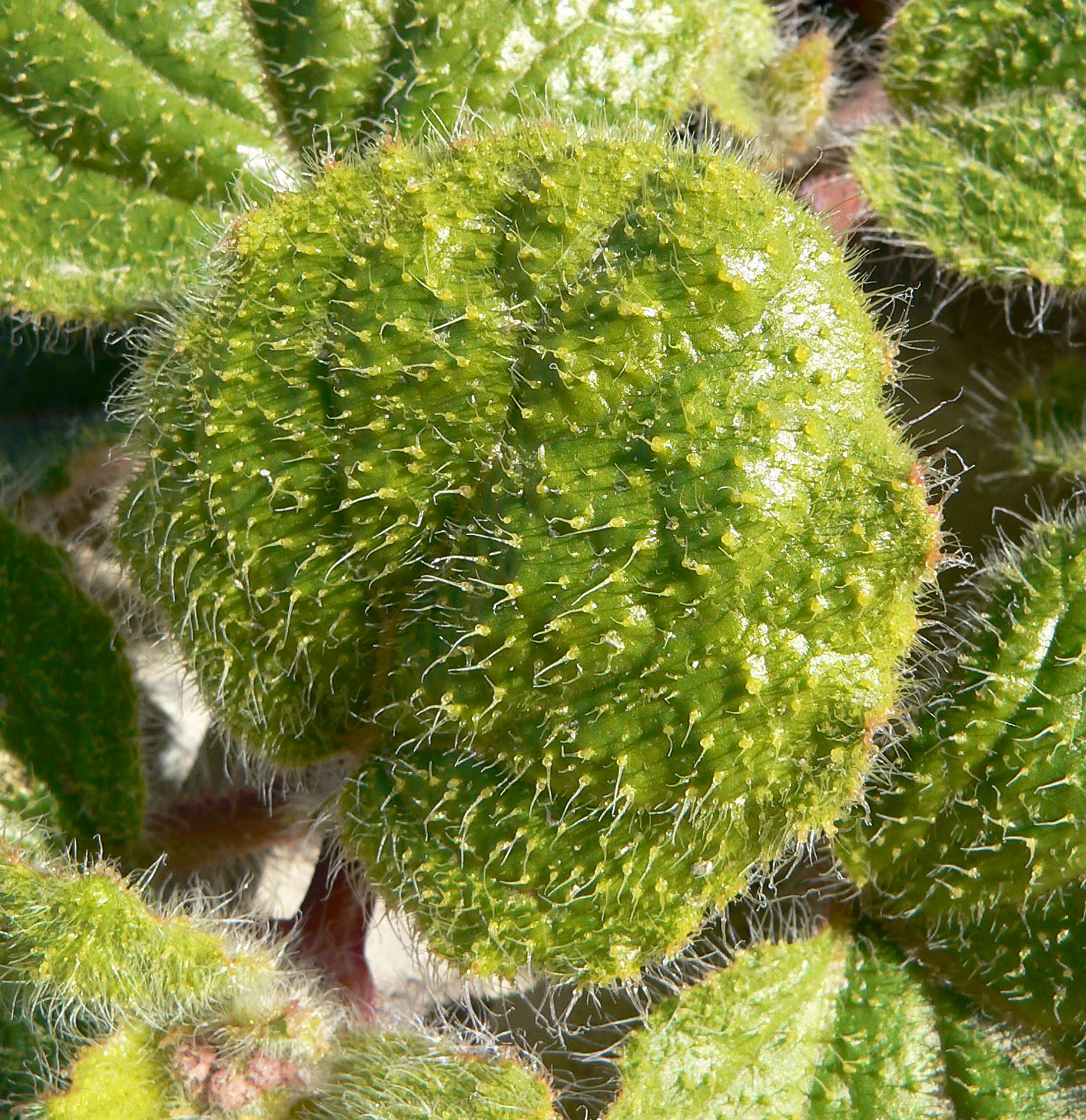
- leaf

Conservation status
- Vulnerable (NatureServe)

Scientific classification
- Kingdom: Plantae
- Clade: Tracheophytes
- Clade: Angiosperms
- Clade: Eudicots
- Order: Caryophyllales
- Family: Nyctaginaceae
- Genus: Anulocaulis
- Species: A. annulatus

Binomial name
- Anulocaulis annulatus (Coville) Standl.

Synonyms
- Boerhavia annulata

= Anulocaulis annulatus =

Species of flowering plant

Anulocaulis annulatus is a species of flowering plant in the four o'clock family known by the common name valley ringstem. It is endemic to the Mojave Desert of California, especially in the vicinity of Death Valley. This is a perennial herb growing a number of thin, erect stems sometimes exceeding a meter in height from a thick caudex.

The smooth stems have darkened internodes at intervals which are glandular and sticky. The leaves are mostly located at the base of the plant. Each has a short petiole and a thick, bumpy blade up to 10 centimetres (3.9 in) wide. The leaf is coated in large, stiff hairs with glandular bases. The branching inflorescence bears clusters of very hairy, tubular flowers. Each flower is just under a centimetre long with a greenish throat and a striped pink face. The fruit is a small, hard body about half a centimetre long.

== See also ==
- Anulocaulis
- Nyctaginaceae
