= Neea acuminatissima =

Conservation status
- Endangered (IUCN 2.3)

Scientific classification
- Kingdom: Plantae
- Clade: Tracheophytes
- Clade: Angiosperms
- Clade: Eudicots
- Order: Caryophyllales
- Family: Nyctaginaceae
- Genus: Neea
- Species: N. acuminatissima

Binomial name
- Neea acuminatissima Standl.

Species of flowering plant

Neea acuminatissima is a species of plant in the Nyctaginaceae family. It is found in Guatemala and Honduras.
