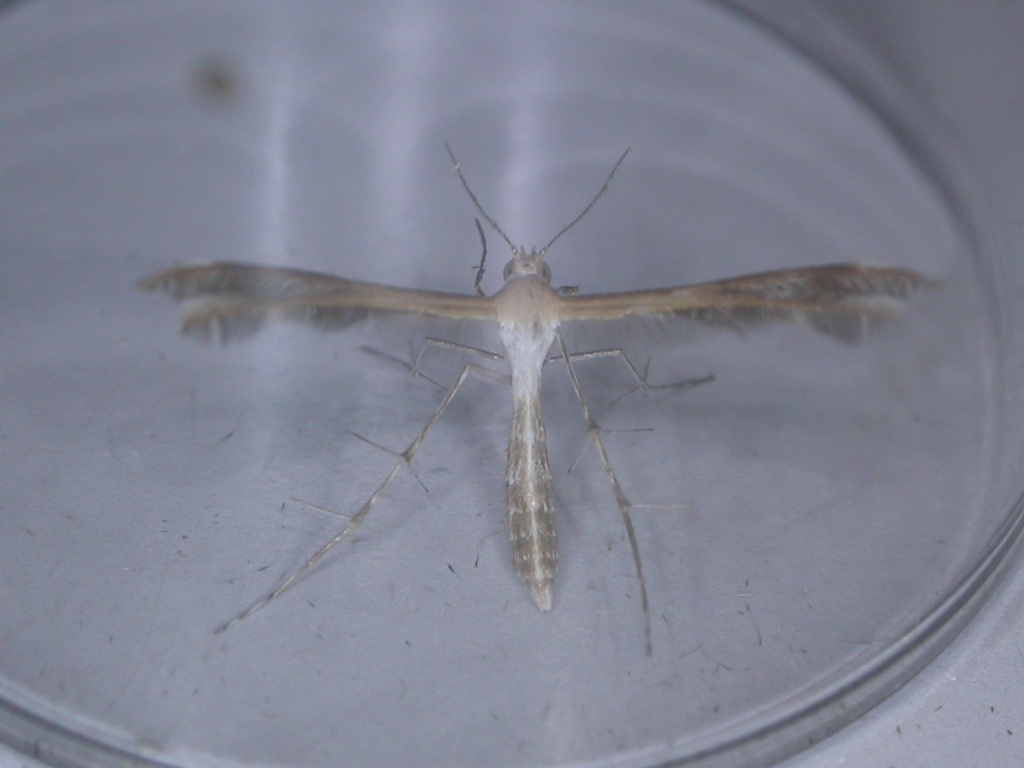
- Megalorhipida leucodactyla

Scientific classification
- Kingdom: Animalia
- Phylum: Arthropoda
- Class: Insecta
- Order: Lepidoptera
- Family: Pterophoridae
- Tribe: Oxyptilini
- Genus: Megalorhipida; Amsel, 1935

Synonyms
- Megalorrhipida Amsel, 1935

= Megalorhipida =

Plume moth genus

Megalorhipida is a genus of moths in the family Pterophoridae described by Hans Georg Amsel in 1935. Species in this genus are distributed in pantropical and subtropical climates. The species typically nests on host plants in the families Nyctaginaceae, Amaranthaceae, Fabaceae, Goodeniaceae, Asteraceae, and Verbenaceae. The generic name is often misspelled as Megalorrhipida. The species placed in the genus Antarches have previously been considered to belong to this genus.

== Species ==
- Megalorhipida angusta Arenberger, 2002
- Megalorhipida deboeri Gielis, 2003
- Megalorhipida dubiosa Gielis, 2006
- Megalorhipida dulcis (Walsingham, 1915)
- Megalorhipida fissa Arenberger, 2002
- Megalorhipida gielisi Rose and Pooni, 2003
- Megalorhipida leptomeres (Meyrick, 1886)
- Megalorhipida leucodactyla (Fabricius, 1793)
- Megalorhipida madoris Gielis & de Vos, 2007
- Megalorhipida monsa Bippus, 2020
- Megalorhipida palaestinensis (Fabricius, 1793) (type)
- Megalorhipida paradefectalis Rose and Pooni, 2003
- Megalorhipida paraiso Gielis, 2006
- Megalorhipida parvula Arenberger, 2010
- Megalorhipida prolai (Gibeaux, 1994)
- Megalorhipida pseudodefectalis (Gielis, 1989)
- Megalorhipida tessmanni (Strand, 1912)
- Megalorhipida vivax (Meyrick, 1909)

== Etymology ==
The spelling of the genus name differs in some literature. A study by Gielis, 2006 re-evaluated later some specimens and placed several species into Megalorhipida, and consistently uses that same spelling of the genus. That contains is a direct statement as a subheader that "Megalorrhipida Amsel, 1935a: 293.— Incorrect (of a multiple original) spelling" to indicate that this alternative spelling is deemed incorrect (on p. 201 of Gielis, 2006). That same work notably also includes examination of a taxon named as Megalorhipida pseudodefectalis Gielis, 1989 (on p. 203-204 of Gielis, 2006) where a sub-header reads "Megalorrhipida pseudodefectalis Gielis, 1989a: 107", presumably to indicated that alternative spelling as unfavored, citing an older study using that spelling. Yet, the author's preferred spelling of the genus is perhaps clarified in another publication of the same year which by inference from the title along seems instead to favor Megalorhipida. The difference in spelling can be due to differing historical usage within the original publication of Amsel, 1935, who appears to have inconsistently using different spellings. Per ICZN, "32.2.1. If a name is spelled in more than one way in the work in which it was established, then, except as provided otherwise in this Article, the correct original spelling is that chosen by the First Reviser Art. 24.2.3.". This may be in the latter paper by Gielis, 1989, as reflected later, e.g. in Gielis, 2006
