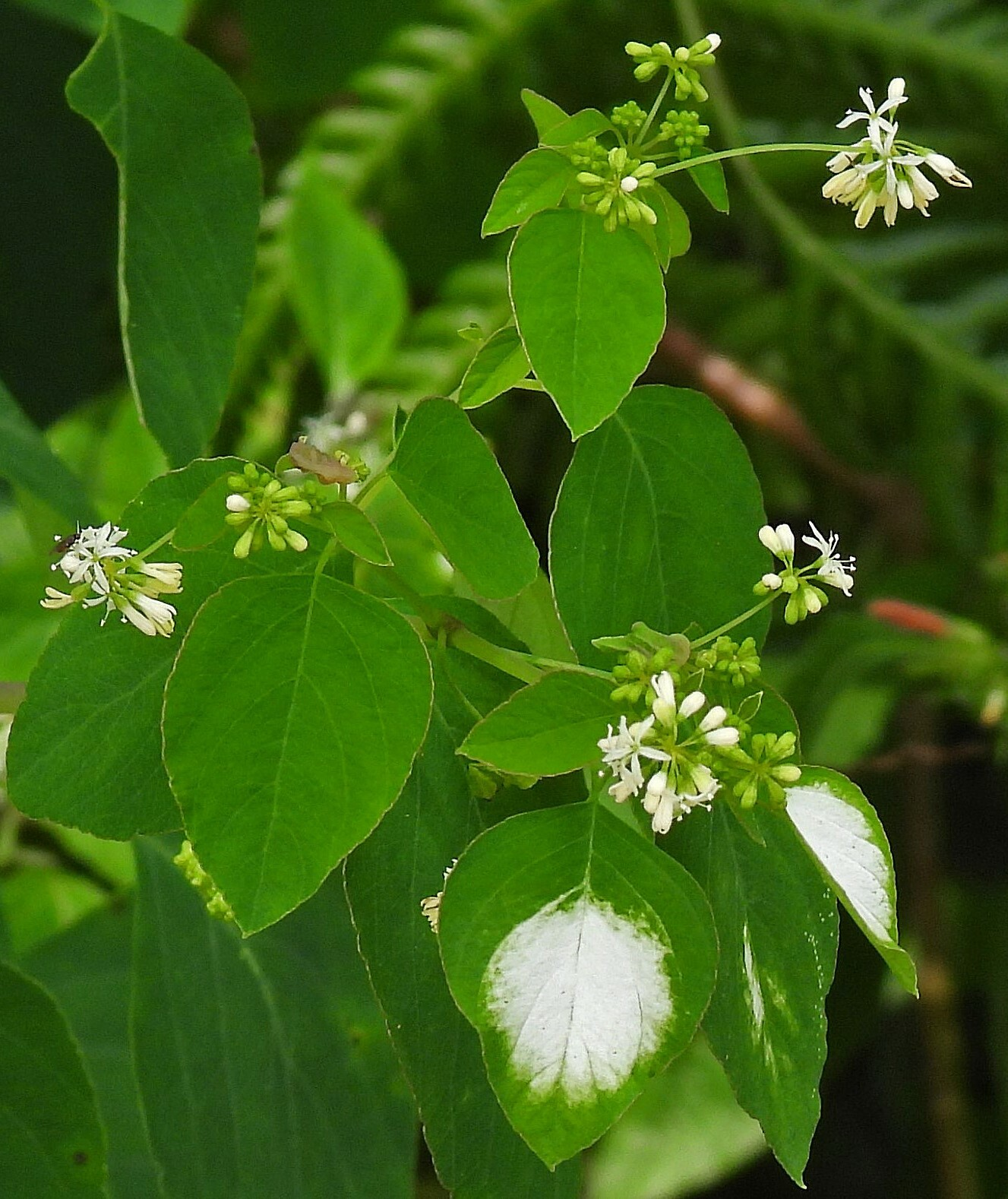
- In Argentina

Scientific classification
- Kingdom: Plantae
- Clade: Embryophytes
- Clade: Tracheophytes
- Clade: Spermatophytes
- Clade: Angiosperms
- Clade: Eudicots
- Order: Caryophyllales
- Family: Nyctaginaceae
- Genus: Colignonia
- Species: C. glomerata

Binomial name
- Colignonia glomerata Griseb.

= Colignonia glomerata =

Species of flowering plant

Colignonia glomerata is a species of flowering plant belonging to the family Nyctaginaceae. It is found in Peru, Bolivia, Paraguay, and parts of Argentina. It grows primarily in a temperate biome.
