= Guapira myrtiflora =

Conservation status
- Least Concern (IUCN 2.3)

Scientific classification
- Kingdom: Plantae
- Clade: Tracheophytes
- Clade: Angiosperms
- Clade: Eudicots
- Order: Caryophyllales
- Family: Nyctaginaceae
- Genus: Guapira
- Species: G. myrtiflora

Binomial name
- Guapira myrtiflora (Standl.) Little

Species of flowering plant

Guapira myrtiflora is a species of plant in the Nyctaginaceae family. It is found in Colombia, Panama, and Peru.
