= Neea buxifolia =

Scientific classification
- Kingdom: Plantae
- Clade: Tracheophytes
- Clade: Angiosperms
- Clade: Eudicots
- Order: Caryophyllales
- Family: Nyctaginaceae
- Genus: Neea
- Species: N. buxifolia

Binomial name
- Neea buxifolia (Hook.f.) Heimerl

Synonyms
- Eggersia buxifolia Hook.f.

Species of flowering plant

Neea buxifolia, the tropical boxwood, is a species of flowering plant in the saltwood genus Neea (family Nyctaginaceae), native to Puerto Rico and the Virgin Islands. It is used in bonsai.
