= Guapira rotundifolia =

Conservation status
- Near Threatened (IUCN 2.3)

Scientific classification
- Kingdom: Plantae
- Clade: Tracheophytes
- Clade: Angiosperms
- Clade: Eudicots
- Order: Caryophyllales
- Family: Nyctaginaceae
- Genus: Guapira
- Species: G. rotundifolia

Binomial name
- Guapira rotundifolia (Heimerl) Lundell

Species of flowering plant

Guapira rotundifolia is a species of plant in the Nyctaginaceae family. It is endemic to Jamaica.
