= Acleisanthes parvifolia =

Big Bend trumpets

Scientific classification
- Kingdom: Plantae
- Clade: Tracheophytes
- Clade: Angiosperms
- Clade: Eudicots
- Order: Caryophyllales
- Family: Nyctaginaceae
- Genus: Acleisanthes
- Species: A. parvifolia

Binomial name
- Acleisanthes parvifolia (Torr.) R.A.Levin

Synonyms
- Selinocarpus diffusus var. parvifolius Torr.; Selinocarpus parvifolius (Torr.) Standl.

Species of flowering plant

Acleisanthes parvifolia, common names littleleaf moonpod and Big Bend trumpets, is a plant species native to northeastern Chihuahua, Mexico, and western Texas, United States. In Texas, is known from only 4 counties: Culberson, Hudspeth, Brewster and Presidio. Some of the populations are situated inside Big Bend National Park, others within Guadalupe Mountains National Park.

Acleisanthes parvifolia is a perennial herb up to 60 cm tall, sometimes a bit woody at the base. Leaves are yellow-green, up to 25 mm long. Flowers are usually solitary, yellow-green, up to 6 cm long. Fruits are up to 10 mm long, hairy.
