= Neea ekmanii =

Conservation status
- Endangered (IUCN 2.3)

Scientific classification
- Kingdom: Plantae
- Clade: Tracheophytes
- Clade: Angiosperms
- Clade: Eudicots
- Order: Caryophyllales
- Family: Nyctaginaceae
- Genus: Neea
- Species: N. ekmanii

Binomial name
- Neea ekmanii Heimerl

Species of flowering plant

Neea ekmanii is a species of plant in the Nyctaginaceae family. It is endemic to Cuba. It is threatened by habitat loss.
