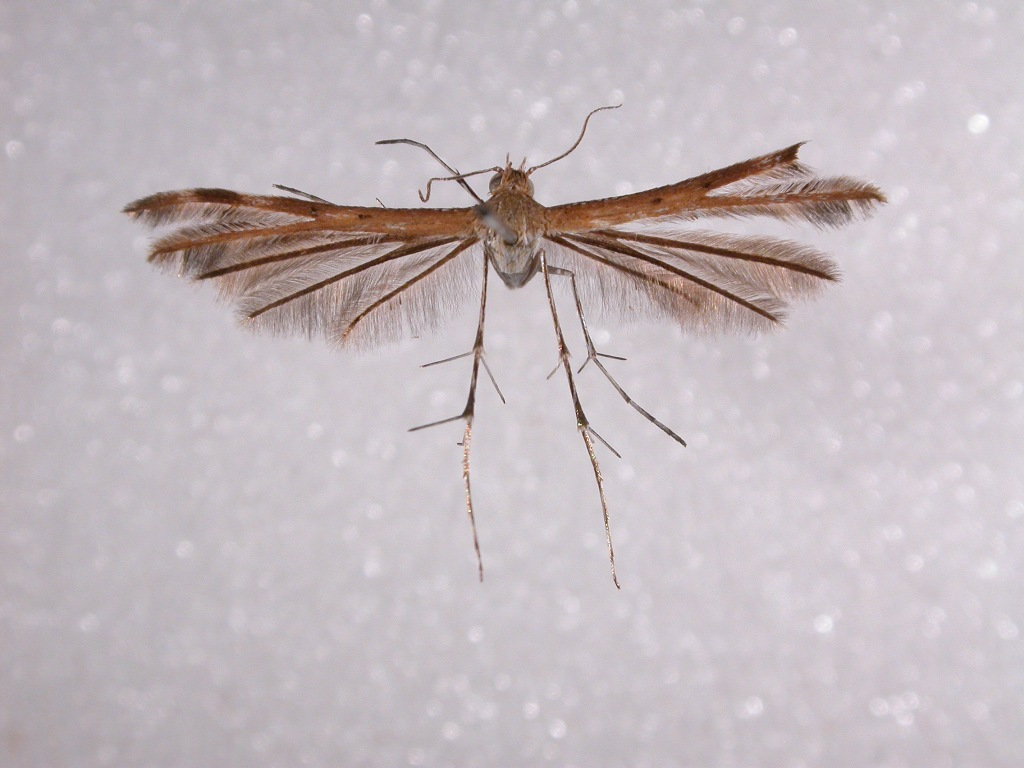

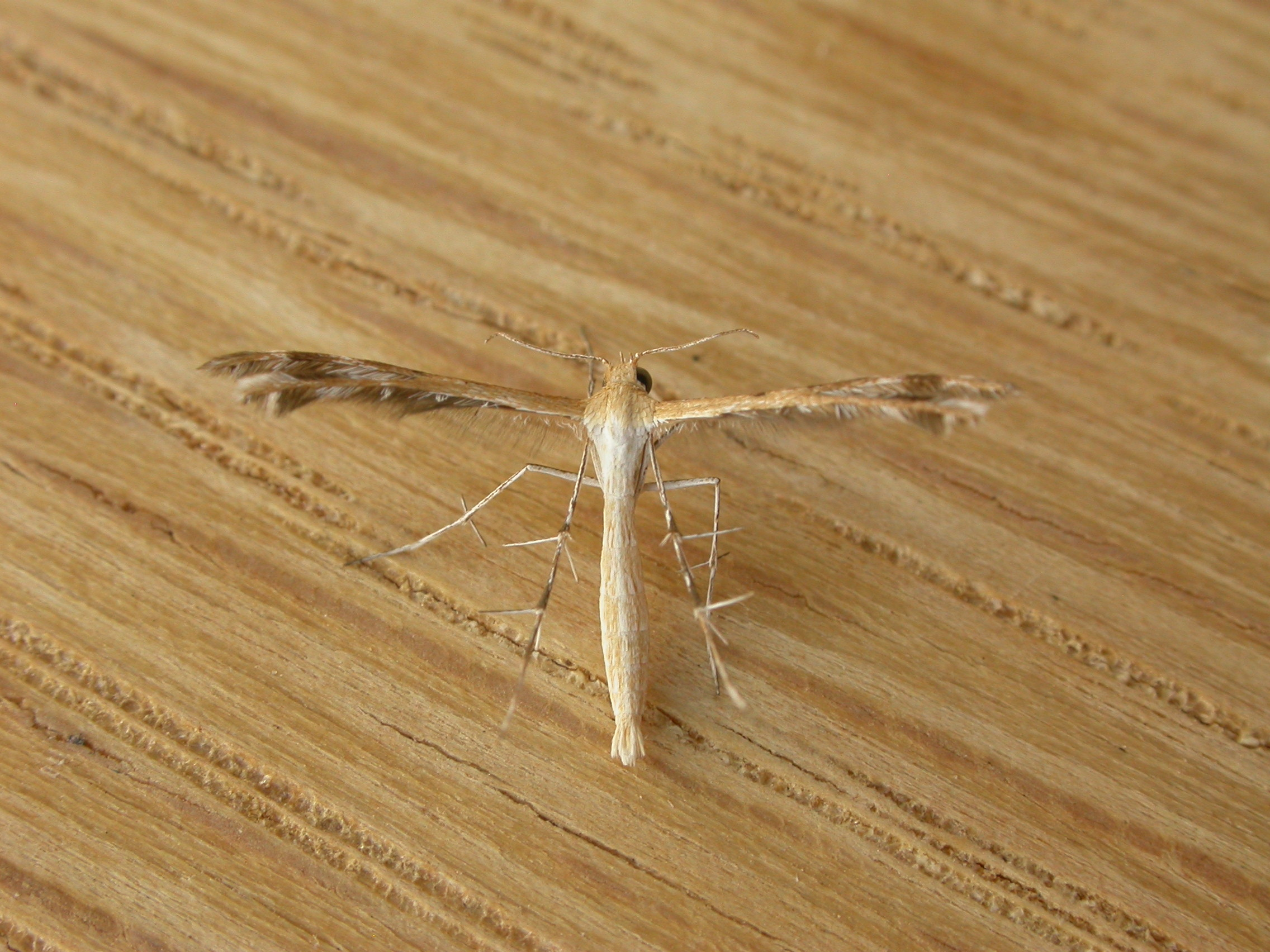

Scientific classification
- Kingdom: Animalia
- Phylum: Arthropoda
- Class: Insecta
- Order: Lepidoptera
- Family: Pterophoridae
- Genus: Megalorhipida
- Species: M. leucodactyla

Binomial name
- Megalorhipida leucodactyla (Fabricius, 1793)

Synonyms
- Megalorrhipida leucodactylus; Megalorhipida leucodactylus; Pterophorus leucodactylus Fabricius, 1793; Pterophorus defectalis Walker, 1864; Megalorhipida defectalis (Walker, 1864); Pterophorus congrualis Walker, 1864; Pterophorus oxydactyla Walker, 1864; Aciptilia hawaiiensis Butler, 1881; Trichoptilus ochrodactyla Fish, 1881; Trichoptilus centetes Meyrick, 1886; Trichoptilus compsochares Meyrick, 1886; Trichoptilus adelphodes Meyrick, 1887; Trichoptilus ralumensis Pagenstecher, 1900; Trichoptilus derelictus Meyrick, 1926; Megalorrhipida palaestinensis Amsel, 1935; Megalorrhipida palästinensis Amsel, 1935

= Megalorhipida leucodactyla =

Species of plume moth

Megalorhipida leucodactyla is a species of moth of the family Pterophoridae that has a pantropical distribution.

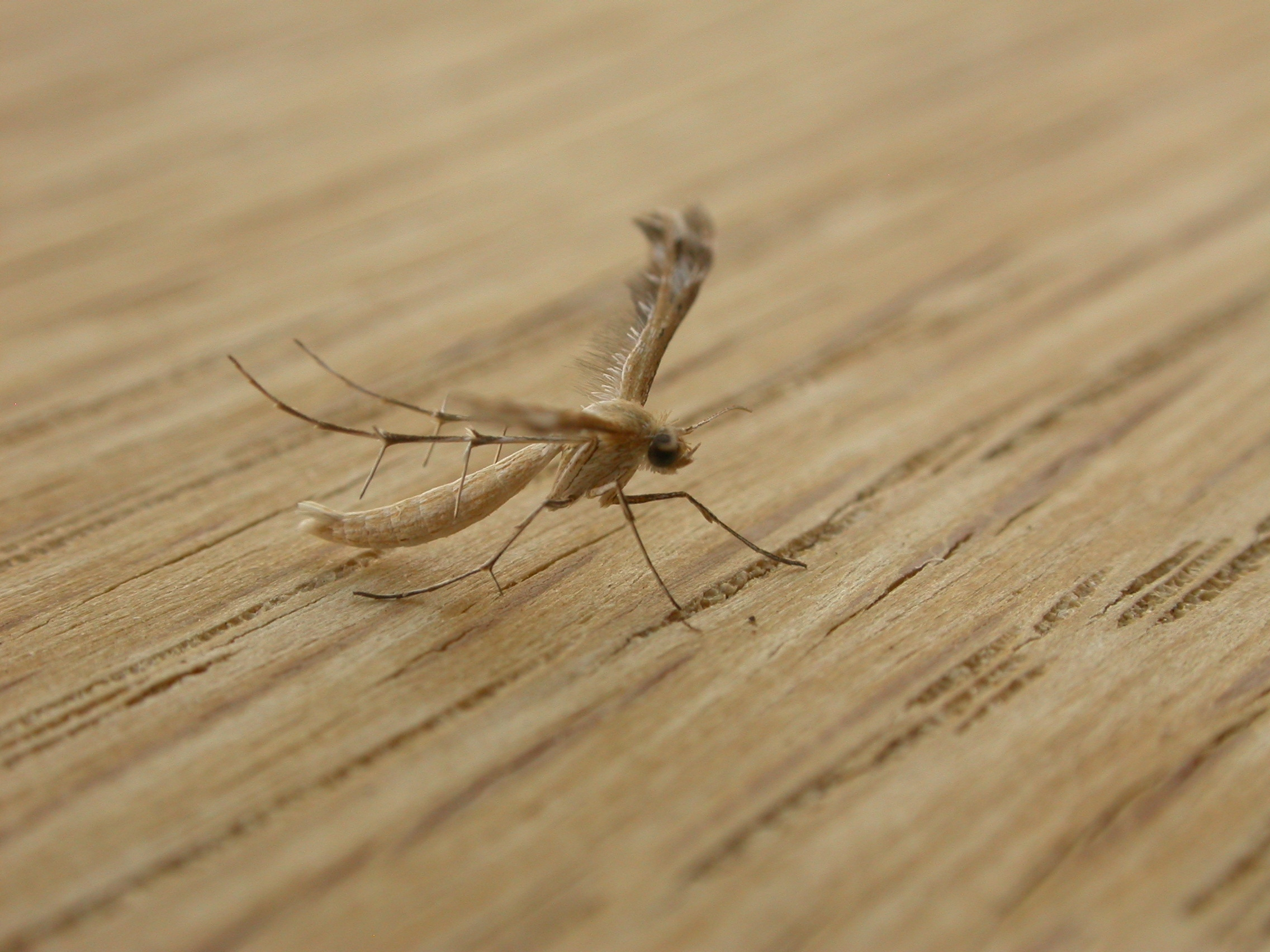

The larvae have been recorded on a wide range of plants, including Boerhavia diffusa, Okenia hypogaea, Acacia neovernicosa, Amaranthus, Mimosa tenuiflora and Commicarpus tuberosus.
