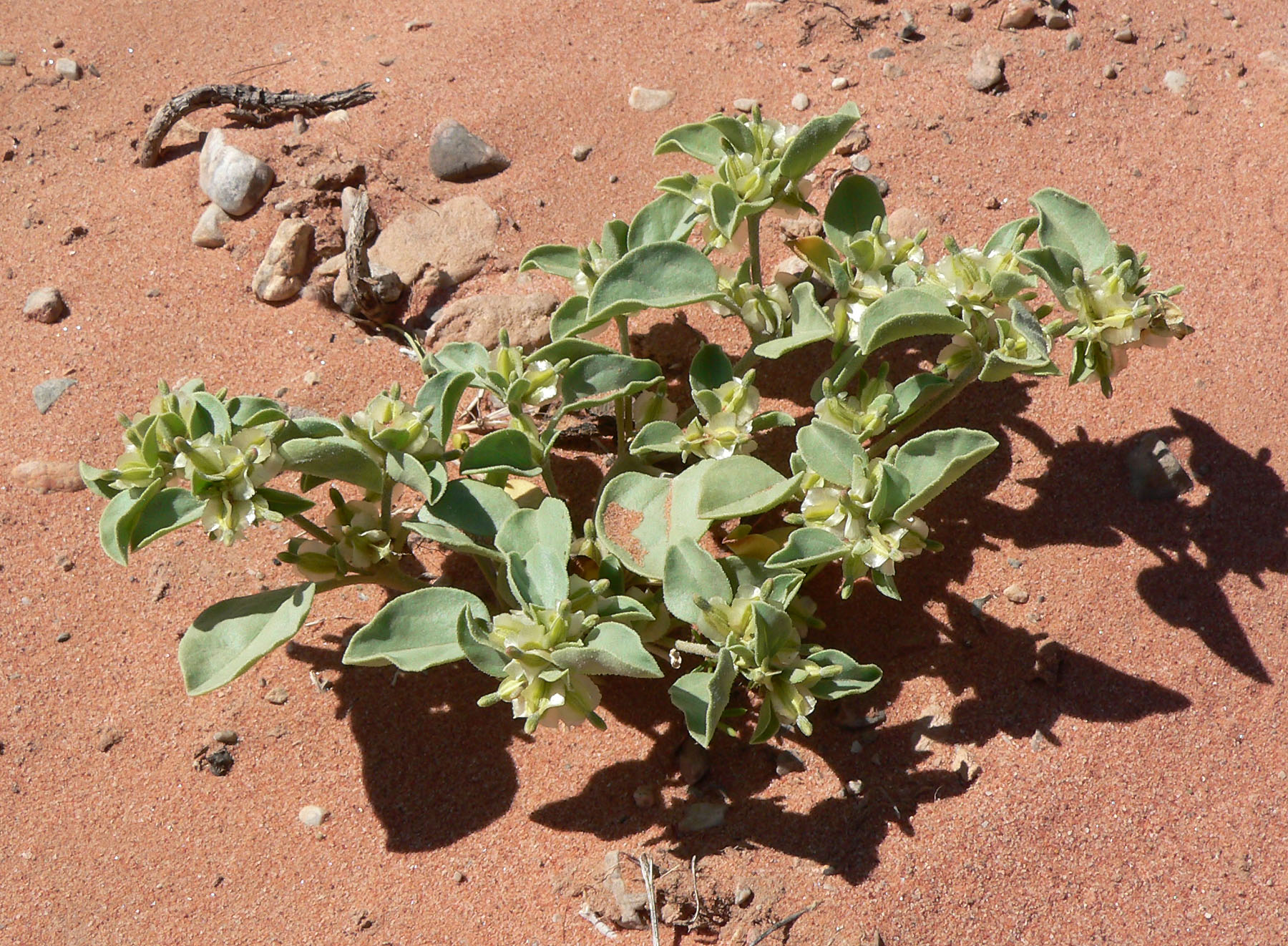

Scientific classification
- Kingdom: Plantae
- Clade: Tracheophytes
- Clade: Angiosperms
- Clade: Eudicots
- Order: Caryophyllales
- Family: Nyctaginaceae
- Genus: Acleisanthes
- Species: A. nevadensis

Binomial name
- Acleisanthes nevadensis (Standley) B.L.Turner

Synonyms
- Selinocarpus nevadensis

= Acleisanthes nevadensis =

Species of flowering plant

Acleisanthes nevadensis (syn. Selinocarpus nevadensis) is a species of flowering plant in the four o'clock family known by the common names desert moonpod and desert wing-fruit. It is native to a section of the southwestern United States encompassing southern Nevada and adjacent corners of Utah and Arizona. One occurrence has been observed in eastern California. The plant grows in desert habitat such as scrub and rocky washes. This herb produces several spreading stems up to about 30 centimeters in maximum length, sometimes from a woody base. The stems are covered in many leaves with fleshy oval or rounded blades up to 3 centimeters long which are borne on petioles. The herbage of the plant is coated in thick, wide, white, furry hairs, interspersed with shorter, flat hairs. Some hairs are glandular. Flowers occur in leaf axils. Each is a trumpet-shaped bloom with a narrow, tubular green throat up to 4 centimeters long and a round white corolla face about a centimeter wide, sometimes tinged yellow or greenish. There are five long, protruding stamens and a long style tipped with a spherical stigma. The fruit is a ribbed, hairy body with five broad, white wings.
