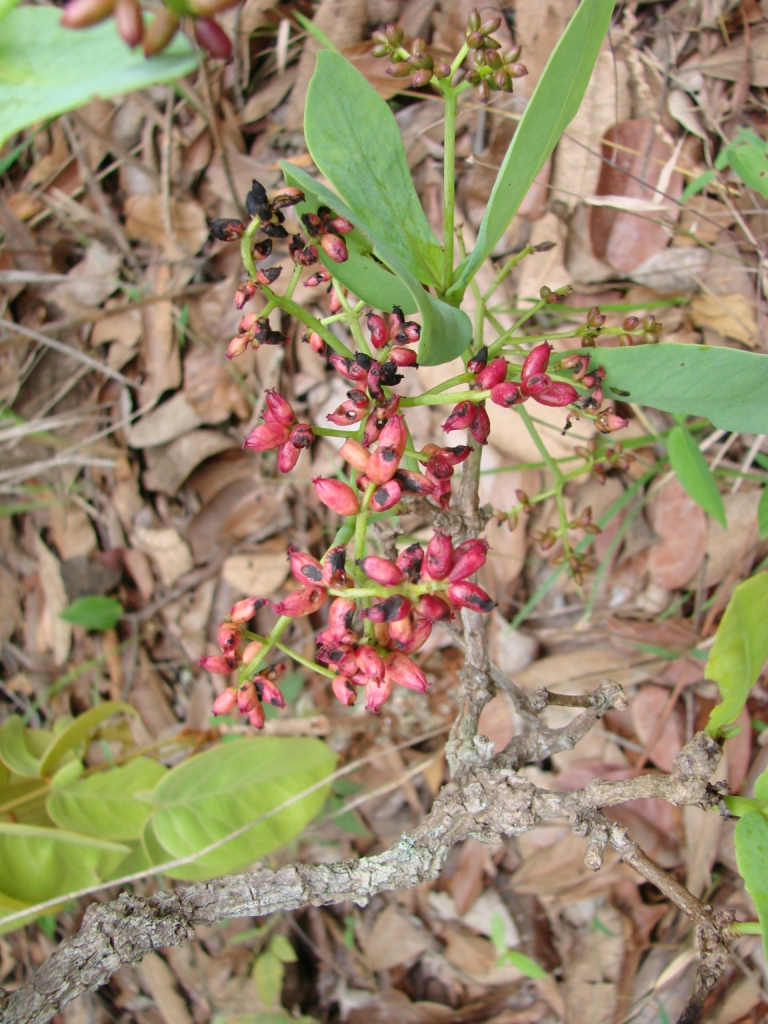
- Neea theifera

Scientific classification
- Kingdom: Plantae
- Clade: Tracheophytes
- Clade: Angiosperms
- Clade: Eudicots
- Order: Caryophyllales
- Family: Nyctaginaceae
- Tribe: Pisonieae
- Genus: Neea; Ruiz & Pav.

Synonyms
- Eggersia Hook.f.; Mitscherlichia Kunth; Nebra Noronha ex Choisy

= Neea =

Genus of flowering plants

Neea is a genus of plants in family Nyctaginaceae from the Caribbean region, Central and South America. Members of the genus are commonly called Nia, Neea, or saltwood.

The genus was named by botanists José Pavón and Hipólito Ruiz in honor of Luis Née, a botanist on the Malaspina Expedition. It was first described and published in Fl. Peruv. Prodr. on page 52 in 1794.

It is native to Belize, Bolivia, Brazil, Colombia, Costa Rica, Cuba, Dominican Republic, Ecuador, El Salvador, French Guiana, Guatemala, Guyana, Haiti, Honduras, Jamaica, Leeward Is., Mexico, Nicaragua, Panamá, Paraguay, Peru, Puerto Rico, the southwest Caribbean, Suriname, Venezuela and Venezuelan Antilles.

== Species ==
88 species are currently accepted.:

- Neea acuminatissima Standl.
- Neea altissima Poepp. & Endl.
- Neea alumnorum M.Pignal, Soares Filho & Romaniuc
- Neea amaruayensis Steyerm.
- Neea amplexicaulis Dwyer & M.V.Hayden
- Neea amplifolia Donn.Sm.
- Neea anisophylla Ernst
- Neea bahiensis D.S.Costa
- Neea bangii Rusby
- Neea bernardii Steyerm.
- Neea boliviana Standl.
- Neea bracteosa Steyerm.
- Neea brevipedunculata Steyerm.
- Neea brittonii Standl.
- Neea buxifolia (Hook.f.) Heimerl
- Neea cedenensis Steyerm.
- Neea chiapensis Standl.
- Neea clarkii Steyerm.
- Neea coccinea (Sw.) Heimerl
- Neea collina Heimerl
- Neea constricta Spruce ex J.A.Schmidt
- Neea constrictoides Heimerl
- Neea cubana M.A.Díaz
- Neea darienensis Dwyer & M.V.Hayden
- Neea davidsei Steyerm.
- Neea delicatula Standl.
- Neea demissa Heimerl
- Neea dimorphophylla Standl.
- Neea divaricata Poepp. & Endl.
- Neea duckei (Huber) Furlan
- Neea ekmanii Heimerl
- Neea elegans P.H.Allen
- Neea fagifolia Heimerl
- Neea floribunda Poepp. & Endl.
- Neea grandis Maguire & Steyerm.
- Neea guaiquinimae Steyerm.
- Neea gustaviifolia Aymard
- Neea hermaphrodita S.Moore
- Neea hirsuta Poepp. & Endl.
- Neea huachamacarae Steyerm.
- Neea ignicola Steyerm.
- Neea itanhaensis E.F.S.Rossetto & J.R.Ferraz
- Neea laxa Poepp. & Endl.
- Neea liesneri Steyerm.
- Neea longipedunculata Britton ex Rusby
- Neea macrophylla Poepp. & Endl.
- Neea madeirana Standl.
- Neea manaosensis D.S.Costa & C.A.S.Bat.
- Neea mapirensis Standl.
- Neea mapourioides Steyerm.
- Neea marahuacae Steyerm.
- Neea mollis Spruce ex J.A.Schmidt
- Neea neblinensis Maguire & Steyerm.
- Neea nigricans (Sw.) Fawc. & Rendle
- Neea obovata Spruce ex Heimerl
- Neea obovoides Harling
- Neea oppositifolia Ruiz & Pav.
- Neea orosiana Standl.
- Neea ovalifolia Spruce ex J.A.Schmidt
- Neea parimensis Steyerm.
- Neea parviflora Poepp. & Endl.
- Neea pendulina Heimerl
- Neea petenensis Lundell
- Neea pittieri Standl.
- Neea psychotrioides Donn.Sm.
- Neea pubescens Poepp. & Endl.
- Neea robusta Steyerm.
- Neea rubescens D.S.Costa
- Neea schwackeana Heimerl
- Neea sebastianii Steyerm.
- Neea shaferi Standl.
- Neea spruceana Heimerl
- Neea stenophylla Standl.
- Neea subcoccinea Heimerl
- Neea subglabrata Steyerm.
- Neea subpubescens Heimerl
- Neea tenuis Standl.
- Neea tepuiensis Steyerm.
- Neea theifera Oerst.
- Neea transparens Lundell
- Neea tristis Heimerl
- Neea turbinata Lundell
- Neea uleana (Heimerl) Furlan
- Neea urophylla Standl.
- Neea verticillata Ruiz & Pav.
- Neea virens Poepp. ex Heimerl
- Neea williamsii Standl.
- Neea woronovii Standl.
