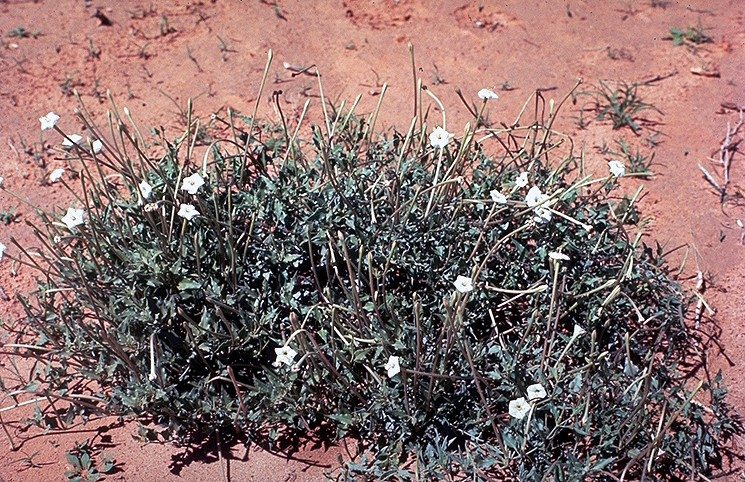
- Acleisanthes longiflora

Scientific classification
- Kingdom: Plantae
- Clade: Tracheophytes
- Clade: Angiosperms
- Clade: Eudicots
- Order: Caryophyllales
- Family: Nyctaginaceae
- Tribe: Nyctagineae
- Genus: Acleisanthes; A.Gray

Species
- 16 - See text

Synonyms
- Ammocodon Standl.; Selinocarpus A.Gray

= Acleisanthes =

Genus of flowering plants

Acleisanthes is a genus of flowering plants in the Bougainvillea family, Nyctaginaceae. There are currently 16 species. The generic name is derived from the Greek words ακλειοτος (akleistos), meaning "not closed", and ανθος (anthos), meaning "flower". Plants of this genus are known commonly as trumpets due to the elongated, open-ended shape of their flowers. These are arid-adapted perennials with thick taproots which are usually compact and low to the ground or slightly ascending. An individual plant may have cleistogamous (unopening and self-pollinating) flowers as well as opening flowers which are usually nocturnal as a water-saving adaptation and are pollinated by night-flying or crepuscular insects such as hawkmoths. Flowers are usually white, sometimes yellow. These plants are native to the Chihuahuan and Sonoran Deserts of Mexico and the United States.

== Taxonomy ==
In the year 2000 studies by Rachel A. Levin reclassified the members of two genera, Ammocodon and Selinocarpus, into the genus Acleisanthes.

== Selected species ==
- Acleisanthes acutifolia Standl. – needletip trumpets
- Acleisanthes angustifolia
- Acleisanthes anisophylla A.Gray – obliqueleaf trumpets
- Acleisanthes chenopodioides
- Acleisanthes crassifolia A.Gray – Texas trumpets
- Acleisanthes diffusa
- Acleisanthes longiflora A.Gray – angel trumpets, yerba de la rabia
- Acleisanthes nevadensis (Standl.) B.L.Turner – desert moonpod
- Acleisanthes obtusa (Choisy) Standl. – Berlandier's trumpets
- Acleisanthes parvifolia
- Acleisanthes wrightii (A.Gray) Benth. & Hook.f. ex Hemsl. – Wright's trumpets
