= Cyphomeris =

Scientific classification
- Kingdom: Plantae
- Clade: Tracheophytes
- Clade: Angiosperms
- Clade: Eudicots
- Order: Caryophyllales
- Family: Nyctaginaceae
- Genus: Cyphomeris; Standl.

Synonyms
- Lindenia M.Martens & Galeotti (1843), nom. illeg.; Senkenbergia S.Schauer (1847), nom. illeg.; Tinantia M.Martens & Galeotti (1844)

Genus of flowering plants

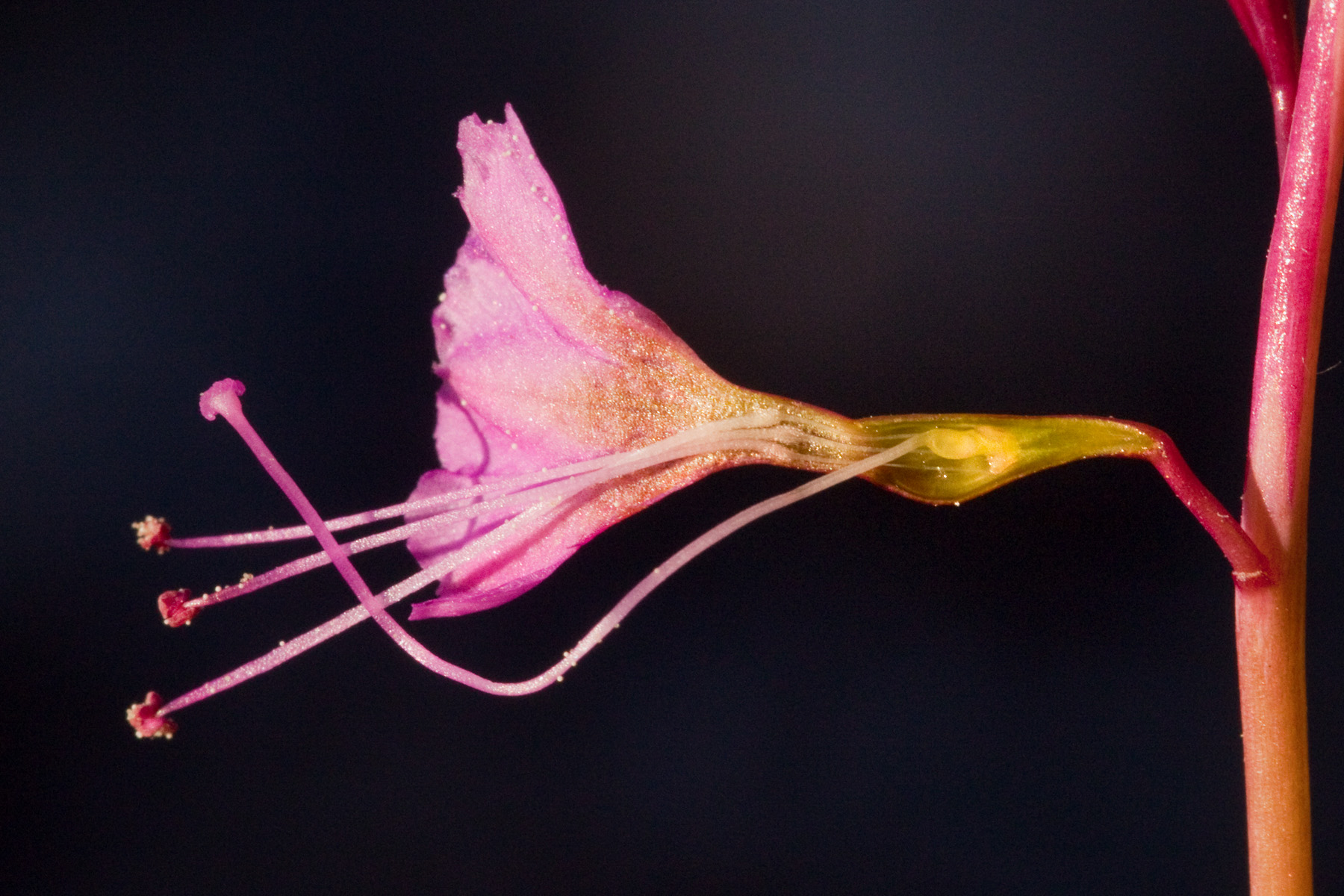
Cyphomeris gypsophiloides in New Mexico

Cyphomeris is a genus of flowering plants belonging to the family Nyctaginaceae.

Its native range is Southern Central USA to Central Mexico.

Species:

- Cyphomeris crassifolia (Standl.) Standl.
- Cyphomeris gypsophiloides (M.Martens & Galeotti) Standl.
