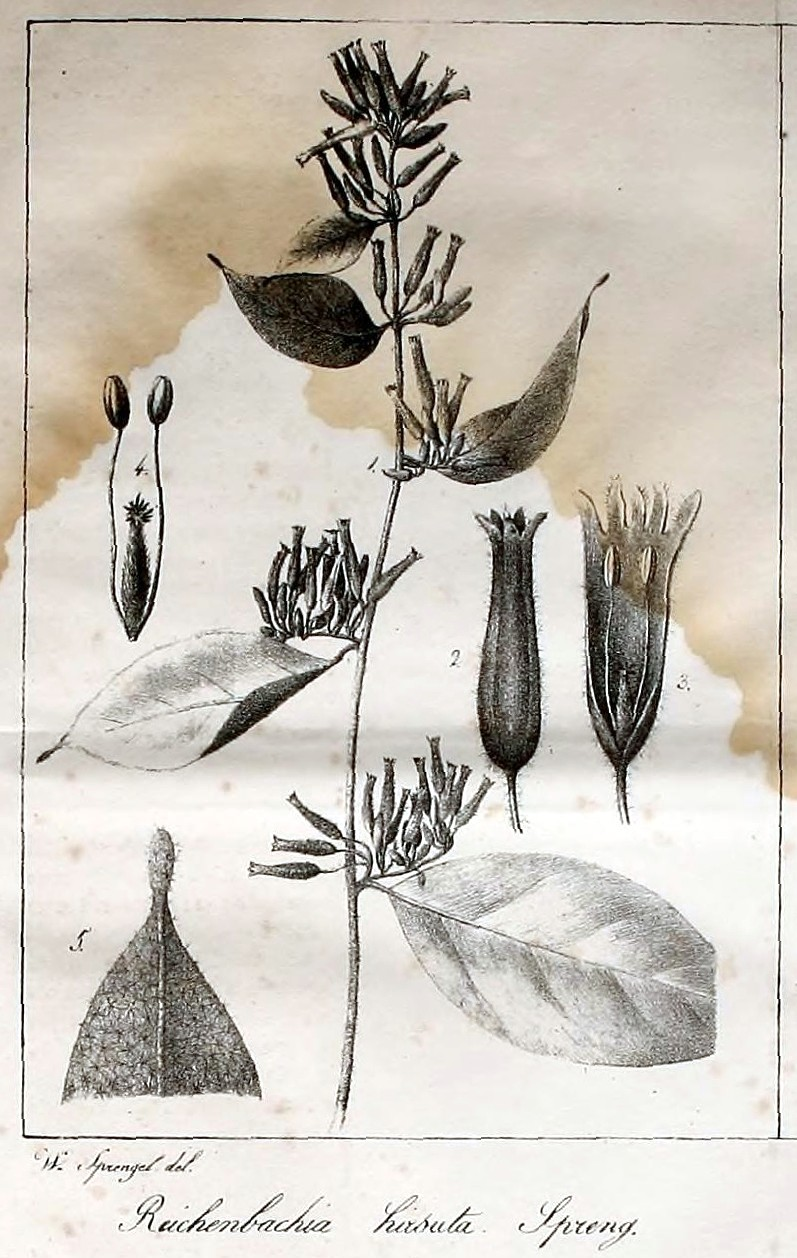

Scientific classification
- Kingdom: Plantae
- Clade: Tracheophytes
- Clade: Angiosperms
- Clade: Eudicots
- Order: Caryophyllales
- Family: Nyctaginaceae
- Genus: Reichenbachia; Spreng. (1823)
- Species: R. hirsuta

Binomial name
- Reichenbachia hirsuta Spreng. (1823)

Synonyms
- Elaeagnus paraguayensis D.Parodi (1878); Reichenbachia colombiana Standl. (1937); Reichenbachia paraguayensis (D.Parodi) Dugand & Daniel (1969)

= Reichenbachia =

Genus of flowering plants

Reichenbachia is a genus of flowering plants belonging to the family Nyctaginaceae, the family that also includes Bougainvillea. The genus contains a single species, Reichenbachia hirsuta.Spreng.

== See also ==
- Reichenbachia: Orchids Illustrated and Described, by Frederick Sander
