= Megalorhipida dulcis =

Scientific classification
- Domain: Eukaryota
- Kingdom: Animalia
- Phylum: Arthropoda
- Class: Insecta
- Order: Lepidoptera
- Family: Pterophoridae
- Genus: Megalorhipida
- Species: M. dulcis

Binomial name
- Megalorhipida dulcis (Walsingham, 1915)

Synonyms
- Trichoptilus zonites Walsingham, 1915

Species of plume moth

Megalorhipida dulcis is a species of moth in the genus Megalorhipida known from Belize, Costa Rica, and Mexico. Its host plants are Lantana urticifolia and Lantana glandulissimus. Moths of this species take flight in November and have a wingspan of about 11 millimetres (0.43 in).
