= Megalorhipida gielisi =

Scientific classification
- Domain: Eukaryota
- Kingdom: Animalia
- Phylum: Arthropoda
- Class: Insecta
- Order: Lepidoptera
- Family: Pterophoridae
- Genus: Megalorhipida
- Species: M. gielisi

Binomial name
- Megalorhipida gielisi Rose and Pooni, 2003

Species of plume moth

Megalorhipida gielisi is a moth of the family Pterophoridae that is known from India (Himachal Pradesh).

The wingspan is 13–14 millimetres (0.51–0.55 in).
