= Megalorhipida leptomeres =

Scientific classification
- Kingdom: Animalia
- Phylum: Arthropoda
- Class: Insecta
- Order: Lepidoptera
- Family: Pterophoridae
- Genus: Megalorhipida
- Species: M. leptomeres

Binomial name
- Megalorhipida leptomeres (Meyrick, 1886)

Synonyms
- Trichoptilus leptomeres Meyrick, 1886

Species of plume moth

Megalorhipida leptomeres is a moth of the family Pterophoridae. It is known from the Democratic Republic of Congo, Kenya, Tanzania, South Africa, La Réunion, Madagascar, the Seychelles, Oman and Yemen.
