= Megalorhipida paraiso =

Scientific classification
- Domain: Eukaryota
- Kingdom: Animalia
- Phylum: Arthropoda
- Class: Insecta
- Order: Lepidoptera
- Family: Pterophoridae
- Genus: Megalorhipida
- Species: M. paraiso

Binomial name
- Megalorhipida paraiso Gielis, 2006

Species of plume moth

Megalorhipida paraiso is a species of moth in the genus Megalorhipida known from Brazil. Moths of this species take flight in August and October and the females have a wingspan of about 10–11 millimetres (0.39–0.43 in). The specific name "paraiso" refers to Alto Paraiso, the locality from which the holotype specimen was collected.
