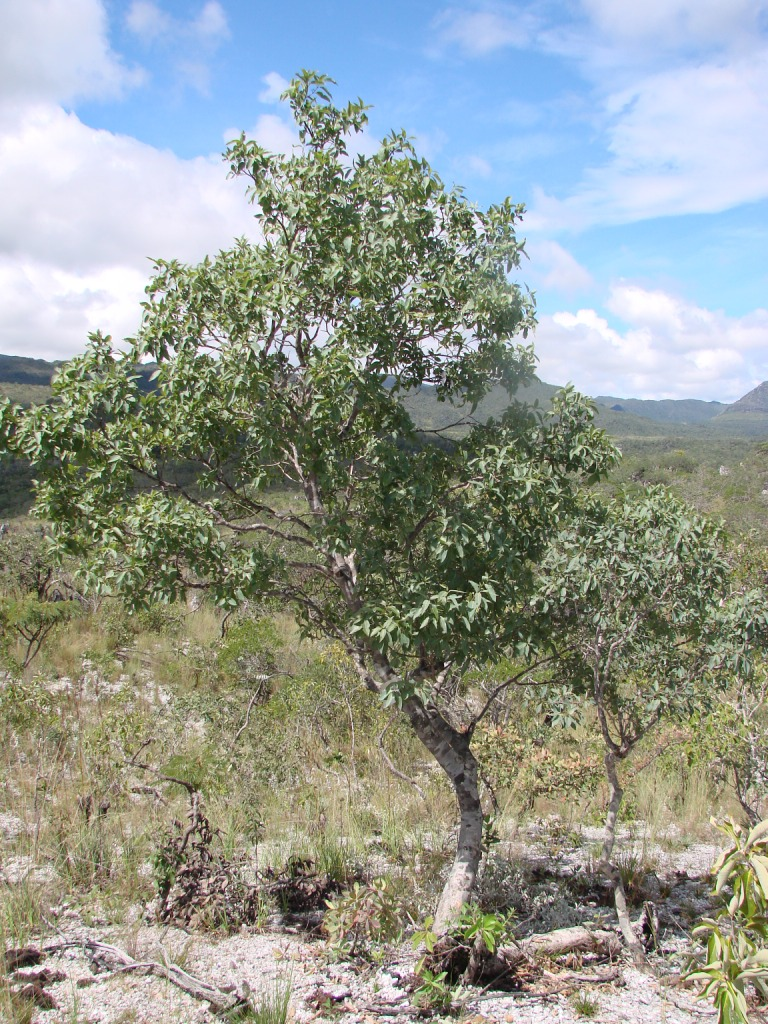
- Guapira graciliflora

Scientific classification
- Kingdom: Plantae
- Clade: Tracheophytes
- Clade: Angiosperms
- Clade: Eudicots
- Order: Caryophyllales
- Family: Nyctaginaceae
- Tribe: Pisonieae
- Genus: Guapira; Aubl.

Type species
- Guapira guianensis Aubl.

Synonyms
- Quapira Aubl., misspelling; Torrubia Vell.

= Guapira =

Genus of flowering plants

Guapira is a genus of Neotropical shrubs in the four o'clock family. Its species are native to Mesoamerica, South America, the West Indies, and the extreme southern part of Florida.

The following species are assigned to the genus:

1. Guapira acuminata
2. Guapira amacurensis
3. Guapira asperula
4. Guapira bolivarensis
5. Guapira boliviana
6. Guapira brevipetiolata
7. Guapira cafferana
8. Guapira cajalbanensis
9. Guapira campestris
10. Guapira clarensis
11. Guapira combretiflora
12. Guapira costaricana
13. Guapira cuspidata
14. Guapira discolor
15. Guapira domingensis
16. Guapira eggersiana
17. Guapira ferruginea
18. Guapira fragrans
19. Guapira glabriflora
20. Guapira globosa
21. Guapira graciliflora
22. Guapira guianensis
23. Guapira harrisiana
24. Guapira hasslerana
25. Guapira hirsuta
26. Guapira hoehnei
27. Guapira insularis
28. Guapira kanukuensis
29. Guapira laxiflora
30. Guapira leonis
31. Guapira ligustrifolia
32. Guapira loefgrenii
33. Guapira longicuspis
34. Guapira luteovirens
35. Guapira marcano-bertii
36. Guapira microphylla
37. Guapira myrtiflora
38. Guapira neblinensis
39. Guapira noxia
40. Guapira obtusata
41. Guapira obtusiloba
42. Guapira ophiticola
43. Guapira opposita
44. Guapira pacurero
45. Guapira paraguayensis
46. Guapira parvifolia
47. Guapira peninsularis
48. Guapira pernambucensis
49. Guapira petenensis
50. Guapira potosina
51. Guapira psammophila
52. Guapira pubescens
53. Guapira reticulata
54. Guapira riedeliana
55. Guapira rotundata
56. Guapira rotundifolia
57. Guapira rufescens
58. Guapira rusbyana
59. Guapira salicifolia
60. Guapira sancarlosiana
61. Guapira sipapoana
62. Guapira snethlagei
63. Guapira suborbiculata
64. Guapira suspensa
65. Guapira tomentosa
66. Guapira uberrima
67. Guapira uleana
68. Guapira venosa
69. Guapira witsbergeri
