= Caribea =

Scientific classification
- Kingdom: Plantae
- Clade: Tracheophytes
- Clade: Angiosperms
- Clade: Eudicots
- Order: Caryophyllales
- Family: Nyctaginaceae
- Genus: Caribea; Alain
- Species: C. litoralis

Binomial name
- Caribea litoralis Alain

Genus of flowering plants

Caribea is a genus of flowering plants belonging to the family Nyctaginaceae.

It contains a single species, Caribea litoralis, a subshrub native to eastern Cuba.
