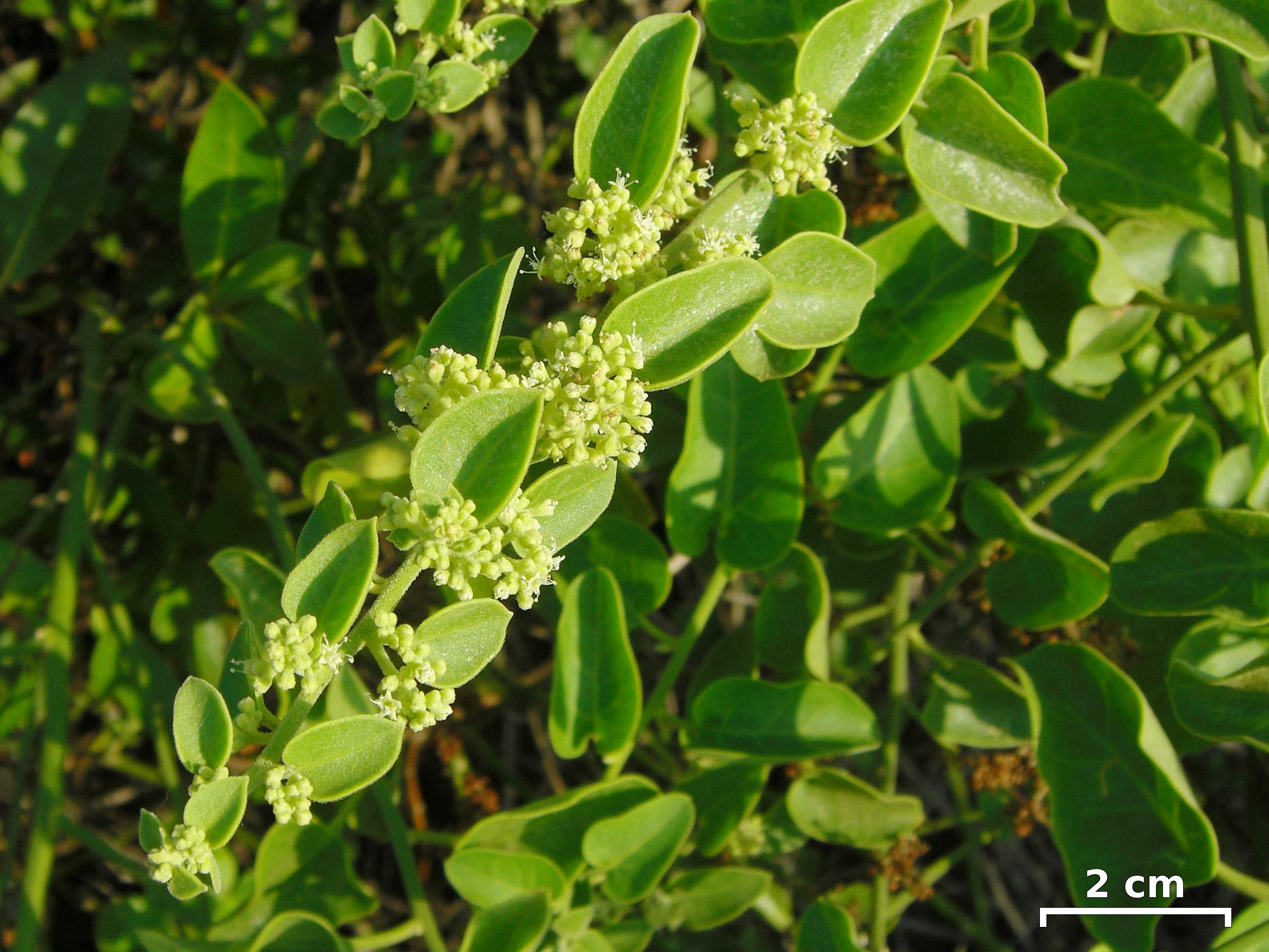

Scientific classification
- Kingdom: Plantae
- Clade: Tracheophytes
- Clade: Angiosperms
- Clade: Eudicots
- Order: Caryophyllales
- Family: Nyctaginaceae
- Tribe: Boldoeae
- Genus: Cryptocarpus; Kunth
- Species: C. pyriformis

Binomial name
- Cryptocarpus pyriformis Kunth

Synonyms
- Cryptocarpus cordifolius Moric.; Cryptocarpus pyriformis var. cordifolius (Moric.) Moq.; Salpianthus pyriformis (Kunth) Standl.

= Cryptocarpus =

Genus of flowering plants

Cryptocarpus pyriformis which is commonly known as salt bush or monte salado is native to the Galápagos Islands as well as mainland Ecuador and Peru. It is the sole representative of the genus Cryptocarpus.
