= Megalorhipida paradefectalis =

Scientific classification
- Kingdom: Animalia
- Phylum: Arthropoda
- Class: Insecta
- Order: Lepidoptera
- Family: Pterophoridae
- Genus: Megalorhipida
- Species: M. paradefectalis

Binomial name
- Megalorhipida paradefectalis Rose and Pooni, 2003

Species of plume moth

Megalorhipida paradefectalis is a moth of the family Pterophoridae. It occurs in Himachal Pradesh, India.

The wingspan is about 10 millimetres (0.39 in).
