= Megalorhipida prolai =

Scientific classification
- Domain: Eukaryota
- Kingdom: Animalia
- Phylum: Arthropoda
- Class: Insecta
- Order: Lepidoptera
- Family: Pterophoridae
- Genus: Megalorhipida
- Species: M. prolai

Binomial name
- Megalorhipida prolai Gibeaux, 1994

Species of plume moth

Megalorhipida prolai is a moth of the family Pterophoridae that is found in the Comoros, Eswatini, Madagascar, Mozambique and Zambia.
