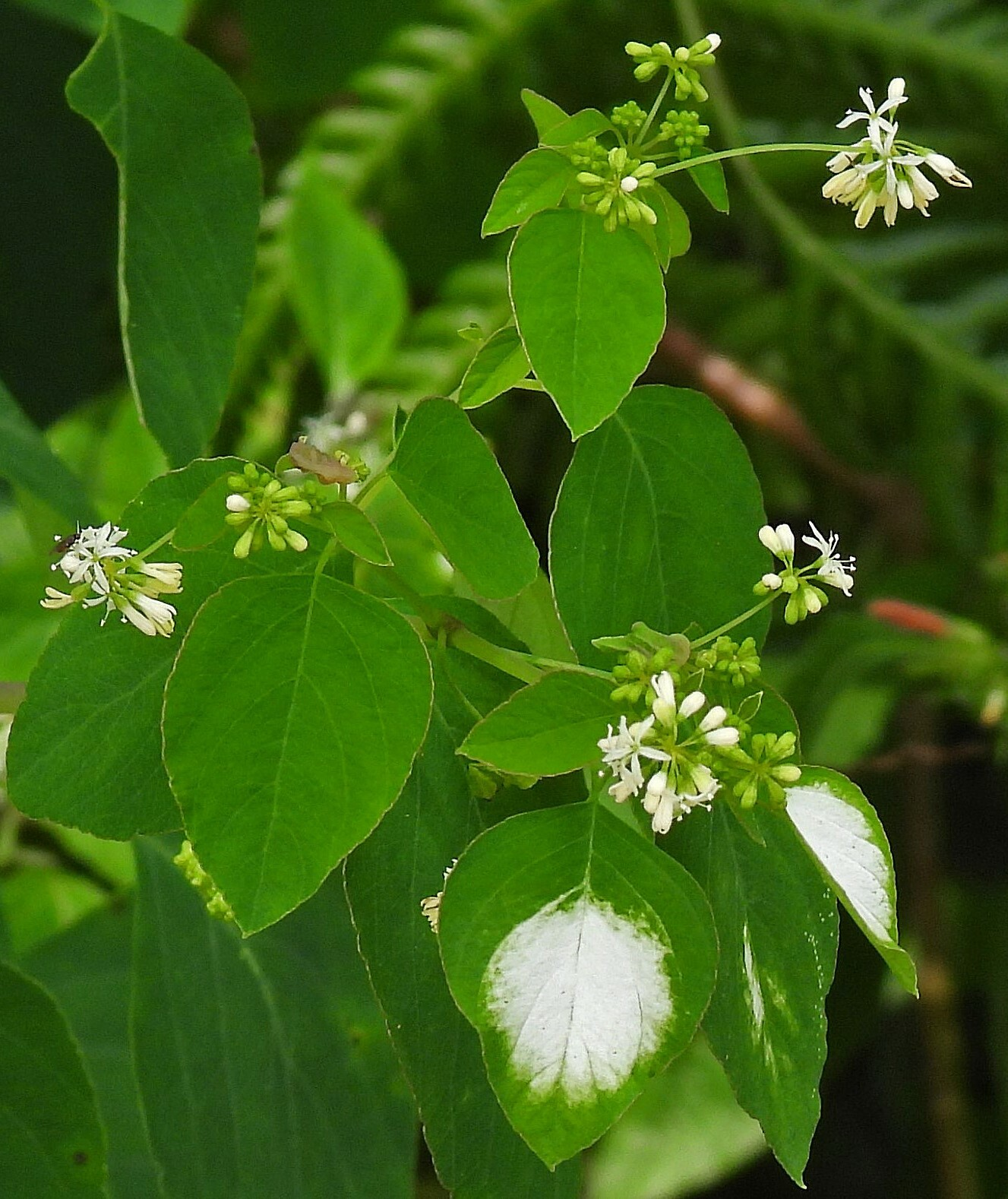
- Colignonia glomerata

Scientific classification
- Kingdom: Plantae
- Clade: Embryophytes
- Clade: Tracheophytes
- Clade: Spermatophytes
- Clade: Angiosperms
- Clade: Eudicots
- Order: Caryophyllales
- Family: Nyctaginaceae
- Genus: Colignonia; Endl.

= Colignonia =

Genus of flowering plants

Colignonia is a genus of flowering plants belonging to the family Nyctaginaceae. Its native range is Colombia to northern Argentina.

Species:

- Colignonia glomerata Griseb.
- Colignonia ovalifolia Heimerl
- Colignonia parviflora (Kunth) Choisy
- Colignonia pentoptera J.E.Bohlin
- Colignonia rufopilosa Kuntze
- Colignonia scandens Benth.
