= Megalorhipida madoris =

Scientific classification
- Domain: Eukaryota
- Kingdom: Animalia
- Phylum: Arthropoda
- Class: Insecta
- Order: Lepidoptera
- Family: Pterophoridae
- Genus: Megalorhipida
- Species: M. madoris

Binomial name
- Megalorhipida madoris Gielis & De Vos, 2007

Species of plume moth

Megalorhipida madoris is a moth of the family Pterophoridae that is known from Papua New Guinea
