= Megalorhipida fissa =

Scientific classification
- Domain: Eukaryota
- Kingdom: Animalia
- Phylum: Arthropoda
- Class: Insecta
- Order: Lepidoptera
- Family: Pterophoridae
- Genus: Megalorhipida
- Species: M. fissa

Binomial name
- Megalorhipida fissa Arenberger, 2002

Species of plume moth

Megalorhipida fissa is a moth of the family Pterophoridae that is known from Yemen.
