= Megalorhipida deboeri =

Scientific classification
- Kingdom: Animalia
- Phylum: Arthropoda
- Class: Insecta
- Order: Lepidoptera
- Family: Pterophoridae
- Genus: Megalorhipida
- Species: M. deboeri

Binomial name
- Megalorhipida deboeri Gielis, 2003

Species of plume moth

Megalorhipida deboeri is a species of moth in the genus Megalorhipida, known from Indonesia.

Moths in this species take flight in October, and have a wingspan of approximately 10 millimetres (0.39 in). The specific name "deboeri" refers to A.L. de Boer, an entomologist who collected specimens of the species.
