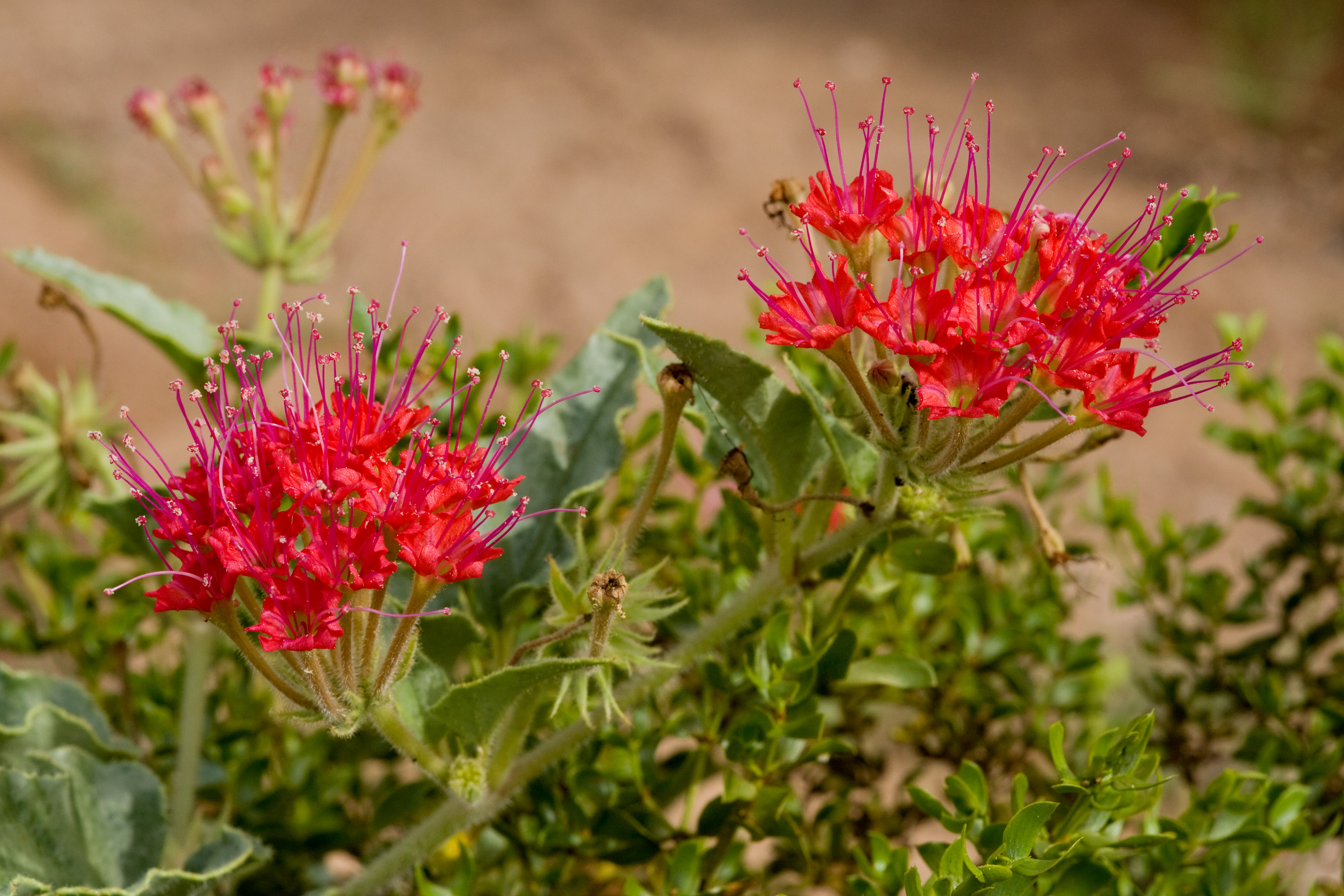
- Nyctaginia capitata

Scientific classification
- Kingdom: Plantae
- Clade: Tracheophytes
- Clade: Angiosperms
- Clade: Eudicots
- Order: Caryophyllales
- Family: Nyctaginaceae
- Genus: Nyctaginia; Choisy
- Species: N. capitata

Binomial name
- Nyctaginia capitata Choisy

Synonyms
- Boerhavia aggregata Pav. ex Choisy; Nyctaginia cockerellae A.Nelson; Nyctaginia ovata Choisy

= Nyctaginia =

Monotypic genus of plants

Nyctaginia is a monotypic genus of flowering plants belonging to the family Nyctaginaceae. The only species is Nyctaginia capitata (devil's bouquet).

Its native range is Southern Central USA to Northeastern Mexico .
