= Cephalotomandra =

Scientific classification
- Kingdom: Plantae
- Clade: Tracheophytes
- Clade: Angiosperms
- Clade: Eudicots
- Order: Caryophyllales
- Family: Nyctaginaceae
- Genus: Cephalotomandra; H.Karst. & Triana

Genus of flowering plants

Cephalotomandra is a genus of flowering plants belonging to the family Nyctaginaceae.

Its native range is Central America to Colombia.

Species:

- Cephalotomandra fragrans H.Karst. & Triana
- Cephalotomandra panamensis Standl.
