= Akrosida =

Scientific classification
- Kingdom: Plantae
- Clade: Tracheophytes
- Clade: Angiosperms
- Clade: Eudicots
- Clade: Rosids
- Order: Malvales
- Family: Malvaceae
- Subfamily: Malvoideae
- Tribe: Malveae
- Genus: Akrosida; Fryxell & Fuertes

Species
- 2 (see text)

Genus of flowering plants

Akrosida is a genus in the tribe Malveae, of the plant family Malvaceae.

== Species ==
The genus, as of 2010, consists of two species:

- Akrosida floribunda — endemic to the Dominican Republic.
- Akrosida macrophylla — endemic to Brazil.

Both species have very limited distributions.
