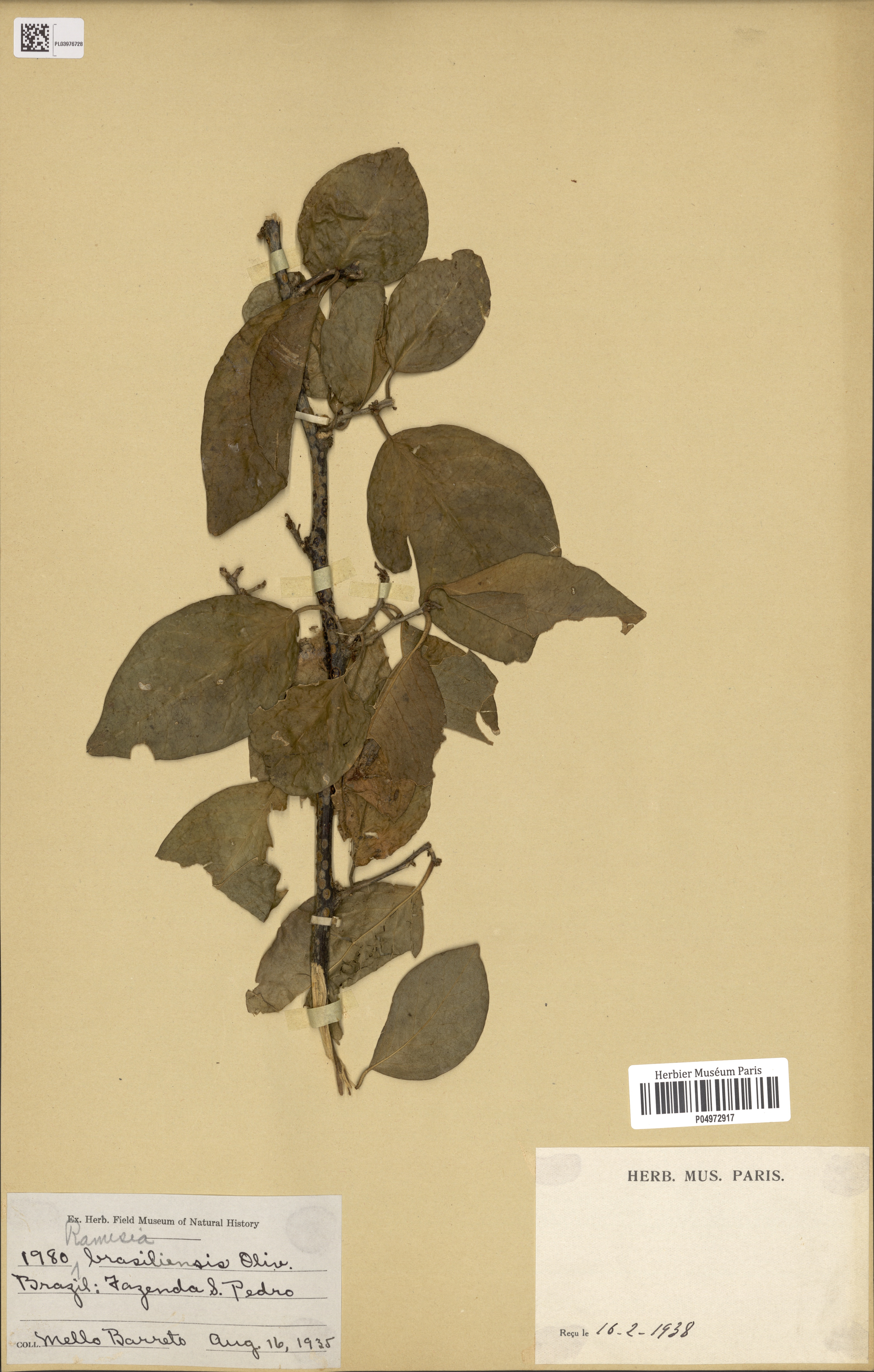

Scientific classification
- Kingdom: Plantae
- Clade: Tracheophytes
- Clade: Angiosperms
- Clade: Eudicots
- Order: Caryophyllales
- Family: Nyctaginaceae
- Genus: Ramisia; Glaz. ex Baill.
- Species: R. brasiliensis

Binomial name
- Ramisia brasiliensis Oliv.

= Ramisia =

Monotypic genus of plants

Ramisia is a monotypic genus of flowering plants belonging to the family Nyctaginaceae. The only species is Ramisia brasiliensis.

Its native range is Eastern Brazil.
