= Megalorhipida vivax =

Scientific classification
- Kingdom: Animalia
- Phylum: Arthropoda
- Class: Insecta
- Order: Lepidoptera
- Family: Pterophoridae
- Genus: Megalorhipida
- Species: M. vivax

Binomial name
- Megalorhipida vivax (Meyrick, 1909)

Synonyms
- Trichoptilus vivax Meyrick 1909

Species of plume moth

Megalorhipida vivax is a moth of the family Pterophoridae. It is known from South Africa and Gambia.
