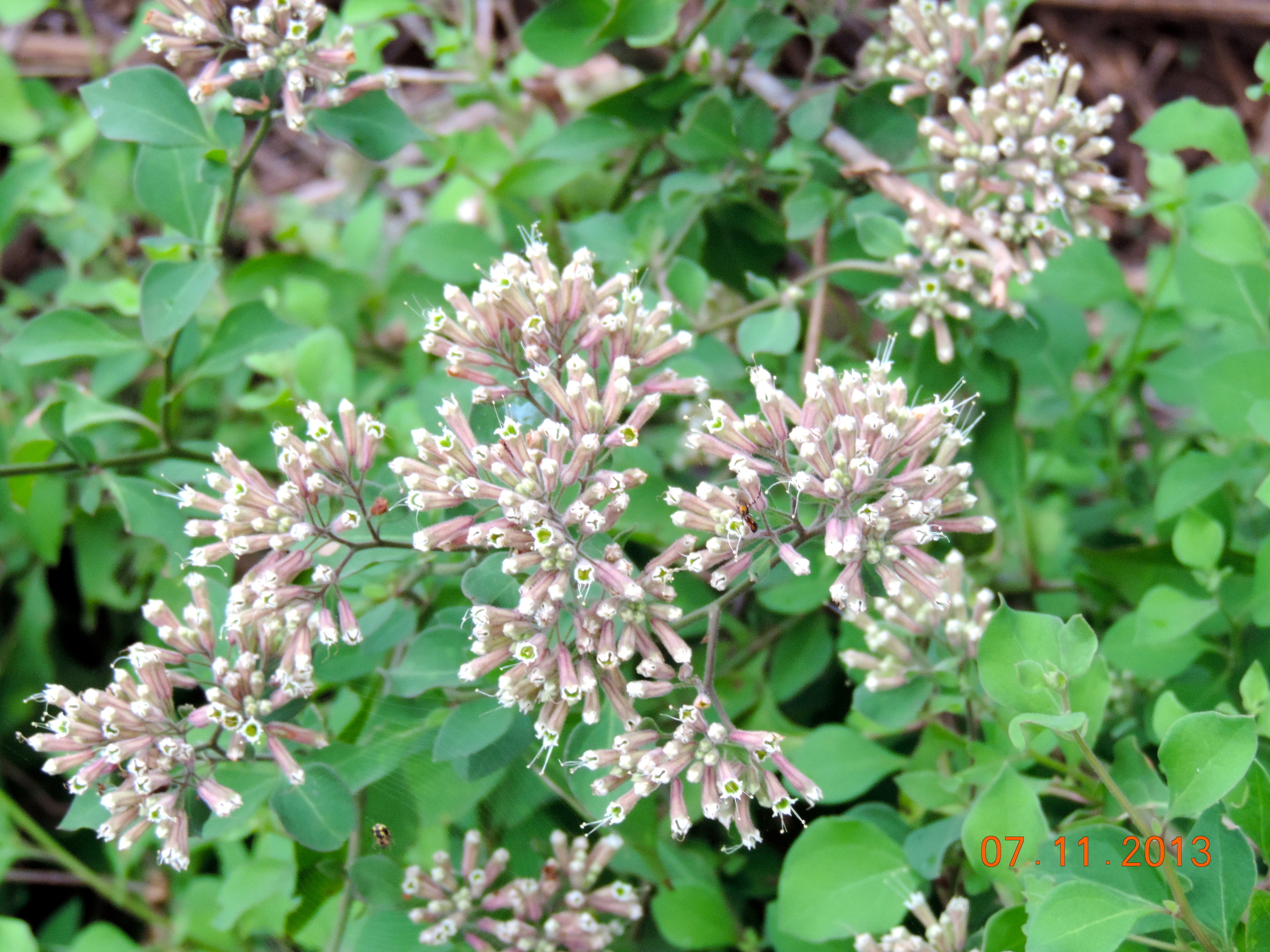
- In Mazatlán, México

Scientific classification
- Kingdom: Plantae
- Clade: Embryophytes
- Clade: Tracheophytes
- Clade: Spermatophytes
- Clade: Angiosperms
- Clade: Eudicots
- Order: Caryophyllales
- Family: Nyctaginaceae
- Genus: Salpianthus; Bonpl.

Synonyms
- Boldoa Cav. ex Lag.

= Salpianthus =

Genus of plants

Salpianthus is a genus of flowering plants belonging to the family Nyctaginaceae. Its native range is Mexico to Venezuela and Ecuador. It is also native to Cuba.

== Species ==
Five species are accepted.

- Salpianthus aequalis Standl.
- Salpianthus arenarius Bonpl.
- Salpianthus macrodontus Standl.
- Salpianthus purpurascens (Cav. ex Lag.) Hook. & Arn.
- Salpianthus standleyi Steyerm.
