= Megalorhipida parvula =

Scientific classification
- Kingdom: Animalia
- Phylum: Arthropoda
- Class: Insecta
- Order: Lepidoptera
- Family: Pterophoridae
- Genus: Megalorhipida
- Species: M. parvula

Binomial name
- Megalorhipida parvula Arenberger, 2010

Species of plume moth

Megalorhipida parvula is a moth of the family Pterophoridae that is known from Yemen.
