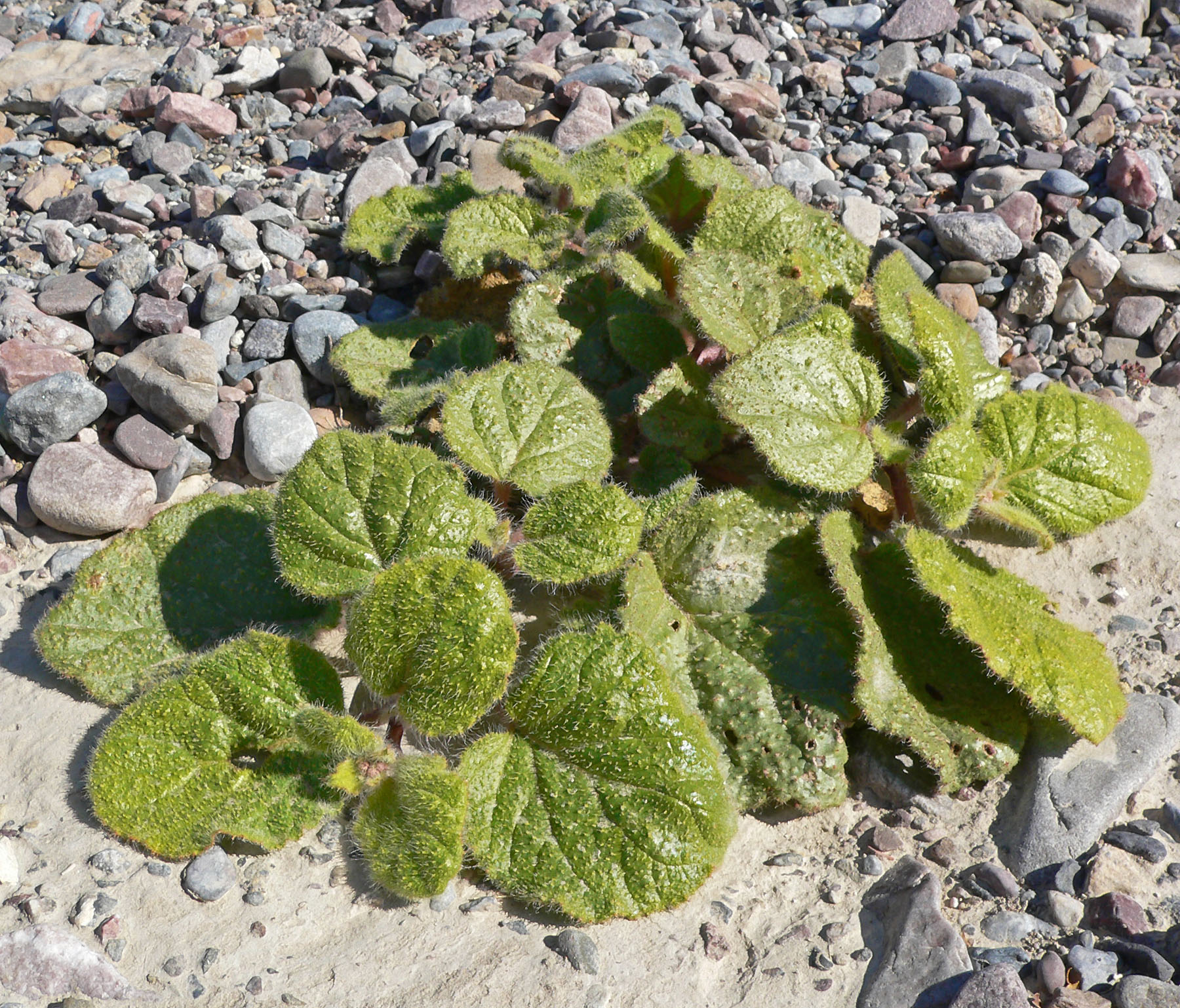
- Anulocaulis annulatus, Death Valley

Scientific classification
- Kingdom: Plantae
- Clade: Tracheophytes
- Clade: Angiosperms
- Clade: Eudicots
- Order: Caryophyllales
- Family: Nyctaginaceae
- Tribe: Nyctagineae
- Genus: Anulocaulis; Standl.

Species
- 5 - See text

= Anulocaulis =

Genus of plants

Anulocaulis is a small genus of flowering plants known generally as ringstems. These five species are sometimes treated as members of genus Boerhavia. Ringstems are thickly-rooted perennial wildflowers with glutinous brown bands at their stem internodes, the trait which gives them their common and Latin names. They bear tubular flowers at the tops of their stems. Ringstems are native to North America.

== Species ==
- Anulocaulis annulatus - valley ringstem
- Anulocaulis eriosolenus - Big Bend ringstem
- Anulocaulis gypsogenus - gypsum ringstem
- Anulocaulis leiosolenus - southwestern ringstem
- Anulocaulis reflexus - Texas ringstem

== See also ==
- Nyctaginaceae
