= Akrosida macrophylla =

Conservation status
- Endangered (IUCN 3.1)

Scientific classification
- Kingdom: Plantae
- Clade: Tracheophytes
- Clade: Angiosperms
- Clade: Eudicots
- Clade: Rosids
- Order: Malvales
- Family: Malvaceae
- Genus: Akrosida
- Species: A. macrophylla

Binomial name
- Akrosida macrophylla (Ulbr.) Fryxell & Fuertes

Synonyms
- Abutilon claussenii Krapov.; Bastardia macrophylla Ulbr.

Species of flowering plant

Akrosida macrophylla, commonly known as the bigleaf akrosida, is a species of plant found in Brazil. It was first described by Oskar Eberhard Ulbrich, who called it Bastardia macrophylla.
