= Leucaster =

Scientific classification
- Kingdom: Plantae
- Clade: Tracheophytes
- Clade: Angiosperms
- Clade: Eudicots
- Order: Caryophyllales
- Family: Nyctaginaceae
- Genus: Leucaster; Choisy
- Species: L. caniflorus

Binomial name
- Leucaster caniflorus Choisy

Synonyms
- Reichenbachia caniflora Mart.

Genus of plants

Leucaster is a genus of flowering plants belonging to the family Nyctaginaceae.

It includes a single species, Leucaster caniflorus, a climber native to southeastern Brazil.
