= Megalorhipida pseudodefectalis =

Scientific classification
- Kingdom: Animalia
- Phylum: Arthropoda
- Class: Insecta
- Order: Lepidoptera
- Family: Pterophoridae
- Genus: Megalorhipida
- Species: M. pseudodefectalis

Binomial name
- Megalorhipida pseudodefectalis (Gielis, 1989)

Synonyms
- Megalorrhipida pseudodefectalis Gielis, 1989

Species of plume moth

Megalorhipida pseudodefectalis is a species of moth in the genus Megalorhipida known from Argentina, Brazil, Chile, and Paraguay. Its host plants are Eupatorium betonicaeforme, Barrosoa betonicaeformis, and Senecio oleosus. Moths of this species take flight in February, March, and December and have a wingspan of 15-18 millimetres.
