= Cuscatlania =

Scientific classification
- Kingdom: Plantae
- Clade: Tracheophytes
- Clade: Angiosperms
- Clade: Eudicots
- Order: Caryophyllales
- Family: Nyctaginaceae
- Genus: Cuscatlania; Standl.
- Species: C. vulcanicola

Binomial name
- Cuscatlania vulcanicola Standl.

Genus of flowering plants

Cuscatlania is a genus of flowering plants belonging to the family Nyctaginaceae.

It contains a single species, Cuscatlania vulcanicola, a scrambling perennial native to El Salvador and Honduras in Central America.
