= Belemia =

Scientific classification
- Kingdom: Plantae
- Clade: Tracheophytes
- Clade: Angiosperms
- Clade: Eudicots
- Order: Caryophyllales
- Family: Nyctaginaceae
- Genus: Belemia; Pires

Genus of flowering plants

Belemia is a genus of flowering plants belonging to the family Nyctaginaceae.

It includes two species native to Brazil.

- Belemia cordata Harley & Giul.
- Belemia fucsioides Pires
