= Megalorhipida dubiosa =

Scientific classification
- Domain: Eukaryota
- Kingdom: Animalia
- Phylum: Arthropoda
- Class: Insecta
- Order: Lepidoptera
- Family: Pterophoridae
- Genus: Megalorhipida
- Species: M. dubiosa

Binomial name
- Megalorhipida dubiosa Gielis, 2006

Species of plume moth

Megalorhipida dubiosa is a species of moth in the genus Megalorhipida known from Brazil. Males in this species have a wingspan of about 10 millimetres (0.39 in). Moths of this species fly in September. The specific name "dubiosa" refers to doubts over the validity of the species.
