= Grajalesia =

Scientific classification
- Kingdom: Plantae
- Clade: Tracheophytes
- Clade: Angiosperms
- Clade: Eudicots
- Order: Caryophyllales
- Family: Nyctaginaceae
- Genus: Grajalesia; Miranda
- Species: G. fasciculata

Binomial name
- Grajalesia fasciculata (Standl.) Miranda

Synonyms
- Pisonia fasciculata Standl. (1911) (basionym); Grajalesia ferruginea Miranda

Genus of flowering plants

Grajalesia is a genus of flowering plants in the family Nyctaginaceae. It includes a single species, Grajalesia fasciculata, a scrambling tree native to southern Mexico (Chiapas and Oaxaca) and Central America (Guatemala, El Salvador, Honduras, and Nicaragua).
