= Akrosida floribunda =

Scientific classification
- Kingdom: Plantae
- Clade: Tracheophytes
- Clade: Angiosperms
- Clade: Eudicots
- Clade: Rosids
- Order: Malvales
- Family: Malvaceae
- Genus: Akrosida
- Species: A. floribunda

Binomial name
- Akrosida floribunda Fryxell & Clase

Species of tree

Akrosida floribunda is native to the Dominican Republic. It grows as a tree, bearing young branches that lose their stellate pubescence with age. Leaves - alternate, broadly ovate and palmately seven-veined - bear subtle, crenate-dentate teeth and abaxial surfaces colored more palely than their adaxial surfaces. Flowers - arranged in axillary fascicles - bear a gamosepalous but lobed calyx and clawed petals with or without two basal auriculae.
