= Okenia hypogaea =

Scientific classification
- Kingdom: Plantae
- Clade: Tracheophytes
- Clade: Angiosperms
- Clade: Eudicots
- Order: Caryophyllales
- Family: Nyctaginaceae
- Genus: Okenia; Schltdl. & Cham.
- Species: O. hypogaea

Binomial name
- Okenia hypogaea Schltdl. & Cham.

Synonyms
- Okenia grandiflora Standl.; Okenia parviflora Paul G.Wilson; Okenia rosei Standl.

Species of flowering plant

Okenia hypogaea, commonly known as beach peanut or burrowing four-o'clock, is a species of flowering plant in the family Nyctaginaceae. It is an annual native to tropical North America, ranging from northern Mexico to Nicaragua and to southern Florida. It is the sole species in genus Okenia.
