= Andradea =

Scientific classification
- Kingdom: Plantae
- Clade: Tracheophytes
- Clade: Angiosperms
- Clade: Eudicots
- Order: Caryophyllales
- Family: Nyctaginaceae
- Genus: Andradea; Allemão
- Species: A. floribunda

Binomial name
- Andradea floribunda Allemão

Genus of flowering plants

Andradea is a genus of flowering plants belonging to the family Nyctaginaceae.

Its contains a single species, Andradea floribunda, a tree endemic to eastern Brazil.
