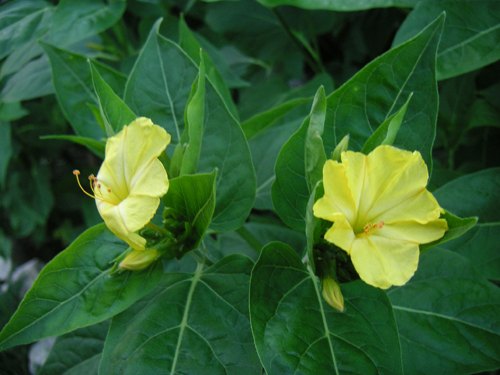
- Garden Four O'Clock (Mirabilis jalapa) flowers

Scientific classification
- Kingdom: Plantae
- Clade: Tracheophytes
- Clade: Angiosperms
- Clade: Eudicots
- Order: Caryophyllales
- Family: Nyctaginaceae; Juss.

Tribes
- Boldoeae; Bougainvilleeae; Caribeeae; Colignonieae; Leucastereae; Nyctagineae; Pisonieae

Synonyms
- Allioniaceae Horan.; Bougainvilleaceae J.Agardh; Mirabilidaceae W.R.B.Oliv.; Pisoniaceae J.Agardh

= Nyctaginaceae =

Family of flowering plants

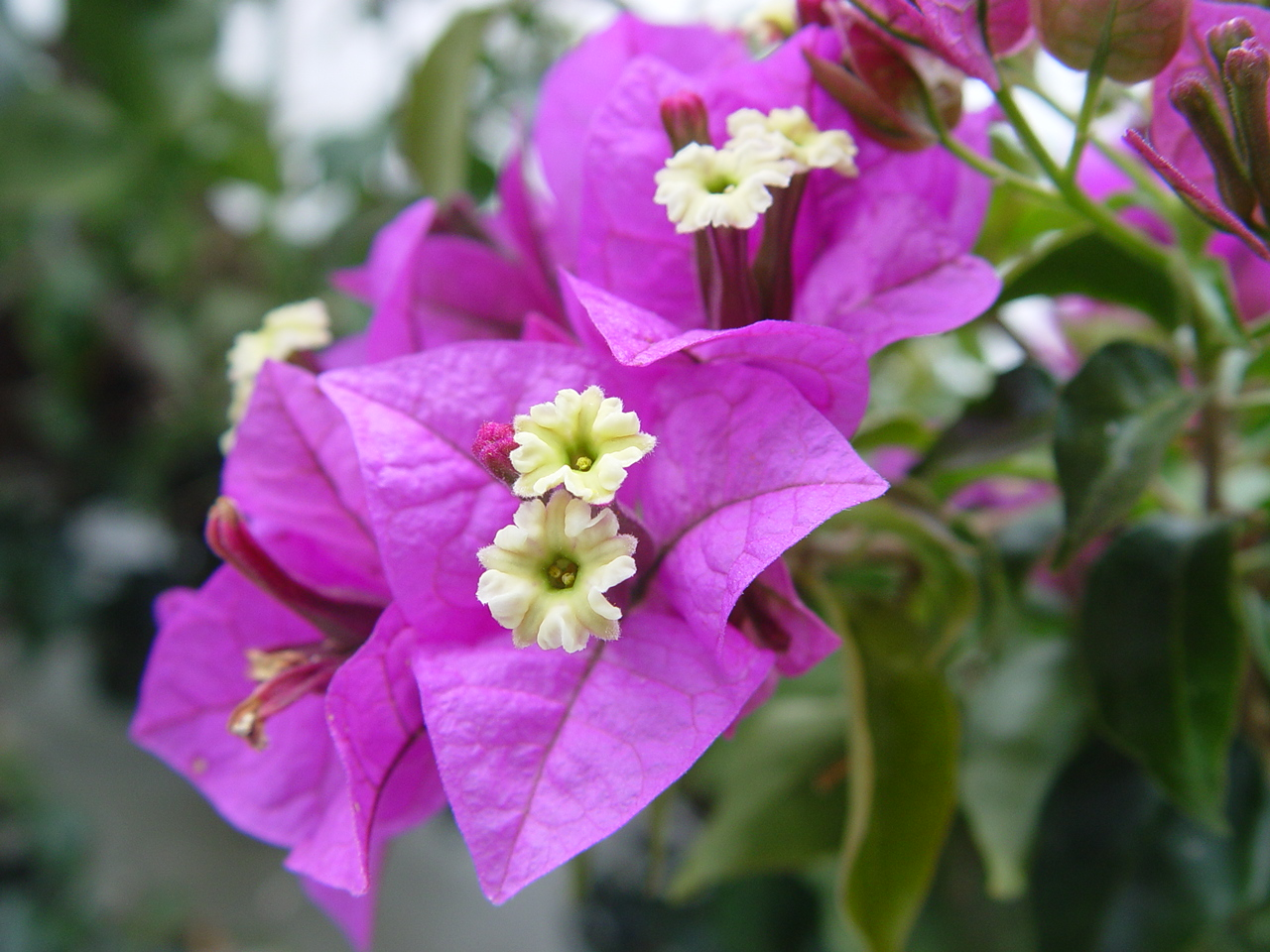
Bougainvillea glabra

Nyctaginaceae, the four o'clock family, is a family of around 33 genera and 290 species of flowering plants, widely distributed in tropical and subtropical regions, with a few representatives in temperate regions. The family has a distinctive fruit type called an accessory fruit or anthocarp, and many genera have extremely large (>100 μm) pollen grains.

The family has been almost universally recognized by plant taxonomists. The APG II system (2003; unchanged from the APG system of 1998), assigns it to the order Caryophyllales in the clade core eudicots.

A phylogenetic study by Levin has justified the combination of Selinocarpus and Ammocodon into the genus Acleisanthes. The genus Izabalea is now considered a synonym of Agonandra, a genus in Opiliaceae. A more recent study by Douglas and Manos clarified the relationships among almost all of the genera in the family and demonstrated that a substantial diversification of herbaceous genera has occurred in arid North America. Many genera of Nyctaginaceae possess unusual characters. Notable examples include sticky bands on the stems between the nodes, cleistogamous flowers (which self-pollinate without opening), or gypsophily, the ability to grow on soils with a high concentration of gypsum.

== Genera ==
32 genera are accepted.

Tribe Boldoeae

- Cryptocarpus Kunth
- Salpianthus Humb. & Bonpl. (synonym Boldoa Cav. ex Lag.)

Tribe Bougainvilleeae

- Belemia Pires
- Bougainvillea Comm. ex Juss.
- Phaeoptilum Radlk.

Tribe Caribeeae

- Caribea

Tribe Colignonieae

- Colignonia

Tribe Nyctagineae

- Abronia Juss.
- Acleisanthes A.Gray
- Allionia L.
- Anulocaulis Standl.
- Boerhavia L.
- Commicarpus Standl.
- Cuscatlania Standl.
- Cyphomeris Standl.
- Mirabilis L.
- Nyctaginia Choisy
- Okenia Schlecht. & Cham.
- Tripterocalyx (Torr.) Hook.

Tribe Leucastereae

- Andradea Allemão
- Leucaster Choisy
- Ramisia Glaz. ex Baill.
- Reichenbachia Spreng.

Tribe Pisonieae

- Ceodes J.R.Forst. & G.Forst.
- Cephalotomandra H.Karst. & Triana
- Grajalesia Miranda
- Guapira Aubl.
- Neea Ruiz & Pav.
- Neeopsis Lundell
- Pisonia L.
- Pisoniella (Heimerl) Standl.
- Rockia Heimerl

The extinct genus Mennegoxylon has been provisionally placed in the family.

== Uses ==
The family contains one food crop, the mauka (Mirabilis extensa), a root vegetable of minor local importance in the Andes. Garden Four-O'Clocks Mirabilis jalapa species are grown as ornamental plants, as are species of Bougainvillea (Bougainvillea glabra, B. spectabilis, and numerous hybrids), Bougainvillea and Abronia are commonly cultivated in warmer regions.
