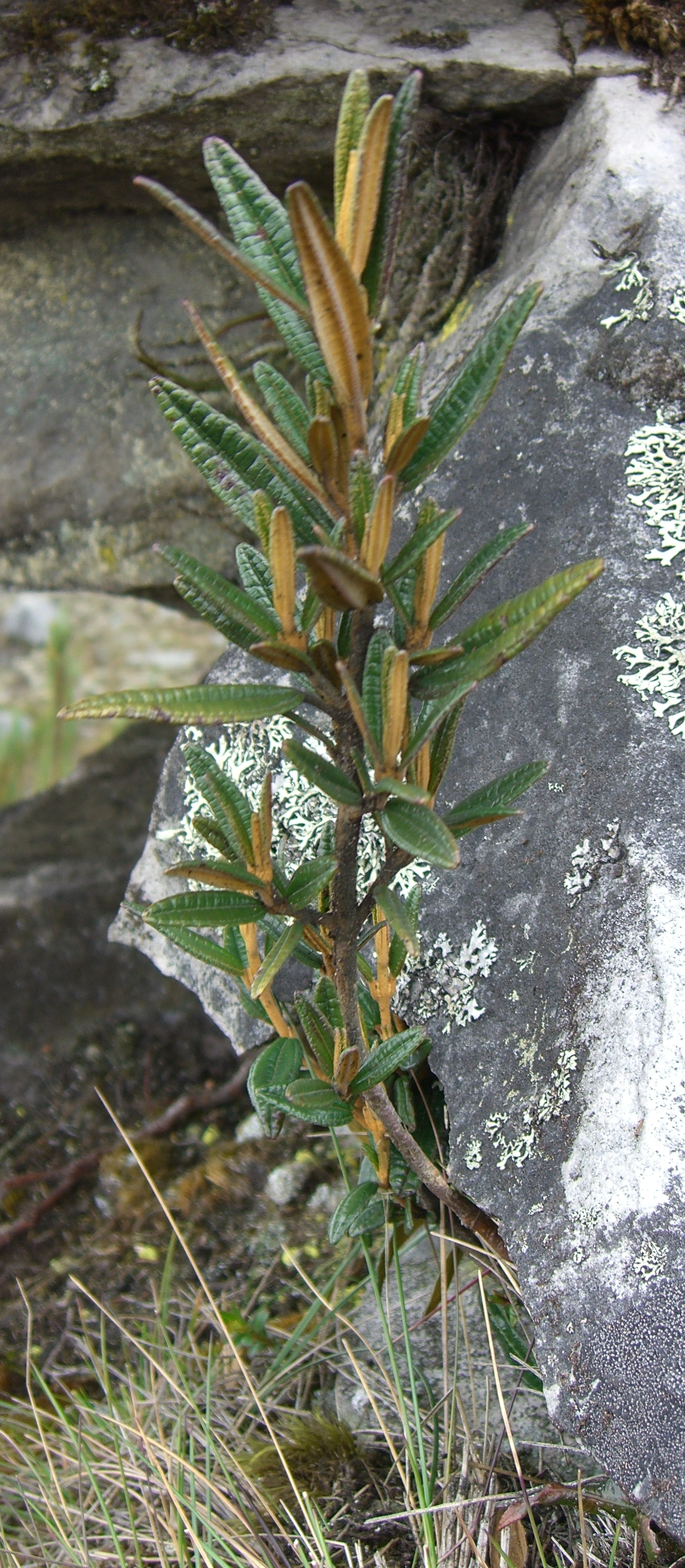

Scientific classification
- Kingdom: Plantae
- Clade: Tracheophytes
- Clade: Angiosperms
- Clade: Eudicots
- Clade: Rosids
- Order: Myrtales
- Family: Melastomataceae
- Genus: Miconia
- Species: M. salicifolia

Binomial name
- Miconia salicifolia Naudin

= Miconia salicifolia =

Species of plant

Miconia salicifolia is a species of shrub in the family Melastomataceae. It is native to South America.
