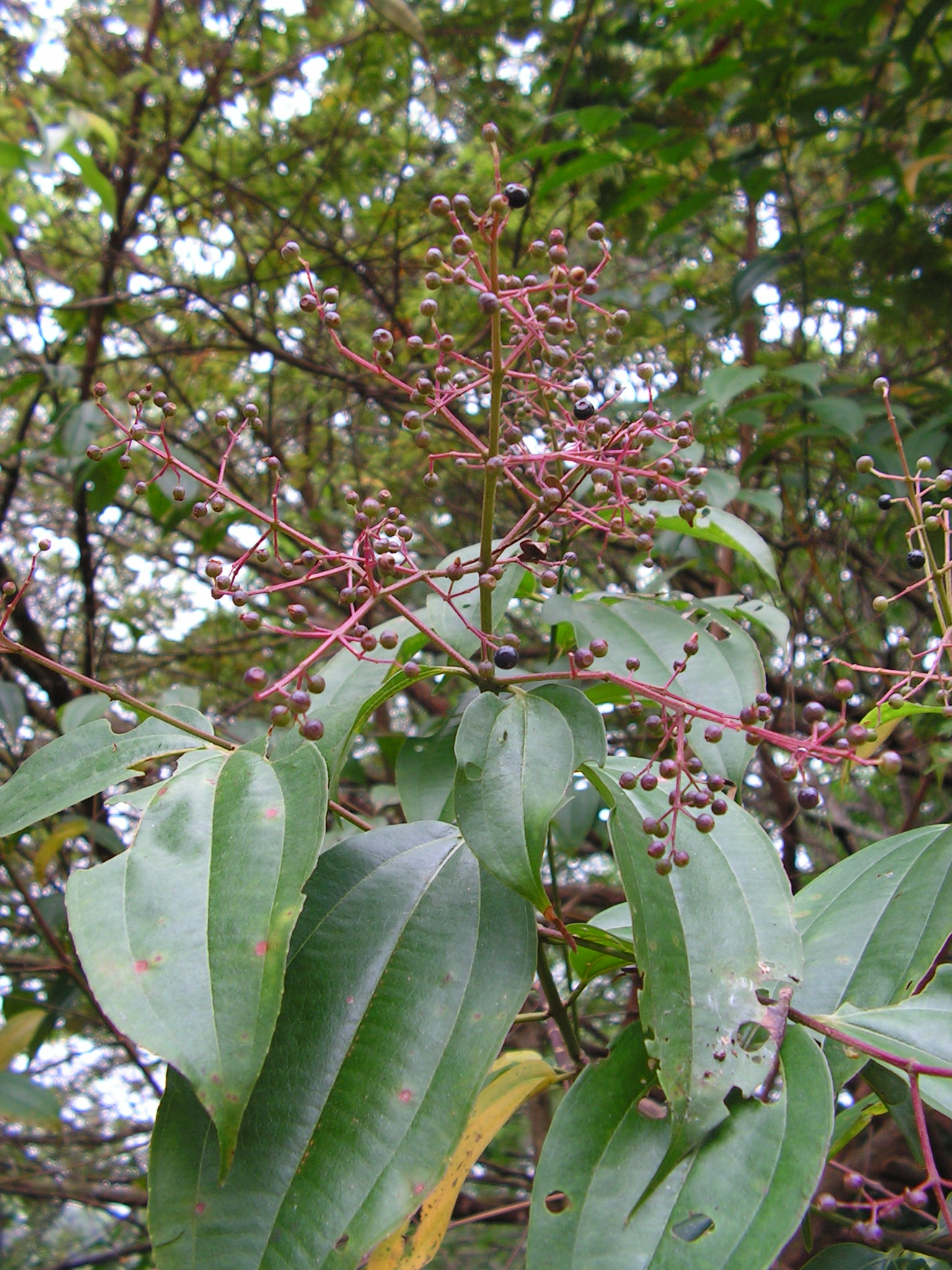
- Leaves and fruits

Scientific classification
- Kingdom: Plantae
- Clade: Tracheophytes
- Clade: Angiosperms
- Clade: Eudicots
- Clade: Rosids
- Order: Myrtales
- Family: Melastomataceae
- Genus: Miconia
- Species: M. minutiflora

Binomial name
- Miconia minutiflora (Bonpl.) DC.

= Miconia minutiflora =

Species of tree

Miconia minutiflora is a species of tree in the family Melastomataceae. It is native to North and South America.
