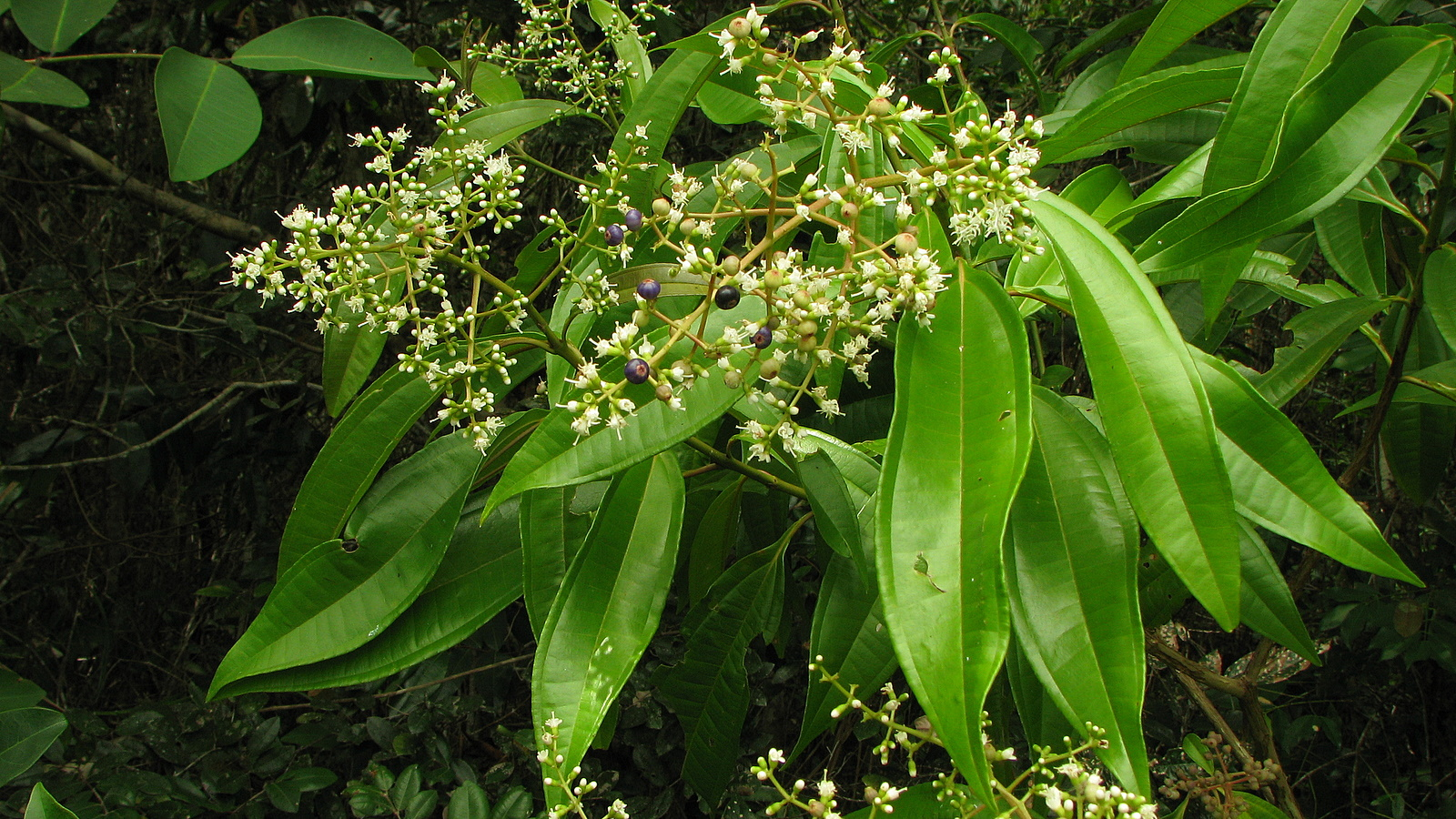
- Leaves and inflorescences

Conservation status
- Least Concern (IUCN 3.1)

Scientific classification
- Kingdom: Plantae
- Clade: Tracheophytes
- Clade: Angiosperms
- Clade: Eudicots
- Clade: Rosids
- Order: Myrtales
- Family: Melastomataceae
- Genus: Miconia
- Species: M. prasina

Binomial name
- Miconia prasina (Sw.) DC.

= Miconia prasina =

Species of tree

Miconia prasina is a species of tree in the family Melastomataceae. It is native to Mexico, Central America, the Caribbean and South America.
