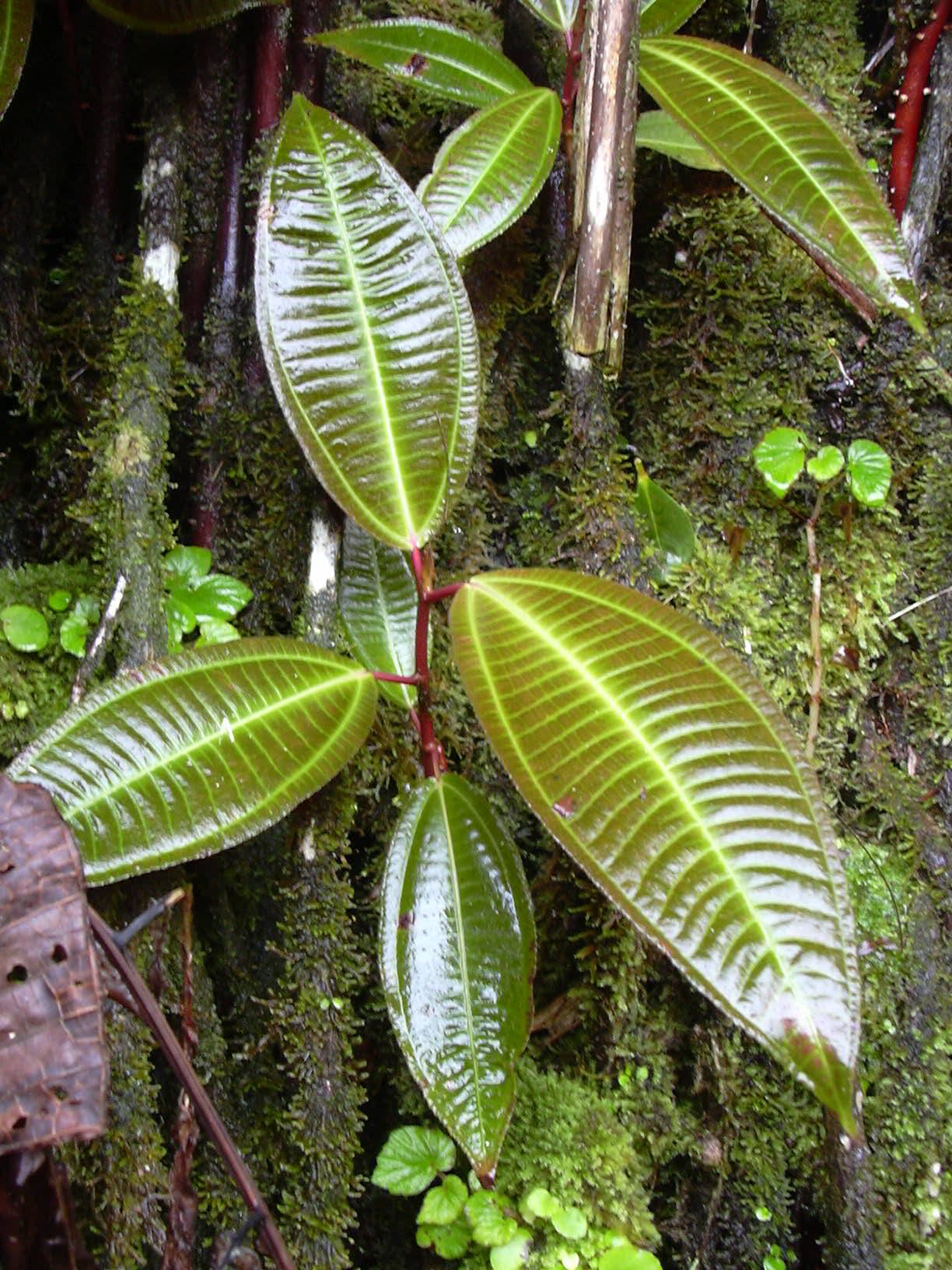
- Velvet tree (Miconia calvescens)

Scientific classification
- Kingdom: Plantae
- Clade: Embryophytes
- Clade: Tracheophytes
- Clade: Angiosperms
- Clade: Eudicots
- Clade: Rosids
- Order: Myrtales
- Family: Melastomataceae
- Genus: Miconia; Ruiz & Pavón

Species
- Around 1,900, see List of Miconia species

Synonyms
- Synonymy: Abrophaes Raf. (1838), nom. superfl.; Acidodendron Kuntze (1891), orth. var.; Acinodendron Raf. (1838); Acinolis Raf. (1838); Amphitoma Gleason (1925); Anaectocalyx Triana ex Benth. & Hook.f. (1867); Angeja Vand. (1771), nom. rej.; Antisola Raf. (1838); Augustinea A.St.-Hil. & Naudin (1844); Auliphas Raf. (1838); Calophysa DC. (1828); Calycogonium DC. (1828); Capitellaria Naudin (1852); Catachaenia Griseb. (1860); Catocoryne Hook.f. (1867); Catonia P.Browne (1756); Chaenanthera Rich. ex DC. (1828); Chaenopleura Rich. ex DC. (1828); Charianthus D.Don (1823); Chiloporus Naudin (1845); Chitonia D.Don (1823); Chrysophora Cham. ex Triana (1871 publ. 1872); Clastilix Raf. (1838); Clidemia D.Don (1823); Clidemiastrum Naudin (1852); Conostegia D.Don (1823); Copedesma Gleason (1925); Cremanium D.Don (1823); Cryptophysa Standl. & J.F.Macbr. (1929); Cyanophyllum Naudin (1852); Cyathanthera Pohl (1831); Dancera Raf. (1838); Decaraphe Miq. (1840); Diplochita DC. (1828); Diplodonta H.Karst. (1857); Ekmaniocharis Urb. (1921); Eurychaenia Griseb. (1860); Eustegia Raf. (1838); Folomfis Raf. (1838); Fothergilla Aubl. (1775), nom. illeg.; Gallasia Mart. ex DC. (1828); Glossocentrum Crueg. (1847); Gonema Raf. (1838); Graffenrieda Mart. (1832), nom. illeg.; Happia Neck. (1790), not validly publ.; Harrera Macfad. (1837); Hartigia Miq. (1845); Heterotrichum DC. (1828), nom. illeg.; Hormocalyx Gleason (1935); Hosangia Neck. (1790), not validly publ.; Icaria J.F.Macbr. (1929); Jucunda Cham. (1835); Killipia Gleason (1925); Leandra Raddi (1820); Leonicenia Scop. (1777), nom. rej.; Lieutautia Buc'hoz (1779), nom. superfl.; Lomanthera Raf. (1838); Maieta Aubl. (1775); Mecranium Hook.f. (1867); Menendezia Britton (1925); Miconiastrum Bonpl. ex Naudin (1851); Microphysa Naudin (1851 publ. 1850), nom. illeg.; Microphysca Naudin (1852); Mommsenia Urb. & Ekman (1926); Muelleramra Kuntze (1891); Myrmidone Mart. (1832); Naudinia A.Rich. (1846), nom. rej.; Necramium Britton (1924); Octella Raf. (1838); Octomeris Naudin (1845), nom. superfl.; Octonum Raf. (1838); Oxymeris DC. (1828); Pachyanthus A.Rich. (1846); Pachydesmia Gleason (1948); Platycentrum Naudin (1852); Pleiochiton Naudin ex A.Gray (1853); Pleurochaenia Griseb. (1860); Pogonorhynchus Crueg. (1847); Prosanerpis S.F.Blake (1922); Pterocladon Hook.f. (1867); Rupestrea R.Goldenb., Almeda & Michelang. (2015); Sagraea DC. (1828); Sarcomeris Naudin (1851); Schizanthera Turcz. (1862); Sericola Raf. (1838); Soltmannia Naudin (1851 publ. 1850); Sphaerogyne Naudin (1851); Staphidiastrum Naudin (1852); Staphidium Naudin (1852); Stephanotrichum Naudin (1845); Synodon Raf. (1838); Synoptera Raf. (1838); Terera Naudin (1851 publ. 1850), not validly publ.; Tetrazygia Rich. ex DC. (1828); Tetrazygiopsis Borhidi (1977); Tetrazygos Rich. ex DC. (1828); Tococa Aubl. (1775); Trigynia Jacq.-Fél. (1936); Truncaria DC. (1828); Tschudya DC. (1828); Ziegera Raf. (1838)

= Miconia =

Genus of flowering plants

Miconia is a genus of flowering plants in the glory bush family, Melastomataceae, native to warm temperate to tropical regions of the Americas. The species are mostly shrubs and small to medium-sized trees up to 15 m (49 ft) tall. The generic name honours Catalan physician and botanist Francesc Micó. Some species are known by the common name johnnyberry.

Many species are threatened by habitat destruction in their native range, and some are feared to be on the brink of extinction. On the other hand, M. calvescens is a contributing factor in the decline and maybe even extinction of other plants: it has become a highly invasive weed on a number of Pacific Islands where it was introduced, including Hawaii and Tahiti. It is often referred to as the "purple plague" or the "green cancer" in reference to its habit of overgrowing native ecosystems, and its leaves which are bright green above and bright purple below.

Miconia fruit are a favorite food of many birds (invasive M. calvescens spreads by this route). The leaves of some species are eaten by caterpillars of the moth-butterflies (Hedylidae).

== Species ==
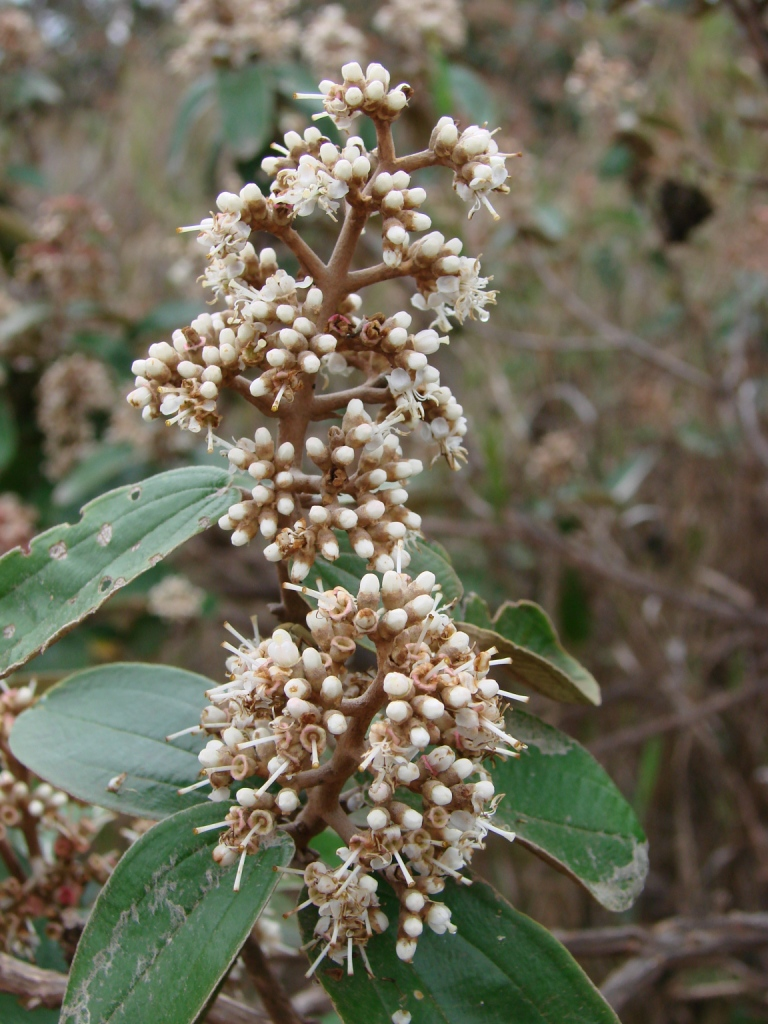
Miconia albicans

As of 2023, genus Miconia comprises nearly 1,900 species, with new species occasionally being discovered. Among them are:

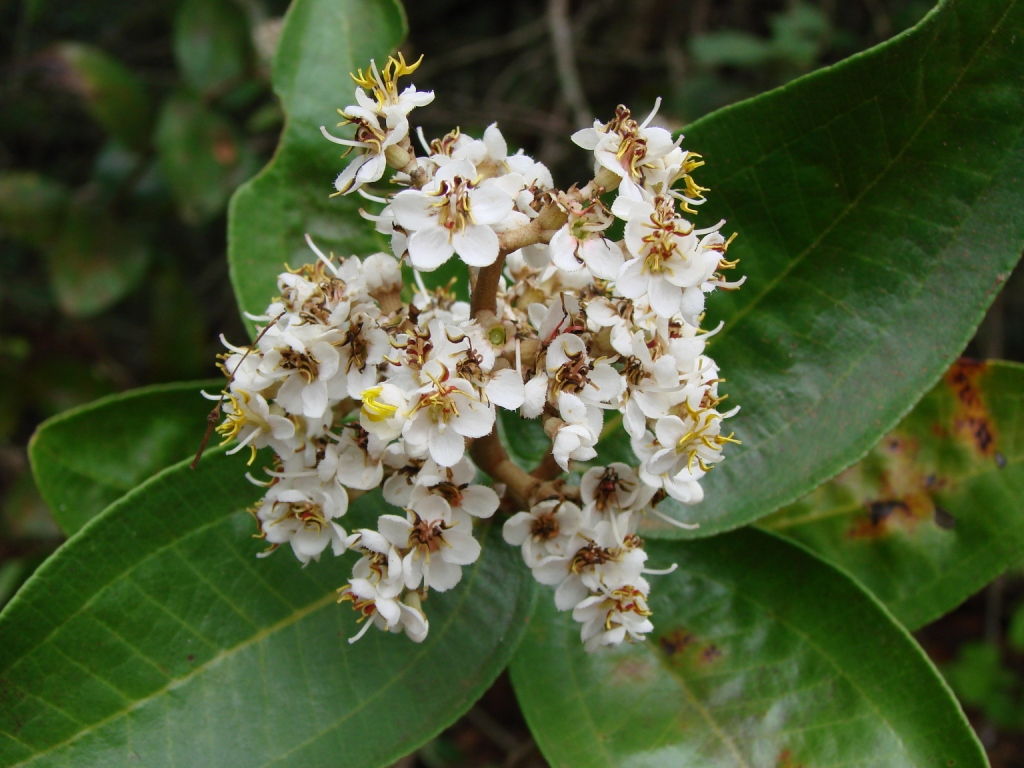
Miconia fallax

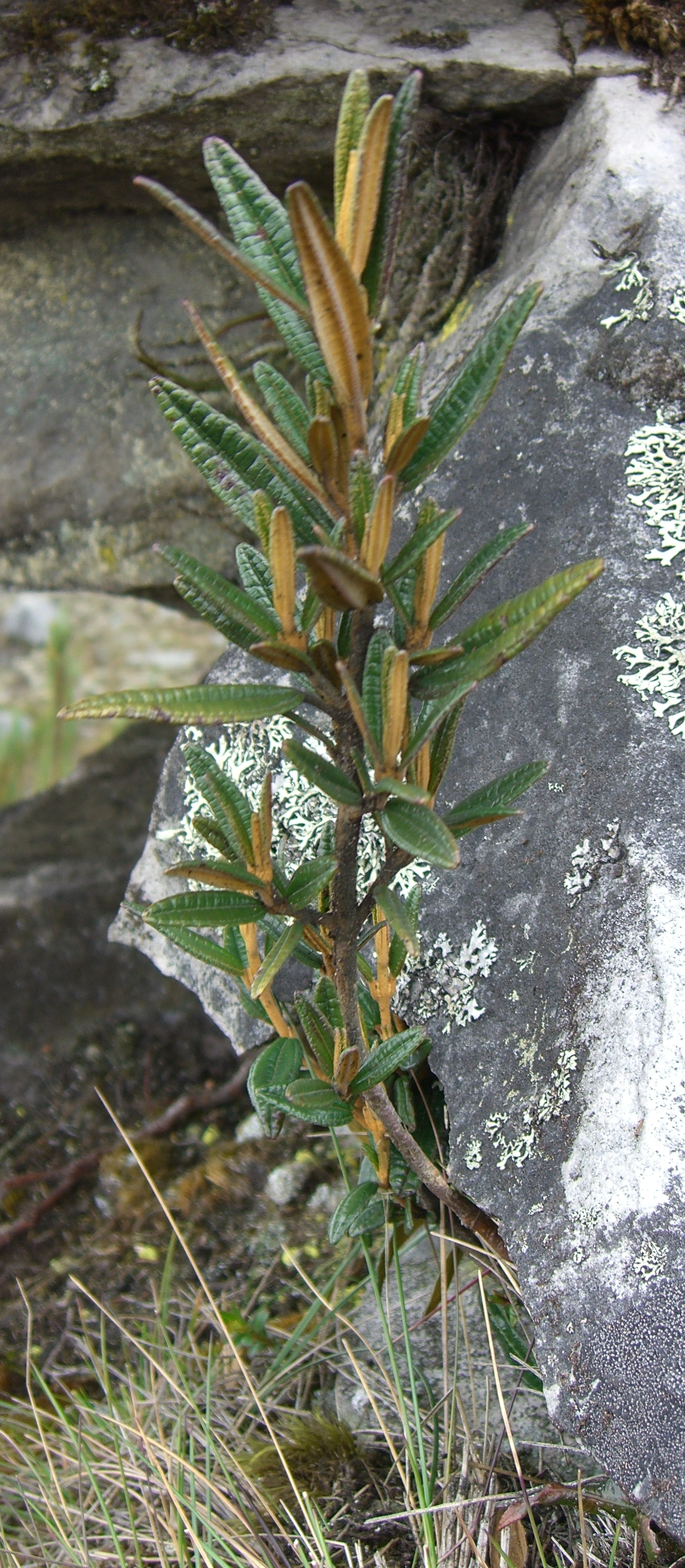
Miconia salicifolia

- Miconia abbreviata
- Miconia acuminata
- Miconia acutifolia
- Miconia aequatorialis
- Miconia albicans
- Miconia aligera
- Miconia alpina
- Miconia altissima
- Miconia argyrea
- Miconia ascendens
- Miconia asplundii
- Miconia aspratilis
- Miconia augustii
- Miconia ayacuchensis
- Miconia bailloniana
- Miconia barbipilis
- Miconia barclayana
- Miconia beneolens
- Miconia benoistii
- Miconia bicolor
- Miconia bipatrialis
- Miconia bolivarensis
- Miconia bracteolata
- Miconia brasiliensis
- Miconia brevistylis
- Miconia brevitheca
- Miconia brunnea
- Miconia budlejoides
- Miconia caelata
- Miconia caesariata
- Miconia cabucu
- Miconia cajanumana
- Miconia calignosa
- Miconia calophylla
- Miconia calvescens
- Miconia campii
- Miconia candolleana
- Miconia capitellata
- Miconia castillensis
- Miconia castrensis
- Miconia cava
- Miconia centrosperma
- Miconia ceramicarpa
- Miconia cercophora
- Miconia chamissois
- Miconia chartacea
- Miconia ciliata
- Miconia cinerascens
- Miconia cinnamomifolia
- Miconia collayensis
- Miconia conformis
- Miconia corazonica
- Miconia cosangensis
- Miconia crebribullata
- Miconia crenata
- Miconia cuprea
- Miconia cutucuensis
- Miconia dapsiliflora
- Miconia demissifolia
- Miconia depauperata
- Miconia dichroa
- Miconia dielsii
- Miconia dissimulans
- Miconia divaricata
- Miconia dodsonii
- Miconia doriana
- Miconia elegantissima
- Miconia espinosae
- Miconia explicita
- Miconia fallax
- Miconia fasciculata
- Miconia floccosa
- Miconia florbella
- Miconia formosa
- Miconia fosbergii
- Miconia fuliginosa
- Miconia gibba
- Miconia gigantophylla
- Miconia gilva
- Miconia glandulistyla
- Miconia glazioviana
- Miconia glyptophylla
- Miconia gonioclada
- Miconia grayana
- Miconia griffisii
- Miconia guayaquilensis
- Miconia hexamera
- Miconia hirsutivena
- Miconia holosericea
- Miconia huigrensis
- Miconia hylophila
- Miconia idiogena
- Miconia imitans
- Miconia inanis
- Miconia innata
- Miconia jorgensenii
- Miconia jucunda
- Miconia lacera
- Miconia lachnoclada
- Miconia langsdorffii
- Miconia latecrenata
- Miconia laxa
- Miconia leandroides
- Miconia ledifolia
- Miconia ligustroides
- Miconia littlei
- Miconia longicuspis
- Miconia longidentata
- Miconia longisetosa
- Miconia lugonis
- Miconia macbrydeana
- Miconia macrothyrsa
- Miconia mediocris
- Miconia medusa
- Miconia minutiflora
- Miconia mirabilis
- Miconia molesta
- Miconia namandensis
- Miconia nasella
- Miconia nervosa
- Miconia nubicola
- Miconia ochroleuca
- Miconia octopetala
- Miconia oellgaardii
- Miconia oligantha
- Miconia ombrophila
- Miconia onaensis
- Miconia organensis
- Miconia ovalifolia
- Miconia pailasana
- Miconia paniculata
- Miconia papillosa
- Miconia pastazana
- Miconia paulensis
- Miconia pausana
- Miconia penduliflora
- Miconia penningtonii
- Miconia pepericarpa
- Miconia perelegans
- Miconia pernettifolia
- Miconia phaeochaeta
- Miconia pilaloensis
- Miconia pisinniflora
- Miconia poecilantha
- Miconia pohliana
- Miconia poortmannii
- Miconia prasina
- Miconia prietoi
- Miconia proctorii
- Miconia prominens
- Miconia protuberans
- Miconia pseudo-eichlerii
- Miconia pseudopedicellata
- Miconia pseudorigida
- Miconia pusilliflora
- Miconia rabenii
- Miconia reburrosa
- Miconia renneri
- Miconia rheophytica
- Miconia rimbachii
- Miconia rivetii
- Miconia rubiginosa
- Miconia salicifolia
- Miconia santaritensis
- Miconia scabra
- Miconia scutata
- Miconia saldanhaei
- Miconia secunpastazana
- Miconia sellowiana
- Miconia semicrenata
- Miconia serrulata
- Miconia seticaulis
- Miconia setulosa
- Miconia silicicola
- Miconia sintenisii
- Miconia sodiroi
- Miconia sparrei
- Miconia staminea
- Miconia stenophylla
- Miconia stenostachya
- Miconia suborbicularis
- Miconia subseriata
- Miconia subvernicosa
- Miconia superba
- Miconia tephrodes
- Miconia theaezans
- Miconia tococa
- Miconia tomentosa
- Miconia tristis
- Miconia urophylla
- Miconia valenzuelana
- Miconia vesca
- Miconia villonacensis
- Miconia willdenowii
- Miconia zamorensis
