= Miconia setulosa =

Conservation status
- Vulnerable (IUCN 2.3)

Scientific classification
- Kingdom: Plantae
- Clade: Tracheophytes
- Clade: Angiosperms
- Clade: Eudicots
- Clade: Rosids
- Order: Myrtales
- Family: Melastomataceae
- Genus: Miconia
- Species: M. setulosa

Binomial name
- Miconia setulosa Cogn.

Synonyms
- Acinodendron setulosum (Cogn.) Kuntze

Species of plant

Miconia setulosa is a species of plant in the family Melastomataceae. It is endemic to Peru and Bolivia.
