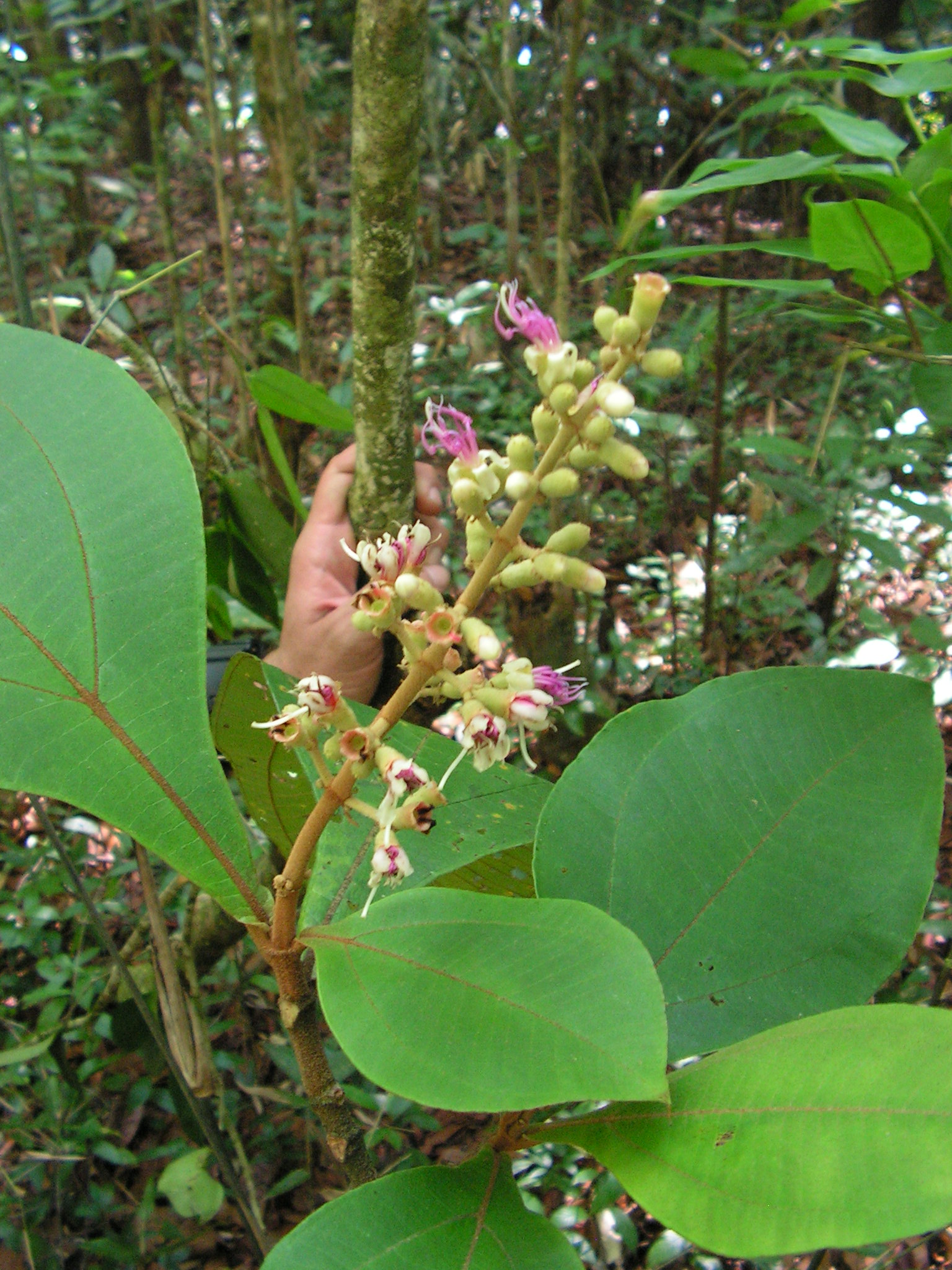
- Leaves and inflorescence

Conservation status
- Least Concern (IUCN 2.3)

Scientific classification
- Kingdom: Plantae
- Clade: Tracheophytes
- Clade: Angiosperms
- Clade: Eudicots
- Clade: Rosids
- Order: Myrtales
- Family: Melastomataceae
- Genus: Miconia
- Species: M. tomentosa

Binomial name
- Miconia tomentosa (Rich.) D. Don ex DC.

= Miconia tomentosa =

Species of plant

Miconia tomentosa is a species of shrub or treelet in the family Melastomataceae. It is native to South America.
