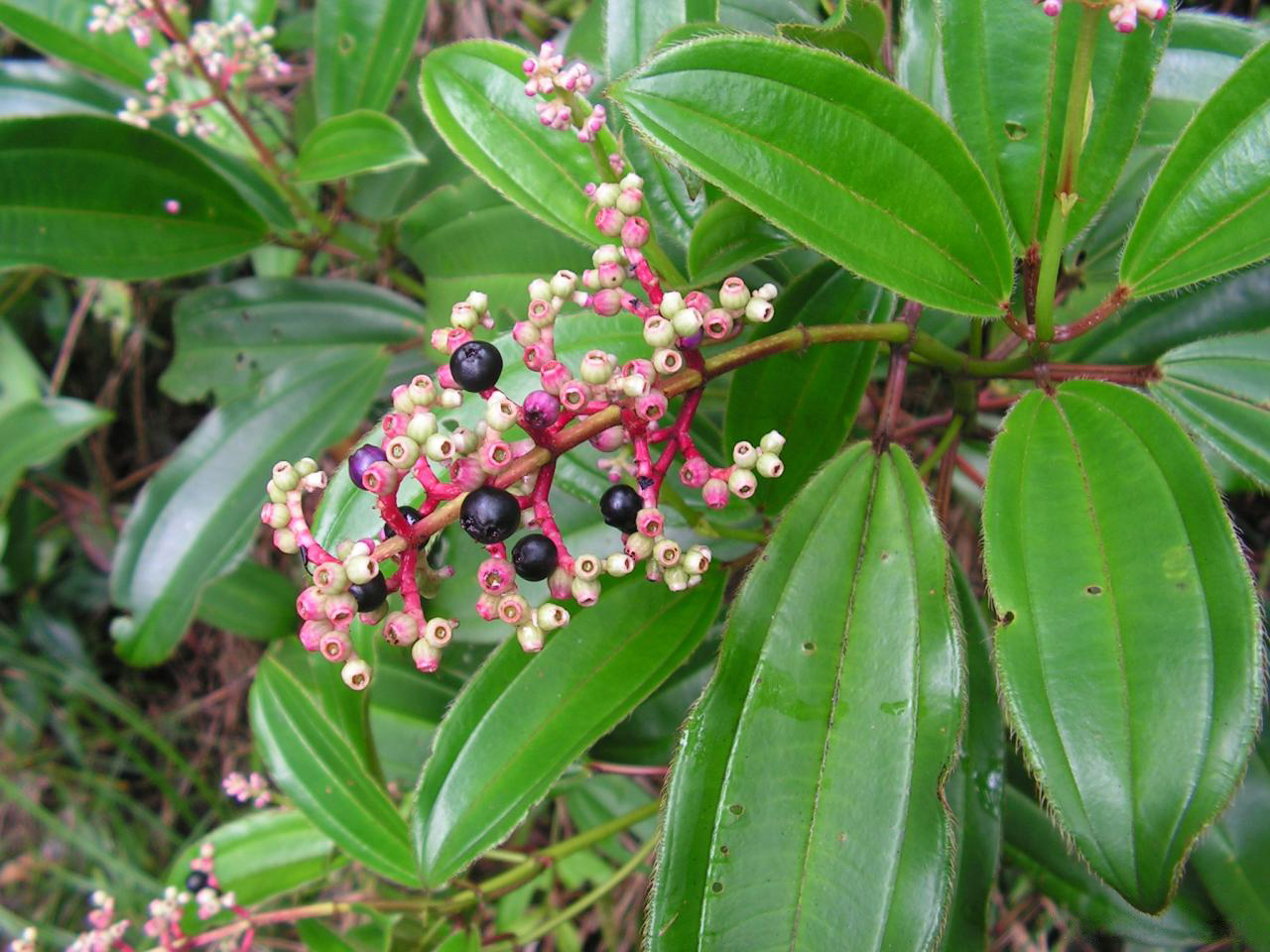
- Leaves and fruits

Scientific classification
- Kingdom: Plantae
- Clade: Tracheophytes
- Clade: Angiosperms
- Clade: Eudicots
- Clade: Rosids
- Order: Myrtales
- Family: Melastomataceae
- Genus: Miconia
- Species: M. ciliata

Binomial name
- Miconia ciliata (Rich.) DC.

= Miconia ciliata =

Species of plant

Miconia ciliata is a species of shrub in the family Melastomataceae. It is native to North and South America.
