= Miconia gibba =

Conservation status
- Least Concern (IUCN 3.1)

Scientific classification
- Kingdom: Plantae
- Clade: Tracheophytes
- Clade: Angiosperms
- Clade: Eudicots
- Clade: Rosids
- Order: Myrtales
- Family: Melastomataceae
- Genus: Miconia
- Species: M. gibba

Binomial name
- Miconia gibba Markgr.

Species of flowering plant

Miconia gibba is a species of flowering plant in the family Melastomataceae. It is native to Colombia and Ecuador. Its natural habitat is subtropical or tropical moist montane forests.
