= Miconia proctorii =

Conservation status
- Endangered (IUCN 2.3)

Scientific classification
- Kingdom: Plantae
- Clade: Tracheophytes
- Clade: Angiosperms
- Clade: Eudicots
- Clade: Rosids
- Order: Myrtales
- Family: Melastomataceae
- Genus: Miconia
- Species: M. proctorii

Binomial name
- Miconia proctorii Judd (2018)

Synonyms
- Chitonia albicans D.Don ex Naudin (1851); Tetrazygia albicans (D.Don ex Naudin) Triana (1871 publ. 1872)

Species of flowering plant

Miconia proctorii is a species of plant in the family Melastomataceae. It is endemic to Jamaica. It is threatened by habitat loss.
