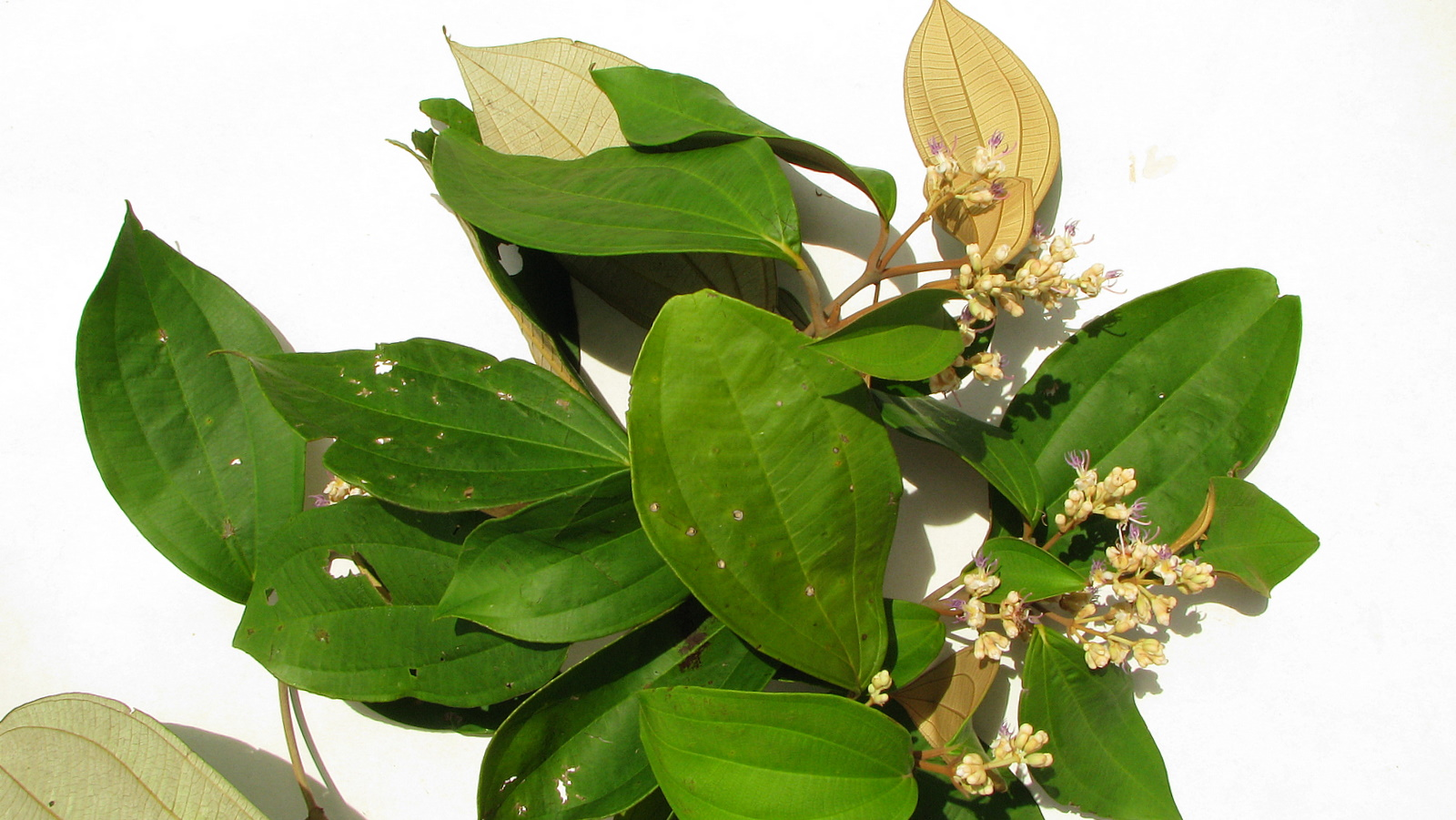
- Leaves and inflorescences

Scientific classification
- Kingdom: Plantae
- Clade: Tracheophytes
- Clade: Angiosperms
- Clade: Eudicots
- Clade: Rosids
- Order: Myrtales
- Family: Melastomataceae
- Genus: Miconia
- Species: M. holosericea

Binomial name
- Miconia holosericea (L.) DC.

= Miconia holosericea =

Species of tree

Miconia holosericea is a species of shrub or tree in the family Melastomataceae. It is native to North and South America.
