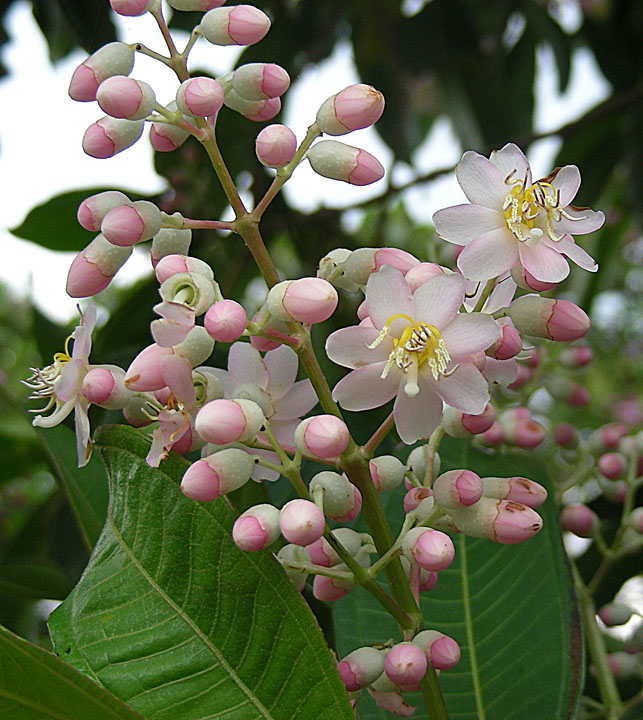
- Leaves and inflorescence

Scientific classification
- Kingdom: Plantae
- Clade: Tracheophytes
- Clade: Angiosperms
- Clade: Eudicots
- Clade: Rosids
- Order: Myrtales
- Family: Melastomataceae
- Genus: Miconia
- Species: M. theizans

Binomial name
- Miconia theizans (Bonpl.) Cogn.

= Miconia theizans =

Species of tree

Miconia theizans (synonym Miconia theaezans) is a species of shrub or tree in the family Melastomataceae.

== Distribution ==
It is native to South America.
