= Miconia aspratilis =

Conservation status
- Endangered (IUCN 3.1)

Scientific classification
- Kingdom: Plantae
- Clade: Tracheophytes
- Clade: Angiosperms
- Clade: Eudicots
- Clade: Rosids
- Order: Myrtales
- Family: Melastomataceae
- Genus: Miconia
- Species: M. aspratilis

Binomial name
- Miconia aspratilis Wurdack

Species of flowering plant

Miconia aspratilis is a species of plant in the family Melastomataceae. It is endemic to Ecuador. Its natural habitats are subtropical or tropical moist montane forests and subtropical or tropical high-altitude grassland.
