= Miconia abbreviata =

Conservation status
- Near Threatened (IUCN 2.3)

Scientific classification
- Kingdom: Plantae
- Clade: Tracheophytes
- Clade: Angiosperms
- Clade: Eudicots
- Clade: Rosids
- Order: Myrtales
- Family: Melastomataceae
- Genus: Miconia
- Species: M. abbreviata

Binomial name
- Miconia abbreviata Markgr.

Species of plant

Miconia abbreviata is a species of flowering plant in the family Melastomataceae. It is native to Bolivia, Northern Brazil, Colombia, Ecuador, Peru, and Venezuela.
