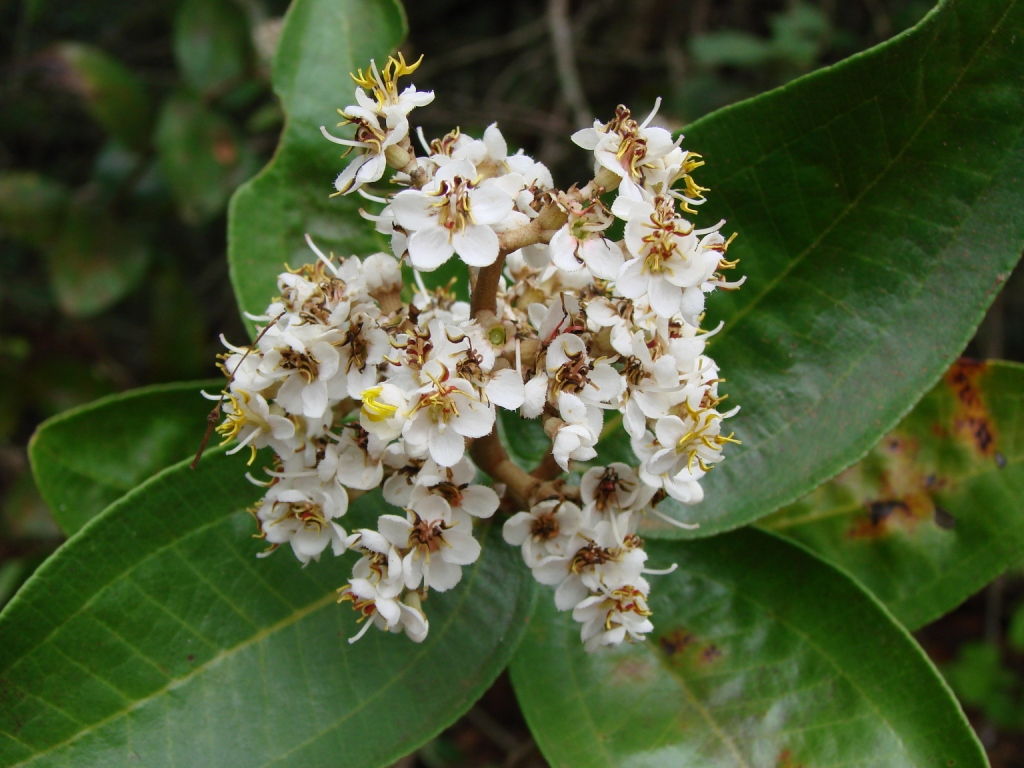
- Leaves and inflorescence

Scientific classification
- Kingdom: Plantae
- Clade: Embryophytes
- Clade: Tracheophytes
- Clade: Angiosperms
- Clade: Eudicots
- Clade: Rosids
- Order: Myrtales
- Family: Melastomataceae
- Genus: Miconia
- Species: M. fallax

Binomial name
- Miconia fallax DC.

= Miconia fallax =

Species of plant

Miconia fallax is a species of shrub in the family Melastomataceae. It is native to South America.
