= Miconia elegantissima =

Conservation status
- Vulnerable (IUCN 2.3)

Scientific classification
- Kingdom: Plantae
- Clade: Tracheophytes
- Clade: Angiosperms
- Clade: Eudicots
- Clade: Rosids
- Order: Myrtales
- Family: Melastomataceae
- Genus: Miconia
- Species: M. elegantissima

Binomial name
- Miconia elegantissima Bécquer & Judd (2018)

Synonyms
- Tetrazygia elegans Urb. (1923)

Species of flowering plant

Miconia elegantissima is a species of plant in the family Melastomataceae. It is endemic to Cuba.
