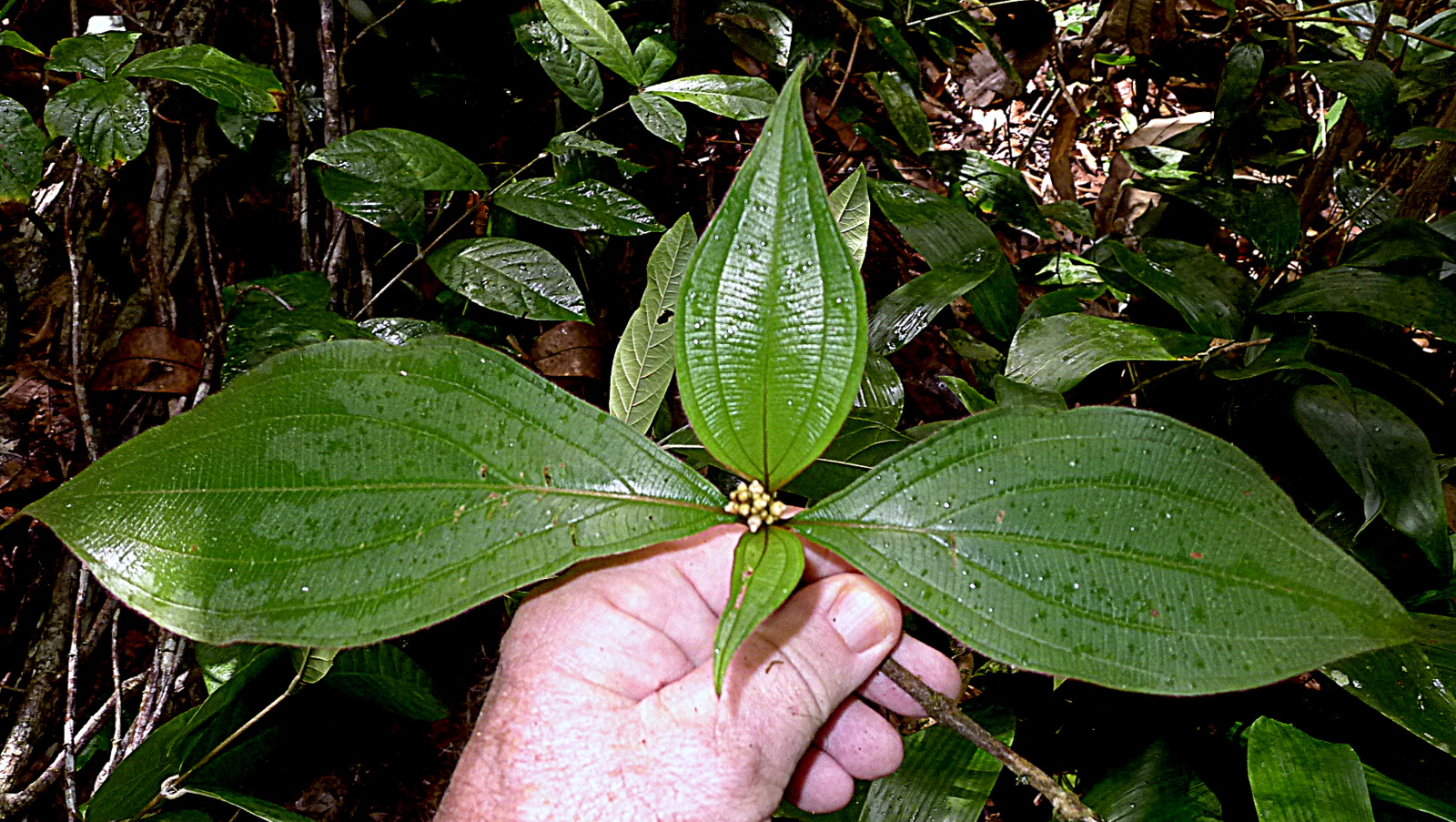

Scientific classification
- Kingdom: Plantae
- Clade: Tracheophytes
- Clade: Angiosperms
- Clade: Eudicots
- Clade: Rosids
- Order: Myrtales
- Family: Melastomataceae
- Genus: Miconia
- Species: M. nervosa

Binomial name
- Miconia nervosa (Smith) Triana

= Miconia nervosa =

Species of shrub

Miconia nervosa is a species of shrub in the family Melastomataceae. It is native to North and South America.
