= Miconia secunpastazana =

Conservation status
- Vulnerable (IUCN 3.1)

Scientific classification
- Kingdom: Plantae
- Clade: Tracheophytes
- Clade: Angiosperms
- Clade: Eudicots
- Clade: Rosids
- Order: Myrtales
- Family: Melastomataceae
- Genus: Miconia
- Species: M. secunpastazana

Binomial name
- Miconia secunpastazana Ocampo & Almeda (2018)

Synonyms
- Leandra pastazana Wurdack (1979)

Species of flowering plant

Miconia secunpastazana is a species of plant in the family Melastomataceae. It is endemic to Ecuador. Its natural habitats are subtropical or tropical moist lowland forests and subtropical or tropical moist montane forests.
