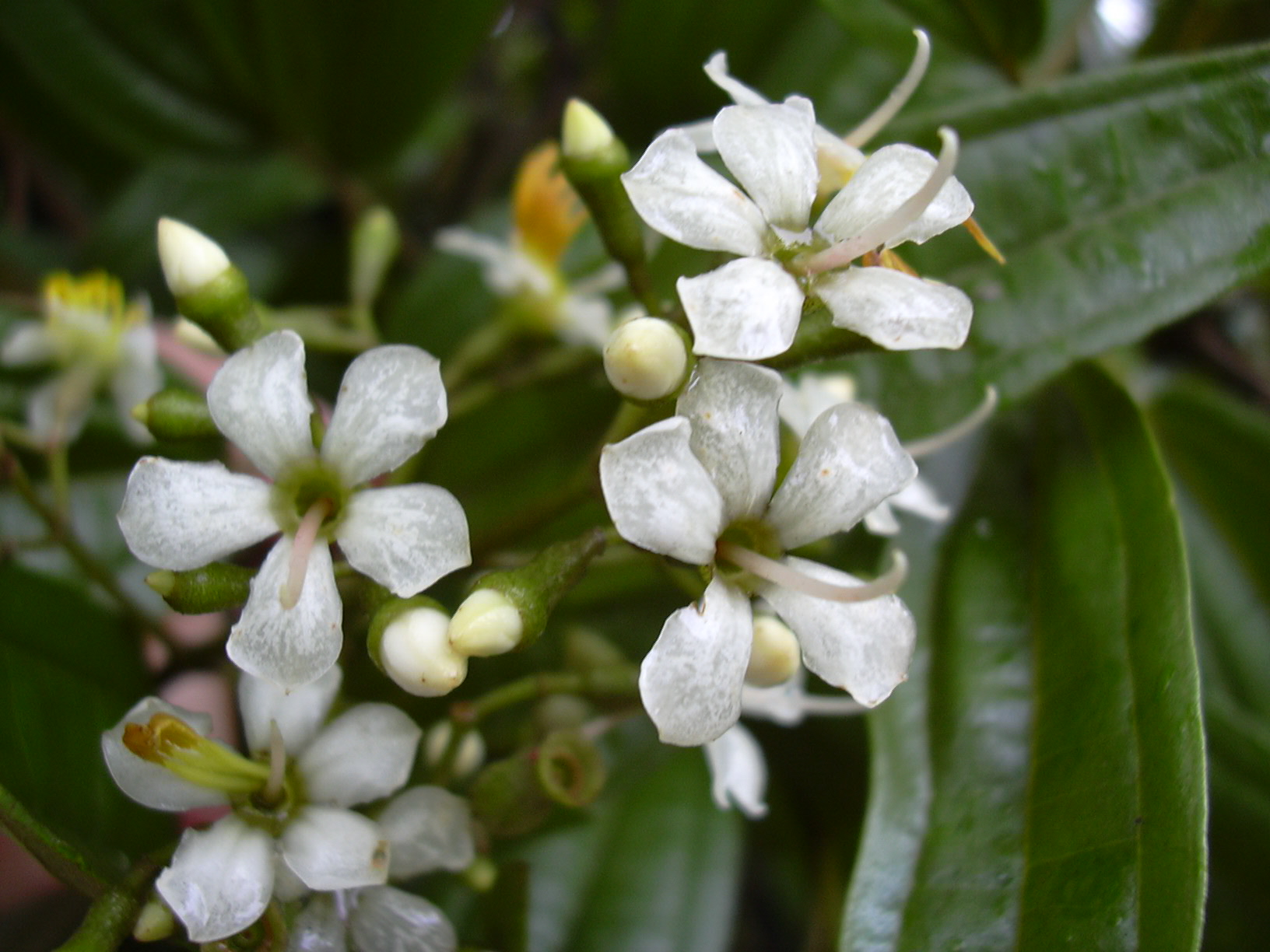

Conservation status
- Least Concern (IUCN 3.1)

Scientific classification
- Kingdom: Plantae
- Clade: Embryophytes
- Clade: Tracheophytes
- Clade: Spermatophytes
- Clade: Angiosperms
- Clade: Eudicots
- Clade: Rosids
- Order: Myrtales
- Family: Melastomataceae
- Genus: Miconia
- Species: M. bicolor

Binomial name
- Miconia bicolor (Mill.) Triana (1871 publ. 1872)

Varieties
- Miconia bicolor var. bicolor; Miconia bicolor var. patentisetosa (Borhidi) Judd, Bécquer & Majure

Synonyms
- Melastoma bicolor Mill. (1768); Tetrazygia bicolor (Mill.) Cogn. (1891)

= Miconia bicolor =

Species of flowering plant

Miconia bicolor is a species of flowering plant in the glory bush family, Melastomataceae, that is native to southern Florida in the United States and the Caribbean. Common names include Florida clover ash, Florida tetrazygia, and West Indian lilac.

== Description ==
Miconia bicolor is a shrub that reaches a height of 3 to 9 m (9.8 to 29.5 ft). The shrub is multi-trunked, the stems' colour can be green or reddish. Its evergreen lanceolate leaves are 10 to 20 cm (3.9 to 7.9 in) long and have three parallel conspicuous veins which run lengthwise. The plant flowers during the spring and summer. The flowers are white or pinkish and the oval fruit is brown and attracts birds.

The shrub grows in the subtropical wetlands of Everglades. It prefers partial shade and grows in acidic, alkaline, sand, loam and clay soils. It has a high drought tolerance but will also grow on well-drained soils.

== Popular culture ==
In the novel Jurassic Park (1990) by Michael Crichton and subsequent film adaptation (1993) Dr. Ellie Sattler, in an attempt to diagnose a sick dinosaur, discovers West Indian lilac in the triceratops paddock. Dr. Sattler suspects the toxicity of the plant is the root cause of the dinosaur's illness. After inspecting the dinosaur's droppings Dr. Sattler determines the animal is not grazing on the West Indian lilac. This mystery is only resolved in the book which later explains that the berries are being accidentally ingested together with gizzard stones and later regurgitated.
