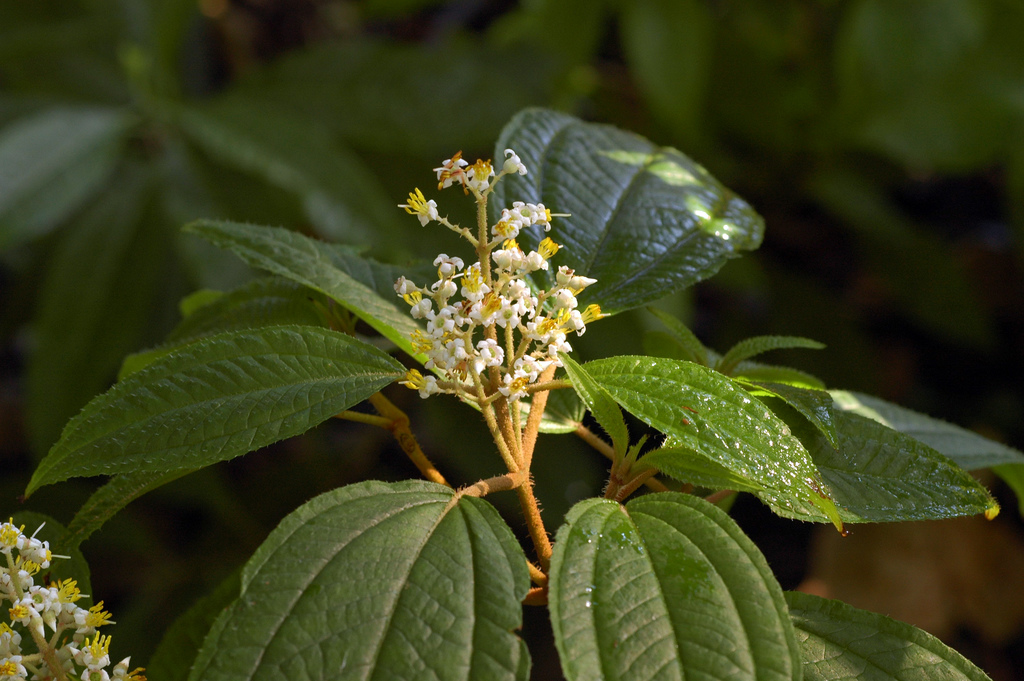

Scientific classification
- Kingdom: Plantae
- Clade: Tracheophytes
- Clade: Angiosperms
- Clade: Eudicots
- Clade: Rosids
- Order: Myrtales
- Family: Melastomataceae
- Genus: Miconia
- Species: M. subseriata

Binomial name
- Miconia subseriata (Naudin) R.Goldenb. & Michelang. (2018)

Synonyms
- Clidemia amblyandra Naudin (1852); Clidemia subseriata Naudin (1852); Leandra mucida Markgr. (1934); Leandra subseriata (Naudin) Cogn. (1886); Oxymeris subseriata (Naudin) Triana (1871 publ. 1872)

= Miconia subseriata =

Species of flowering plant

Miconia subseriata is a species of plant in the family Melastomataceae. It is a shrub or tree which ranges from Oaxaca and Chiapas in southern Mexico through Central America to Colombia, Ecuador, and northwestern Venezuela.
