= Miconia alpina =

Conservation status
- Vulnerable (IUCN 2.3)

Scientific classification
- Kingdom: Plantae
- Clade: Tracheophytes
- Clade: Angiosperms
- Clade: Eudicots
- Clade: Rosids
- Order: Myrtales
- Family: Melastomataceae
- Genus: Miconia
- Species: M. alpina

Binomial name
- Miconia alpina Cogn.

Species of plant

Miconia alpina is a species of tree in the family Melastomataceae. It is endemic to Peru and considered a vulnerable species by the IUCN.
