= Miconia nubicola =

Conservation status
- Endangered (IUCN 2.3)

Scientific classification
- Kingdom: Plantae
- Clade: Tracheophytes
- Clade: Angiosperms
- Clade: Eudicots
- Clade: Rosids
- Order: Myrtales
- Family: Melastomataceae
- Genus: Miconia
- Species: M. nubicola

Binomial name
- Miconia nubicola Proctor

Species of flowering plant

Miconia nubicola is a species of plant in the family Melastomataceae. It is endemic to Jamaica.
