= Miconia guayaquilensis =

Conservation status
- Endangered (IUCN 3.1)

Scientific classification
- Kingdom: Plantae
- Clade: Tracheophytes
- Clade: Angiosperms
- Clade: Eudicots
- Clade: Rosids
- Order: Myrtales
- Family: Melastomataceae
- Genus: Miconia
- Species: M. guayaquilensis

Binomial name
- Miconia guayaquilensis (Bonpl.) D.Don ex DC.

Species of flowering plant

Miconia guayaquilensis is a species of plant in the family Melastomataceae. It is endemic to Ecuador. Its natural habitats are subtropical or tropical dry forests and subtropical or tropical moist lowland forests.
