= Miconia perelegans =

Conservation status
- Vulnerable (IUCN 2.3)

Scientific classification
- Kingdom: Plantae
- Clade: Tracheophytes
- Clade: Angiosperms
- Clade: Eudicots
- Clade: Rosids
- Order: Myrtales
- Family: Melastomataceae
- Genus: Miconia
- Species: M. perelegans

Binomial name
- Miconia perelegans Urban

Species of flowering plant

Miconia perelegans is a species of plant in the family Melastomataceae. It is endemic to Cuba.
