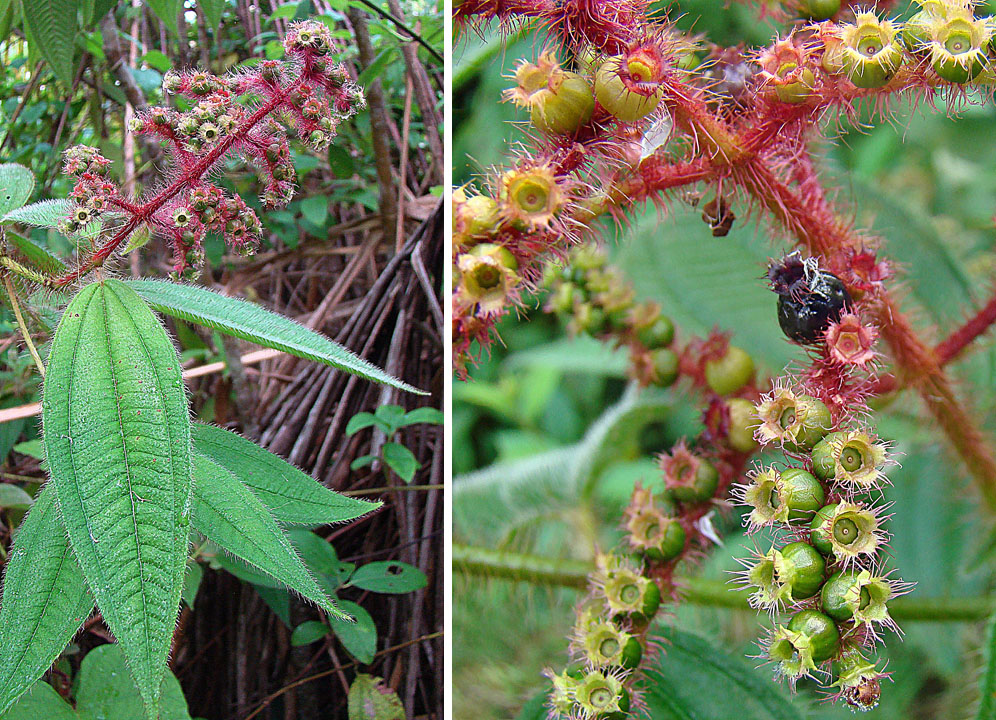

Scientific classification
- Kingdom: Plantae
- Clade: Tracheophytes
- Clade: Angiosperms
- Clade: Eudicots
- Clade: Rosids
- Order: Myrtales
- Family: Melastomataceae
- Genus: Miconia
- Species: M. lacera

Binomial name
- Miconia lacera (Bonpl.) Naudin

= Miconia lacera =

Species of plant

Miconia lacera is a species of shrub in the family Melastomataceae. It is native to North and South America.
