= Miconia benoistii =

Conservation status
- Critically Endangered (IUCN 3.1)

Scientific classification
- Kingdom: Plantae
- Clade: Tracheophytes
- Clade: Angiosperms
- Clade: Eudicots
- Clade: Rosids
- Order: Myrtales
- Family: Melastomataceae
- Genus: Miconia
- Species: M. benoistii

Binomial name
- Miconia benoistii Wurdack

Species of flowering plant

Miconia benoistii is a species of plant in the family Melastomataceae. It is endemic to Ecuador.
