= Miconia pseudorigida =

Conservation status
- Critically Endangered (IUCN 3.1)

Scientific classification
- Kingdom: Plantae
- Clade: Tracheophytes
- Clade: Angiosperms
- Clade: Eudicots
- Clade: Rosids
- Order: Myrtales
- Family: Melastomataceae
- Genus: Miconia
- Species: M. pseudorigida

Binomial name
- Miconia pseudorigida Proctor

Species of flowering plant

Miconia pseudorigida is a species of plant in the family Melastomataceae. It is endemic to Jamaica. It is threatened by habitat loss.
