= Miconia gigantophylla =

Scientific classification
- Kingdom: Plantae
- Clade: Tracheophytes
- Clade: Angiosperms
- Clade: Eudicots
- Clade: Rosids
- Order: Myrtales
- Family: Melastomataceae
- Genus: Miconia; Britton
- Species: M. gigantophylla

Binomial name
- Miconia gigantophylla (Britton) Michelang. (2018)

Synonyms
- Necramium gigantophyllum Britton (1924)

Genus of flowering plants

Micronia gigantophylla is a species of flowering plant belonging to the family Melastomataceae. Its native range is Trinidad to Venezuela.
