= Miconia cercophora =

Conservation status
- Near Threatened (IUCN 3.1)

Scientific classification
- Kingdom: Plantae
- Clade: Tracheophytes
- Clade: Angiosperms
- Clade: Eudicots
- Clade: Rosids
- Order: Myrtales
- Family: Melastomataceae
- Genus: Miconia
- Species: M. cercophora

Binomial name
- Miconia cercophora Wurdack

Species of flowering plant

Miconia cercophora is a species of plant in the family Melastomataceae, endemic to Ecuador. Its natural habitat is subtropical or tropical moist lowland forests and subtropical or tropical moist montane forests.
