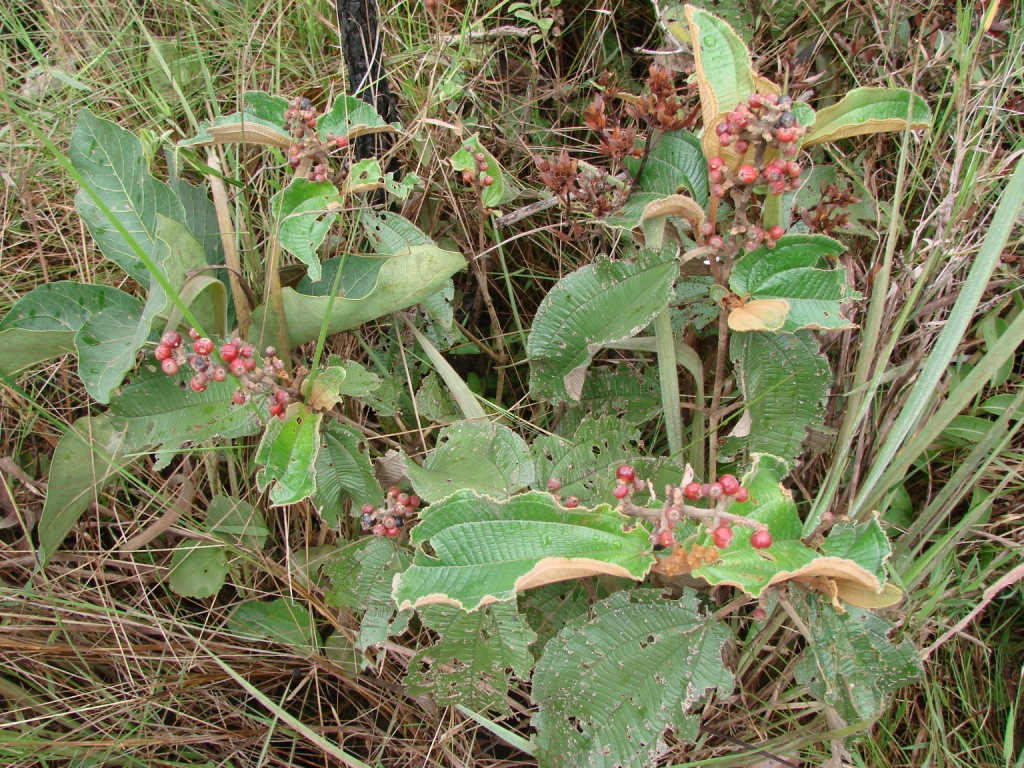
- Leaves and fruits

Scientific classification
- Kingdom: Plantae
- Clade: Tracheophytes
- Clade: Angiosperms
- Clade: Eudicots
- Clade: Rosids
- Order: Myrtales
- Family: Melastomataceae
- Genus: Miconia
- Species: M. macrothyrsa

Binomial name
- Miconia macrothyrsa Benth.

= Miconia macrothyrsa =

Species of plant

Miconia macrothyrsa is a species of shrub in the family Melastomataceae. It is native to South America.
