= Miconia ledifolia =

Conservation status
- Endangered (IUCN 3.1)

Scientific classification
- Kingdom: Plantae
- Clade: Tracheophytes
- Clade: Angiosperms
- Clade: Eudicots
- Clade: Rosids
- Order: Myrtales
- Family: Melastomataceae
- Genus: Miconia
- Species: M. ledifolia

Binomial name
- Miconia ledifolia (DC.) Naudin

Species of flowering plant

Miconia ledifolia is a species of plant in the family Melastomataceae. It is endemic to Ecuador. Its natural habitats are subtropical or tropical dry shrubland and subtropical or tropical high-altitude shrubland.
