= Miconia santaritensis =

Conservation status
- Vulnerable (IUCN 2.3)

Scientific classification
- Kingdom: Plantae
- Clade: Tracheophytes
- Clade: Angiosperms
- Clade: Eudicots
- Clade: Rosids
- Order: Myrtales
- Family: Melastomataceae
- Genus: Miconia
- Species: M. santaritensis

Binomial name
- Miconia santaritensis Almeda

Species of flowering plant

Miconia santaritensis is a species of plant in the family Melastomataceae. It is endemic to Panama. It is threatened by habitat loss.
