= Miconia jorgensenii =

Conservation status
- Vulnerable (IUCN 3.1)

Scientific classification
- Kingdom: Plantae
- Clade: Tracheophytes
- Clade: Angiosperms
- Clade: Eudicots
- Clade: Rosids
- Order: Myrtales
- Family: Melastomataceae
- Genus: Miconia
- Species: M. jorgensenii

Binomial name
- Miconia jorgensenii Wurdack

Species of flowering plant

Miconia jorgensenii is a species of plant in the family Melastomataceae. It is endemic to Ecuador. Its natural habitat is subtropical or tropical moist montane forests. It's found in Andean cloud forests, mostly at mid to high elevations and it has very limited geographic range.
