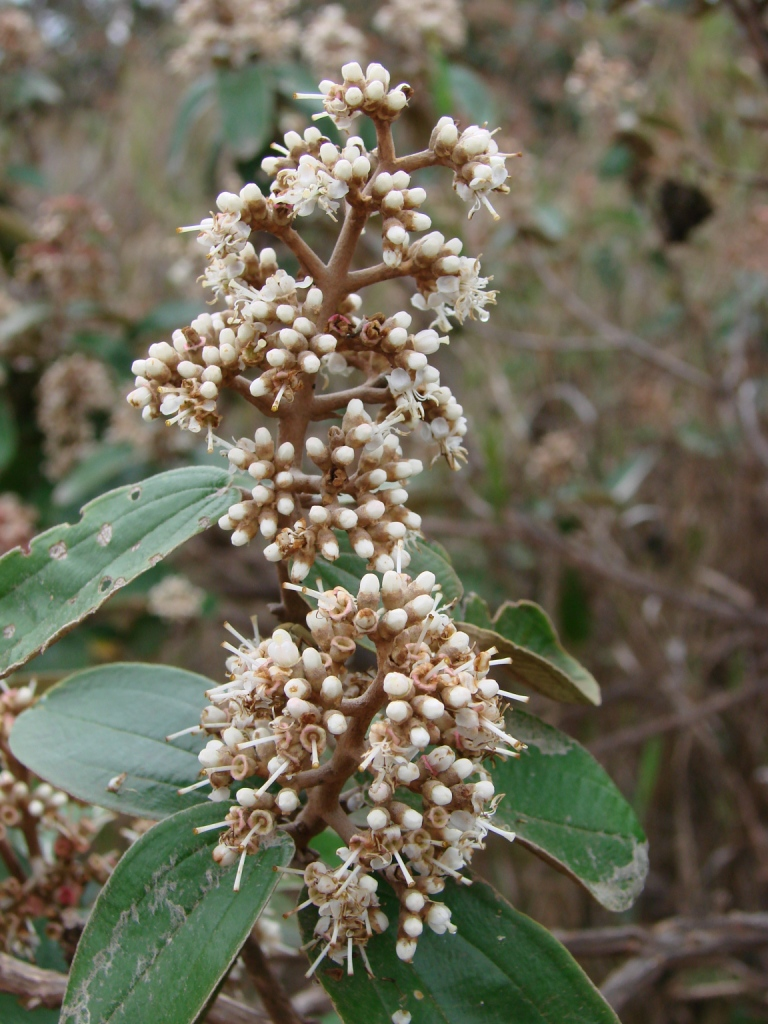
- Leaves and inflorescences.

Scientific classification
- Kingdom: Plantae
- Clade: Tracheophytes
- Clade: Angiosperms
- Clade: Eudicots
- Clade: Rosids
- Order: Myrtales
- Family: Melastomataceae
- Genus: Miconia
- Species: M. albicans

Binomial name
- Miconia albicans (Sw.) DC.

= Miconia albicans =

Species of plant

Miconia albicans is a species of shrub in the family Melastomataceae. It is known as canela-de-velho in Brazilian Portuguese. It is native to North and South America.
