= Miconia pseudopedicellata =

Conservation status
- Near Threatened (IUCN 2.3)

Scientific classification
- Kingdom: Plantae
- Clade: Tracheophytes
- Clade: Angiosperms
- Clade: Eudicots
- Clade: Rosids
- Order: Myrtales
- Family: Melastomataceae
- Genus: Miconia
- Species: M. pseudopedicellata

Binomial name
- Miconia pseudopedicellata Judd & Bécquer (2018)

Synonyms
- Pachyanthus pedicellatus Urb. (1926)

Species of plant

Miconia pseudopedicellata is a species of plant in the family Melastomataceae. It is endemic to Cuba. It is a thorny shrub with edible berries.
