= Tagetes microglossa =

Scientific classification
- Kingdom: Plantae
- Clade: Tracheophytes
- Clade: Angiosperms
- Clade: Eudicots
- Clade: Asterids
- Order: Asterales
- Family: Asteraceae
- Genus: Tagetes
- Species: T. microglossa

Binomial name
- Tagetes microglossa Benth. 1845

Synonyms
- Tagetes jaliscana Rydb.

Species of flowering plant

Tagetes microglossa is a Mesoamerican species of marigold in the family Asteraceae. It grows in Central America, Colombia, and Ecuador, as well as in central and southern Mexico, from Jalisco to Chiapas.

Tagetes microglossa is a hairless annual herb up to 30 cm (12 inches) tall. Leaves are pinnately compound with 7-11 leaflets. The plant produces a few flower heads are yellow, in a flat-topped array, each head containing 3-5 ray florets surrounding numerous disc florets.
