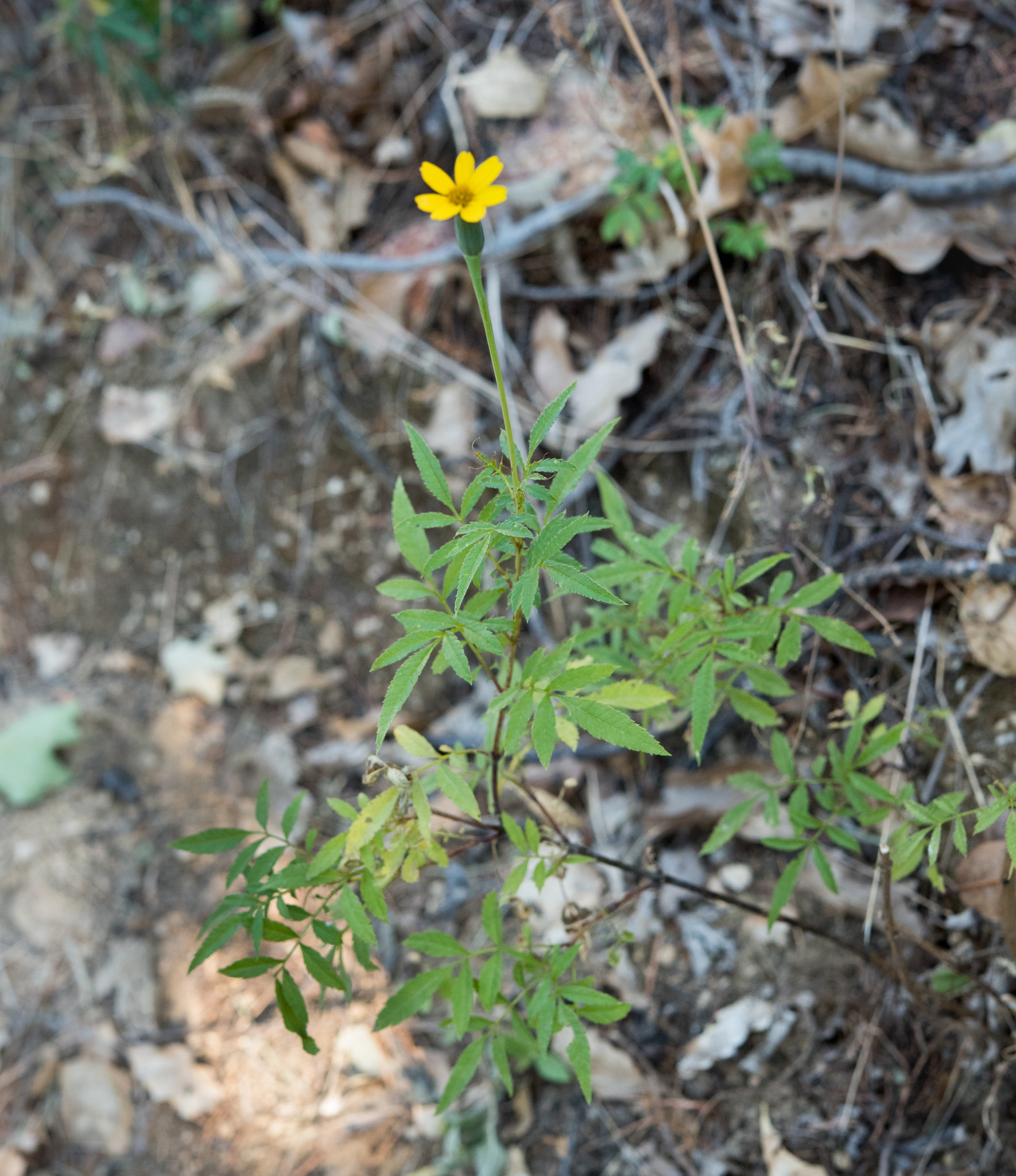

Scientific classification
- Kingdom: Plantae
- Clade: Tracheophytes
- Clade: Angiosperms
- Clade: Eudicots
- Clade: Asterids
- Order: Asterales
- Family: Asteraceae
- Genus: Tagetes
- Species: T. lacera

Binomial name
- Tagetes lacera Brandegee

= Tagetes lacera =

Species of flowering plant

Tagetes lacera is a Mexican species of marigolds in the family Asteraceae. It has been found only in the State of Baja California Sur in western Mexico.

Tagetes lacera is a hairless perennial herb growing up to 100 cm (40 inches) tall. The leaves are pinnately compound, up to 15 cm (6 inches) long including a large leaflet at the end, much larger than the side leaflets and about half the length of the leaf. The plant produces one yellow Flower head per branch.
