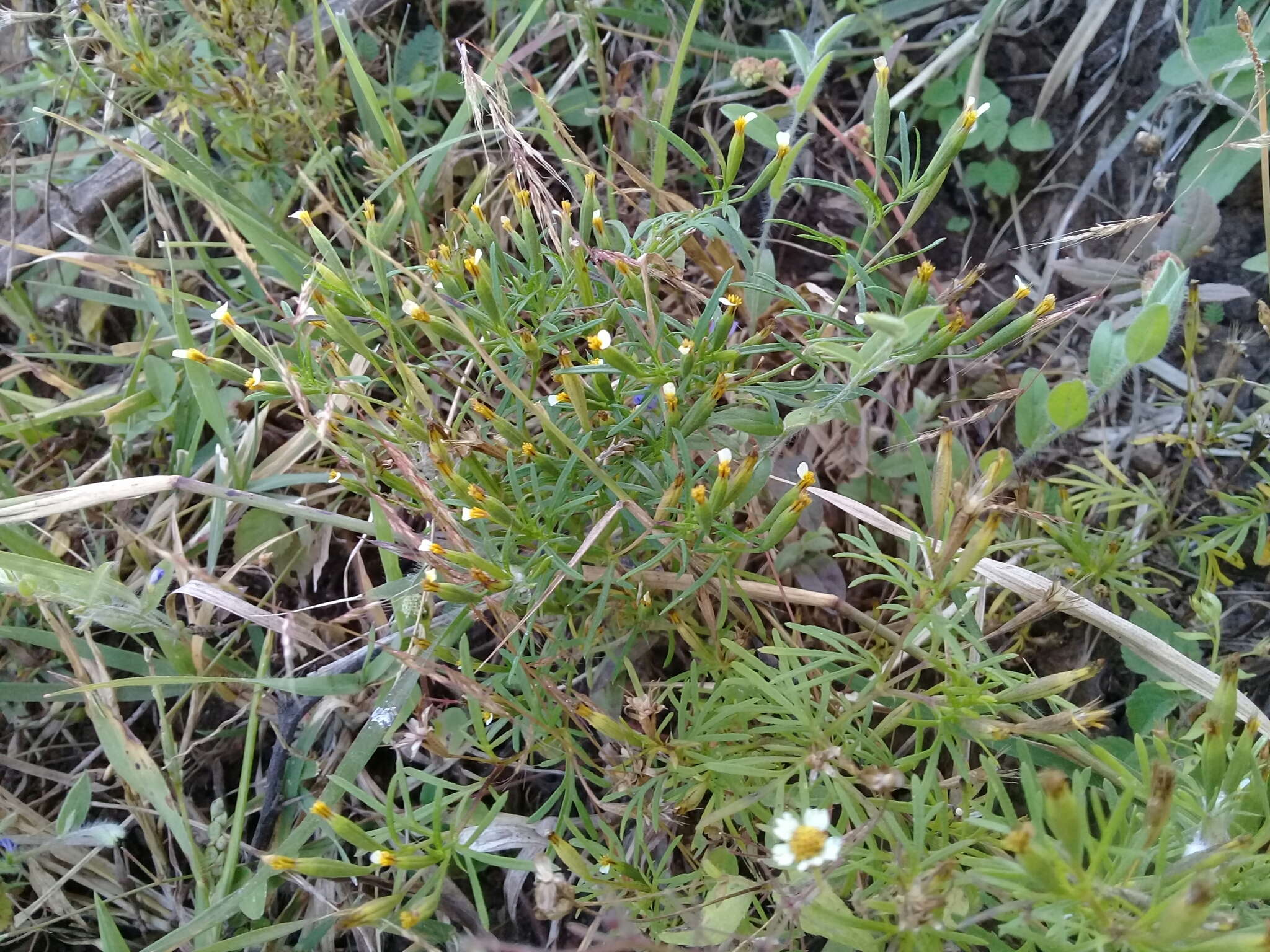

Scientific classification
- Kingdom: Plantae
- Clade: Tracheophytes
- Clade: Angiosperms
- Clade: Eudicots
- Clade: Asterids
- Order: Asterales
- Family: Asteraceae
- Genus: Tagetes
- Species: T. micrantha

Binomial name
- Tagetes micrantha Cav.

Synonyms
- Tagetes fragrantissima Sessé & Moc.

= Tagetes micrantha =

Species of flowering plant

Tagetes micrantha is a North American species of wild marigold within the family Asteraceae, common name licorice marigold. It is widespread across much of Mexico from Chihuahua to Oaxaca, and found also in the southwestern United States (Arizona, New Mexico, western Texas).

Tagetes micrantha is an annual herb sometimes reaching as much as 35 cm (14 inches) tall. Leaves are up to 35 mm (1.4 inches) long, pinnately compound very narrow leaflets. The plant generally produces only one flower head per stem, each head usually with no ray florets but occasionally 1 or 2, along with 5-6 disc florets. Flowers bloom August to September. The plant is found in disturbed sites as well as in open woodlands with scattered pines and junipers.
