= Tagetes parryi =

Scientific classification
- Kingdom: Plantae
- Clade: Tracheophytes
- Clade: Angiosperms
- Clade: Eudicots
- Clade: Asterids
- Order: Asterales
- Family: Asteraceae
- Genus: Tagetes
- Species: T. parryi

Binomial name
- Tagetes parryi A.Gray

Species of flowering plant

Tagetes parryi is a Mesoamerican species of marigold in the family Asteraceae. It has been found only in the State of San Luis Potosí in northeastern Mexico.

Tagetes parryi is a branching perennial herb up to 30 cm (12 inches) tall. Leaves are pinnately compound with 5-7 leaflets. The plant produces one flower head per flower stalk, yellow, each head containing 8 ray florets surrounding numerous disc florets.
