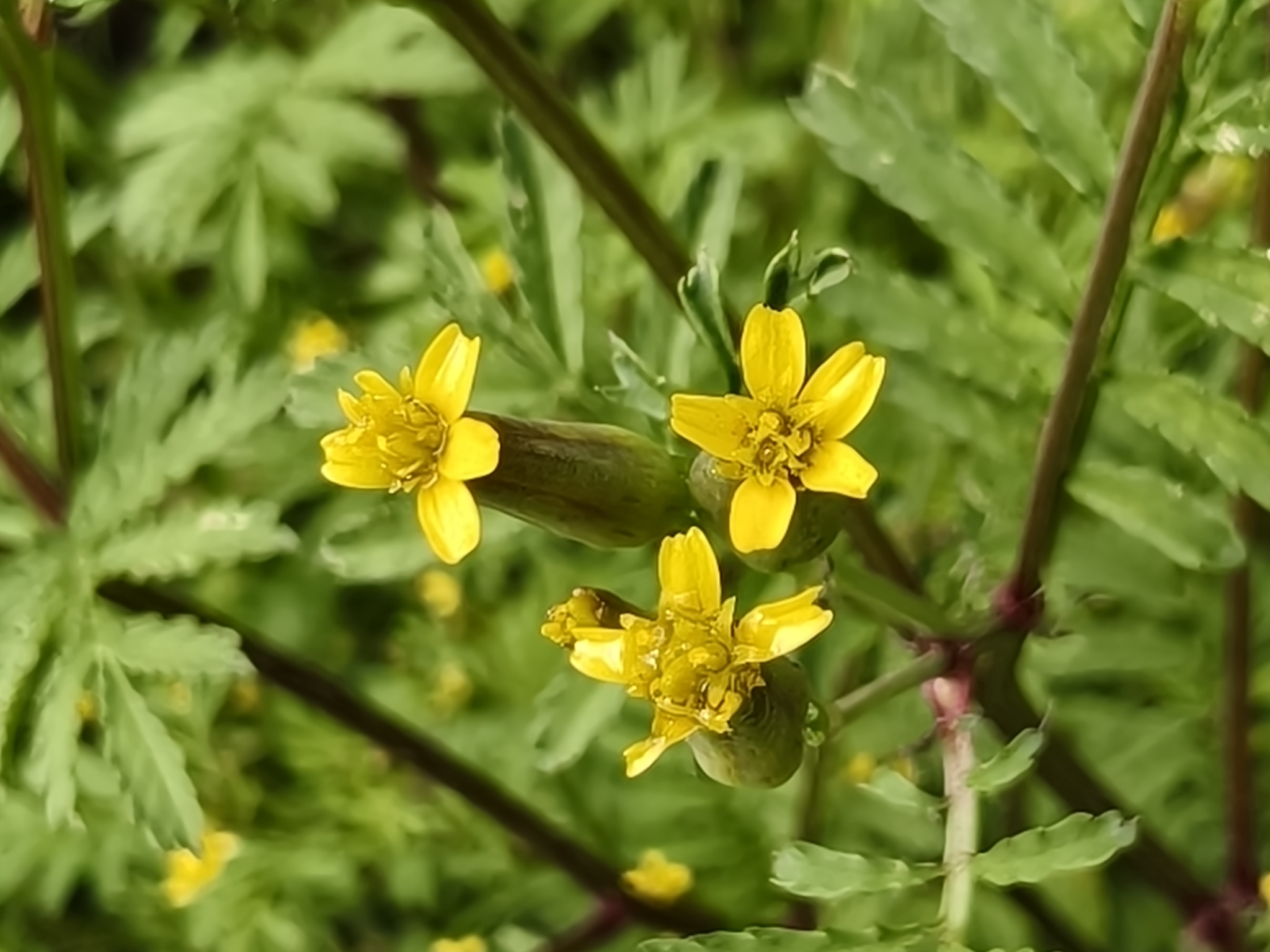

Scientific classification
- Kingdom: Plantae
- Clade: Tracheophytes
- Clade: Angiosperms
- Clade: Eudicots
- Clade: Asterids
- Order: Asterales
- Family: Asteraceae
- Genus: Tagetes
- Species: T. foetidissima

Binomial name
- Tagetes foetidissima DC.

= Tagetes foetidissima =

Species of flowering plant

Tagetes foetidissima is a Mesoamerican species of marigolds in the family Asteraceae. It is widespread across much of Mexico and Central America from Tamaulipas to Costa Rica. Common name is "flor de muerto," Spanish for "death flower."

Tagetes foetidissima is a branching annual herb sometimes as much as 100 cm (40 inches) tall. Leaves are up to 9 cm (3.6 inches) long, divided into 11-29 toothed leaflets. One plant produces many small flower heads in a flat-topped array, each head contains 5 small, pale yellow ray florets surrounding about 7 greenish-yellow disc florets. The head is cylindrical, with purple bracts along the outside.

The plant grows in disturbed areas and has been reported as a weed in cultivated maize fields. It is aromatic but with an odor that most humans find disagreeable.
