= Tagetes oaxacana =

Scientific classification
- Kingdom: Plantae
- Clade: Tracheophytes
- Clade: Angiosperms
- Clade: Eudicots
- Clade: Asterids
- Order: Asterales
- Family: Asteraceae
- Genus: Tagetes
- Species: T. oaxacana

Binomial name
- Tagetes oaxacana B.L.Turner 1988

Species of aquatic plant

Tagetes oaxacana is a Mexican species of plant in the family Asteraceae. It has been found only in the State of Oaxaca in southern Mexico.

Tagetes oaxacana is an erect hairless shrub up to 100 cm (40 inches) tall. Leaves are once-pinnate, the lobes very narrow and thread-like with many glands along their lengths. The plant produces flower heads one per flowering stalk, each head with 5 yellow Ray florets surrounding 30-40 yellow Disc florets. The plant grows on rocky limestone slopes.
