= Tagetes hartwegii =

Scientific classification
- Kingdom: Plantae
- Clade: Tracheophytes
- Clade: Angiosperms
- Clade: Eudicots
- Clade: Asterids
- Order: Asterales
- Family: Asteraceae
- Genus: Tagetes
- Species: T. hartwegii

Binomial name
- Tagetes hartwegii Greenm.

Species of flowering plant

Tagetes hartwegii is a Mexican species of marigolds in the family Asteraceae.

It is endemic to the states of Jalisco and Nayarit in western Mexico.

== Description ==
Tagetes hartwegii is a hairless perennial herb up that can grow up to 90 cm (3 feet) tall. Its stem is woody at the base. The leaves are bipinnate, and can reach up to 8 cm (3.2 inches) long.

The flower heads are yellow-orange, each containing 8 ray florets and 35-40 disc florets.
