= Tagetes mandonii =

Scientific classification
- Kingdom: Plantae
- Clade: Tracheophytes
- Clade: Angiosperms
- Clade: Eudicots
- Clade: Asterids
- Order: Asterales
- Family: Asteraceae
- Genus: Tagetes
- Species: T. mandonii

Binomial name
- Tagetes mandonii Sch.Bip. ex Klatt 1889

Species of flowering plant

Tagetes mandonii is a Bolivian species of marigolds in the family Asteraceae. It is native to La Paz Department and Cochabamba Department in Bolivia.

Tagetes mandonii is an erect herb with opposite leaves. Stem is thin. Leaves are highly dissected. Flower heads are yellow, each containing 6 ray florets and 11 disc florets.
