= Tagetes iltisiana =

Scientific classification
- Kingdom: Plantae
- Clade: Tracheophytes
- Clade: Angiosperms
- Clade: Eudicots
- Clade: Asterids
- Order: Asterales
- Family: Asteraceae
- Genus: Tagetes
- Species: T. iltisiana

Binomial name
- Tagetes iltisiana H.Rob.

Species of flowering plant

Tagetes iltisiana is a Bolivian species of marigolds in the family Asteraceae. It is native to La Paz Department and Cochabamba Department in Bolivia.

Tagetes iltisiana is an annual herb up to 25 cm (10 inches) tall. Stem is thin. Leaves are highly divided, up to 4 cm (1.6 inches) long. Flower heads are yellow, each containing 1-2 ray florets and 4-5 disc florets.
