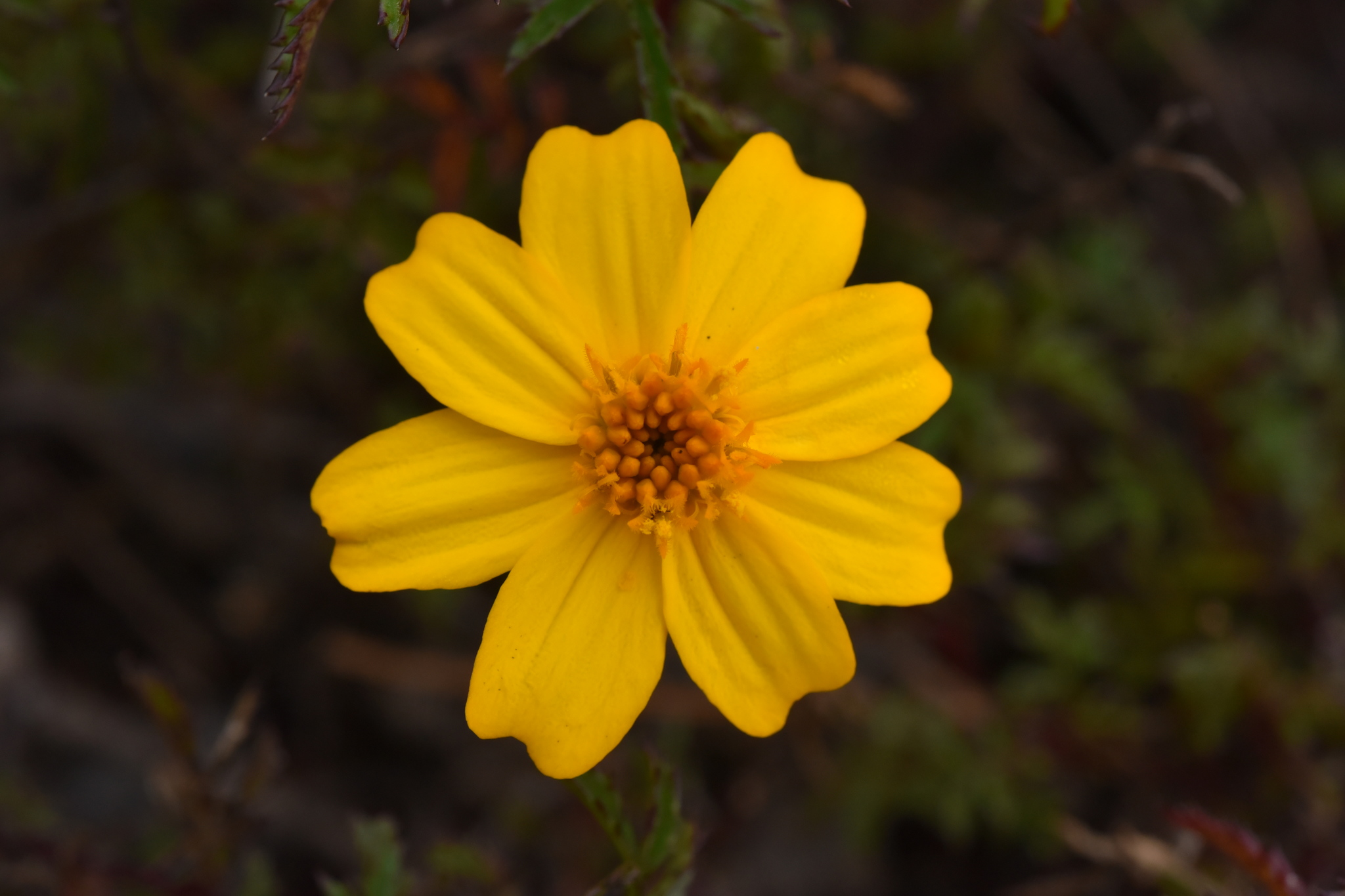

Scientific classification
- Kingdom: Plantae
- Clade: Tracheophytes
- Clade: Angiosperms
- Clade: Eudicots
- Clade: Asterids
- Order: Asterales
- Family: Asteraceae
- Genus: Tagetes
- Species: T. moorei

Binomial name
- Tagetes moorei H.Rob.

= Tagetes moorei =

Species of flowering plant

Tagetes moorei is a Mexican species of marigold in the family Asteraceae. It is endemic to the states of Hidalgo and Querétaro in central Mexico.

== Description ==
Tagetes moorei is a perennial herb up to 30 cm (12 inches) tall. Leaves are highly divided, up to 2.5 cm (1.0 inches) long. Flower heads are yellow, each containing about 8 ray florets and 40 or more disc florets.
