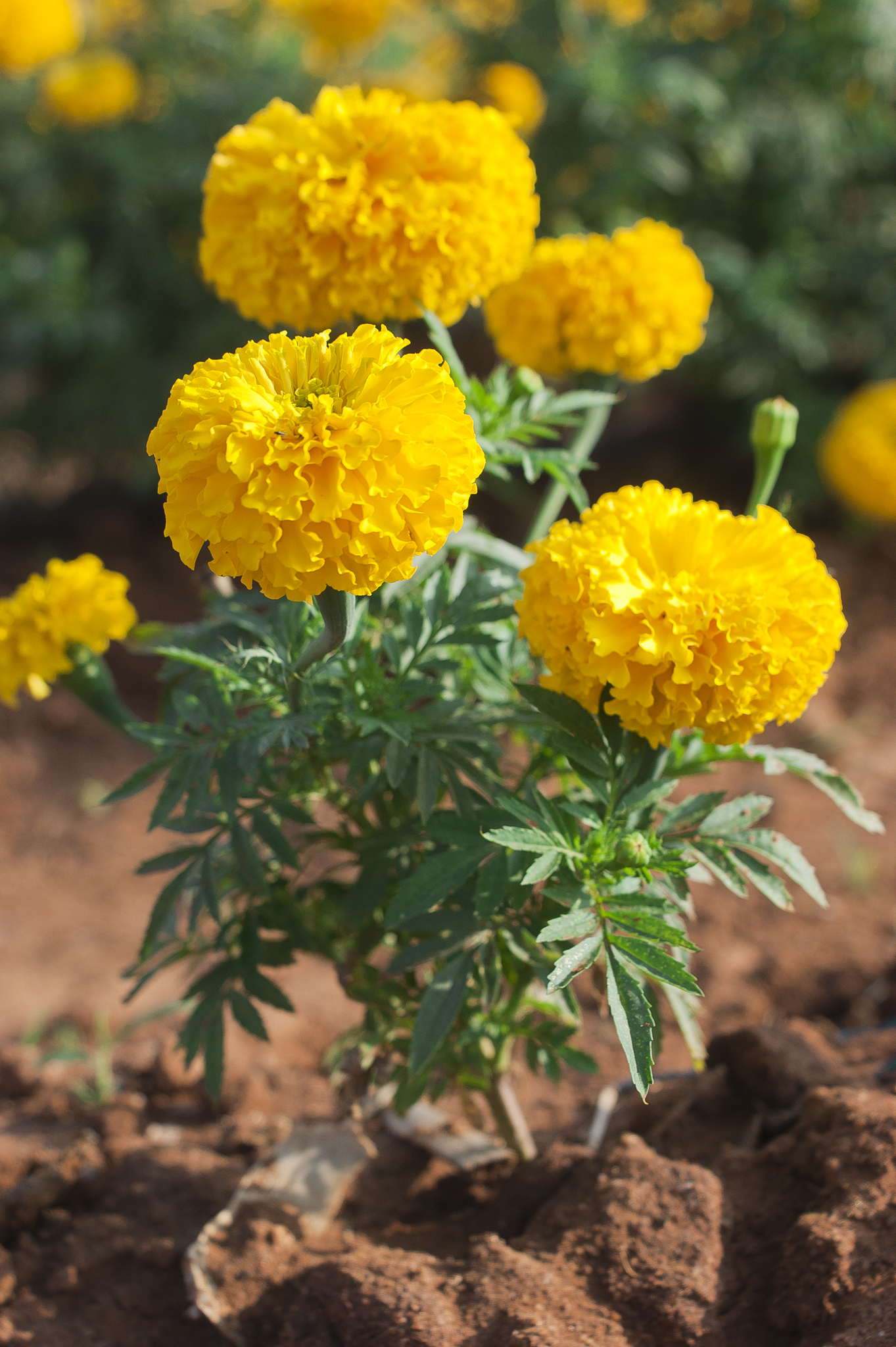
- Tagetes erecta

Scientific classification
- Kingdom: Plantae
- Clade: Tracheophytes
- Clade: Angiosperms
- Clade: Eudicots
- Clade: Asterids
- Order: Asterales
- Family: Asteraceae
- Subfamily: Asteroideae
- Tribe: Tageteae
- Subtribe: Pectidinae
- Genus: Tagetes; L.

Synonyms
- Adenopappus Benth.; Diglossus Cass.; Enalcida Cass.; Solenotheca Nutt.; Vilobia Strother

= Tagetes =

Marigold

Genus of flowering plant

Tagetes (/tæˈdʒiːtiːz/) is a genus of 50 species of annual or perennial, mostly herbaceous plants in the family Asteraceae. They are among several groups of plants known in English as marigolds. The genus Tagetes was formally named by Carl Linnaeus in 1753. Linnaeus cited Joseph Pitton de Tournefort (1700), Johann Jacob Dillenius (1732), Gaspard Bauhin (1623) and Fabio Colonna (1606) as authors who used the name 'Tagetes' before. In 1754 he published the formal description in his Genera Plantarum, referring to Tournefort, Sébastien Vaillant (1720) and Dillenius for the name 'Tagetes'.

Originally called cempōhualxōchitl, by the Nahua people, these plants are native to Central and Southern Mexico and several other Latin American countries. Some species have become naturalized around the world. One species, T. minuta, is considered a noxious invasive species in some areas.

== Description ==
Tagetes species vary in size from 0.1 to 2.2 m tall. Most species have pinnate green leaves. Blooms naturally occur in golden, orange, yellow, and white colors, often with maroon highlights. Flower heads are typically (1-) to 4–6 cm diameter, generally with both ray florets and disc florets. In horticulture, they tend to be planted as annuals, although the perennial species are gaining popularity. Like all marigolds, they have a fibrous root system.

Depending on the species, Tagetes species grow well in almost any sort of soil. Most horticultural selections grow best in soil with good drainage, and some cultivars are known to have good tolerance to drought.

== Nomenclature ==
The Latin Tagētes terrestis derives from the Tages in Etruscan mythology, born from plowing the earth. It likely refers to the ease with which plants of this genus come out each year either by the seeds produced in the previous year, or by the stems which regrow from the stump already in place.

The common name in English, marigold, is derived from Mary's gold in honor of the Virgin Mary, a name first applied to a similar plant native to Europe, Calendula officinalis.

The most commonly cultivated varieties of Tagetes are known variously as African marigolds (usually referring to cultivars and hybrids of Tagetes erecta), or French marigolds (usually referring to hybrids and cultivars of Tagetes patula, many of which were developed in France). The so-called signet marigolds are hybrids derived mostly from Tagetes tenuifolia.

== Cultivation and uses ==
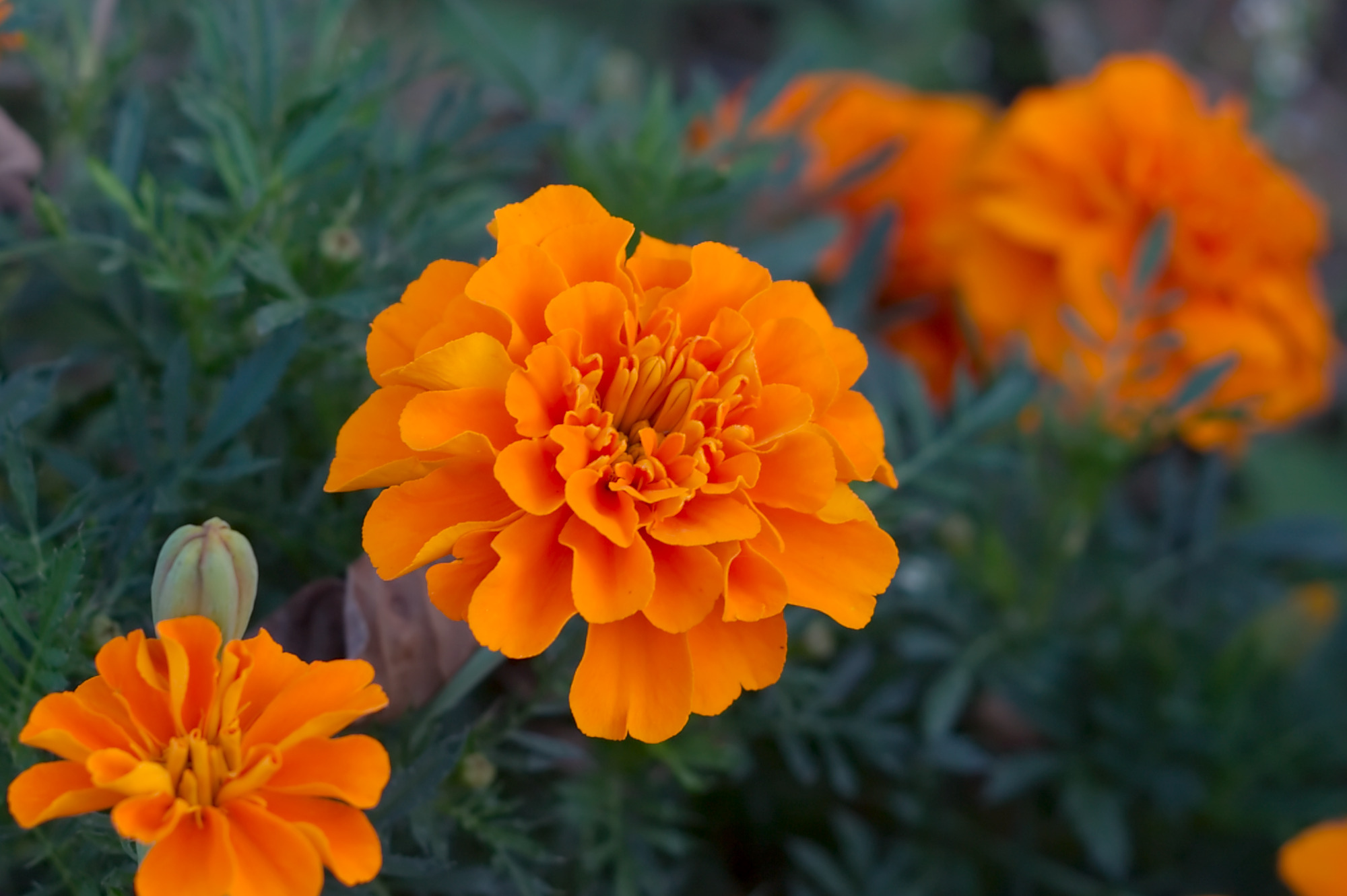
Tagetes patula flower heads

Depending on the species, marigold foliage has a musky, pungent scent, though some varieties have been bred to be scentless. Due to antibacterial thiophenes exuded by the roots, Tagetes should not be planted near any legume crop. Some of the perennial species are deer-, rabbit-, rodent- and javelina or peccary-resistant.

T. minuta (khakibush or huacatay), originally from South America, has been used as a source of essential oil for the perfume industry known as tagette or "marigold oil", and as a flavourant in the food and tobacco industries. It is commonly cultivated in South Africa, where the species is also a useful pioneer plant in the reclamation of disturbed land.

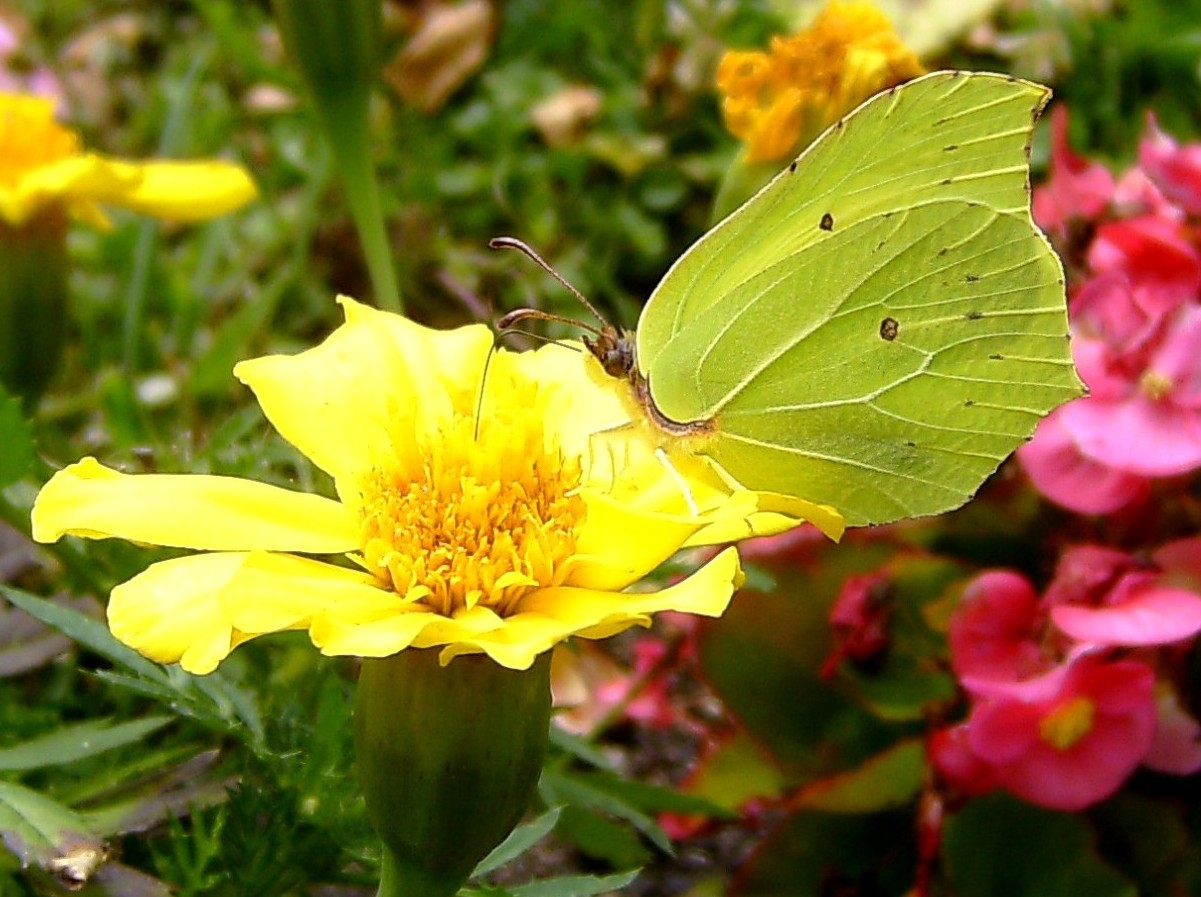
Gonepteryx rhamni sucking nectar

The florets of Tagetes erecta are rich in the orange-yellow carotenoid lutein and are used as a food colour (INS number E161b) in the European Union for foods such as pasta, vegetable oil, margarine, mayonnaise, salad dressing, baked goods, confectionery, dairy products, ice cream, yogurt, citrus juice and mustard. In the United States, however, the powders and extracts are only approved as colorants in animal feed.

Marigolds are recorded as a food plant for some Lepidoptera caterpillars including the dot moth, and a nectar source for other butterflies and bumblebees. They are often part of butterfly gardening plantings. In the wild, many species are pollinated by beetles.

== Cultural significance ==
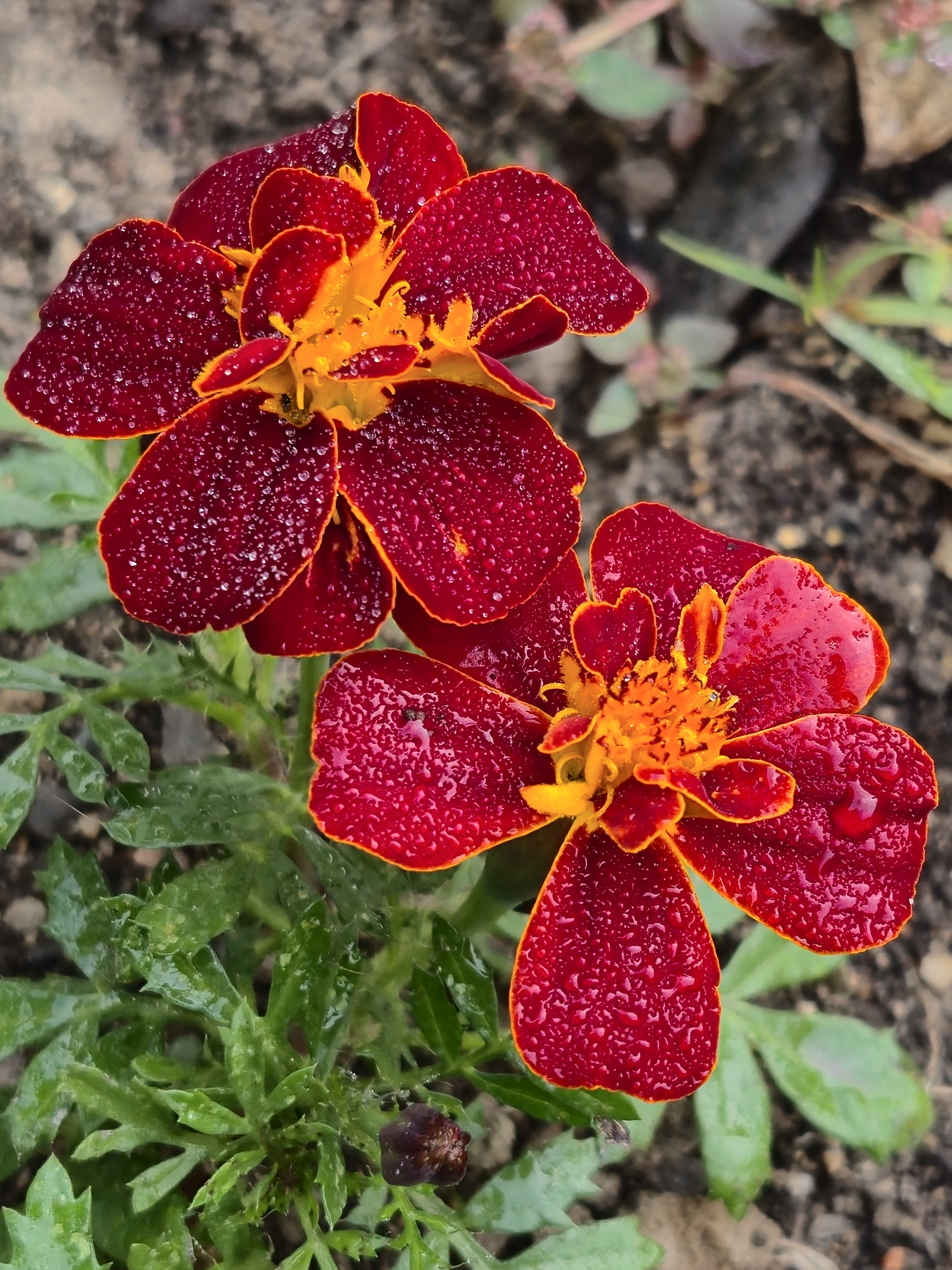
Tagetes sp. cultivated in Brazil (possibly Tagetes patula)

=== Tagetes lucida ===
The species Tagetes lucida, known as pericón, is used to prepare a sweetish, anise-flavored medicinal tea in Mexico. It is also used as a culinary herb in many warm climates, as a substitute for tarragon, and offered in the nursery as "Texas tarragon" or "Mexican mint marigold".

=== Tagetes minuta ===
Tagetes minuta, native to southern South America, is a tall, upright marigold plant with small flowers used as a culinary herb in Peru, Ecuador, and parts of Chile and Bolivia, where it is called by the Incan term huacatay. The paste is used to make the popular potato dish called ocopa. Having both "green" and "yellow/orange" notes, the taste and odor of fresh T. minuta is like a mixture of sweet basil, tarragon, mint and citrus. It is also used as a medicinal tea for gastrointestinal complaints and specifically against nematodes.

=== Tagetes erecta ===
Tagetes erecta is widely used in Day of the Dead celebrations in Mexico.

=== Tagetes – various species ===
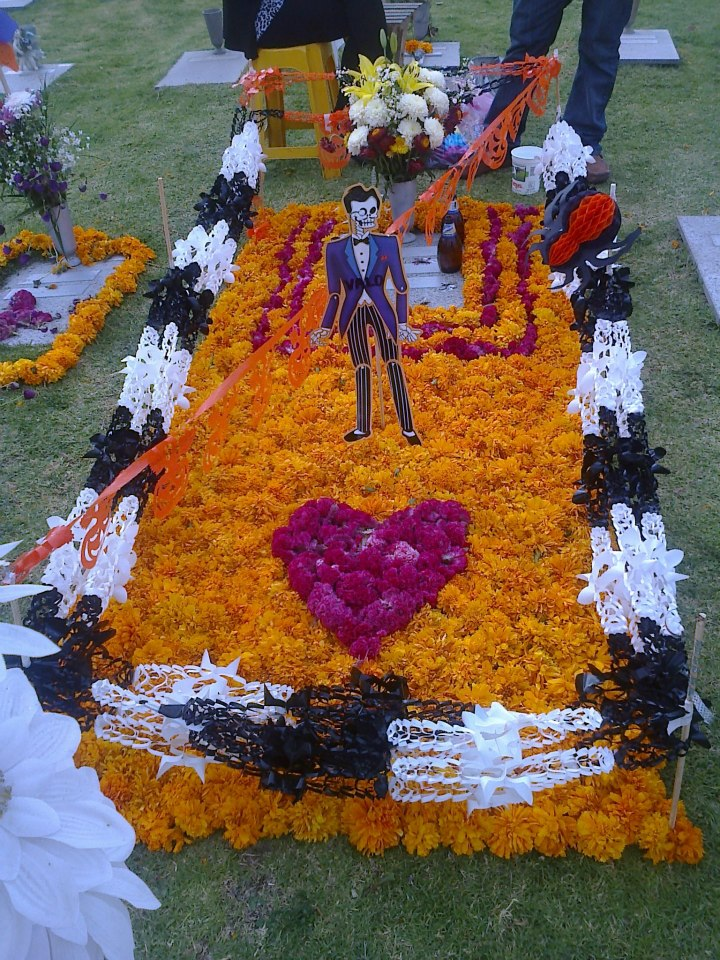
Marigolds decorating a grave for Day of the Dead in Mexico

In Bangladesh, India and other South Asian countries, marigold is used for ornamentation purposes in functions like the turmeric ceremony, weddings, Pohela Falgun and other functions. During the colonial period the native varieties of these flowers were replaced by American species like T. erecta, T. patula and T. tenuifolia. The marigold is also widely cultivated in India and Thailand, particularly the species T. erecta, Tagetes patula and T. tenuifolia. It is always sold in the markets for daily rituals. Vast quantities of marigolds are used in garlands and decoration for weddings, festivals, and religious events. Marigold cultivation is extensively seen in Telangana, Andhra Pradesh, Tamil Nadu, West Bengal, Karnataka and Uttar Pradesh (for the Vijayadashami and Diwali markets) states of India.

In Ukraine, chornobryvtsi (T. erecta, T. patula and the signet marigold, l. tenuifolia) are regarded as one of the national symbols, and are often mentioned in songs, poems and tales.

== Species ==
Accepted species

- Tagetes apetala
- Tagetes arenicola
- Tagetes argentina Cabrera
- Tagetes biflora Cabrera
- Tagetes campanulata Griseb.
- Tagetes coronopifolia
- Tagetes daucoides
- Tagetes elliptica Sm. – Chincho
- Tagetes elongata
- Tagetes epapposa
- Tagetes erecta L. – African marigold, Aztec marigold
- Tagetes filifolia Lag.
- Tagetes foetidissima DC.
- Tagetes hartwegii
- Tagetes hartwegii Greenm.
- Tagetes iltisiana Rydb.
- Tagetes inclusa
- Tagetes lacera
- Tagetes laxa Cabrera
- Tagetes lemmonii A.Gray – Mt. Lemmon marigold, Mexican marigold
- Tagetes linifolia
- Tagetes lucida Cav. – Mexican mint marigold, Texas tarragon
- Tagetes lunulata
- Tagetes mandonii
- Tagetes mendocina Phil.
- Tagetes micrantha Cav. – licorice marigold
- Tagetes microglossa
- Tagetes minima
- Tagetes minuta L. – wild marigold, huacatay
- Tagetes moorei
- Tagetes mulleri S.F.Blake
- Tagetes multiflora Kunth
- Tagetes nelsonii Greenm.
- Tagetes oaxacana
- Tagetes osteni
- Tagetes palmeri
- Tagetes parryi A.Gray
- Tagetes patula L. – French marigold
- Tagetes perezii Cabrera
- Tagetes persicifolia (Benth.) B.L.Turner
- Tagetes praetermissa
- Tagetes pringlei S.Watson
- Tagetes pusilla
- Tagetes riojana M.Ferraro
- Tagetes rupestris Cabrera
- Tagetes stenophylla B.L.Rob.
- Tagetes subulata Cerv.
- Tagetes subvillosa
- Tagetes tenuifolia Cav. – signet marigold
- Tagetes terniflora Kunth
- Tagetes triradiata
- Tagetes verticillata Lag. & Rodr.
- Tagetes zypaquirensis Humb. & Bonpl.

== Gallery ==
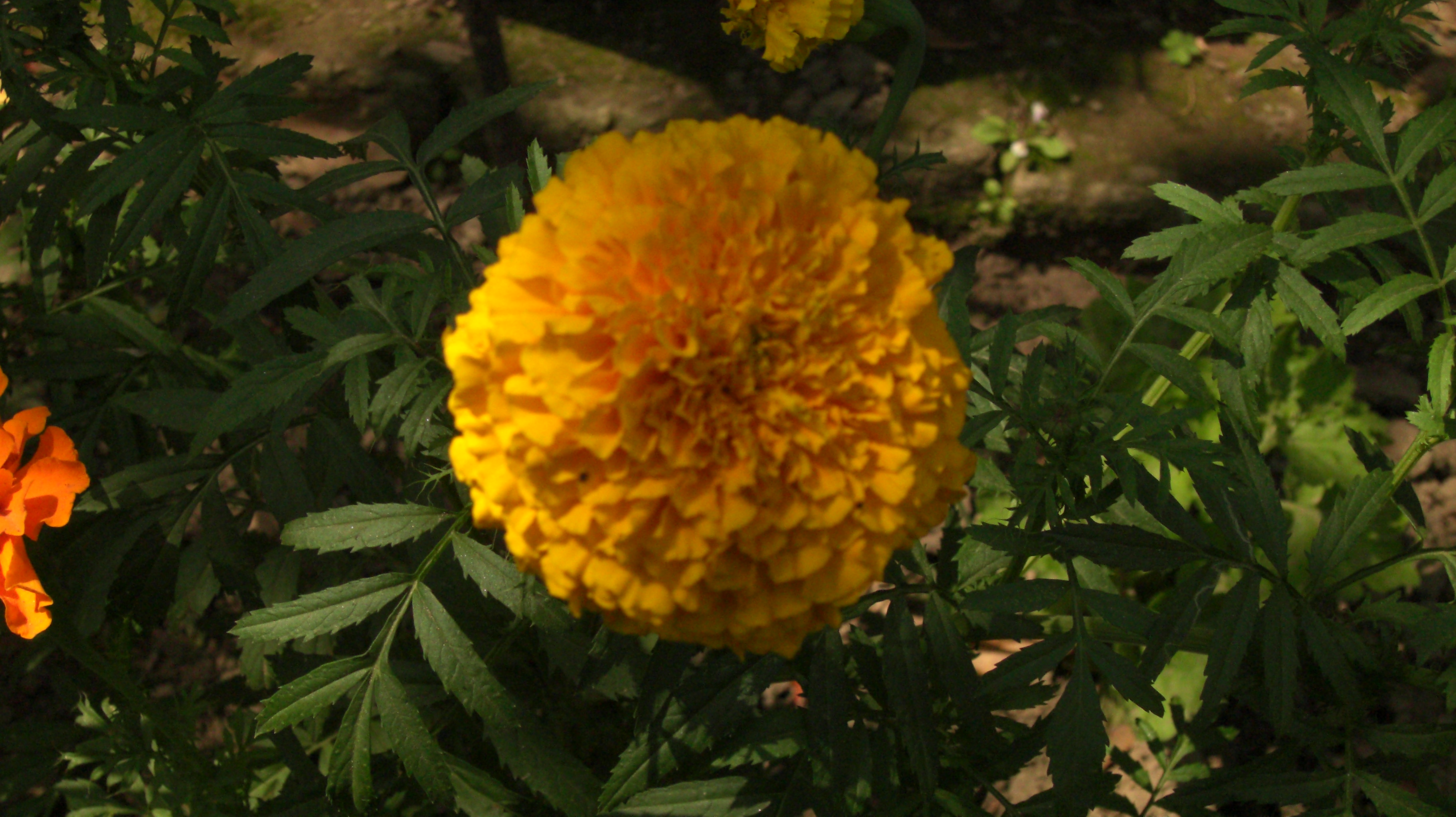
Yellow marigold

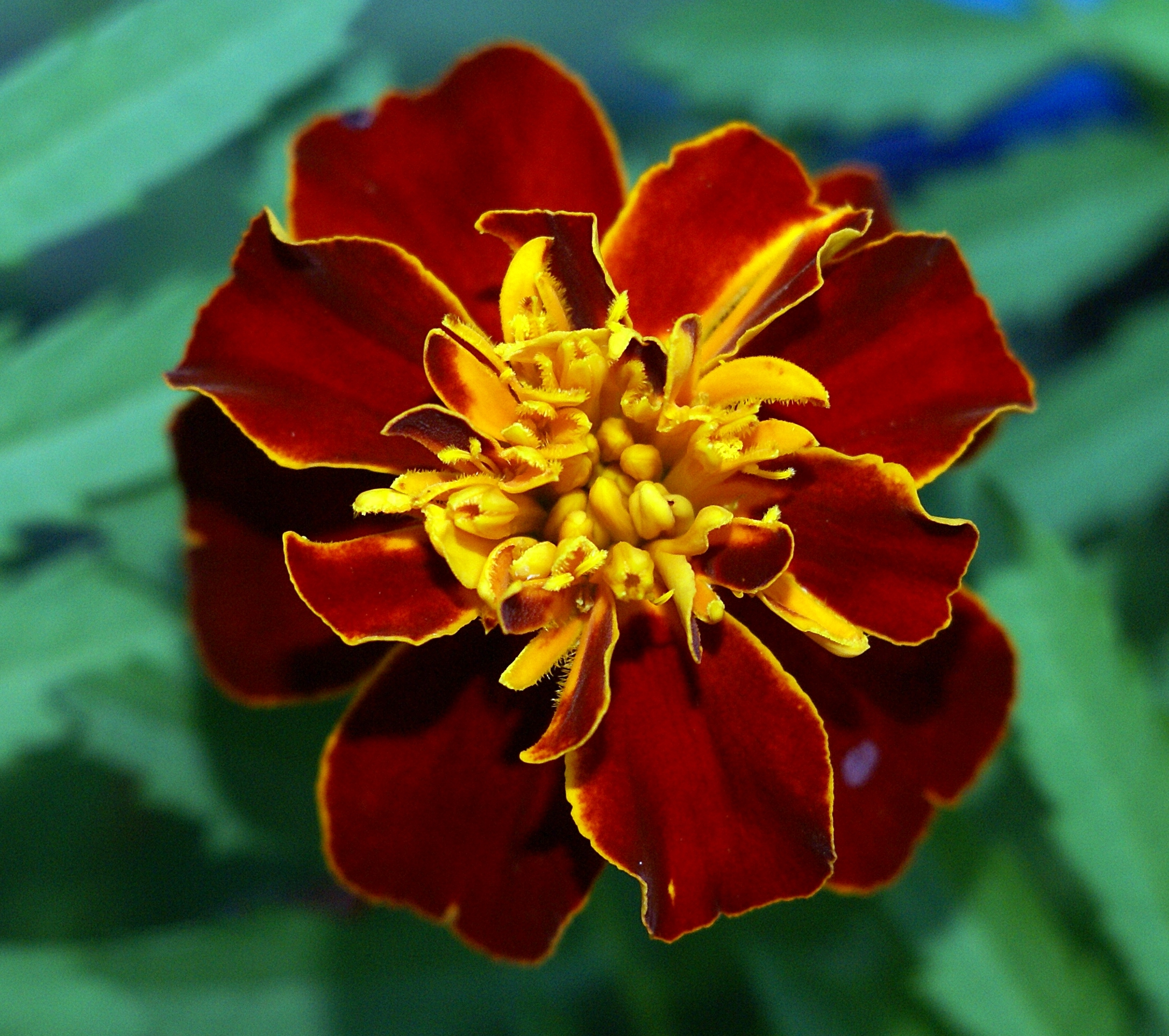
A marigold flower head

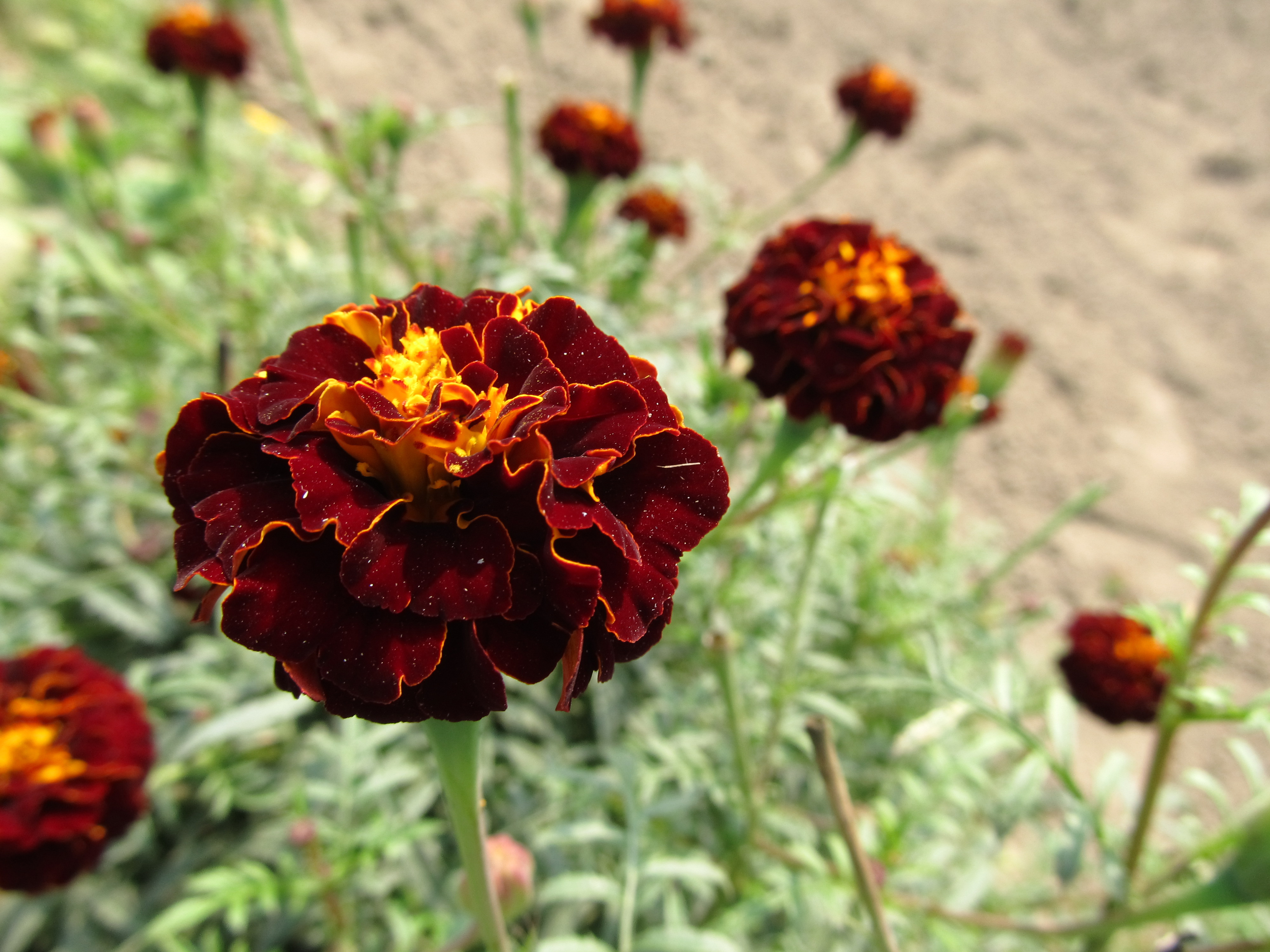
Tagetes patula
(hybrid marigold)

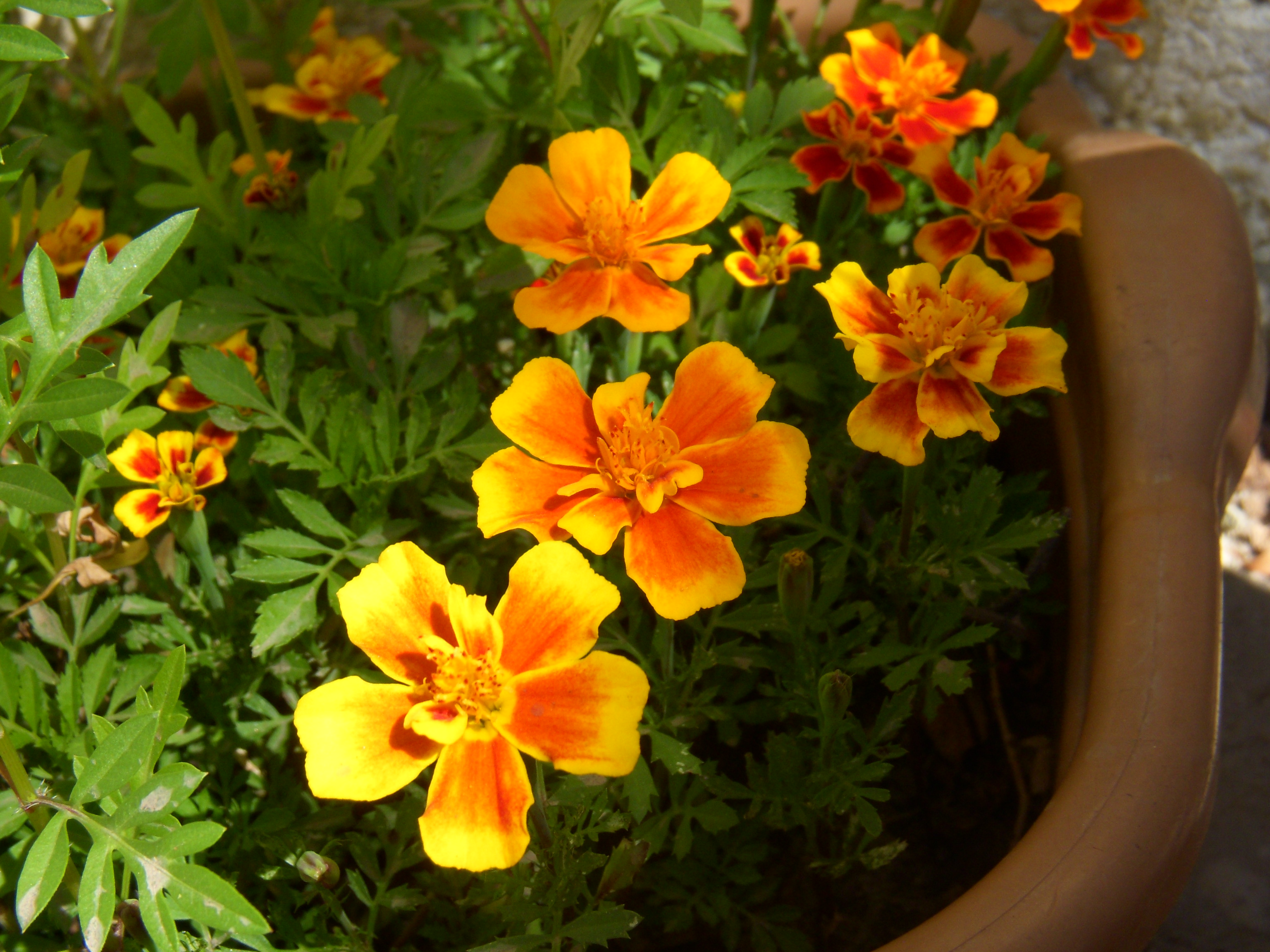
Tagetes patula

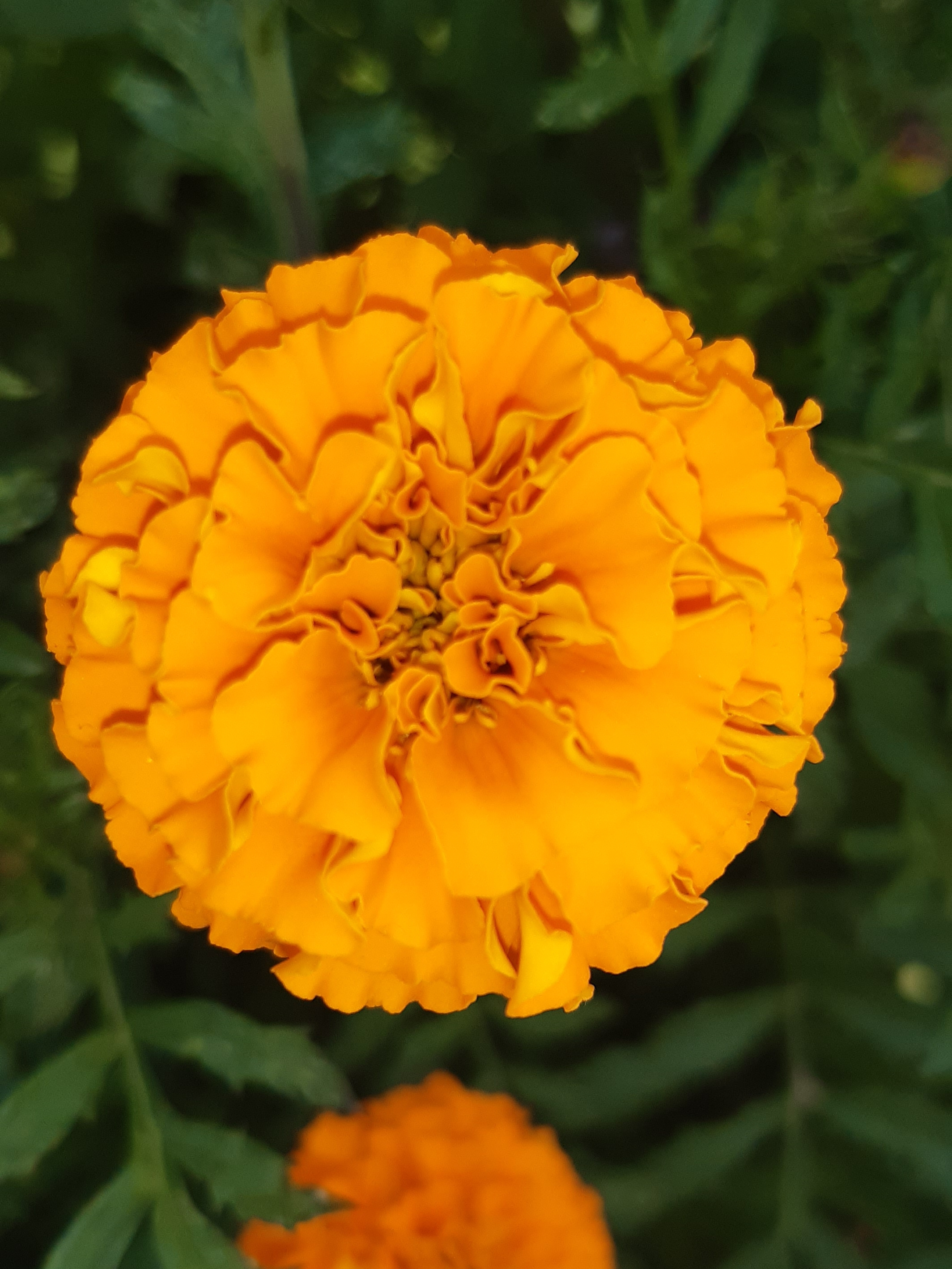
Tagetes erecta flower head

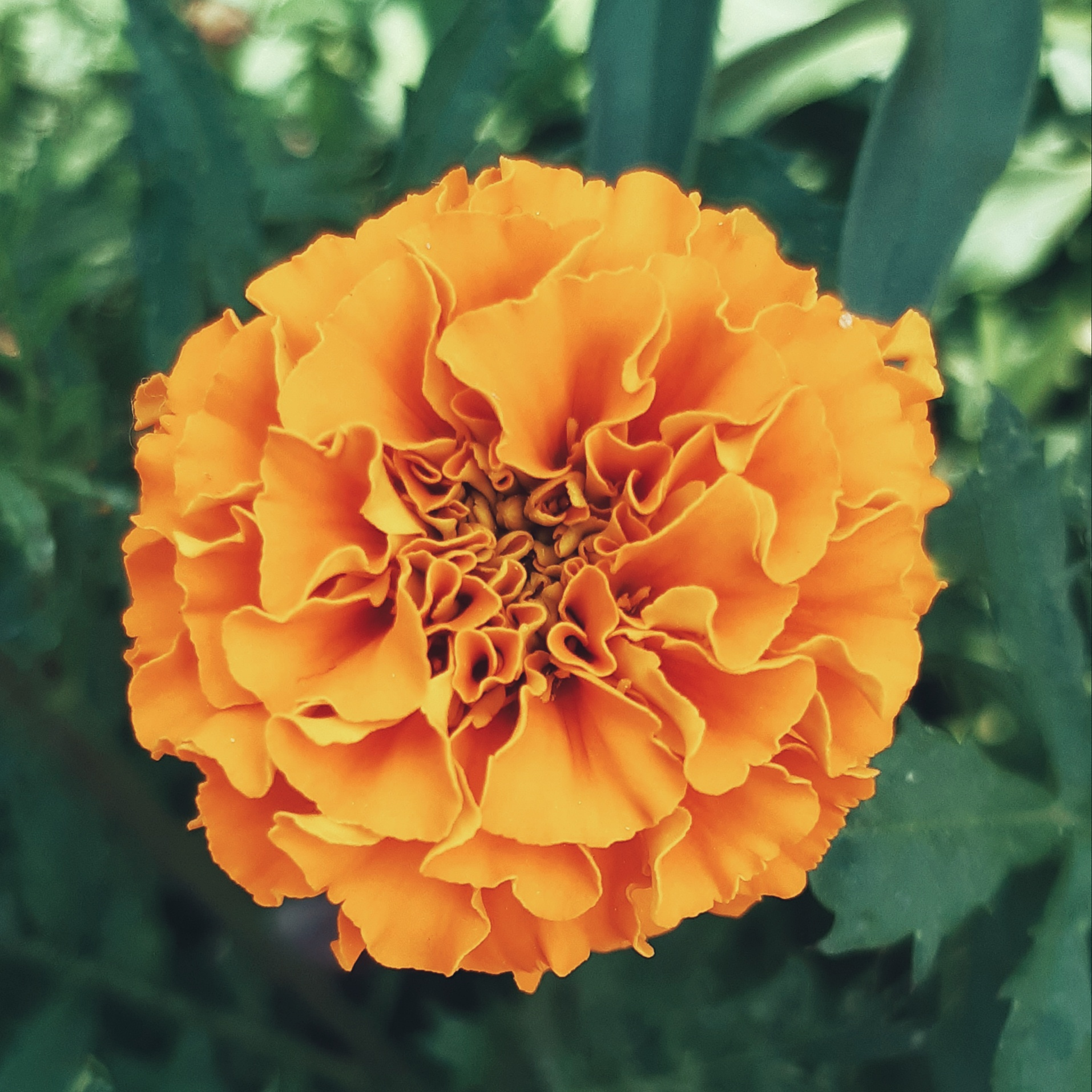
Tagetes erecta flower head

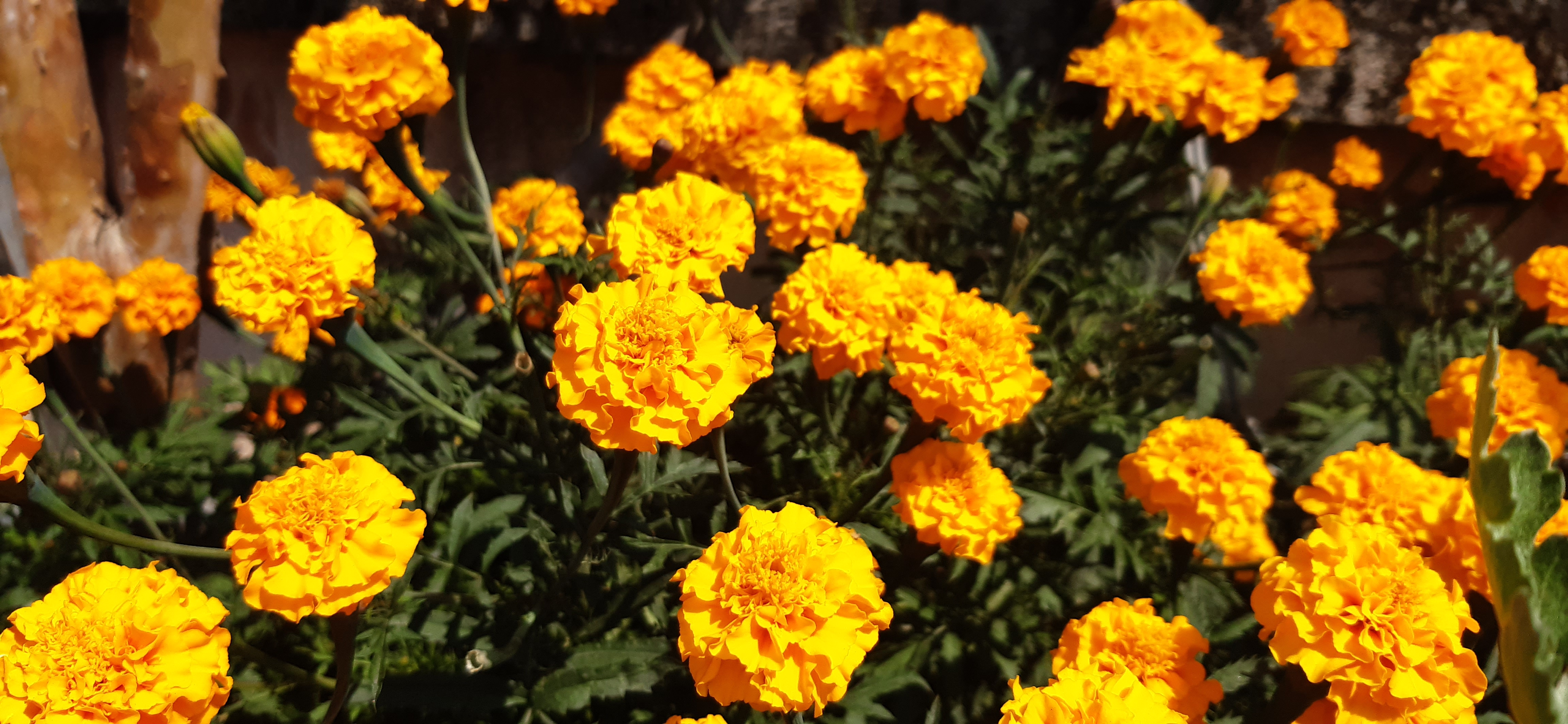
Tagetes flower heads

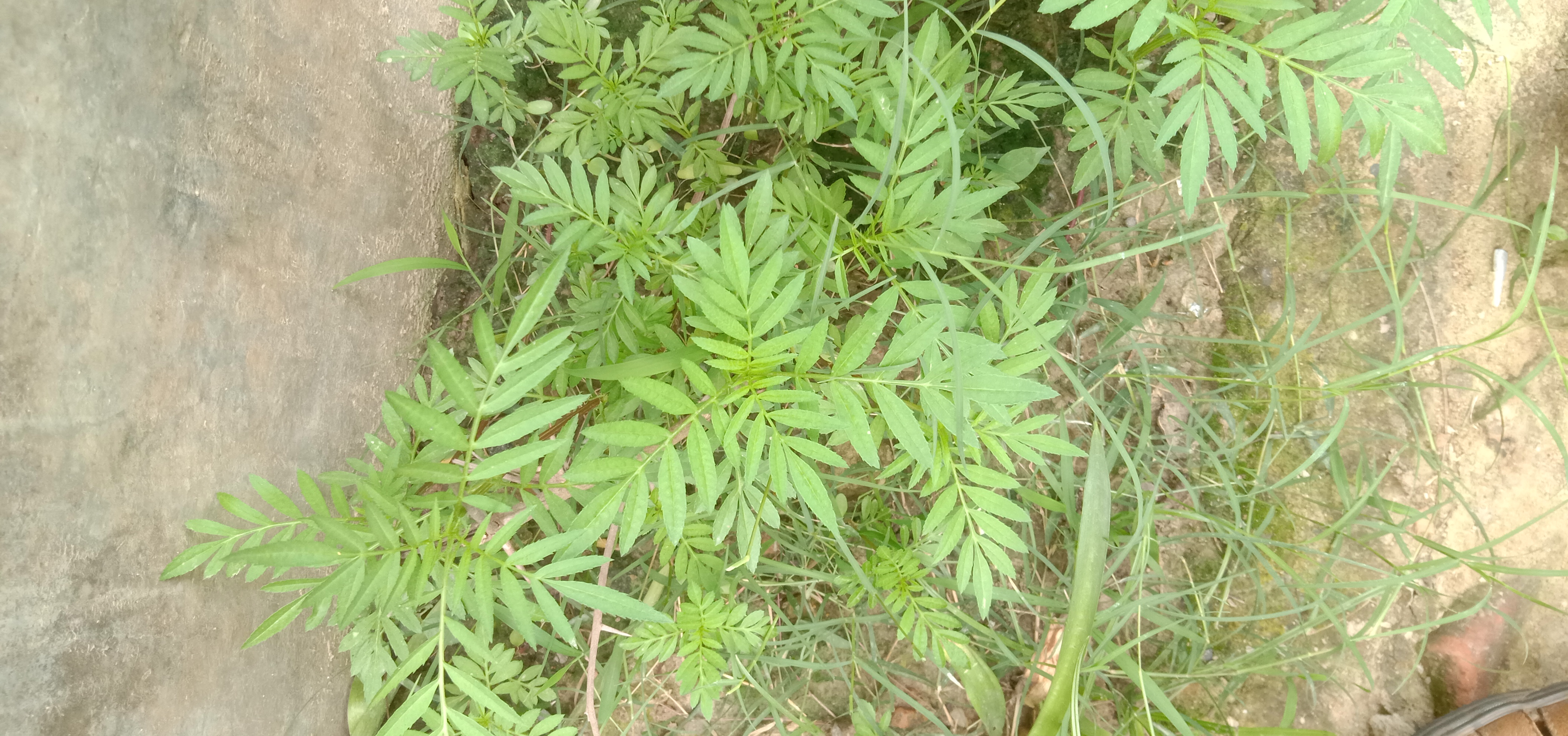
Newly grown plants (West Bengal, India).

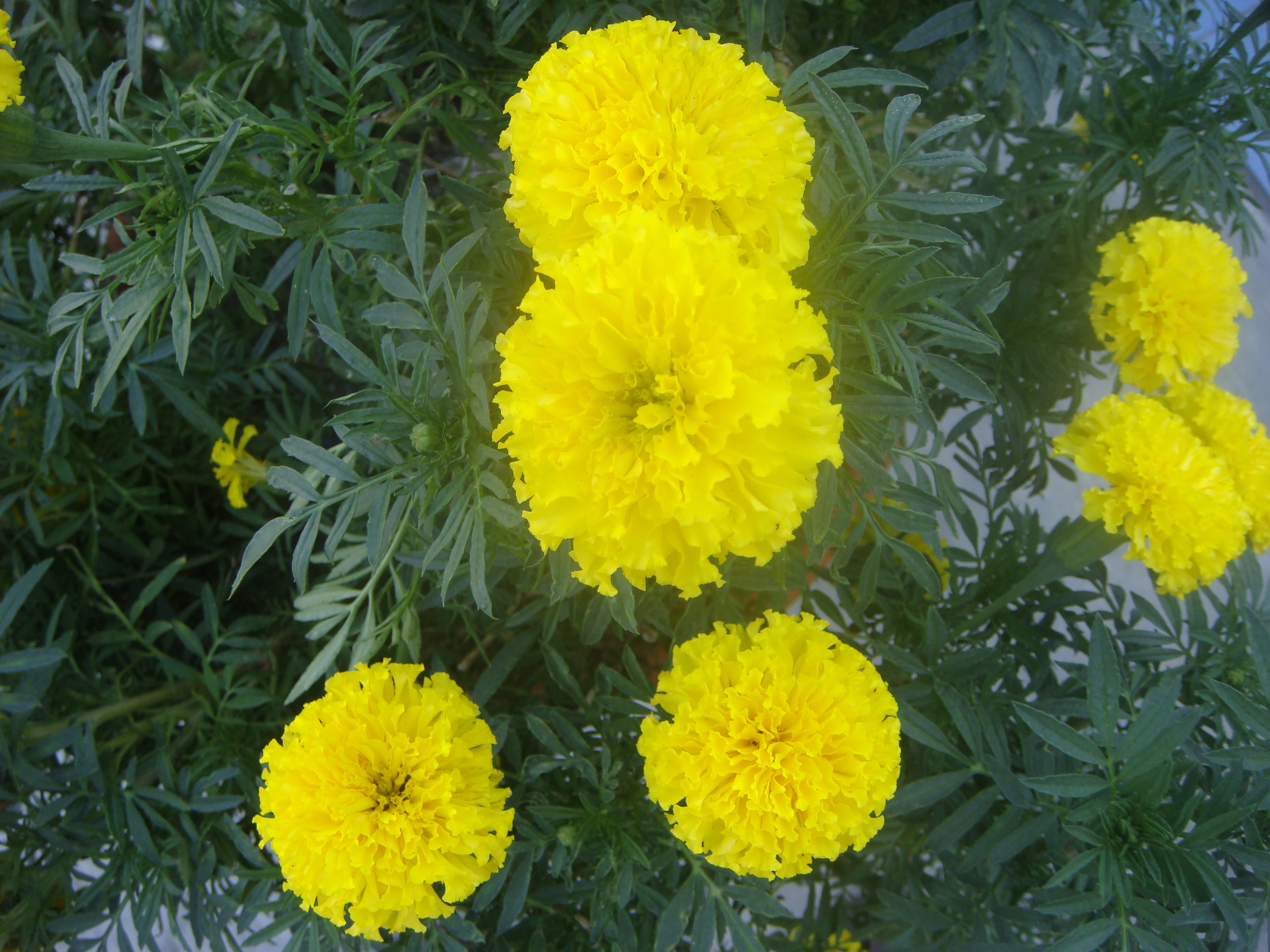
'Maxima Yellow' (Philippines)

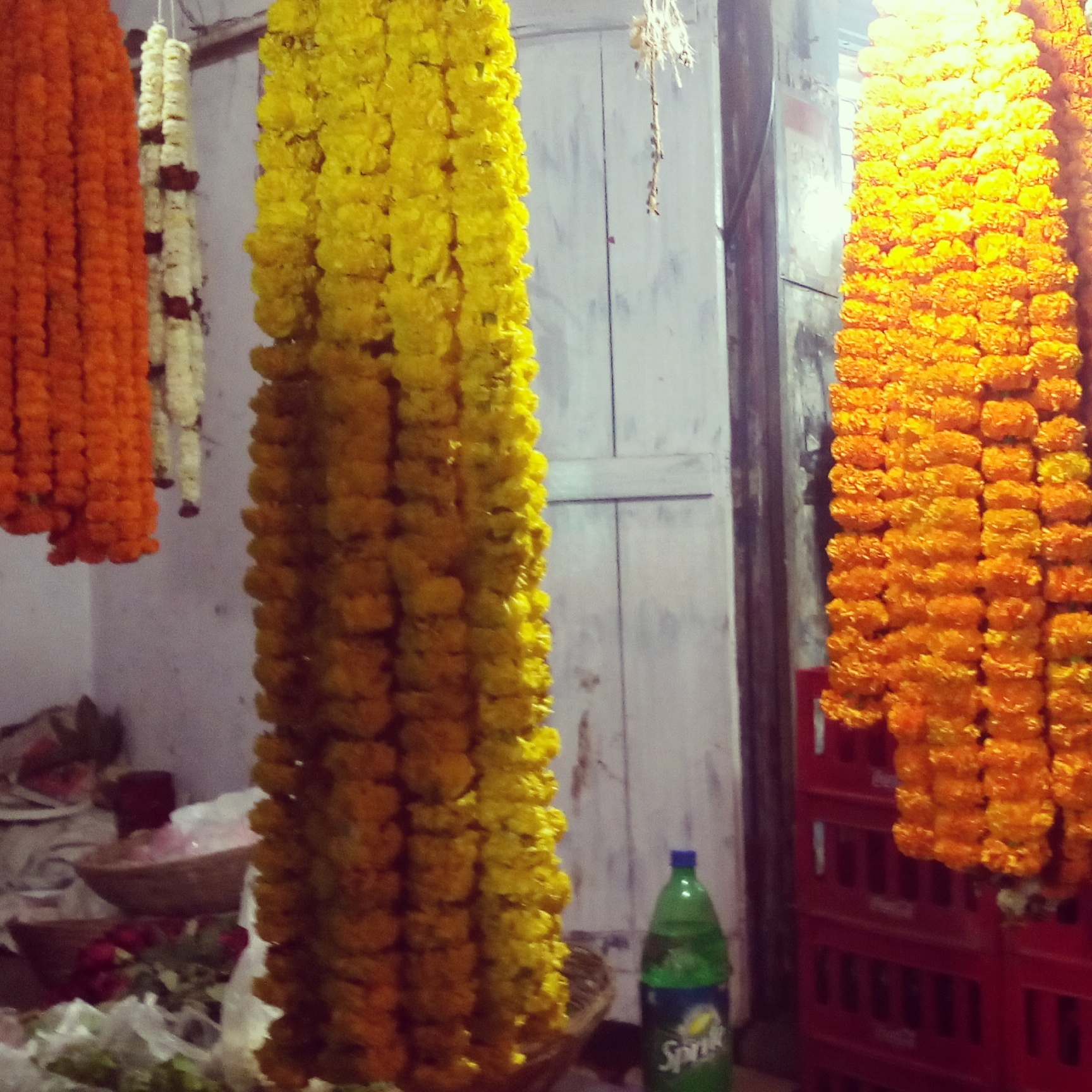
Marigold varieties prepared as offerings to a god during the Hindu festival of Maha Shivaratri

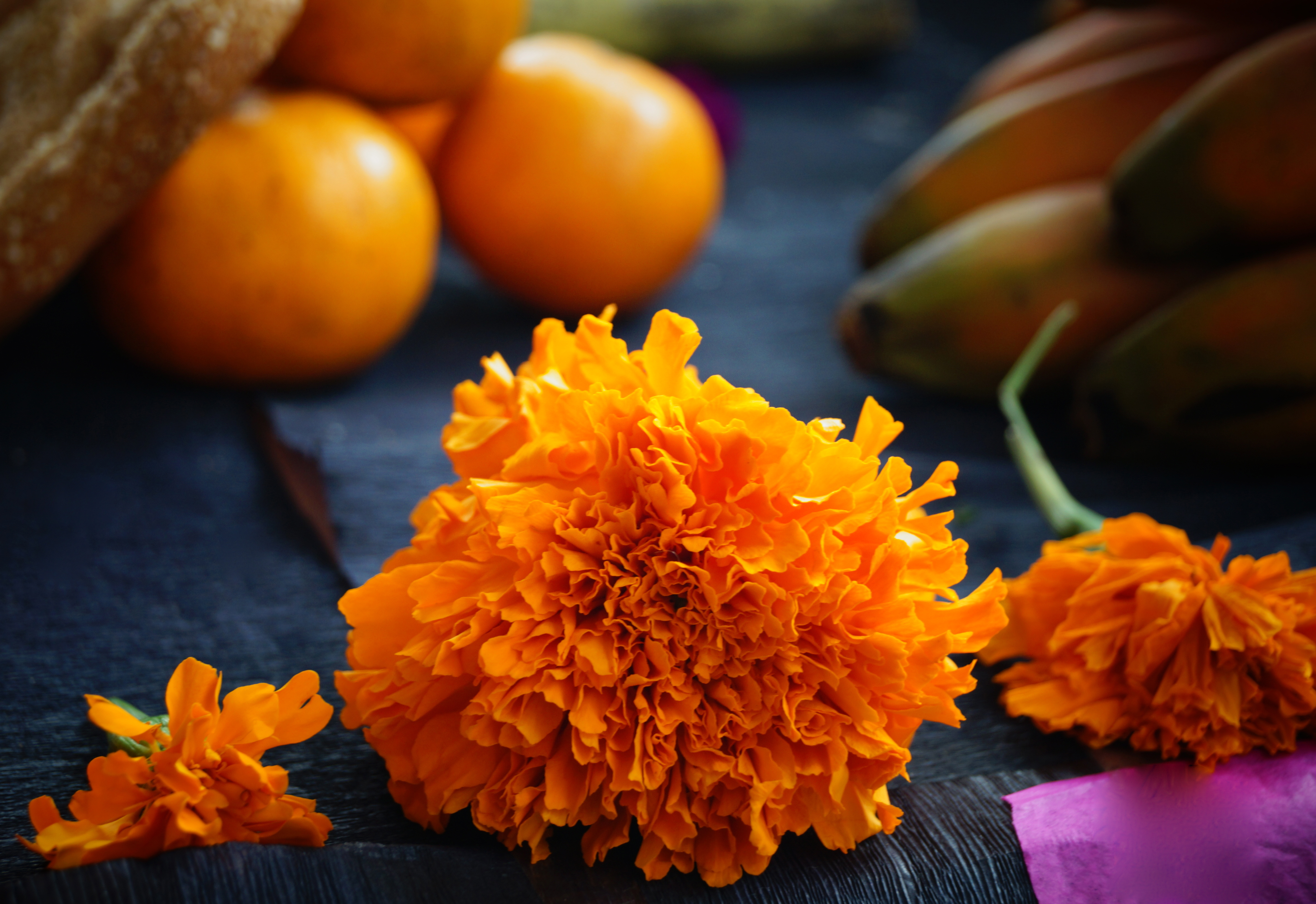
Marigold on an altar in Mexico

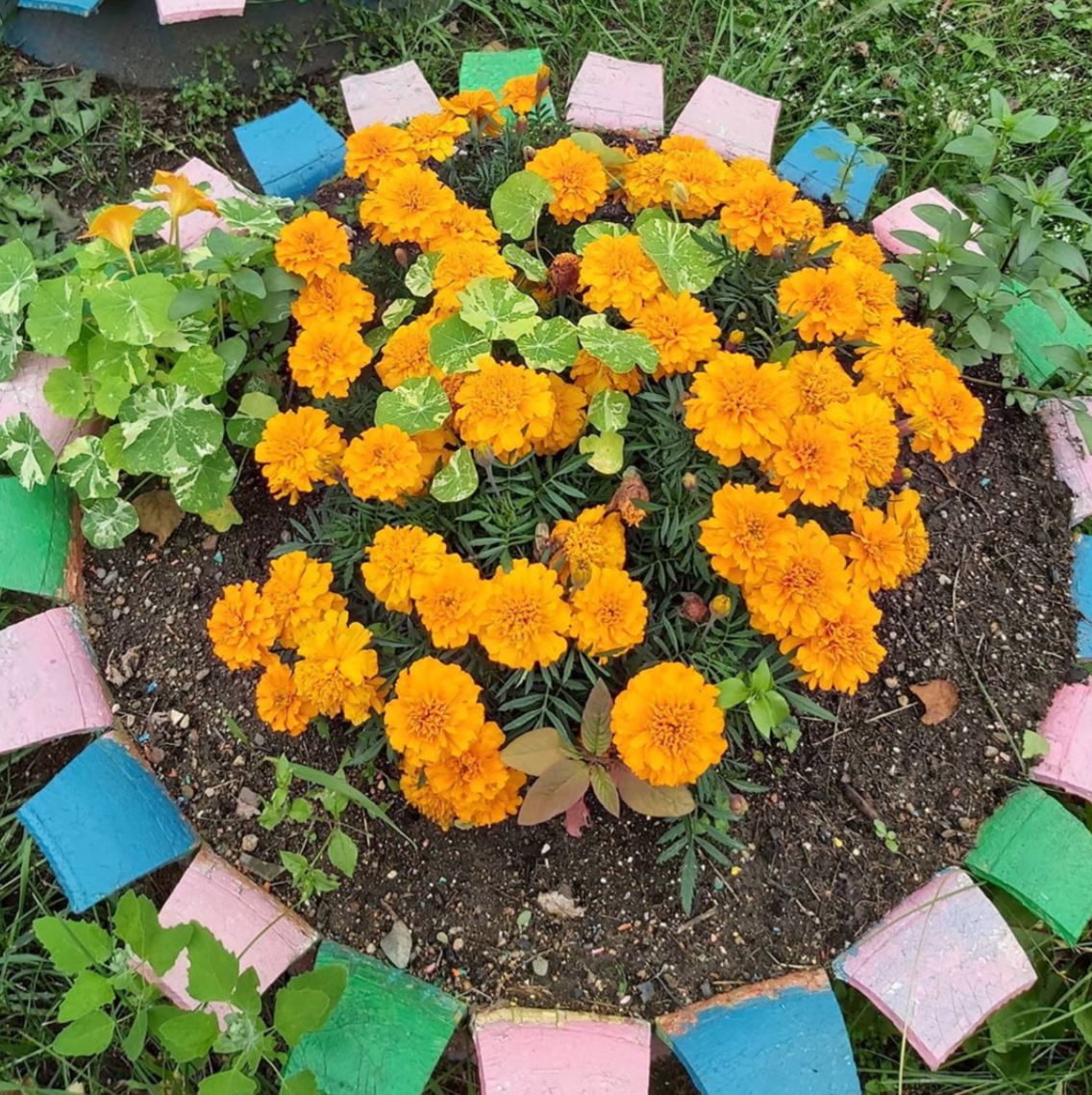
Flowering marigold plants (Eastern Siberia)
