= Tagetes argentina =

Scientific classification
- Kingdom: Plantae
- Clade: Tracheophytes
- Clade: Angiosperms
- Clade: Eudicots
- Clade: Asterids
- Order: Asterales
- Family: Asteraceae
- Genus: Tagetes
- Species: T. argentina

Binomial name
- Tagetes argentina Cabrera

Species of flowering plant

Tagetes argentina is a South American plant species in the family Asteraceae. It is found in Argentina and Bolivia on granitic and rhyolitic soils.

Tagetes argentina is an annual herb up to 30 cm tall. The foliage is generally dense, formed of pale green leaves which are narrowly pinnately dissected. The flower heads are white, and, although each head is 5 to 6 mm across, 5 to 25 heads together form showy flat-topped clusters. These clusters are on short peduncles which barely exceed the foliage, and since many branches often bloom at once, the entire plant is generally covered in a blaze of white. Achenes directly sown after the last frost grow to flowering in 8 to 12 weeks, and continue until killing frost. The mounding form is encouraged by early pinching of the young plants. The plants tend to naturally form low mounding shrubs to 30 cm tall. The foliage is generally dense, formed of pale green leaves which are narrowly pinnately dissected.

Tagetes argentina responds well to garden soils from acid to neutral. Sandy soils are preferred, but plants did tolerably well in the clay soils of central Texas. In conditions of full sunlight, rich soil, and ample moisture, it forms a compact, rounded plant. Flowering tapered off in the mid-summer as temperatures rose above 37 °C (99 °F), but resumed with cooler weather.
