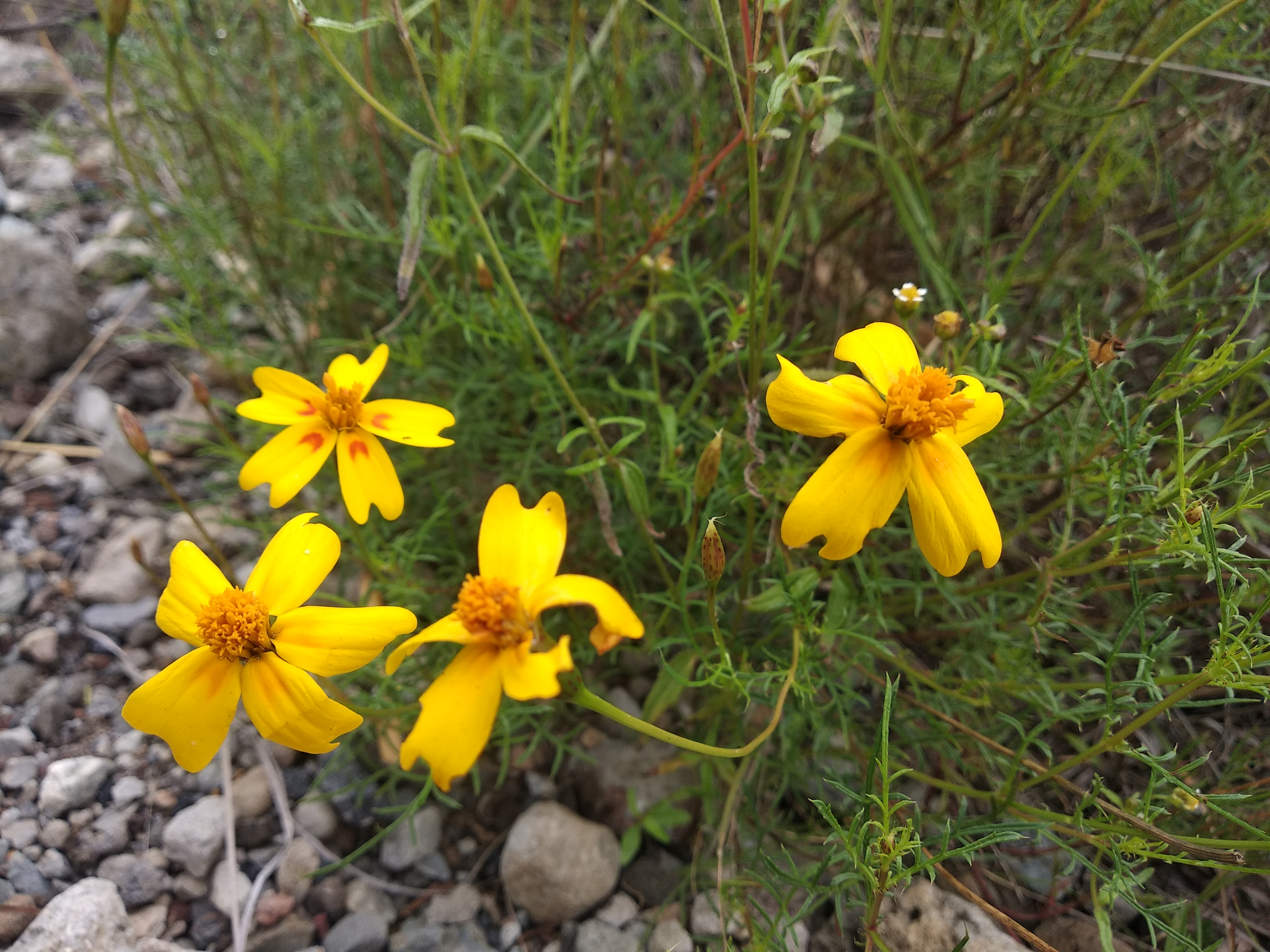

Scientific classification
- Kingdom: Plantae
- Clade: Tracheophytes
- Clade: Angiosperms
- Clade: Eudicots
- Clade: Asterids
- Order: Asterales
- Family: Asteraceae
- Genus: Tagetes
- Species: T. linifolia

Binomial name
- Tagetes linifolia Seaton

= Tagetes linifolia =

Species of flowering plant

Tagetes linifolia is a North American species of wild marigold in the family Asteraceae. It is native to the States of Tlaxcala, Veracruz, Oaxaca, and Puebla in Mexico.

Tagetes linifolia is an hairless herb about 30 cm (12 inches) tall. Leaves are pinnately compound with 7-11 leaflets. The plant produces one flower head per branch, each head with 5 yellow ray florets and 25-30 disc florets.
