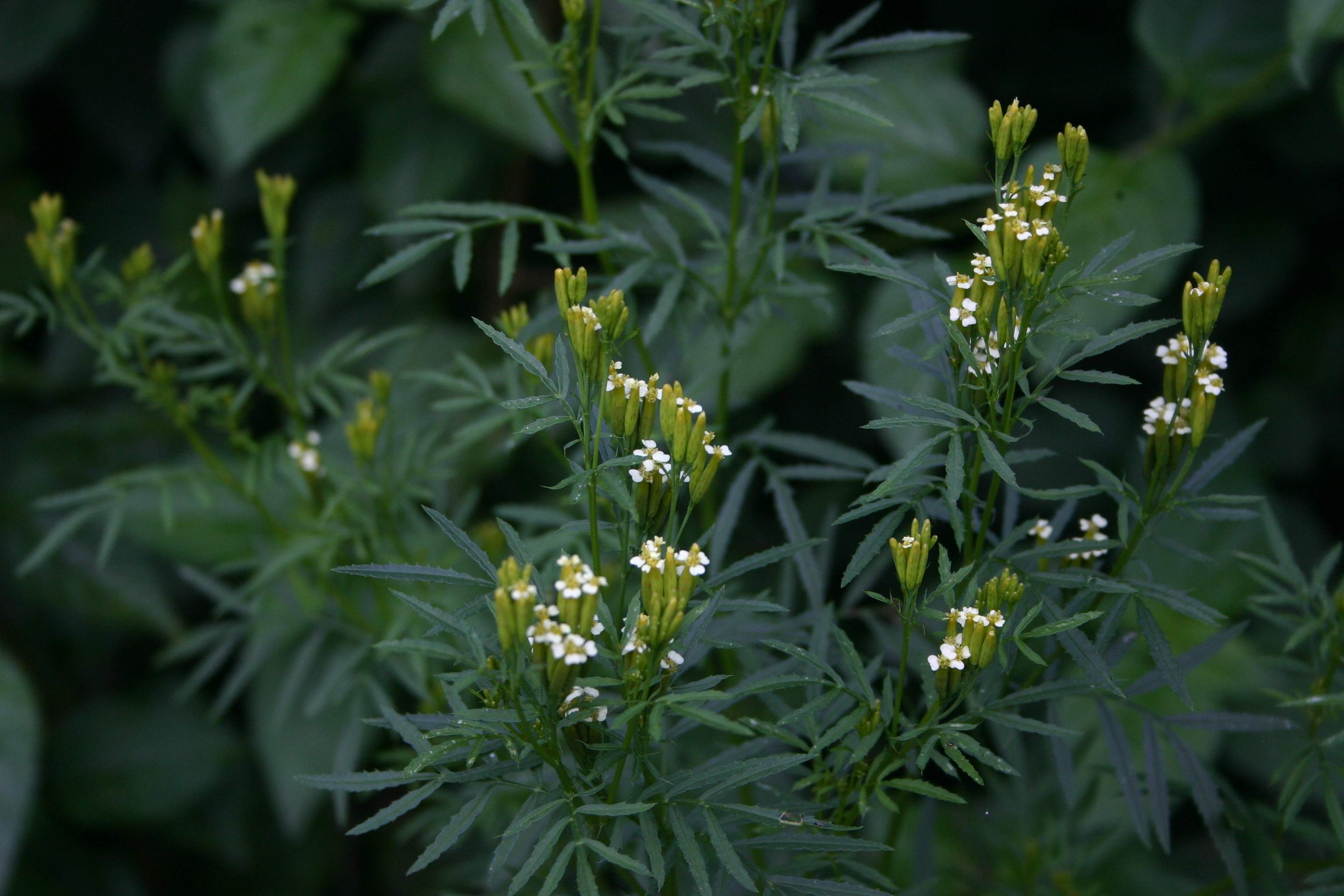

Scientific classification
- Kingdom: Plantae
- Clade: Tracheophytes
- Clade: Angiosperms
- Clade: Eudicots
- Clade: Asterids
- Order: Asterales
- Family: Asteraceae
- Genus: Tagetes
- Species: T. mendocina

Binomial name
- Tagetes mendocina Phil.

= Tagetes mendocina =

Species of plant

Tagetes mendocina is a perennial herb commonly used as a medicinal plant and herb when cooking. It belongs to the family Asteraceae and is found in the Cuyo region in western Argentina.

== Description ==
The blooms of Tagetes mendocina are white or yellow, relatively small in comparison to the rest of the species within the genus Tagetes. This perennial plant has fibrous roots and typically grows to about 2 m (6 ft 7 in) tall. The leaves are pinnately compound.

It is able to grow in many different soil types, though it grows best in areas with good drainage. It can tolerate drought to some extent.

== Distribution and habitat ==
The geographical region in which these species can be found is in Argentina, with in the Cuyo Regions which covers provinces of Mendoza, San Juan, and the Occidental side of San Luis. It consists of diverse regions including high mountain ranges, valley, and desert climate. Its common name in Spanish is Chilchil del Cerro this could be related to the fact that Chili is west of the Cuyo Regions. “Del Cerro” translates to hills which relates to the diverse mountain ranges. This desert experiences a wide range of temperatures throughout the year, and dry year-round. Cold seasons cause T.mendocina to go into a vegetative state and flourish during warm season. However, like most plants they will not grow in extremely hot temperatures. According to JSTOR Global plants this species has been found in Mendoza providence. The average temperature in this region can range from 37°F-85°F: rarely below 30°F or above 96°F.

== Invasive species ==
In some areas this may be considered an invasive species but in most it is not. This species is closely related to Tagetes minuta which is considered a noxious invasive plant in some areas.

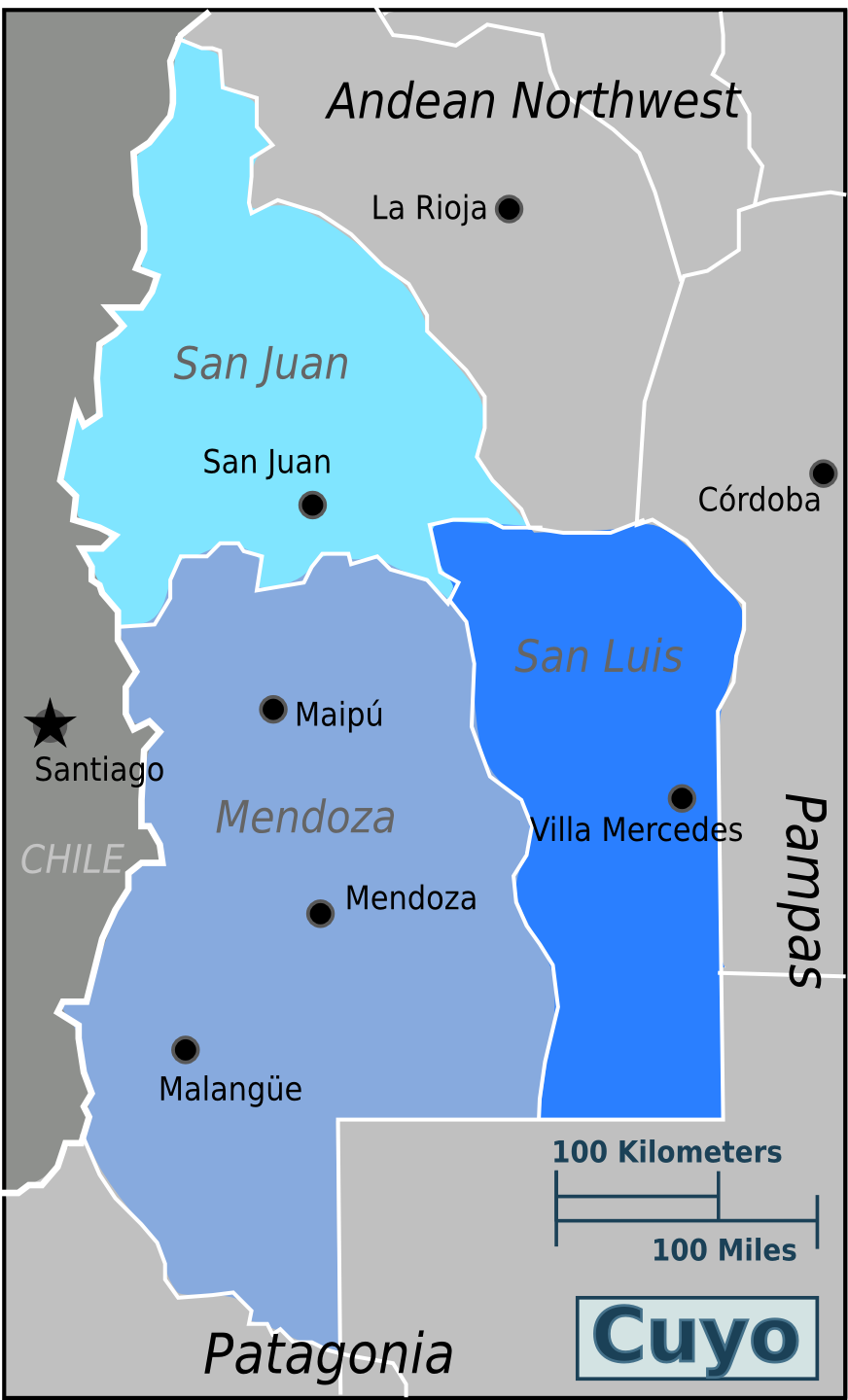
Location of Cuyo Region in Argentina: Mendoza, San Luis, and San Juan
