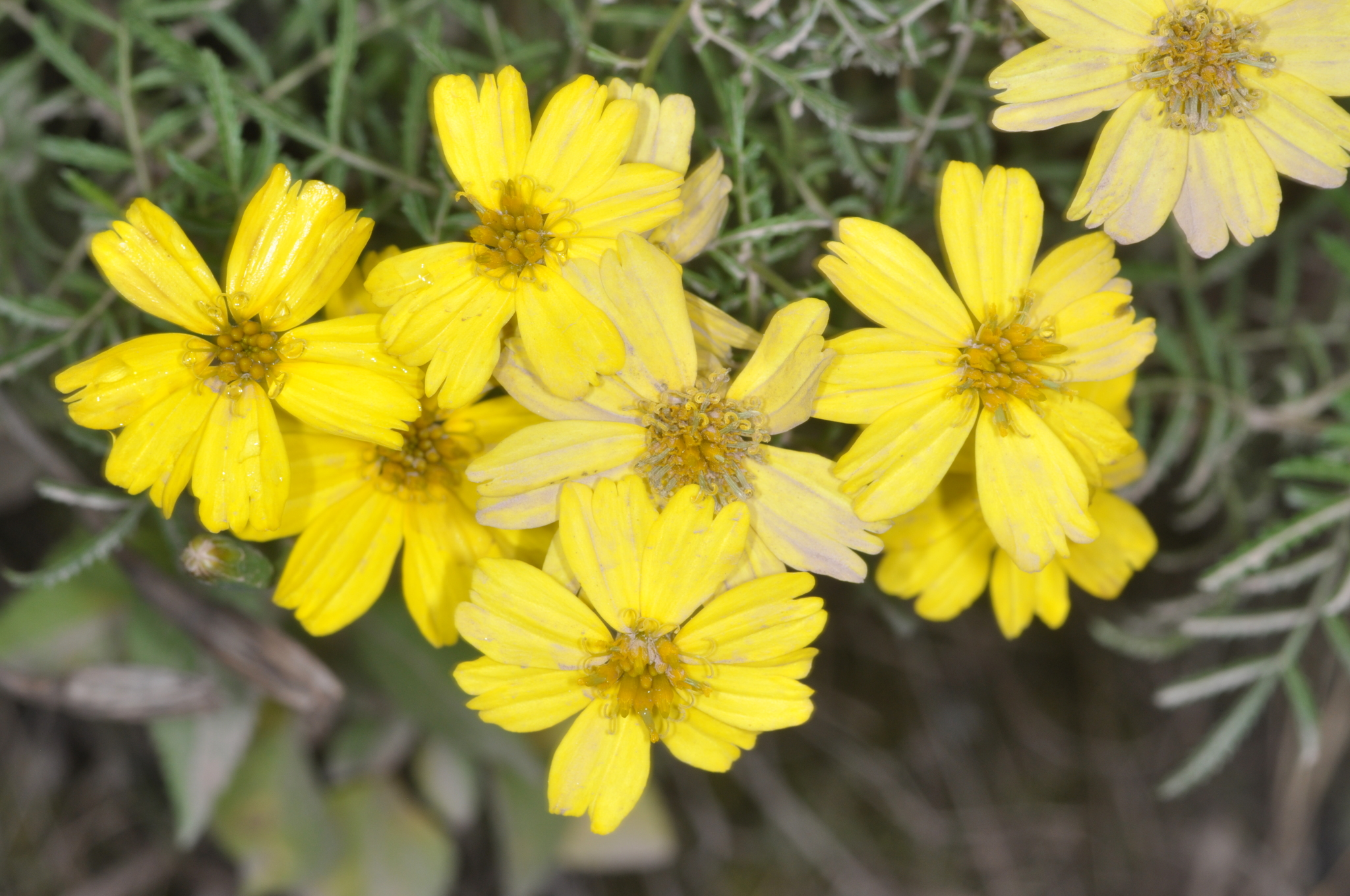

Scientific classification
- Kingdom: Plantae
- Clade: Tracheophytes
- Clade: Angiosperms
- Clade: Eudicots
- Clade: Asterids
- Order: Asterales
- Family: Asteraceae
- Genus: Tagetes
- Species: T. campanulata

Binomial name
- Tagetes campanulata Griseb. 1874

= Tagetes campanulata =

Species of plant

Tagetes campanulata is a South American species of plants in the family Asteraceae. It is found in Argentina (Provinces of Catamarca, Jujuy, La Rioja) and Bolivia (Tarija Department).
