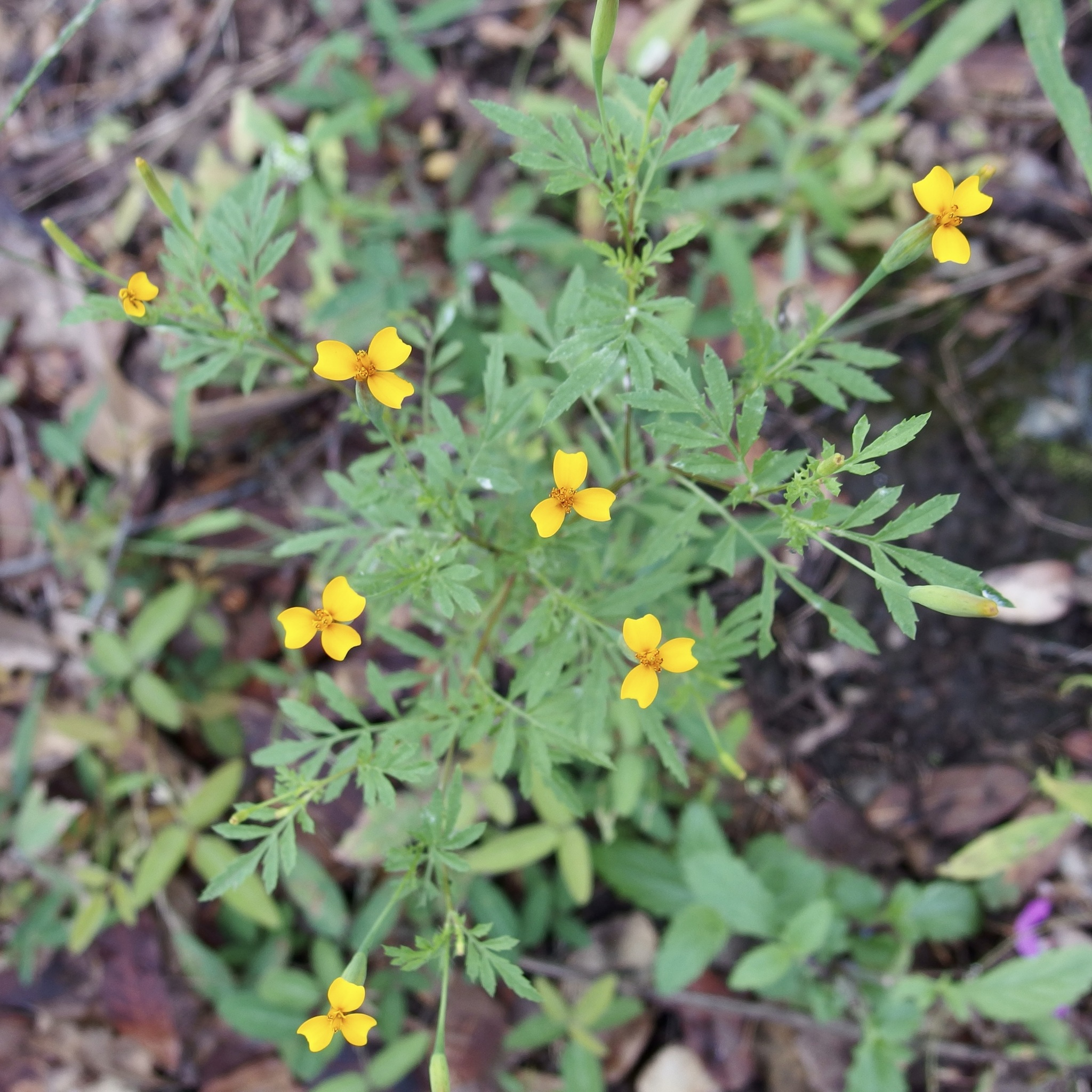

Scientific classification
- Kingdom: Plantae
- Clade: Tracheophytes
- Clade: Angiosperms
- Clade: Eudicots
- Clade: Asterids
- Order: Asterales
- Family: Asteraceae
- Genus: Tagetes
- Species: T. triradiata

Binomial name
- Tagetes triradiata Greenm.

Synonyms
- Tagetes jaliscensis Greenm.

= Tagetes triradiata =

Species of flowering plant

Tagetes triradiata is a Mexican species of marigold in the family Asteraceae. It is native to central Mexico (Puebla, Morelos, México State, D.F., Veracruz).

Tagetes triradiata is an hairless annual herb up to 50 cm (20 inches) tall. Leaves are pinnately compound with 15-21 leaflets. One plant produces numerous small flower heads in a flat-topped array, each containing 3 bright yellow ray florets surrounding several yellow disc florets.
