= Tagetes laxa =

Scientific classification
- Kingdom: Plantae
- Clade: Tracheophytes
- Clade: Angiosperms
- Clade: Eudicots
- Clade: Asterids
- Order: Asterales
- Family: Asteraceae
- Genus: Tagetes
- Species: T. laxa

Binomial name
- Tagetes laxa Cabrera

Species of flowering plant

Tagetes laxa is a South American species of marigolds in the family Asteraceae. It is native to Bolivia and northern Argentina (Jujuy, Salta, Tucumán).
