= Tagetes pusilla =

Scientific classification
- Kingdom: Plantae
- Clade: Tracheophytes
- Clade: Angiosperms
- Clade: Eudicots
- Clade: Asterids
- Order: Asterales
- Family: Asteraceae
- Genus: Tagetes
- Species: T. pusilla

Binomial name
- Tagetes pusilla Kunth

Species of flowering plant

Tagetes pusilla, the lesser marigold, is a Latin American species of marigolds in the family Asteraceae. It is native Central America and western South America from Guatemala to northern Argentina.

Tagetes pusilla is a small annual herb rarely more than 10 cm (4 inches) tall. Leaves are deeply dissected, the leaflets reduced to threads. One plant a few small flower heads, each containing 1-3 white ray florets surrounding 8-10 disc florets.
