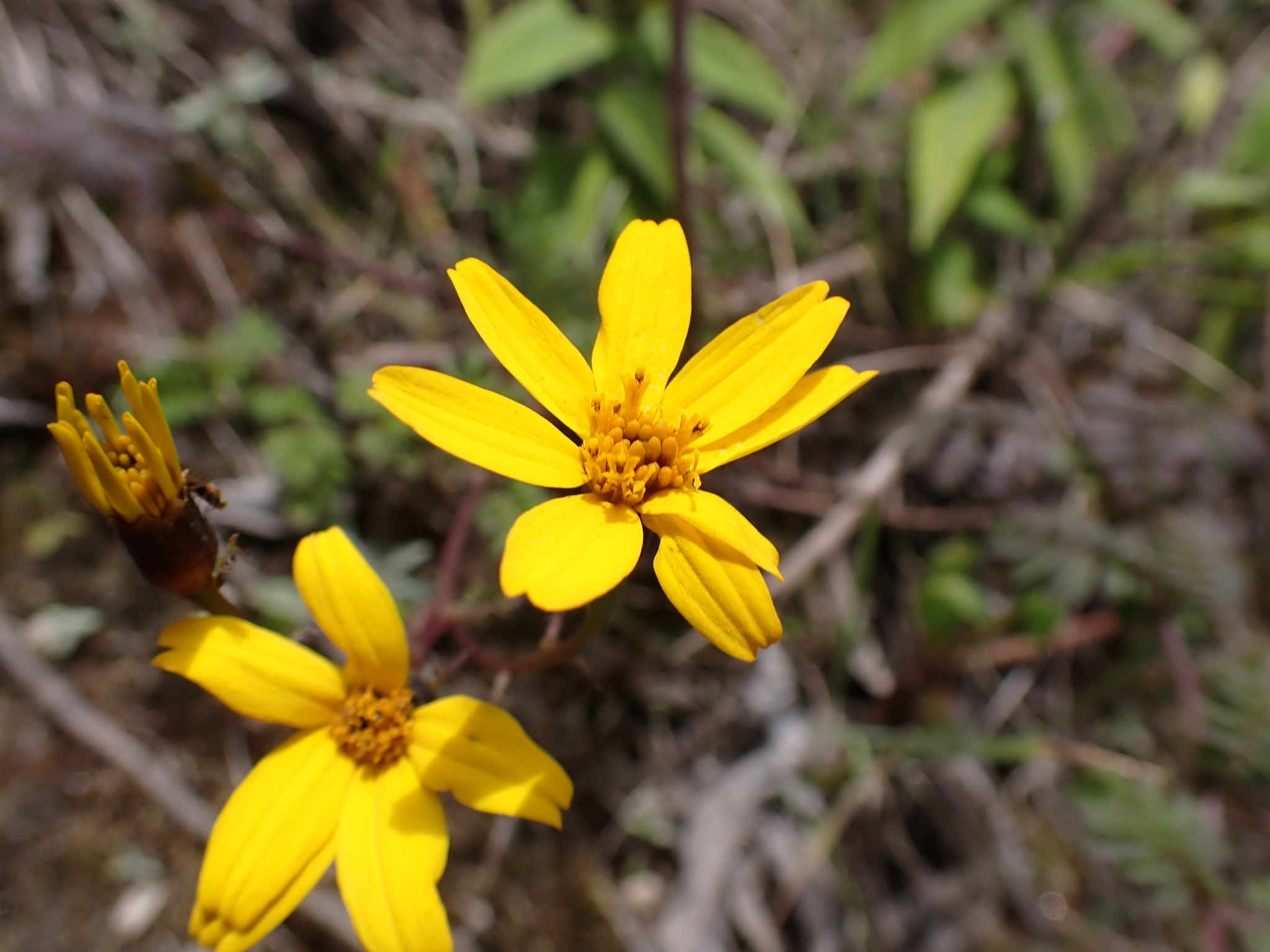

Scientific classification
- Kingdom: Plantae
- Clade: Tracheophytes
- Clade: Angiosperms
- Clade: Eudicots
- Clade: Asterids
- Order: Asterales
- Family: Asteraceae
- Genus: Tagetes
- Species: T. zypaquirensis

Binomial name
- Tagetes zypaquirensis Bonpl. 1808

= Tagetes zypaquirensis =

Species of flowering plant

Tagetes zypaquirensis is a Latin American species of marigold in the family Asteraceae. It has been found in Central America, Colombia, and Ecuador.

Tagetes zypaquirensis is an annual herb up to 100 cm (40 inches) tall. Leaves are pinnately compound with toothed leaflets. The plant produces numerous flower heads in flat-topped arrays, yellow, each head containing ray florets surrounding disc florets.

The species is named for the community of Zypaquirá in Nueva Granada (present-day Zipaquirá, Colombia).
