= Tagetes subvillosa =

Scientific classification
- Kingdom: Plantae
- Clade: Tracheophytes
- Clade: Angiosperms
- Clade: Eudicots
- Clade: Asterids
- Order: Asterales
- Family: Asteraceae
- Genus: Tagetes
- Species: T. subvillosa

Binomial name
- Tagetes subvillosa Lag.

Species of flowering plant

Tagetes subvillosa is a Mexican species of marigold in the family Asteraceae. It has been found only in southern Mexico.

Tagetes subvillosa is a branching annual herb up to 60 cm (2 feet) tall. Leaves are pinnately compound up to 6 cm (2.4 inches) long. The plant will produce several flower heads in a flat-topped array, orange, each head containing ray florets surrounding numerous disc florets.
