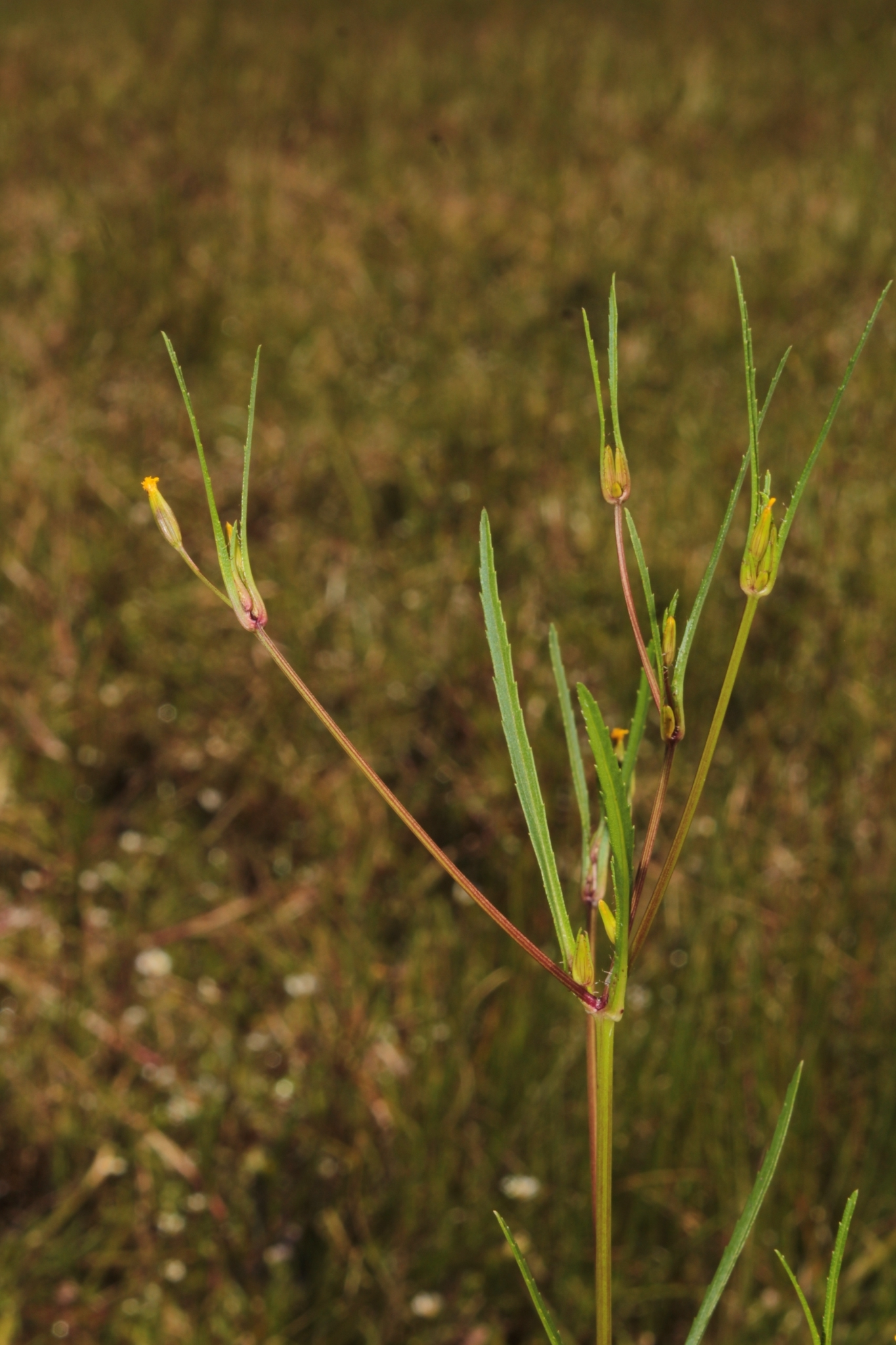

Scientific classification
- Kingdom: Plantae
- Clade: Tracheophytes
- Clade: Angiosperms
- Clade: Eudicots
- Clade: Asterids
- Order: Asterales
- Family: Asteraceae
- Genus: Tagetes
- Species: T. epapposa

Binomial name
- Tagetes epapposa B.L. Turner 1988

= Tagetes epapposa =

Species of aquatic plant

Tagetes epapposa is a species of plant in the family Asteraceae. It has been found only in the State of Durango in northern Mexico.

Tagetes epapposa is an erect aquatic annual plant up to 35 cm (14 inches) tall. Leaves are long and slender, up to 6 cm (2.4 inches) long. Ray florets are much reduced, yellow, only 1 or 2 per head, each only about 1 mm (0.04 inches) long. Disc florets are also yellow, 6-8 per head. The plant grows in shallow standing water at high elevation (circa 8000 feet or 2400 meters) in the Sierra Madre Occidental.
