= Tagetes elongata =

Scientific classification
- Kingdom: Plantae
- Clade: Tracheophytes
- Clade: Angiosperms
- Clade: Eudicots
- Clade: Asterids
- Order: Asterales
- Family: Asteraceae
- Genus: Tagetes
- Species: T. elongata

Binomial name
- Tagetes elongata Willd. 1803

Species of flowering plant

Tagetes elongata is a Latin American species of marigolds in the family Asteraceae. It has been found in central and southern Mexico from San Luis Potosí and Zacatecas south to Chiapas.

Tagetes elongata is an annual herb up to 60 cm (2 feet) tall. Leaves are pinnately compound with 9-17 toothed leaflets. The plant produces numerous flower heads in flat-topped arrays, yellow, each head containing ray florets surrounding disc florets.
