= Tagetes stenophylla =

Scientific classification
- Kingdom: Plantae
- Clade: Tracheophytes
- Clade: Angiosperms
- Clade: Eudicots
- Clade: Asterids
- Order: Asterales
- Family: Asteraceae
- Genus: Tagetes
- Species: T. stenophylla

Binomial name
- Tagetes stenophylla B.L.Rob. 1907

Species of flowering plant

Tagetes stenophylla is a Mexican species of marigold in the family Asteraceae. It has been found in the States of Guerrero, Jalisco, Morelos, Michoacán, and México State in western and central Mexico.

Tagetes stenophylla is a hairless, branching perennial herb up to 100 cm (40 inches) tall. Leaves are highly divided, up to 4 cm (1.6 inches) long, the leaves high on the stem reduced to branching threads. The plant one flower head per flower stalk, are yellow, each head containing 5 ray florets surrounding numerous disc florets.
