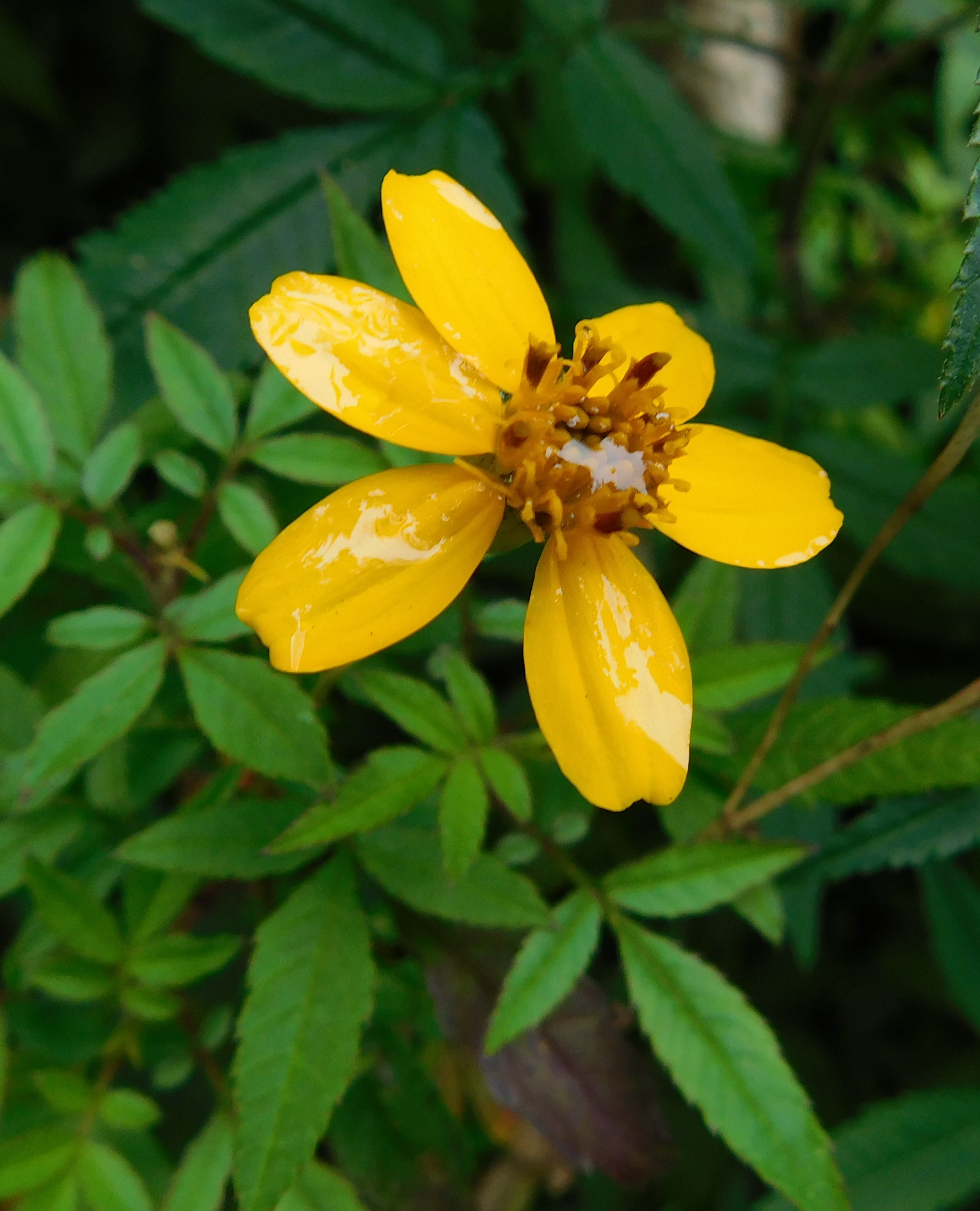

Scientific classification
- Kingdom: Plantae
- Clade: Tracheophytes
- Clade: Angiosperms
- Clade: Eudicots
- Clade: Asterids
- Order: Asterales
- Family: Asteraceae
- Genus: Tagetes
- Species: T. nelsonii

Binomial name
- Tagetes nelsonii Greenm. 1903

Synonyms
- Tagetes sororia Standl. & Steyerm.

= Tagetes nelsonii =

Species of flowering plant

Tagetes nelsonii is a Mexican species of marigold in the family Asteraceae. It is native to Guatemala and to the State of Chiapas in southern Mexico.

Tagetes nelsonii is a hairless annual herb from 50 cm (20 inches) to 2m (6 feet) tall. Leaves are pinnately compound with 3-7 leaflets. The plant produces numerous small flower heads in a flat-topped array, each containing 5-6 yellow ray florets surrounding 9-12 greenish-yellow disc florets. Also known as the citrus scented marigold, 'Tagetes nelsonii is considered an edible flower and is often eaten raw.
