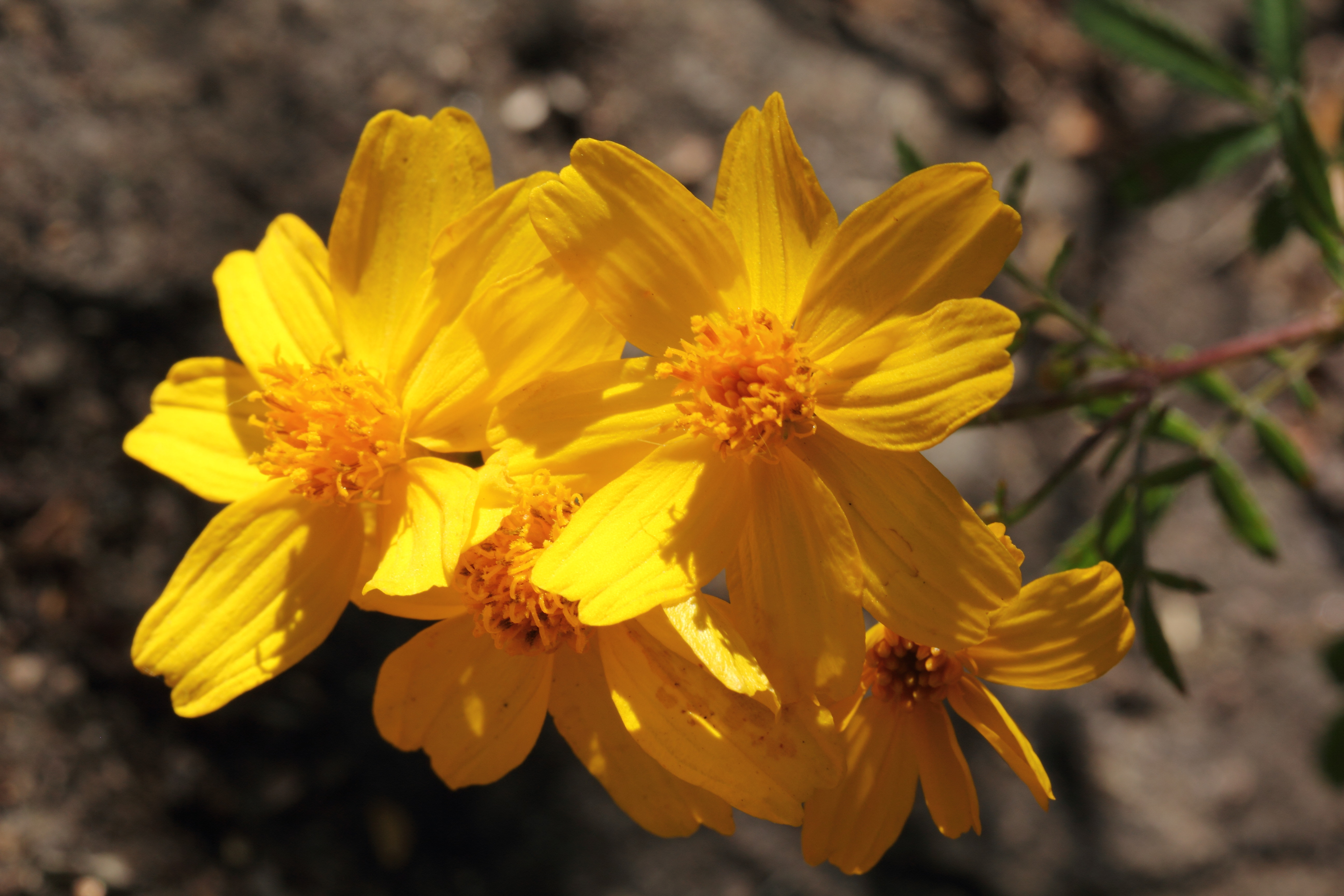
- Tagetes lemmonii flowers

Scientific classification
- Kingdom: Plantae
- Clade: Embryophytes
- Clade: Tracheophytes
- Clade: Spermatophytes
- Clade: Angiosperms
- Clade: Eudicots
- Clade: Asterids
- Order: Asterales
- Family: Asteraceae
- Genus: Tagetes
- Species: T. lemmonii

Binomial name
- Tagetes lemmonii A.Gray

= Tagetes lemmonii =

Species of shrub

Tagetes lemmonii, or Lemmon's marigold, is a North American species of shrubby marigold, in the family Asteraceae. Other English names for this plant include Copper Canyon daisy, mountain marigold, Mexican marigold, and Passionfruit Marigold.

It is native to the states of Sonora and Sinaloa in northwestern Mexico as well as southern Arizona in the United States.

== Description ==
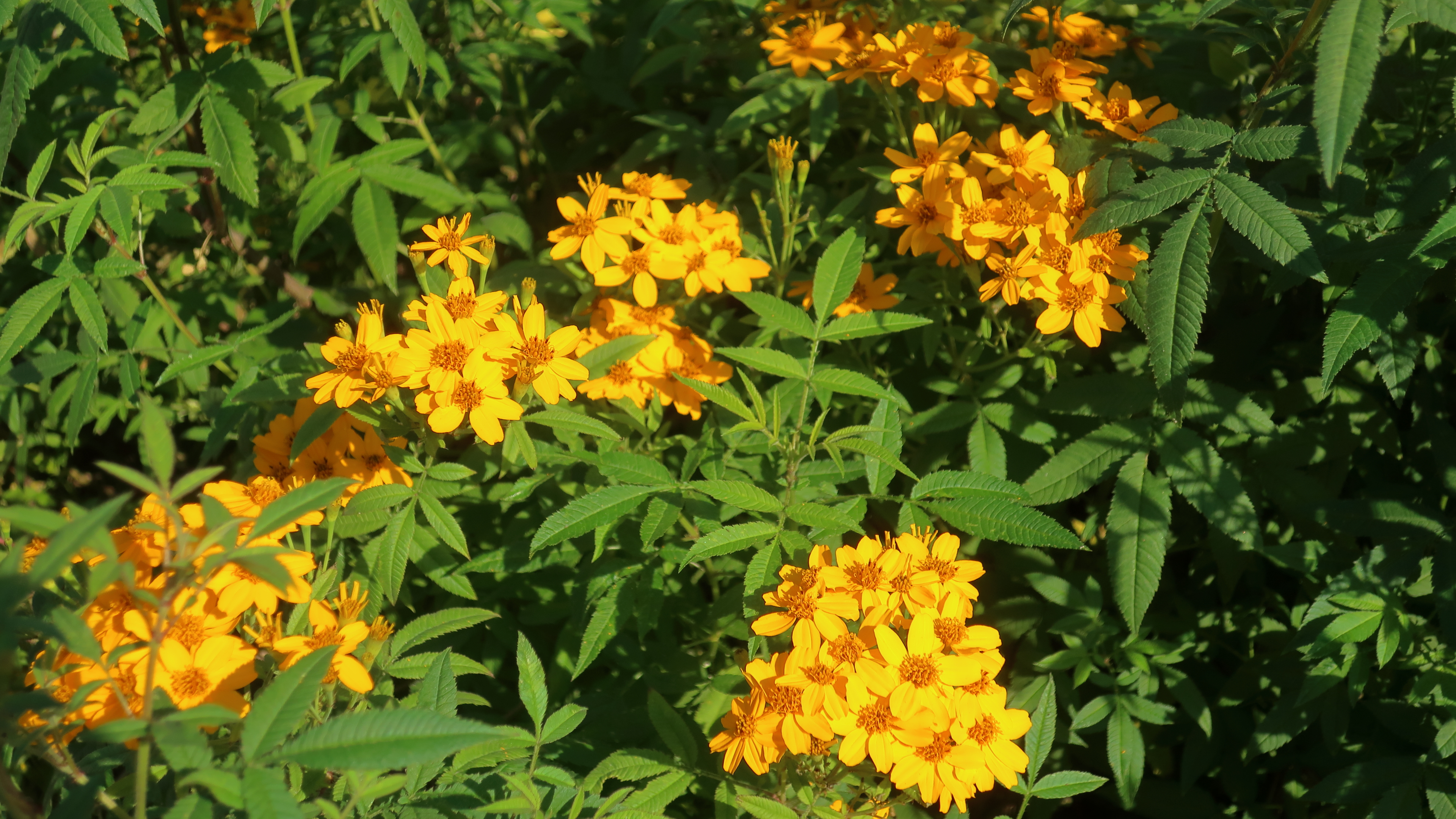
Flowers and leaves

Tagetes lemmonii is a shrub sometimes reaching as much as 240 cm (8 feet) tall.

Leaves are up to 12 cm (4.8 inches) long, pinnately compound into 3-5 leaflets, each leaflet narrowly lance-shaped with teeth along the edge.

=== Inflorescences ===
The plant produces many small flower heads in a flat-topped array, each head with 3-8 ray florets and 12-30 disc florets. It grows in woodlands, cliffs, and moist sites.

== Taxonomy ==
The species is named for John Gill Lemmon, husband of American botanist Sarah Plummer Lemmon.

== Cultivation ==
Tagetes lemmonii blooms from fall into spring and can sometimes be blooming for up to 10 months. It can get up to 8 feet tall by across. The foliage is pungent when disturbed. The species is very drought tolerant in a Mediterranean climate and much used in California gardens where it tolerates light frosts without damage.
