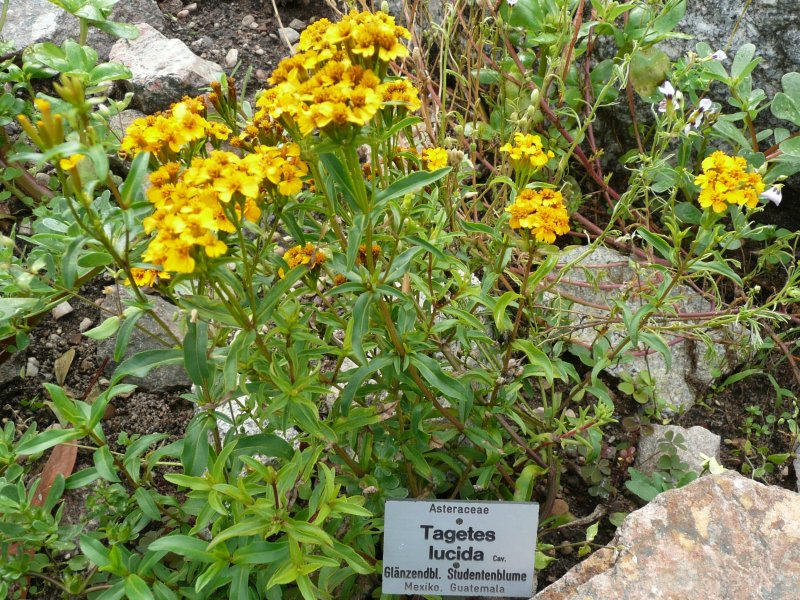

Scientific classification
- Kingdom: Plantae
- Clade: Tracheophytes
- Clade: Angiosperms
- Clade: Eudicots
- Clade: Asterids
- Order: Asterales
- Family: Asteraceae
- Genus: Tagetes
- Species: T. subulata

Binomial name
- Tagetes subulata Cerv.

Synonyms
- Tagetes multiseta DC.; Tagetes wislizeni A.Gray

= Tagetes subulata =

Species of flowering plant

Tagetes subulata is an herbaceous plant of the family Asteraceae. It is widespread across most of Mexico, and found also in Central America, Colombia, and Venezuela. It has highly divided bright green leaves and yellow flowers contained in an elongated calyx.
