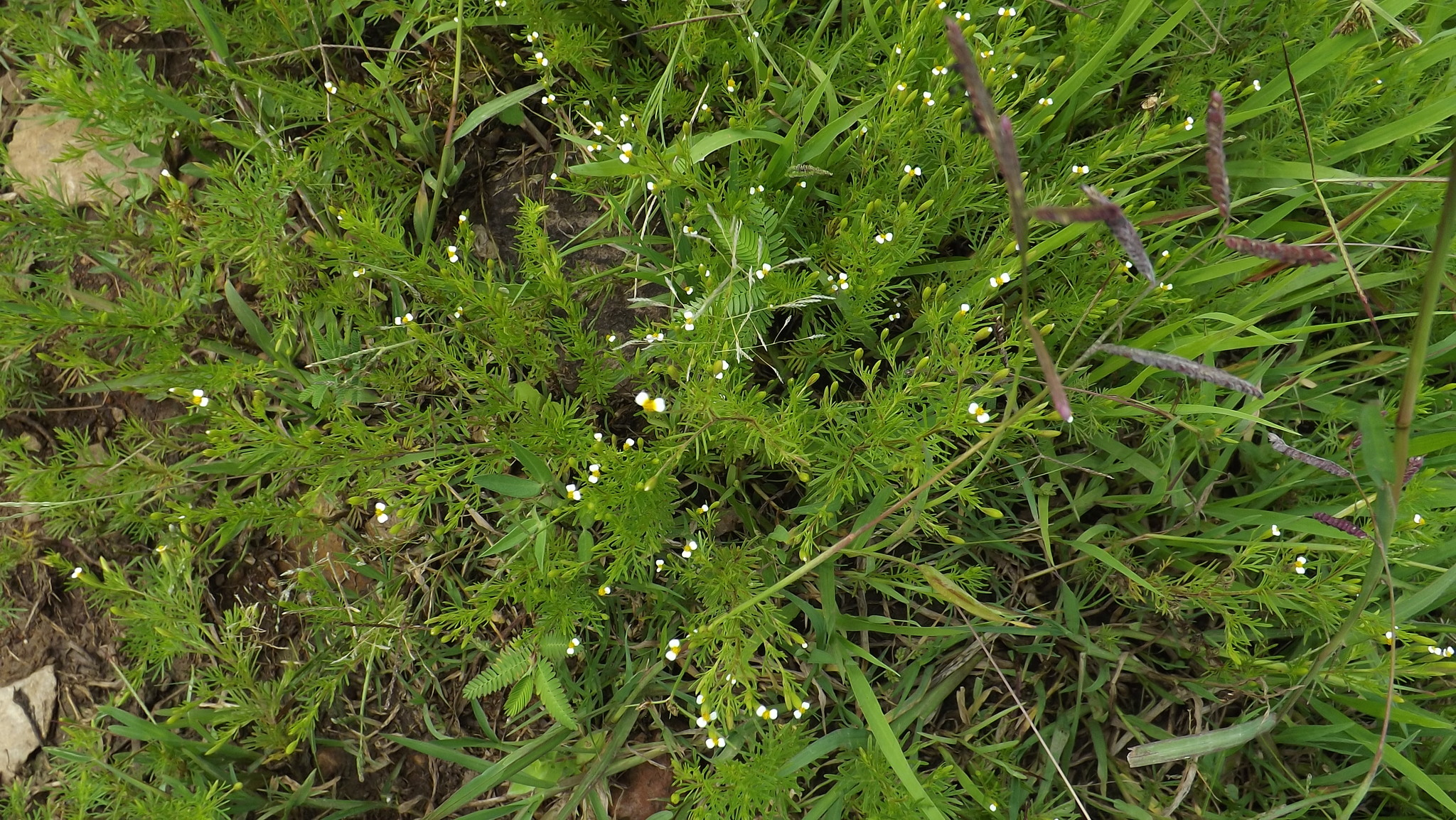

Scientific classification
- Kingdom: Plantae
- Clade: Tracheophytes
- Clade: Angiosperms
- Clade: Eudicots
- Clade: Asterids
- Order: Asterales
- Family: Asteraceae
- Genus: Tagetes
- Species: T. filifolia

Binomial name
- Tagetes filifolia Lag. 1816

Synonyms
- Synonymy: Diglossus variabilis Cass.; Enalcida foeniculifolia Cass.; Enalcida pilifera Cass.; Tagetes anisata Lillo; Tagetes dichotoma Turcz.; Tagetes foeniculacea Poepp. ex DC. 1836 not Desf. 1829; Tagetes pauciloba DC.; Tagetes perretii nob. ex Colla; Tagetes pseudomicrantha Lillo; Tagetes scabra Brandegee; Tagetes silenoides Meyen & Walp.; Tagetes tanacetifolia Schrad.

= Tagetes filifolia =

Species of flowering plant

Tagetes filifolia is a New World species of marigolds in the family Asteraceae. It is widespread across much of Latin America from northern Mexico to Argentina. Common name is Irish lace despite the fact that the plant does not grow in Ireland.

Tagetes filifolia is a branching annual herb up to 50 cm (20 inches) tall. It has a strong aroma similar to that of anise or liquorice. Leaves resemble small branching, feathery threads.

People of the native range of the species use it as a food flavoring, a tea, and a diuretic.
