= Aimé Bonpland =

French explorer and botanist (1773-1858)

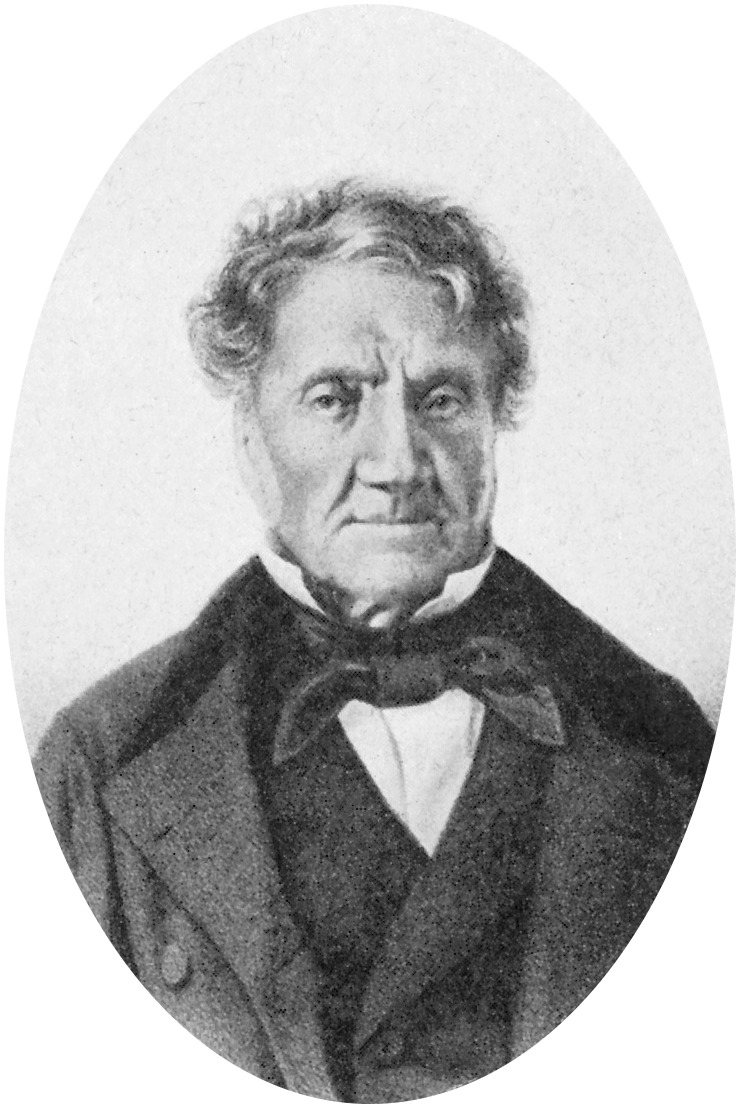
- Born: 22 August 1773; La Rochelle, France
- Died: 11 May 1858 (aged 84); Paso de los Libres, Argentina
- Burial place: Cemetery of the Holy Cross of Paso de los Libres
- Citizenship: French
- Education: University of Paris
- Known for: Travel with Alexander von Humboldt
- Parent(s): Jacques-Simon Goujaud; Marguerite-Olive de La Coste
- Scientific career
- Fields: Physician, biologist, botanist, natural history
- Author abbrev. (botany): Bonpl.

Aimé Jacques Alexandre Bonpland (French: [ɛme bɔ̃plɑ̃]; 22 August 1773 – 11 May 1858) was a French explorer and botanist who traveled with Alexander von Humboldt in Latin America from 1799 to 1804. He co-authored volumes of the scientific results of their expedition.

The standard author abbreviation Bonpl. is used to indicate this person as the author when citing a botanical name.

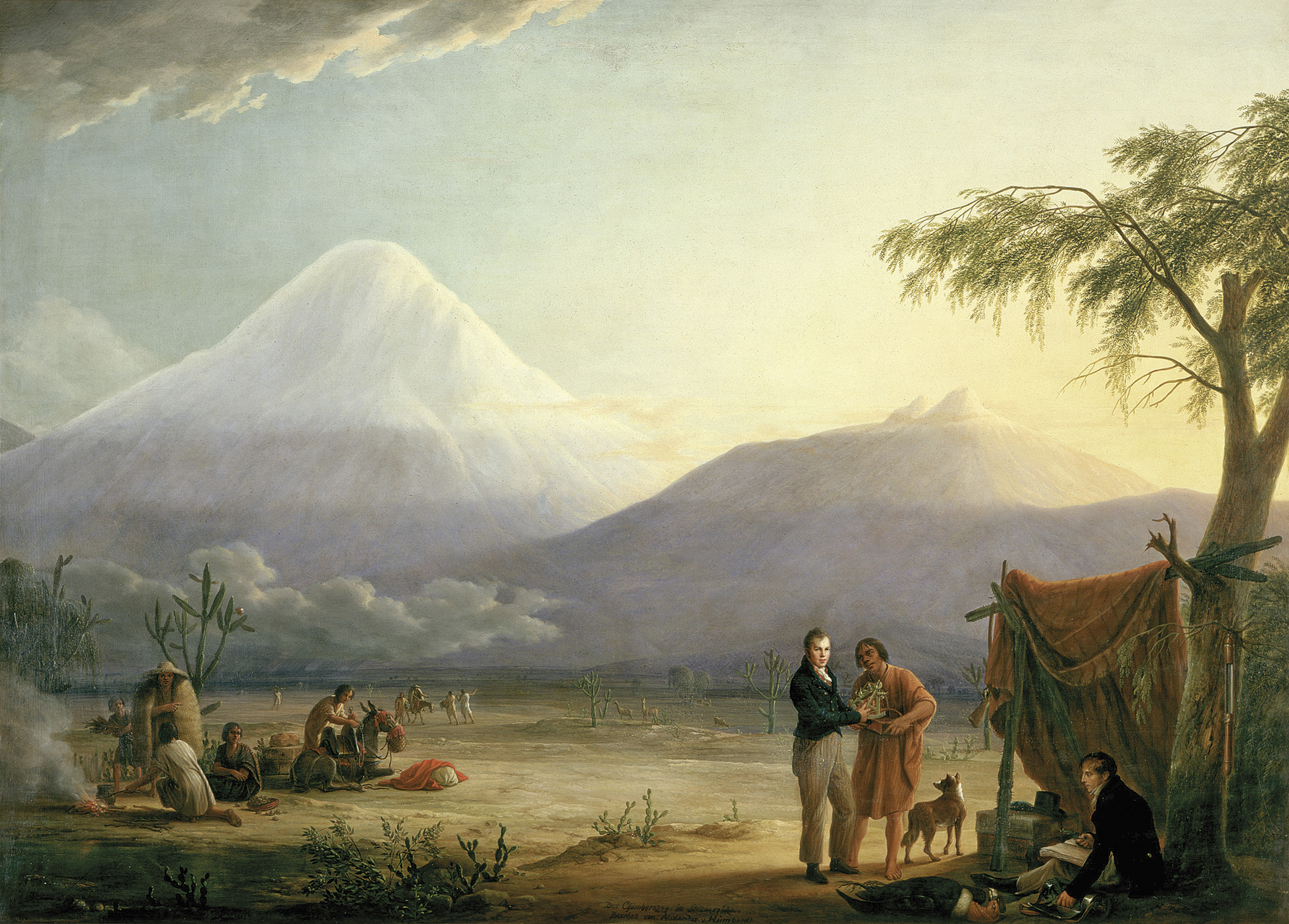
Humboldt and Bonpland at the Chimborazo base

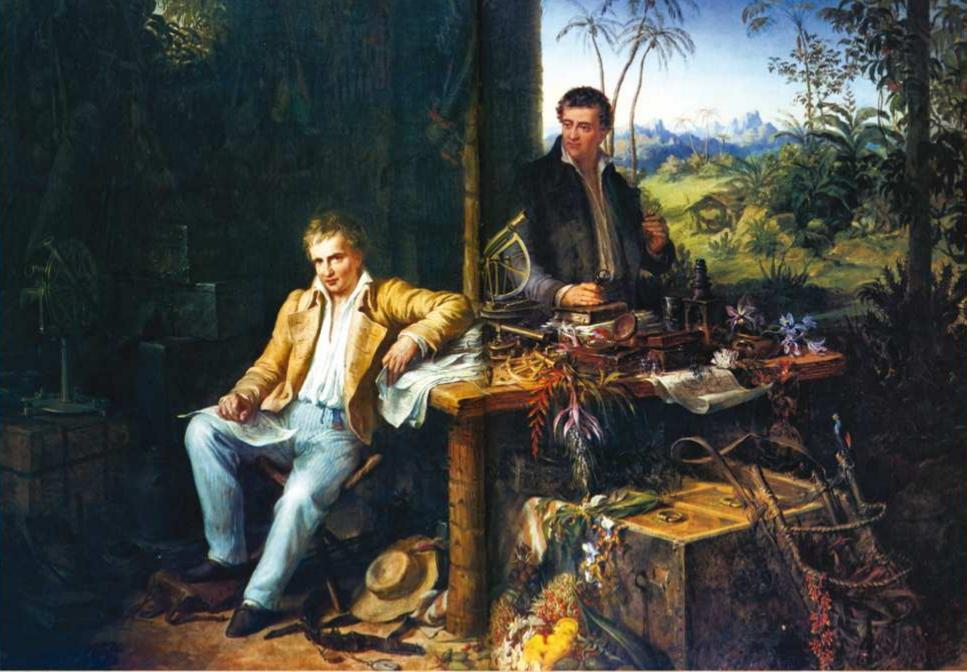
Humboldt and Bonpland in the Amazon rainforest

== Biography ==
Bonpland was born as Aimé Jacques Alexandre Goujaud in La Rochelle, France, on 22, 28, or 29 August 1773. His father was a physician and, around 1790, he joined his brother Michael in Paris, where they both studied medicine. From 1791, they attended courses given at Paris's Botanical Museum of Natural History. Their teachers included Jean-Baptiste Lamarck, Antoine Laurent de Jussieu, and René Louiche Desfontaines; Aimé further studied under Jean-Nicolas Corvisart and may have attended classes given by Pierre-Joseph Desault at the Hôtel-Dieu. During this period, Aimé also befriended his fellow student, Xavier Bichat.

Amid the turmoil of the French Revolution and Revolutionary Wars, Bonpland served as a surgeon in the French army or navy.

Having befriended Alexander von Humboldt at Corvisart's house, he joined him on a five-year journey to Tenerife and the Spanish colonial empire in the Americas, traveling to what later became the independent states of Venezuela, Cuba, Colombia, Ecuador, Peru, and Mexico, as well as the Orinoco and Amazon basins, with a last stop in the United States. As part of the exploration, in 1802 he climbed the highest mountain in Ecuador, the extinct volcano Chimborazo, to a height of 19,286 feet, at the time a world record altitude for a Westerner. During this trip, he collected and classified about 6,000 plants that were mostly unknown in Europe up to that time. His account of these findings was published as a series of volumes from 1808 to 1816 entitled Equatorial Plants (French: Plantes equinoxiales).

Upon his return to Paris, Napoleon granted him a pension of 3000 francs per year in return for the many specimens he bestowed upon the Museum of Natural History. The Empress Josephine was very fond of him and installed him as superintendent over the gardens at Malmaison, where many seeds he had brought from the Americas were cultivated. In 1813, he published his Description of the Rare Plants Cultivated at Malmaison and in Navarre (Description des plantes rares cultivées à Malmaison et à Navarre). During this period, he also became acquainted with Gay-Lussac, Arago, and other eminent scientists and, after the abdication of Fontainebleau, vainly pleaded with Napoleon to retire to Venezuela. He was present at Josephine's deathbed.

In 1816, he took various European plants to Buenos Aires, where he was elected professor of natural history. He soon left his post, however, to explore the interior of South America. In 1821, he established a colony at Santa Ana near the Paraná for the specific object of harvesting and selling yerba mate. The colony was located in territory claimed by both Paraguay and Argentina; further, José Gaspar Rodríguez de Francia, dictator of Paraguay, "feared that Bonpland's success in cultivating mate would interfere with his own attempt to monopolize that business." The Paraguayans therefore destroyed the colony on December 8, 1821, and Bonpland was arrested as a spy and detained at Santa Maria, Paraguay until 1829. Simón Bolívar wrote to the dictator to try to obtain his release, but to no avail. However, the conditions of his imprisonment appear to have been relatively enlightened. During his captivity, he married and had several children. He was given freedom of movement and acted as a physician for the local poor and the military garrison. At the same epoch, the Swiss naturalist Johann Rudolph Rengger also stayed in Paraguay: he was not allowed to cross the strictly guarded border, but was free to circulate pending the request of a special permit for each excursion.

Bonpland was freed in 1829 and in 1831 returned to Argentina, where he settled at San Borja in Corrientes. There, aged 58, he married a local woman and made a living farming and trading in yerba mate. In 1853, he returned to Santa Ana, where he cultivated the orange trees he had introduced. He received a 10 000-piastre estate from the Corrientes government in gratitude for his work in the province. The small town around it is now known as "Bonpland" in his honor. A different small town in Misiones province just south of Santa Ana (Misiones) is also named Bonpland.

He died at age 84, at San Borja, Santa Ana, or Restauracion, Argentina on 4 or 11 May 1858, before his planned return to Paris. He is buried in the Cemetery of the Holy Cross in Paso de los Libres

== Legacy ==
His collection of plant specimens deposited in Paris at the National Museum of Natural History, France was curated by Alicia Lourteig.

Bonpland's biography was written by Adolphe Brunel. A fictionalized account of his travels with Humboldt occurs in Daniel Kehlmann's Die Vermessung der Welt, translated by Carol Brown Janeway as Measuring the World: A Novel.

Bonpland Street in the upscale Buenos Aires neighborhood of Palermo Hollywood lies among streets named after Charles Darwin, Robert FitzRoy, and Alexander von Humboldt. There is also a Bonpland Street in the city of Bahía Blanca, Argentina, in Caracas, Venezuela, and in Montevideo, Uruguay.

Many animals and plants are also named in his honor, including the plant genus Bonplandia, the willow Salix bonplandiana, the squid Grimalditeuthis bonplandi, and the orchid Ornithocephalus bonplandi.

The lunar crater Bonpland is named after him. Also Pico Bonpland in the Venezuelan Andes is named to his honor, although he never visited the Venezuelan Andes. Mount Bonpland 2,343 m (7,687 ft) in New Zealand also bears his name. The mountain is near the head of Lake Wakatipu in the South Island.

The Bonpland Prize set up by the National Horticultural Society of France to promote the creation or restoration of pleasure gardens by amateur gardeners, was named after Aimé Bonpland.

== Taxonomic descriptions ==
The following genera and species have been named or described by Aimé Bonpland.

=== Genera ===
1. Abolboda
2. Aegopogon
3. Alchornea
4. Angelonia
5. Ceroxylon
6. Elionurus
7. Eriope
8. Espeletia
9. Eudema
10. Exostema
11. Fulcaldea
12. Guardiola
13. Hypocalyptus
14. Isertia
15. Leucophyllum
16. Limnocharis
17. Machaonia
18. Matisia
19. Menodora
20. Pleopeltis
21. Retiniphyllum
22. Triglochin
23. Vauquelinia

=== Species ===
1. Acacia subulata
2. Alchornea castaneifolia
3. Arceuthobium vaginatum
4. Aristida divaricata
5. Arrabidaea chica
6. Astragalus geminiflorus
7. Banksia marginata
8. Brachyotum confertum
9. Bertholletia excelsa
10. Brugmansia suaveolens
11. Brunellia ovalifolia
12. Cavanillesia platanifolia
13. Centronia mutisii
14. Cephalanthus salicifolius
15. Ceroxylon alpinum
16. Chuquiraga jussieui
17. Claytonia perfoliata
18. Coriaria thymifolia
19. Dorstenia tenuis
20. Draba violacea
21. Eucalyptus diversifolia
22. Eudema nubigena
23. Eugenia albida
24. Huperzia crassa
25. Hydrocleys nymphoides
26. Iochroma fuchsioides
27. Ipomoea arborescens
28. Iresine diffusa
29. Jacksonia furcellata
30. Juniperus phoenicea
31. Lilaea scilloides (synonym of Triglochin scilloides)
32. Limnobium laevigatum
33. Limnocharis flava
34. Ludwigia helminthorrhiza
35. Ludwigia sedioides
36. Maurandya antirrhiniflora
37. Melaleuca pallida
38. Miconia caelata
39. Miconia guayaquilensis
40. Miconia lacera
41. Miconia minutiflora
42. Miconia theaezans
43. Mimosa somnians
44. Monochaetum multiflorum
45. Passiflora arborea
46. Pinguicula moranensis
47. Prosopis laevigata
48. Prosopis pallida
49. Prumnopitys montana
50. Quararibea cordata
51. Quercus crassifolia
52. Quercus crassipes
53. Quercus depressa
54. Quercus diversifolia
55. Quercus humboldtii
56. Quercus mexicana
57. Quercus obtusata
58. Quercus repanda
59. Quercus xalapensis
60. Smilax havanensis
61. Stanhopea grandiflora
62. Stanhopea jenischiana
63. Styrax tomentosus
64. Symphoricarpos microphyllus
65. Symplocos coccinea
66. Tagetes zypaquirensis
67. Theobroma bicolor
68. Trichilia acuminata
69. Viola cheiranthifolia
70. Vitis tiliifolia
71. Zieria laevigata

== Works ==
- 1805: Essai sur la géographie des plantes. Written with Alexander von Humboldt.
  - von Humboldt, Alexander; Bonpland, Aimé (2009). Essay on the geography of plants. Translated by Sylvie Romanowski, with an Introduction by Stephen T. Jackson. University of Chicago Press. ISBN 9780226360669. OCLC 977369593. English translation from 2009.
- 1811: A collection of observations on zoology and comparative anatomy written with Alexander von Humboldt, Printing JH Stone, Paris. Digital version at the website Gallica.
- 1813: Description of rare plants grown at Malmaison and Navarre by Aimé Bonpland. Printing P. The elder Didot, Paris. By Aimé Bonpland dedicated to the Empress Joséphine. Digital version at the website Botanicus, and Digital version of the illustrations at the website of the Bibliothèque interuniversitaire de santé (Interuniversity Library of Health).
- 1815: Nova plantarum genera and species written with Alexander von Humboldt and Karl Sigismund Kunth, Volume 1, Lutetiae Parisiorum, Paris. Digital version at the website Botanicus.
- 1816: Monograph Melastomacées including all plants of this order including Rhexies, Volume 1, Paris.
- 1817: Nova plantarum genera and species written with Alexander von Humboldt and Karl Sigismund Kunth, Volume 2, Lutetiae Parisiorum, Paris. Digital version at the website Botanicus.
- 1818: Nova plantarum genera and species written with Alexander von Humboldt and Karl Sigismund Kunth, Volume 3, Lutetiae Parisiorum, Paris. Digital version at the website Botanicus.
- 1820: Nova plantarum genera and species written with Alexander von Humboldt and Karl Sigismund Kunth, Volume 4, Lutetiae Parisiorum, Paris. Digital version at the website Botanicus.
- 1821: Nova plantarum genera and species written with Alexander von Humboldt and Karl Sigismund Kunth, Volume 5, Lutetiae Parisiorum, Paris. Digital version at the website Botanicus.
- 1823: Nova plantarum genera and species written with Alexander von Humboldt and Karl Sigismund Kunth, Volume 6, Lutetiae Parisiorum, Paris. Digital version at the website Botanicus.
- 1823: Monograph Melastomacées including all plants of this order including Rhexies, Volume 2, Paris.
- 1825: Nova plantarum genera and species written with Alexander von Humboldt and Karl Sigismund Kunth, Volume 7, Lutetiae Parisiorum, Paris. Digital version at the website Botanicus.

== See also ==
- Rengger, Johann Rudolph (1795–1832)
- von Humboldt, Alexander (1769–1859)
- Category:Taxa named by Aimé Bonpland
