= Quercus repanda =

Conservation status
- Least Concern (IUCN 3.1)

Scientific classification
- Kingdom: Plantae
- Clade: Embryophytes
- Clade: Tracheophytes
- Clade: Spermatophytes
- Clade: Angiosperms
- Clade: Eudicots
- Clade: Rosids
- Order: Fagales
- Family: Fagaceae
- Genus: Quercus
- Subgenus: Quercus subg. Quercus
- Section: Quercus sect. Quercus
- Species: Q. repanda

Binomial name
- Quercus repanda Bonpl.

Synonyms
- Quercus lecomteana Trel.; Quercus revoluta Trel.; Quercus revoluta f. dysophyllopsis Trel.; Quercus subtriloba Trel.

Species of oak tree

Quercus repanda is a species of oak endemic to the mountains of central Mexico.

== Description ==
Quercus repanda is a small deciduous or semi-evergreen shrub, which grows 0.2 to 1.5 meters high.

== Range and habitat ==
Quercus repanda is native to the southern Sierra Madre Oriental, the Trans-Mexican Volcanic Belt, the northernmost Sierra Madre de Oaxaca, and several isolated ranges on the Mexican Plateau in the states of Aguascalientes, Guanajuato, Hidalgo, Michoacán, Puebla, Queretaro, San Luis Potosi, and Veracruz.

Quercus repanda is found in pine forests, pine–oak forests, oak forests, and arid scrubland, where it forms large patches. Its elevational range extends from 1,700 to 2,800 meters, and possibly from 1,100 to 3,140 meters. It is associated with species of pine, Agave, Arbutus, Baccharis, Cupressus, and Opuntia, and the oaks Quercus depressa, Quercus eduardi, Quercus laurina, and Quercus mexicana.
