= Roving sailor =

Roving sailor refers to the following plants:

- Maurandella antirrhiniflora, the only species in the flowering plant Maurandella, also known as climbing snapdragon or Maurandya antirrhiniflora
- Saxifraga stolonifera, a perennial flowering plant native to Asia
- Cymbalaria muralis, a flowering plant native to Mediterranean Europe called "roving sailor" on the Isle of Wight
