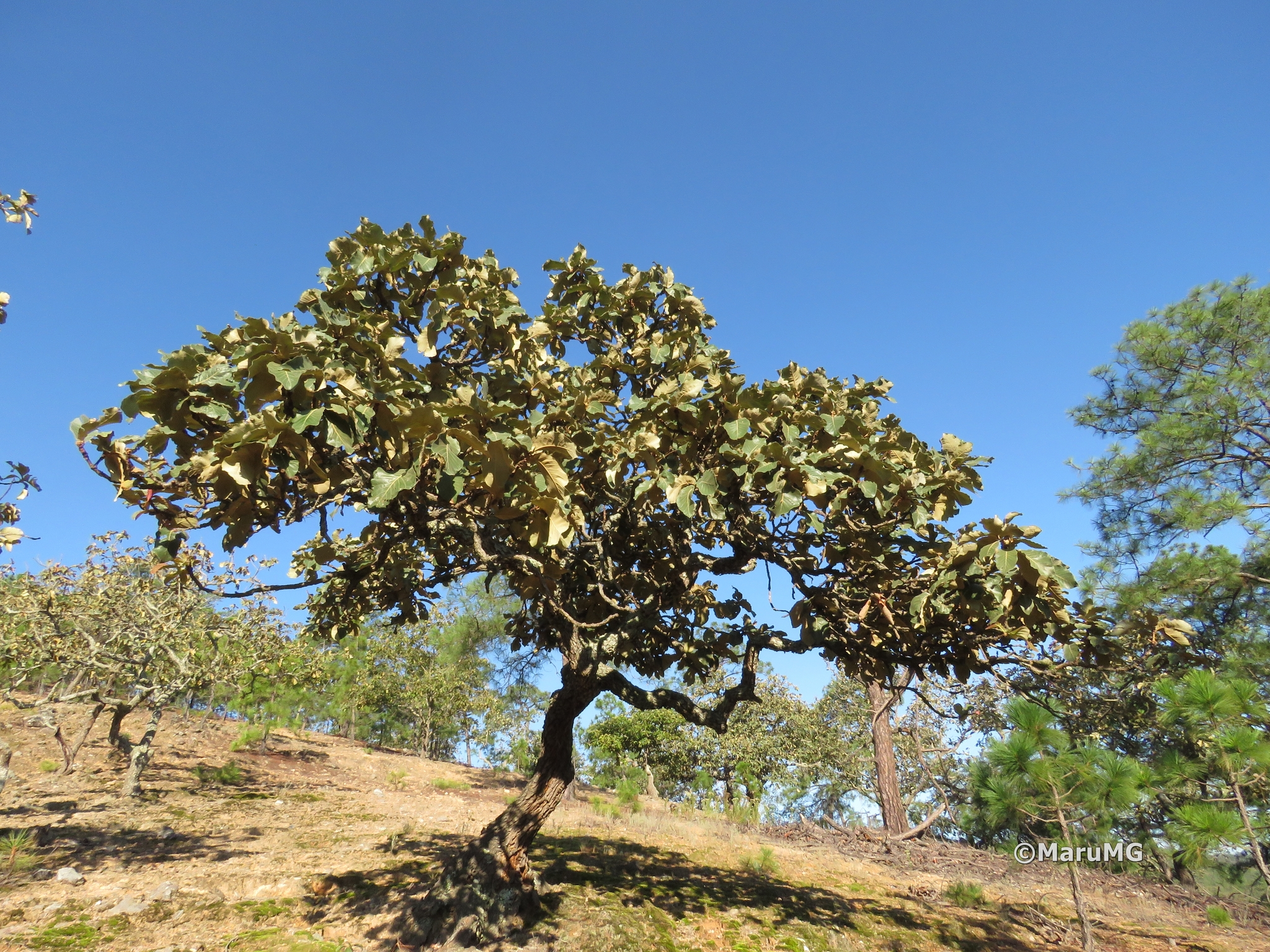

Conservation status
- Least Concern (IUCN 3.1)

Scientific classification
- Kingdom: Plantae
- Clade: Embryophytes
- Clade: Tracheophytes
- Clade: Spermatophytes
- Clade: Angiosperms
- Clade: Eudicots
- Clade: Rosids
- Order: Fagales
- Family: Fagaceae
- Genus: Quercus
- Subgenus: Quercus subg. Quercus
- Section: Quercus sect. Lobatae
- Species: Q. jonesii

Binomial name
- Quercus jonesii Trel.

Synonyms
- Quercus coccolobifolia Trel.; Quercus endlichiana Trel.; Quercus endlichiana f. minor C.H.Mull.; Quercus endlichiana f. serrata C.H.Mull.

= Quercus jonesii =

Species of oak tree

Quercus jonesii is a species of oak tree native to Mexico. It is commonly known as palo manzano. It is placed in Quercus section Lobatae.

== Description ==
Quercus jonesii is small tree which typically reaches 4–8 metres (13–26 feet) in height.

== Distribution and habitat ==
The species is native to the Sierra Madre Occidental, Sierra Madre Oriental, and smaller ranges of the Mexican Plateau in between the two Sierras, in the states of Aguascalientes, Chihuahua, Durango, Guanajuato, northern Jalisco, eastern Nayarit, San Luis Potosí, Nuevo León, Sinaloa, and Sonora

It is found in pine–oak forests, oak forests, and oak and pine–oak woodlands. It typically grows in isolated patches on well-drained rocky slopes in otherwise humid areas. It is often associated with Q. eduardi, Q. resinosa, and Q. laeta.
