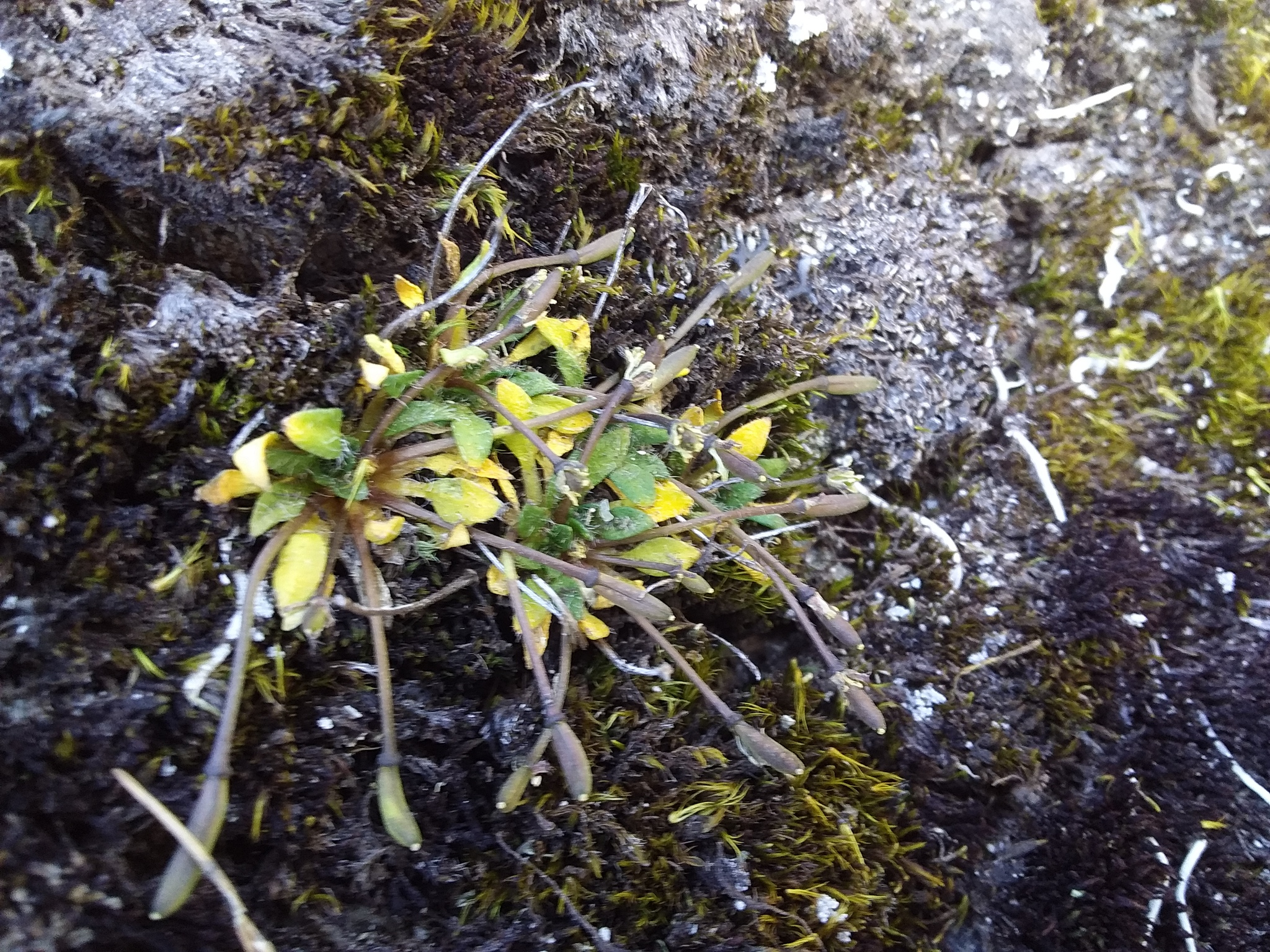
- Eudema monimocalyx in Bolivia

Scientific classification
- Kingdom: Plantae
- Clade: Embryophytes
- Clade: Tracheophytes
- Clade: Spermatophytes
- Clade: Angiosperms
- Clade: Eudicots
- Clade: Rosids
- Order: Brassicales
- Family: Brassicaceae
- Genus: Eudema; Bonpl. (1813)

Species
- 10; see text

Synonyms
- Brayopsis Gilg & Muschl. (1909); Endema Pritz. (1854), orth. var.

= Eudema =

Genus of flowering plants

Eudema is a genus of flowering plants in the family Brassicaceae. It contains ten species native to South America, ranging from Ecuador and Peru to Bolivia and northwestern Argentina.

== Species ==
Ten species are accepted.

- Eudema arequipa (Al-Shehbaz, A.Cano, M.A.Cueva & Salariato) Al-Shehbaz, Salariato, A.Cano & Zuloaga
- Eudema calycinum (Desv.) Al-Shehbaz, Salariato, A.Cano & Zuloaga
- Eudema chacasensis (Al-Shehbaz & A.Cano) Al-Shehbaz, Salariato, A.Cano & Zuloaga
- Eudema cuscoensis (Al-Shehbaz, P.Gonzáles, A.Cano & Trinidad) Al-Shehbaz, Salariato, A.Cano & Zuloaga
- Eudema diapensioides (Wedd.) O.E.Schulz
- Eudema incurva Al-Shehbaz
- Eudema limensis (Al-Shehbaz, Trinidad, A.Cano & P.Gonzáles) Al-Shehbaz, Salariato, A.Cano & Zuloaga
- Eudema monimocalyx (O.E.Schulz) Al-Shehbaz, Salariato, A.Cano & Zuloaga
- Eudema peruviana Al-Shehbaz & A.Cano
- Eudema rupestris Bonpl.

=== Formerly placed here ===
- Borealandea nubigena (Bonpl.) Al-Shehbaz, Salariato, A.Cano & Zuloaga (as Eudema nubigena Bonpl.)
