= Ornithocephalus =

The name Ornithocephalus ('bird head') may refer either to

- Ornithocephalus (plant), a genus of orchids
- an obsolete name once applied to a pterosaur specimen now classified as Pterodactylus.
