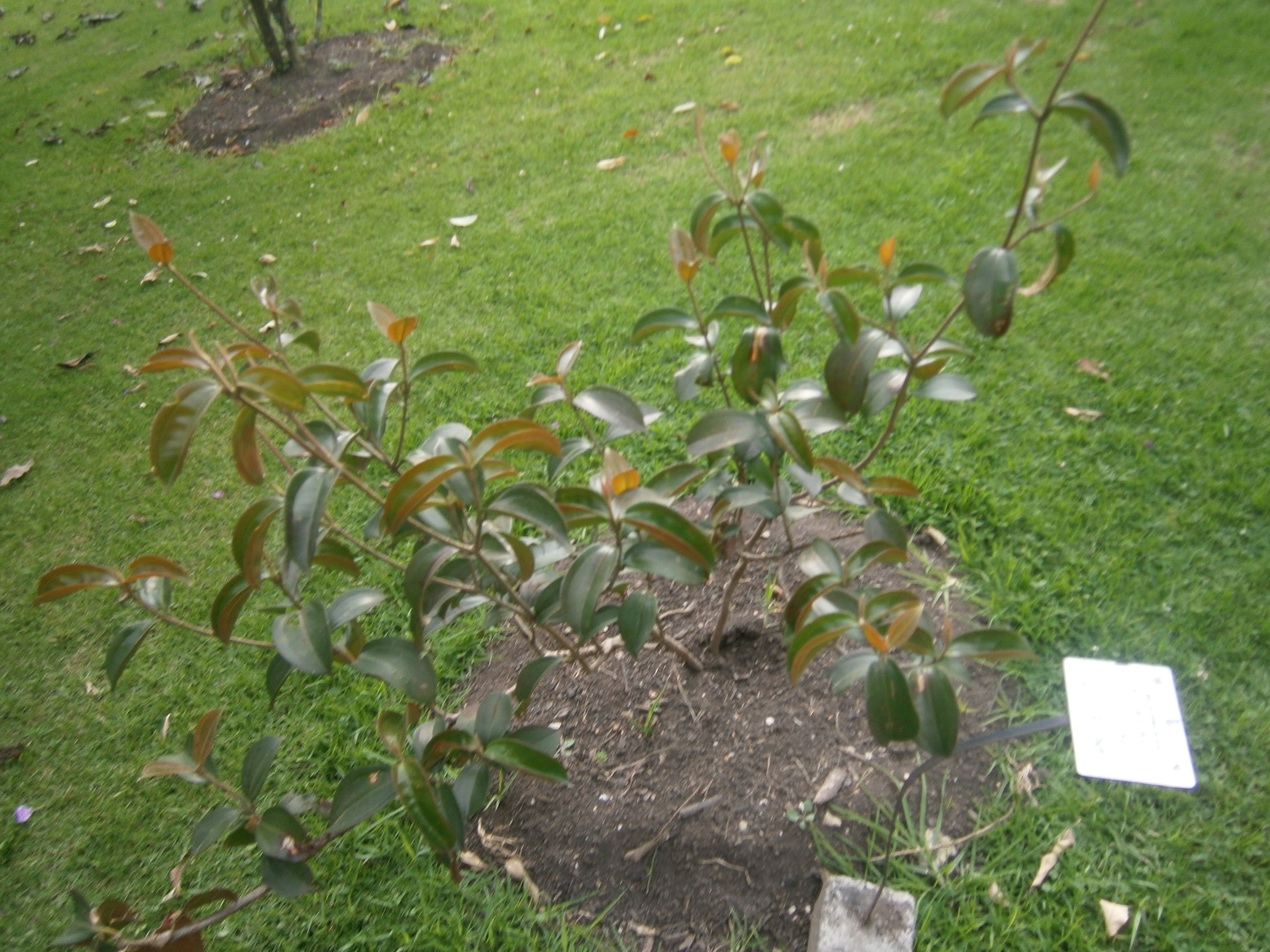
- Centronia mutisii

Scientific classification
- Kingdom: Plantae
- Clade: Tracheophytes
- Clade: Angiosperms
- Clade: Eudicots
- Clade: Rosids
- Order: Myrtales
- Family: Melastomataceae
- Genus: Centronia; D.Don

= Centronia =

Genus of flowering plants

Centronia is a genus of plants in the family Melastomataceae.

Species include:

- Centronia brachycera (Naudin) Triana
- Centronia laurifolia D.Don
- Centronia mutisii (Bonpl.) Triana
- Centronia peruviana J.F.Macbr.
