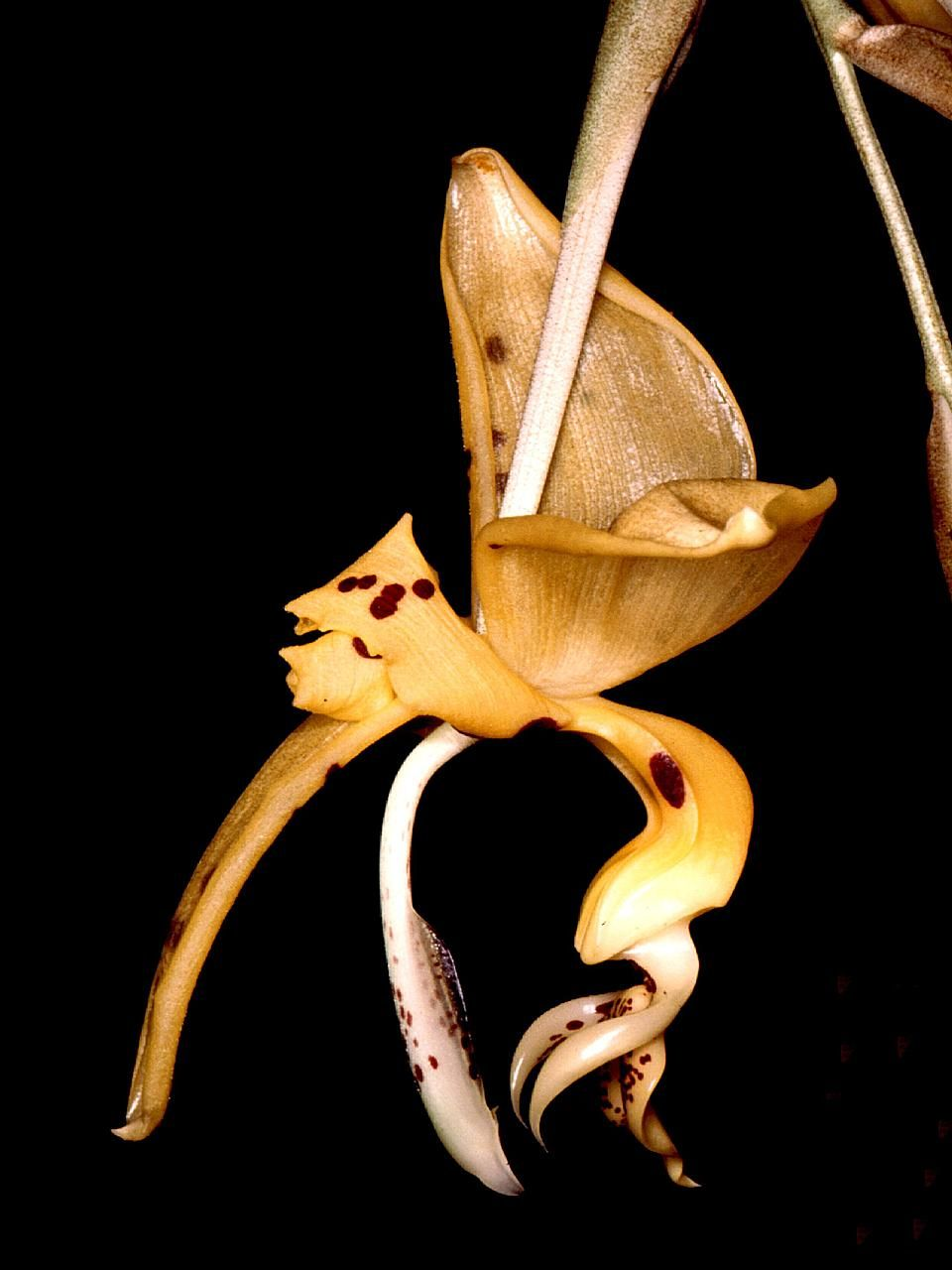
- Stanhopea jenischiana flower

Scientific classification
- Kingdom: Plantae
- Clade: Tracheophytes
- Clade: Angiosperms
- Clade: Monocots
- Order: Asparagales
- Family: Orchidaceae
- Subfamily: Epidendroideae
- Genus: Stanhopea
- Species: S. jenischiana

Binomial name
- Stanhopea jenischiana F.Kramer ex Rchb.f.

Synonyms
- Epidendrum grandiflorum Humb. & Bonpl.; Anguloa grandiflora (Humb. & Bonpl.) Kunth; Stanhopea grandiflora (Humb. & Bonpl.) Rchb.f.

= Stanhopea jenischiana =

Species of orchid

Stanhopea jenischiana is a species of orchid endemic to Colombia, Peru, Ecuador, and Venezuela. The flowers are 5 cm in diameter, and have an orange-yellow to gold color, with dark chestnut-red spots on the lip and often have a dark color at the base of the petals.
