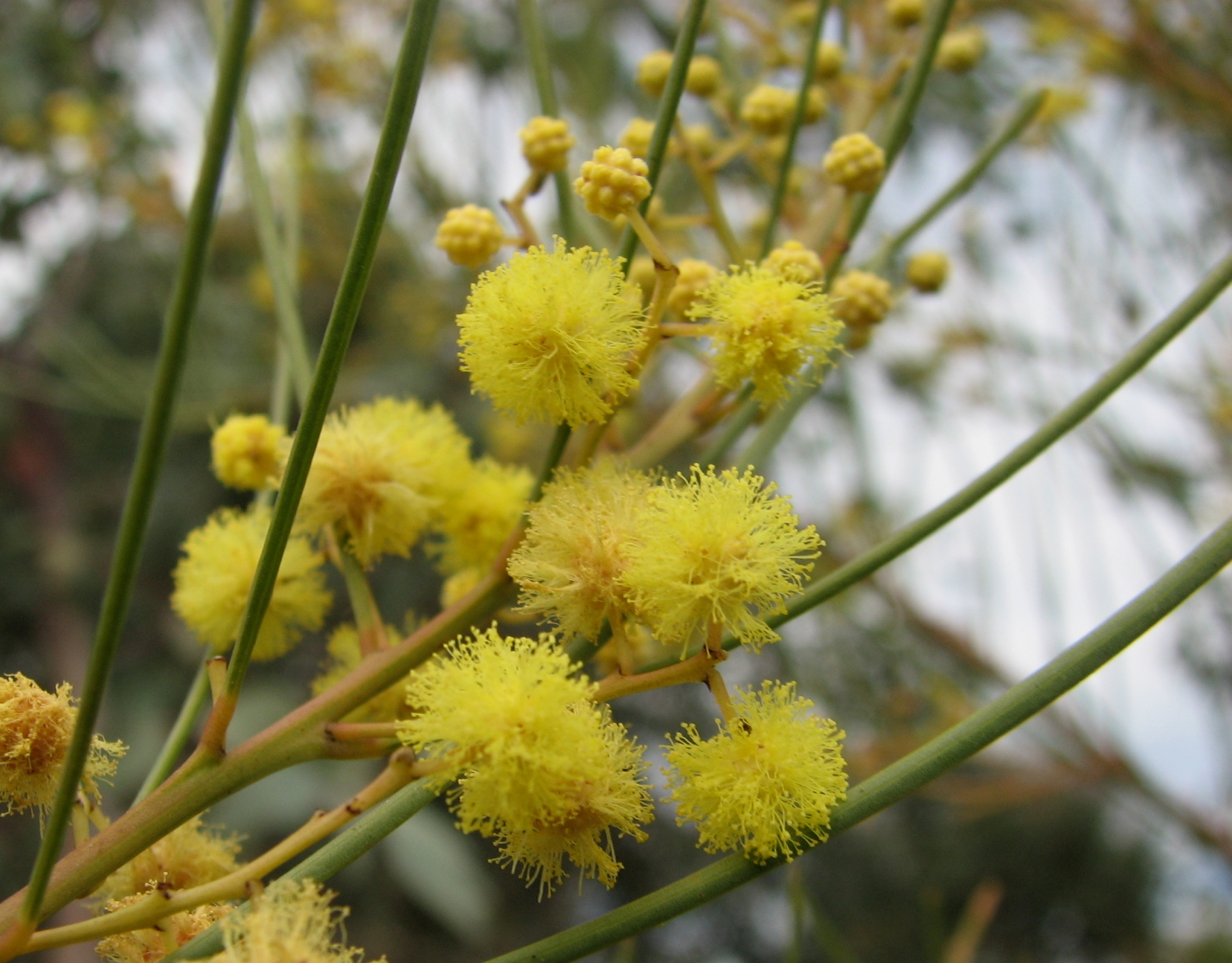
- In the Royal Botanic Gardens, Cranbourne

Scientific classification
- Kingdom: Plantae
- Clade: Embryophytes
- Clade: Tracheophytes
- Clade: Spermatophytes
- Clade: Angiosperms
- Clade: Eudicots
- Clade: Rosids
- Order: Fabales
- Family: Fabaceae
- Subfamily: Caesalpinioideae
- Clade: Mimosoid clade
- Genus: Acacia
- Species: A. subulata

Binomial name
- Acacia subulata Bonpl.
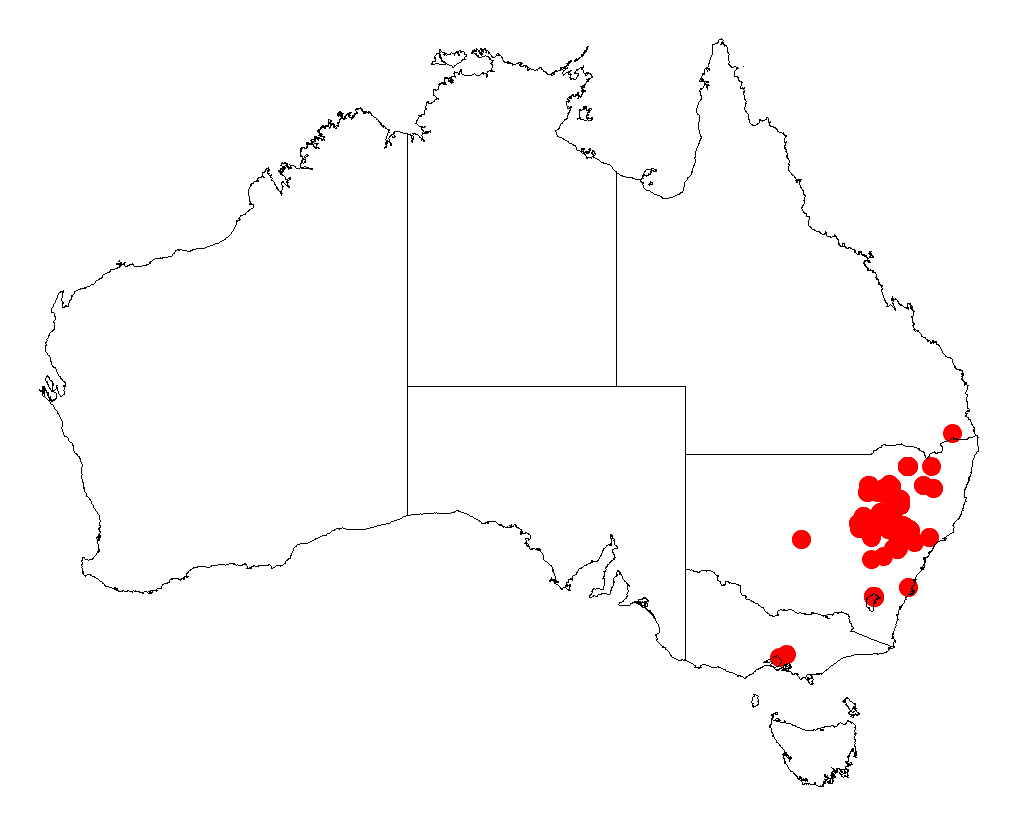
- Occurrence data from AVH

= Acacia subulata =

Species of legume

Acacia subulata, commonly known as awl-leaf wattle, is a shrub endemic to New South Wales in Australia.

The species grows to between 1 and 4 metres high and has phyllodes that measure 6 to 14 cm long and 0.8 to 1.5 mm wide. These are straight or slightly curved. The globular yellow flowerheads appear in racemes (groups of 3 to 11) in the phyllode axils predominantly from June to December. Plants may flower up to three times a year. These are followed by straight or slightly curved seed pods that are 4 to 18 cm long and 4 to 8 mm wide.

== See also ==
- List of Acacia species
