= Centronia peruviana =

Conservation status
- Vulnerable (IUCN 2.3)

Scientific classification
- Kingdom: Plantae
- Clade: Tracheophytes
- Clade: Angiosperms
- Clade: Eudicots
- Clade: Rosids
- Order: Myrtales
- Family: Melastomataceae
- Genus: Centronia
- Species: C. peruviana

Binomial name
- Centronia peruviana J. F. Macbr.

Species of plant

Centronia peruviana is a species of plant in the family Melastomataceae. It is endemic to Peru.

== Description ==
The plant has been observed growing from 3-5 m in height. It bears flowers with waxy pinkish petals.
