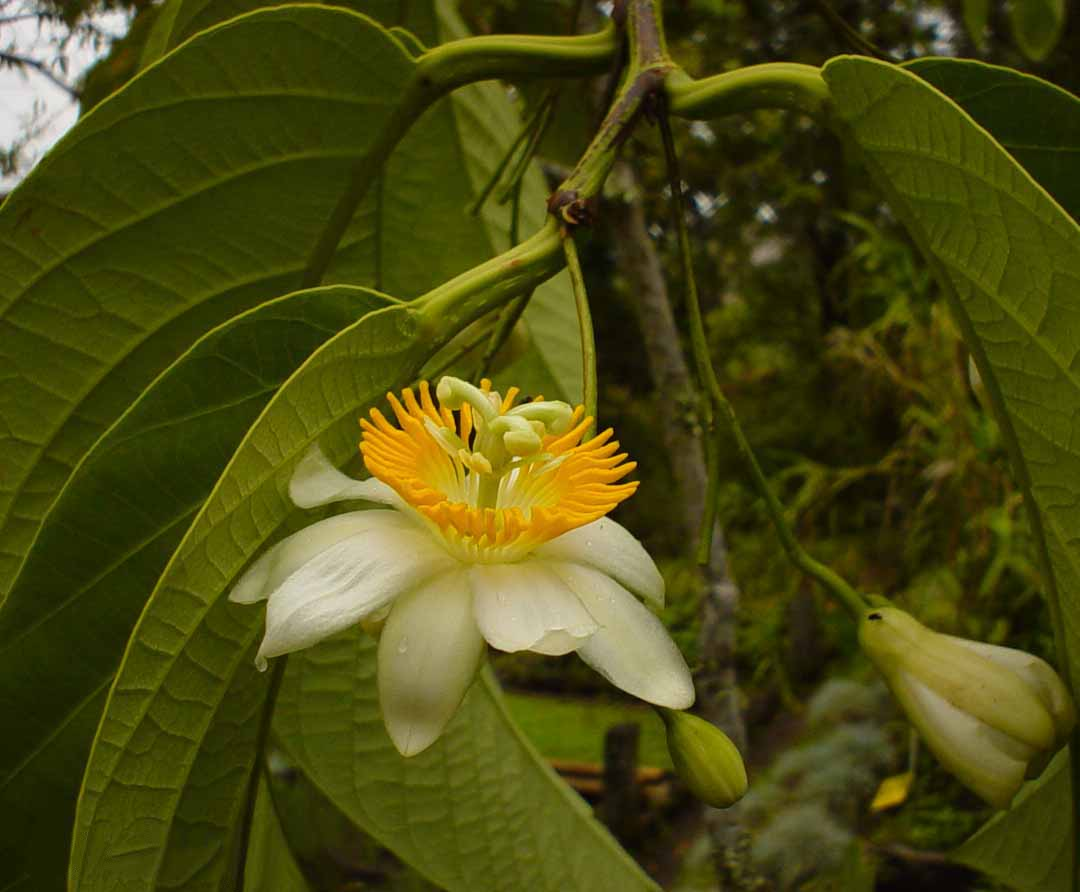

Scientific classification
- Kingdom: Plantae
- Clade: Tracheophytes
- Clade: Angiosperms
- Clade: Eudicots
- Clade: Rosids
- Order: Malpighiales
- Family: Passifloraceae
- Genus: Passiflora
- Species: P. arborea

Binomial name
- Passiflora arborea Spreng.

Synonyms
- Astrophea glauca M. Roem.; Passiflora glauca Bonpl.

= Passiflora arborea =

Species of vine

Passiflora arborea is a species of passion flower found in Colombia, Ecuador and Panama. Passiflora arborea is a freestanding tree that can grow to be 50 feet tall. They germinate anywhere from an elevation of 1400 – 2000 ft. The tree's leaves grow to be 1 to 1½ feet long. It is native to Colombia, is rarely seen in cultivation, and is one of two species of Passiflora that is not widely distributed throughout the country.

== Pests and diseases ==
On the rare occurrence that P. arborea is cultivated outside of its natural habitat as a greenhouse culture it can be vulnerable to some damaging pests. Some examples include mealy bugs (Pseudococcidae spp.), aphids (aphidoidea), Western flower thrips (Frankiniella occidentalis) and scale insects (Coccoidea spp.). A similar pest that is shared and favours cultivated Passiflora species are glasshouse spider mites (Tetranychus urticae).

Fungal diseases are not a big problem for these plants under greenhouse conditions, but on occasion, some plants can be affected by powdery mildew (order: Erysiphales). These issues can be caused by watering stress.

Unsightly pest damage can remain on the plant until a new flush of growth appears. If left unchecked, the damage and be permanent resulting in the loss of the plant. Leaf damage in these plants can occur under greenhouse conditions involving the exposure of new growing leaves to unfavourable temperature conditions. When newly emerging growth is exposed to a sudden temperature drop during spring, the leaves will have less chlorophyll around the leaf margins and have a white appearance.

Most cases of pest infestation in cultivated plants can be traced back to a poor growing environment or incorrect potting height. Both of these factors have the potential to weaken the plant and make it more prone to infestation and unable to properly recover.
