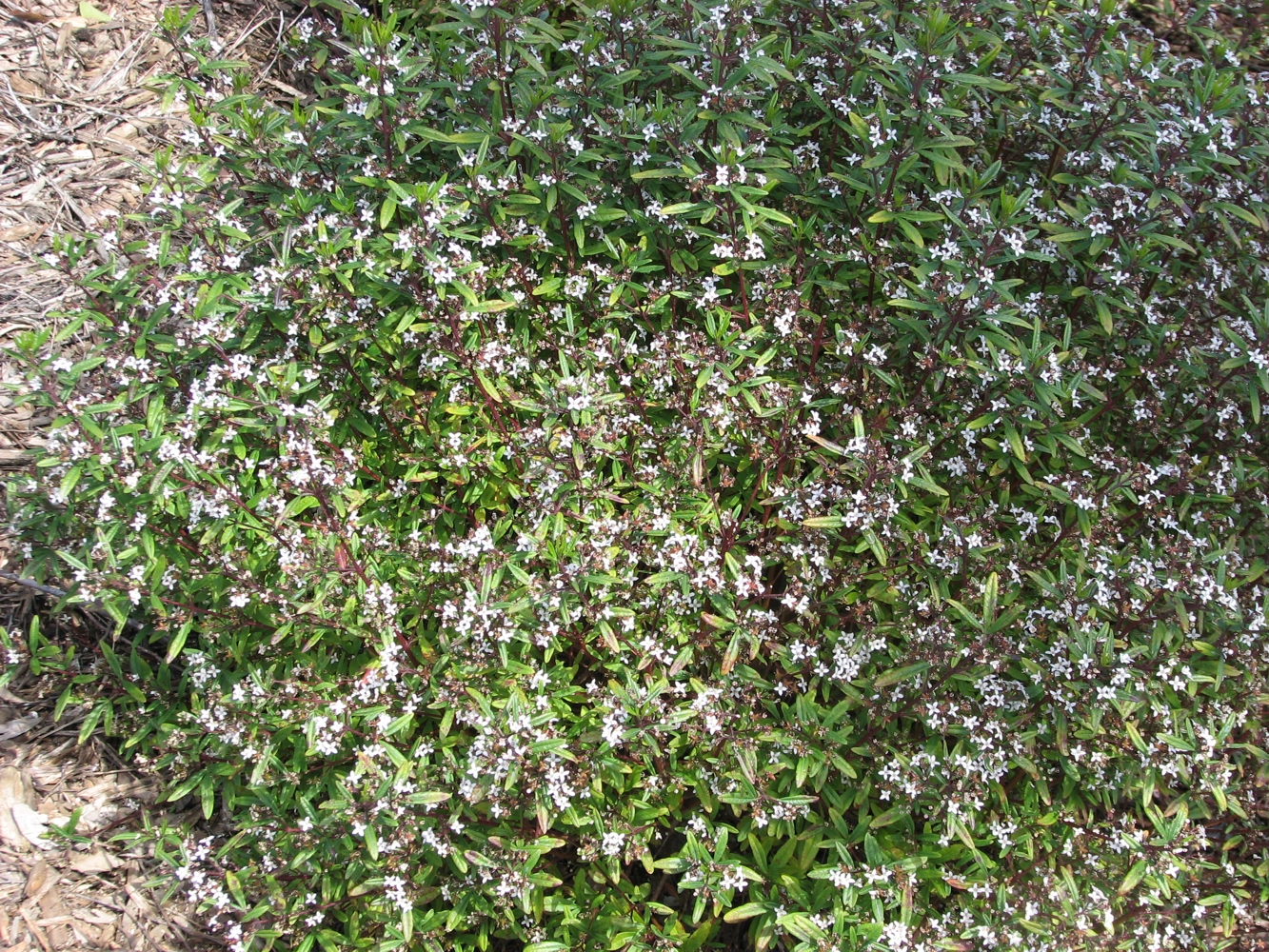
- In the Royal Botanic Gardens, Cranbourne

Scientific classification
- Kingdom: Plantae
- Clade: Tracheophytes
- Clade: Angiosperms
- Clade: Eudicots
- Clade: Rosids
- Order: Sapindales
- Family: Rutaceae
- Genus: Zieria
- Species: Z. laevigata

Binomial name
- Zieria laevigata Bonpl.

= Zieria laevigata =

Smooth zieria

Species of flowering plant

Zieria laevigata commonly known as smooth zieria, smooth-leaved zieria or twiggy midge bush, is a species of flowering plant in the citrus family Rutaceae and is endemic to eastern Australia. It is an erect shrub with smooth, three-part leaves and pale pink or white flowers with four petals and four stamens. It grows in poor soil on rocky outcrops and flowers from late winter to spring.

== Description ==
Zieria laevigata is an erect shrub which grows to a height of about 150 cm (60 in) and has branches which are mostly glabrous. The leaves are composed of three leaflets with the central one linear or elliptic, 15–40 mm (0.6–2 in) long and 1–3 mm (0.04–0.1 in) wide with a petiole 2–4 mm (0.08–0.2 in) long. Unlike those of most other zierias, the leaflets are not warty but their edges are rolled under, sometimes to the mid-rib. The upper surface is dark green but the lower one is pale green and velvety. The flowers are usually arranged in groups of three, sometimes up to 23, the groups about the same length as the leaves. The sepals are triangular, about 2.5 mm (0.1 in) long and covered with warty glands. The four petals are white to pale pink, 3–5 mm (0.1–0.2 in) long, overlap at their bases and are covered with tiny, soft hairs. Flowering occurs from August to December and the fruits which follow are present from November to December and are glabrous with scattered warts.

== Taxonomy and naming ==
Zieria laevigata was first formally described in 1815 by Aimé Bonpland, along with Zieria smithii, Zieria microphylla (now Z.pilosa) and Zieria macrophylla (now Z. arborescens). The description was published in Bonpland's book Description des Plantes Rares cultivees a Malmaison et a Navarre. The specific epithet (laevigata) is a Latin word meaning "smooth".

== Distribution and habitat ==
Smooth zieria is widespread and common on the coasts and nearby tablelands from near Stanthorpe in Queensland to Jervis Bay in New South Wales. It grows in poor soil on sandstone and granite outcrops, often with Eucalyptus prava.
