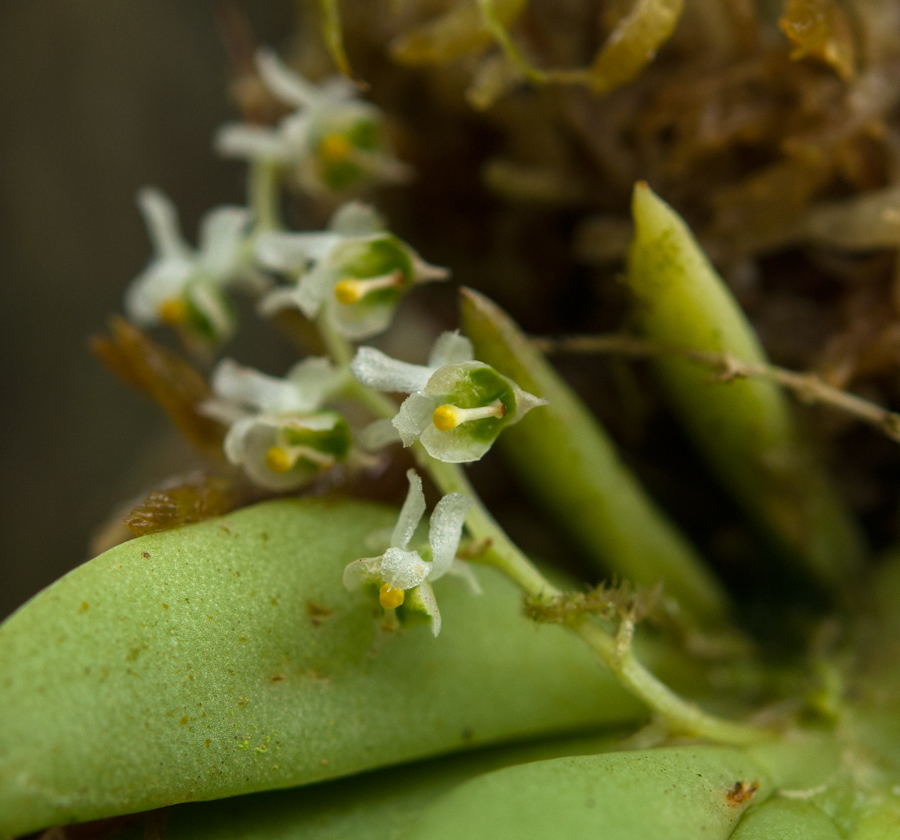

Scientific classification
- Kingdom: Plantae
- Clade: Tracheophytes
- Clade: Angiosperms
- Clade: Monocots
- Order: Asparagales
- Family: Orchidaceae
- Subfamily: Epidendroideae
- Genus: Ornithocephalus
- Species: O. manabina

Binomial name
- Ornithocephalus manabina Dodson

= Ornithocephalus manabina =

Species of orchid

Ornithocephalus manabina is a species of orchid in the genus Orchidaceae.
