= Ornithocephalus falcatus =

Scientific classification
- Kingdom: Plantae
- Clade: Tracheophytes
- Clade: Angiosperms
- Clade: Monocots
- Order: Asparagales
- Family: Orchidaceae
- Subfamily: Epidendroideae
- Genus: Ornithocephalus
- Species: O. falcatus

Binomial name
- Ornithocephalus falcatus Focke

Species of orchid

Ornithocephalus falcatus is a species of orchid found from the Guianas, Venezuela, Ecuador, and Peru.
