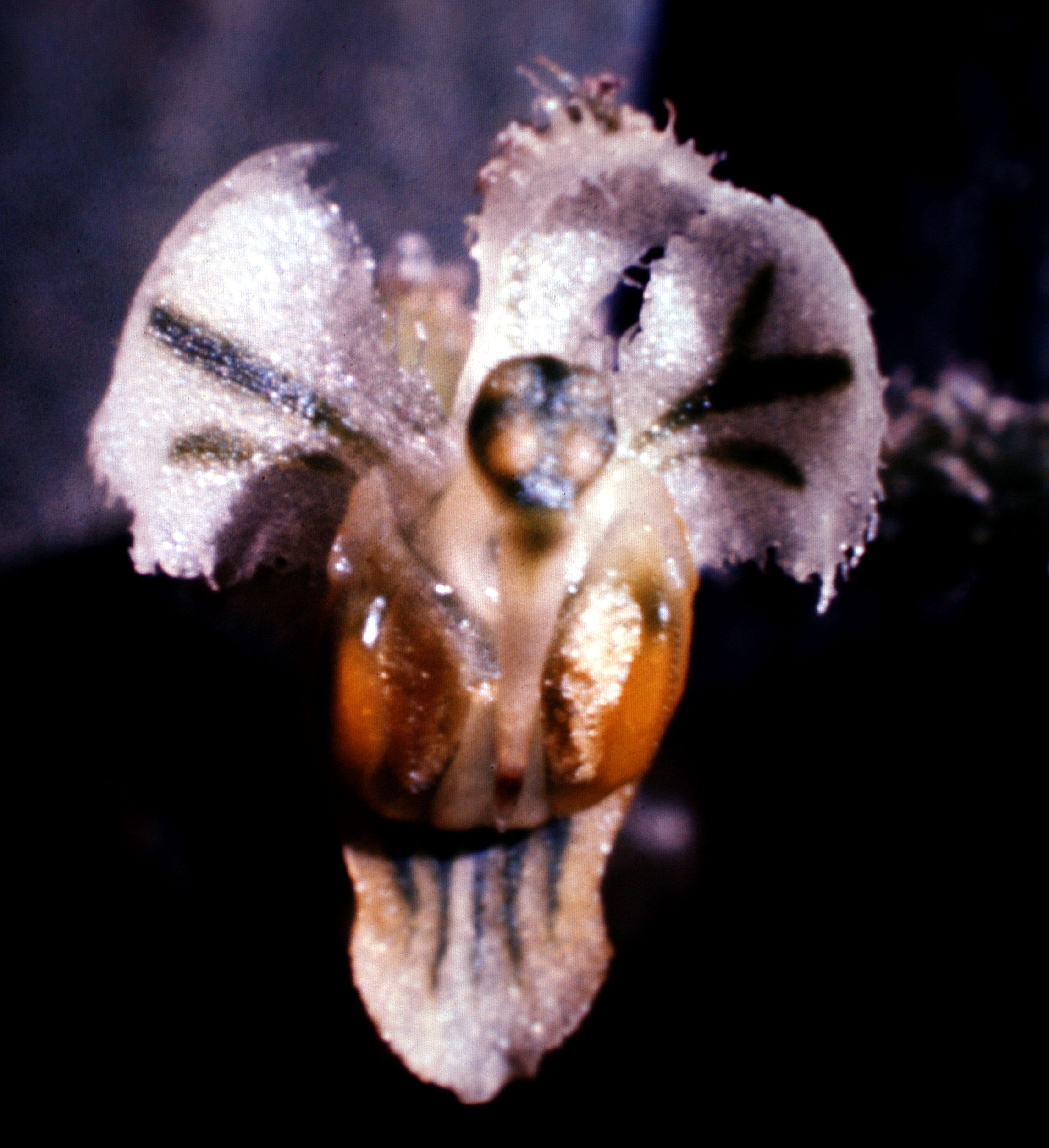

Scientific classification
- Kingdom: Plantae
- Clade: Tracheophytes
- Clade: Angiosperms
- Clade: Monocots
- Order: Asparagales
- Family: Orchidaceae
- Subfamily: Epidendroideae
- Genus: Ornithocephalus
- Species: O. ciliatus

Binomial name
- Ornithocephalus ciliatus Lindl.

Synonyms
- Ornithocephalus avicula Rchb.f.; Ornithocephalus kruegeri Rchb.f.; Ornithocephalus cruegeri Rchb.f. ex Griseb.; Ornithocephalus graciliscapus Cogn.

= Ornithocephalus ciliatus =

Species of orchid

Ornithocephalus ciliatus is a species of orchid found from Trinidad, the Guianas, Venezuela, Ecuador, Peru and Brazil.
