= Borealandea =

Scientific classification
- Kingdom: Plantae
- Clade: Embryophytes
- Clade: Tracheophytes
- Clade: Spermatophytes
- Clade: Angiosperms
- Clade: Eudicots
- Clade: Rosids
- Order: Brassicales
- Family: Brassicaceae
- Tribe: Eudemeae
- Genus: Borealandea; Al-Shehbaz, Salariato, A.Cano & Zuloaga

Genus of flowering plants

Borealandea is a genus of flowering plants in the family Brassicaceae. It includes three species of perennials and subshrubs native to Colombia and Ecuador, which grow in montane habitats in the Andes.

- Borealandea colombiana (Al-Shehbaz) Al-Shehbaz, Salariato, A.Cano & Zuloaga – east-central & northeastern Colombia
- Borealandea ecuadoriana (Al-Shehbaz) Al-Shehbaz, Salariato, A.Cano & Zuloaga – Ecuador (Azuary)
- Borealandea nubigena (Bonpl.) Al-Shehbaz, Salariato, A.Cano & Zuloaga – Ecuador
