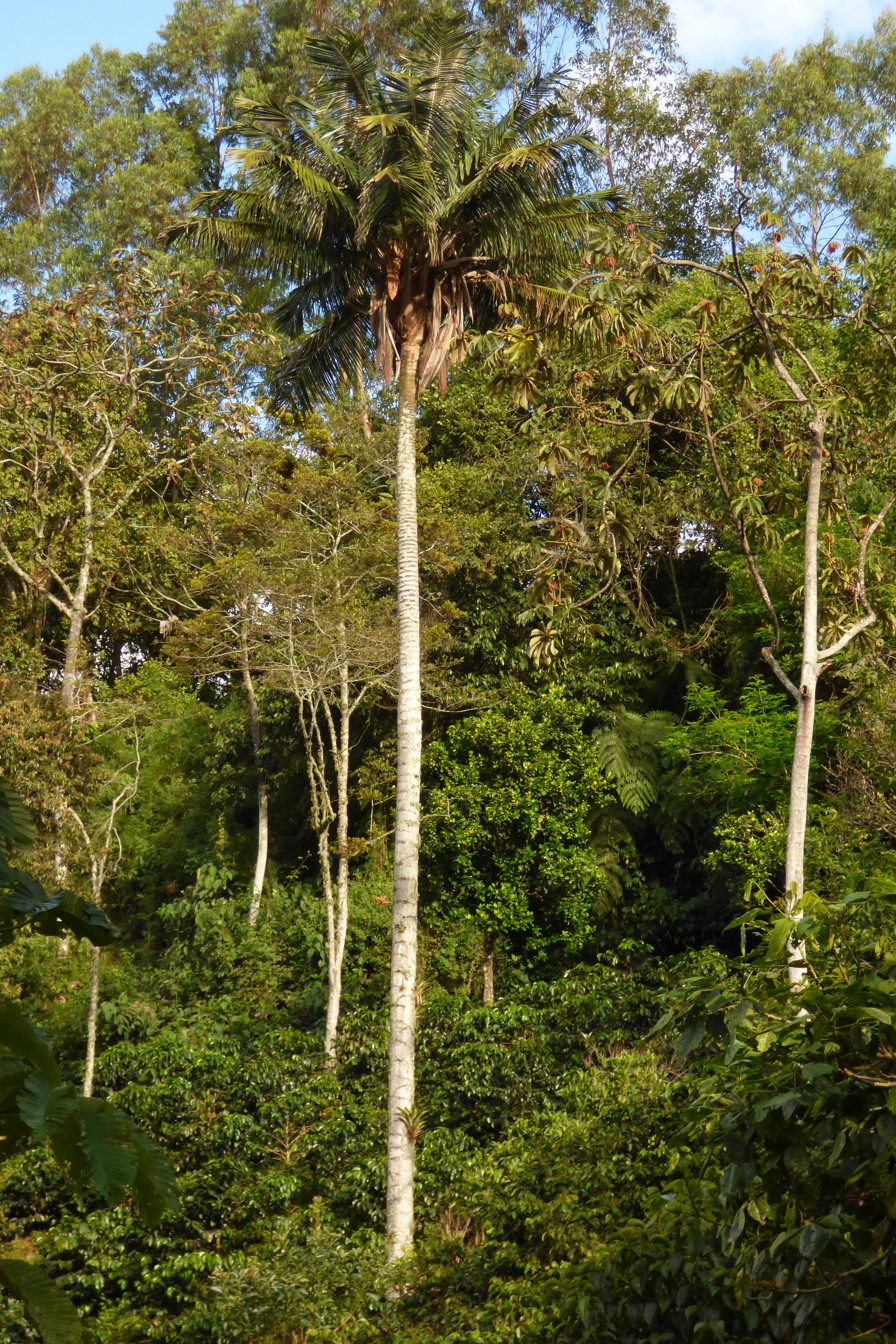

Conservation status
- Endangered (IUCN 2.3)

Scientific classification
- Kingdom: Plantae
- Clade: Embryophytes
- Clade: Tracheophytes
- Clade: Angiosperms
- Clade: Monocots
- Clade: Commelinids
- Order: Arecales
- Family: Arecaceae
- Genus: Ceroxylon
- Species: C. alpinum

Binomial name
- Ceroxylon alpinum Bonpl. ex DC.

= Ceroxylon alpinum =

Species of palm

Ceroxylon alpinum, also known as the Andean wax palm, is a species of palm tree native to Colombia, Ecuador, and Venezuela. It is threatened by habitat loss.
