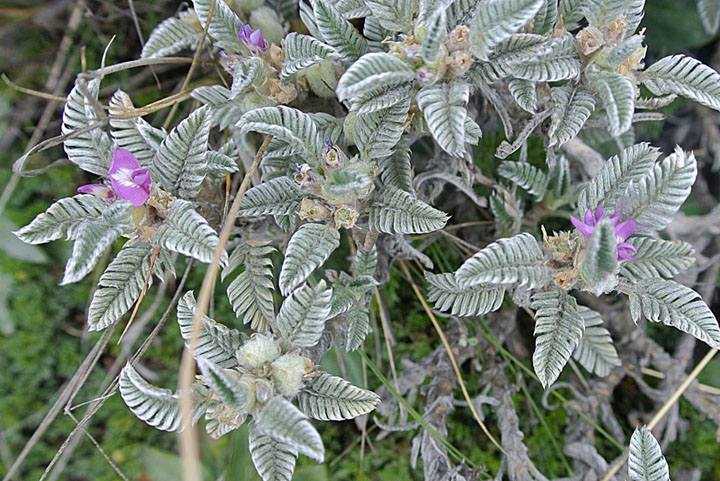

Conservation status
- Least Concern (IUCN 3.1)

Scientific classification
- Kingdom: Plantae
- Clade: Tracheophytes
- Clade: Angiosperms
- Clade: Eudicots
- Clade: Rosids
- Order: Fabales
- Family: Fabaceae
- Subfamily: Faboideae
- Genus: Astragalus
- Species: A. geminiflorus

Binomial name
- Astragalus geminiflorus Bonpl.

= Astragalus geminiflorus =

Species of legume

Astragalus geminiflorus is a species of legume in the family Fabaceae. It is found only in Ecuador. Its natural habitat is subtropical or tropical high-elevation grassland.
