= Centronia brachycera =

Conservation status
- Vulnerable (IUCN 2.3)

Scientific classification
- Kingdom: Plantae
- Clade: Tracheophytes
- Clade: Angiosperms
- Clade: Eudicots
- Clade: Rosids
- Order: Myrtales
- Family: Melastomataceae
- Genus: Centronia
- Species: C. brachycera

Binomial name
- Centronia brachycera (Naudin) Triana

Species of flowering plant

Centronia brachycera is a species of plant in the family Melastomataceae. It is endemic to Colombia.
