= Santa Ana, Misiones =

Santa Ana (Misiones)
- Municipality and town
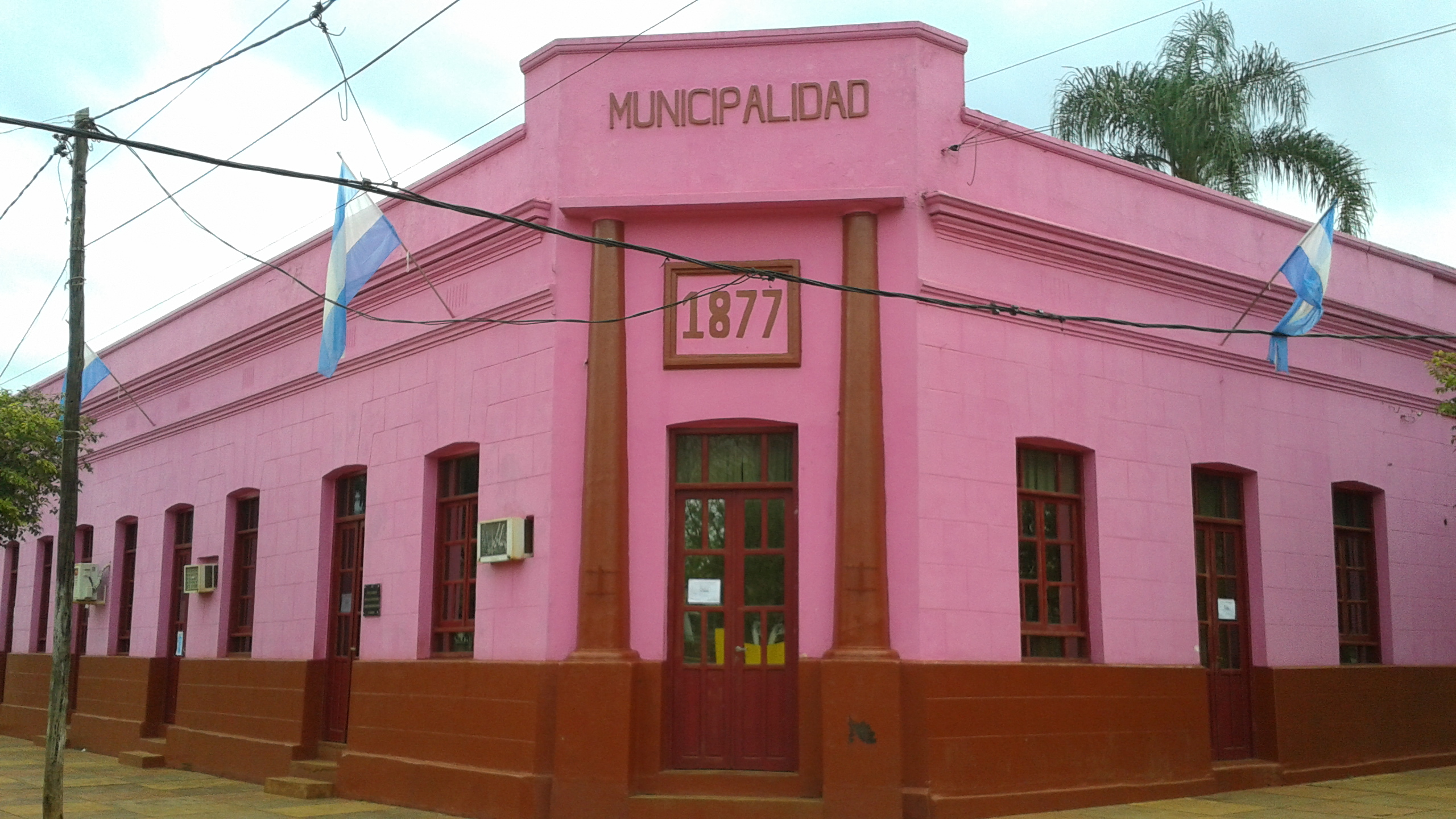

- Location within Misiones Province Location within Argentina
- Country: Argentina
- Province: Misiones Province

Government
  - Intendant: Mabel Pezoa
- Time zone: UTC−3 (ART)

Santa Ana (Misiones) is a town and municipality in Misiones Province in north-eastern Argentina.
