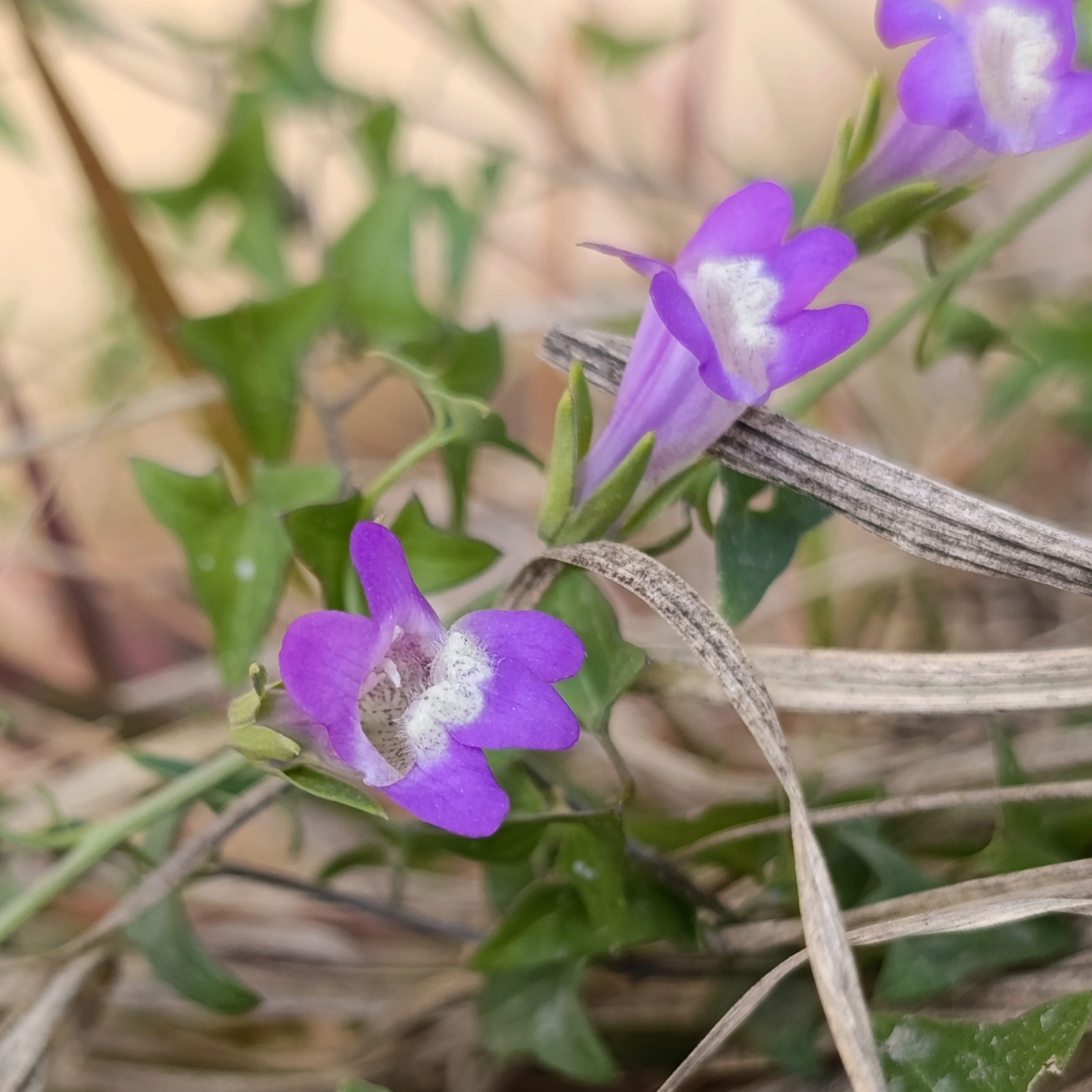
- In Mexico

Scientific classification
- Kingdom: Plantae
- Clade: Tracheophytes
- Clade: Angiosperms
- Clade: Eudicots
- Clade: Asterids
- Order: Lamiales
- Family: Plantaginaceae
- Genus: Maurandella (A.Gray) Rothm. (1943)
- Species: M. antirrhiniflora

Binomial name
- Maurandella antirrhiniflora (Humb. & Bonpl. ex Willd.) Rothm. (1943)

Synonyms
- Antirrhinum antirrhiniflorum (Humb. & Bonpl. ex Willd.) Hitchc. (1893); Antirrhinum maurandioides A.Gray (1868); Asarina antirrhiniflora (Humb. & Bonpl. ex Willd.) Pennell (1947); Ipomoea nealleyi J.M.Coult. (1890); Maurandella hederifolia Rothm. (1943); Maurandya antirrhiniflora Humb. & Bonpl. ex Willd. (1809); Maurandya antirrhiniflora subsp. hederifolia (Rothm.) Elisens (1985); Maurandya personata Lag. (1816); Usteria antirrhiniflora (Humb. & Bonpl. ex Willd.) DC. (1813)

= Maurandella =

Species of flowering plant

Maurandella antirrhiniflora, known as roving sailor or (along with other similar species) climbing snapdragon, is a species of flowering plant in the family Plantaginaceae. It is the sole species in genus Maurandella. It is a scrambling or climbing herbaceous perennial subshrub native to Mexico, the southwestern United States (California to Texas), Cuba, and the Turks and Caicos Islands, where it grows in a variety of relatively dry subtropical habitats.

== Description ==
It has more-or-less triangular untoothed leaves and tubular flowers in various shades of pink, red or blue to violet with white bases. Unlike species in the genus Maurandya, the flowers have closed "lips".

== Gallery ==
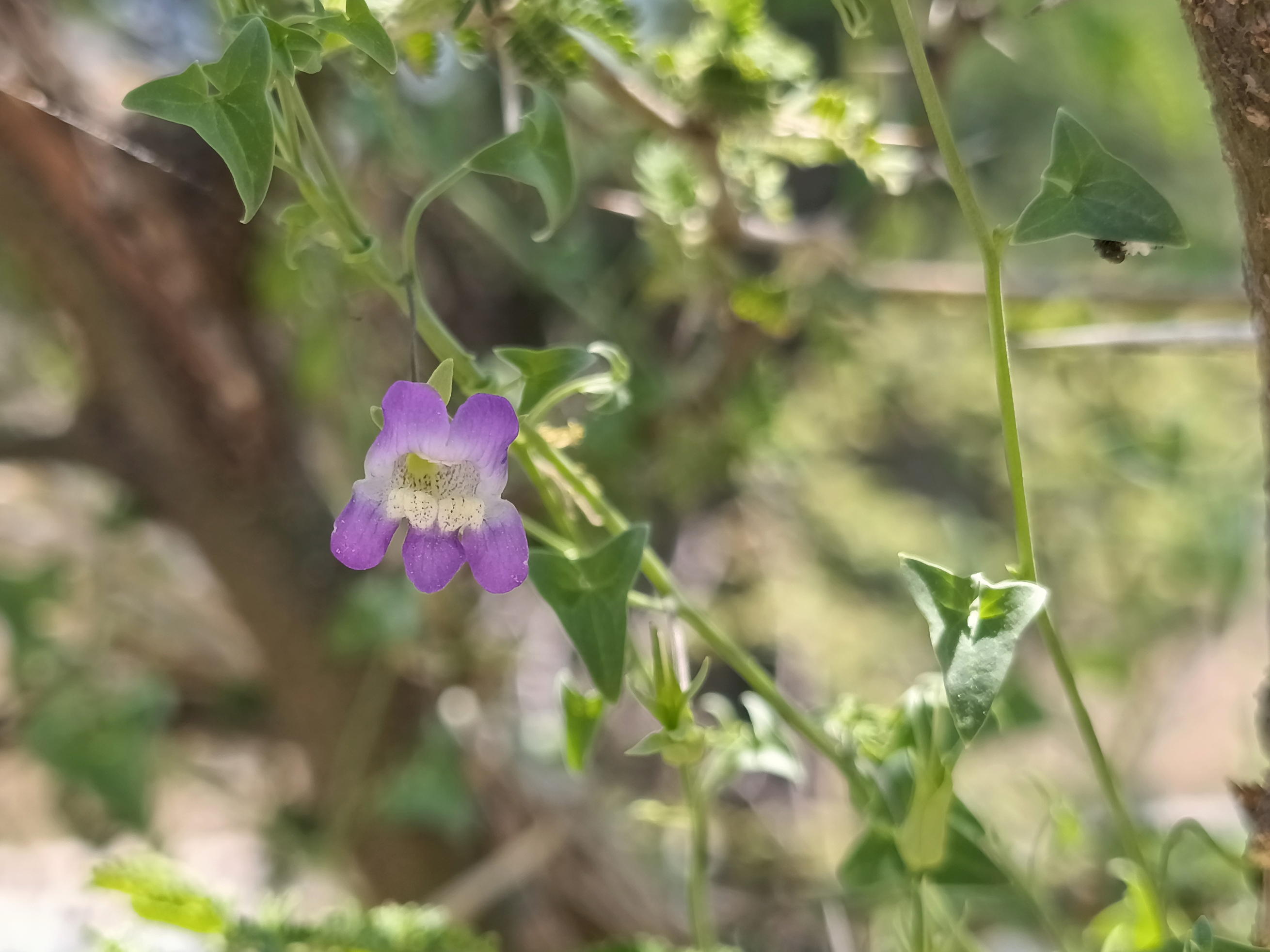
Flower

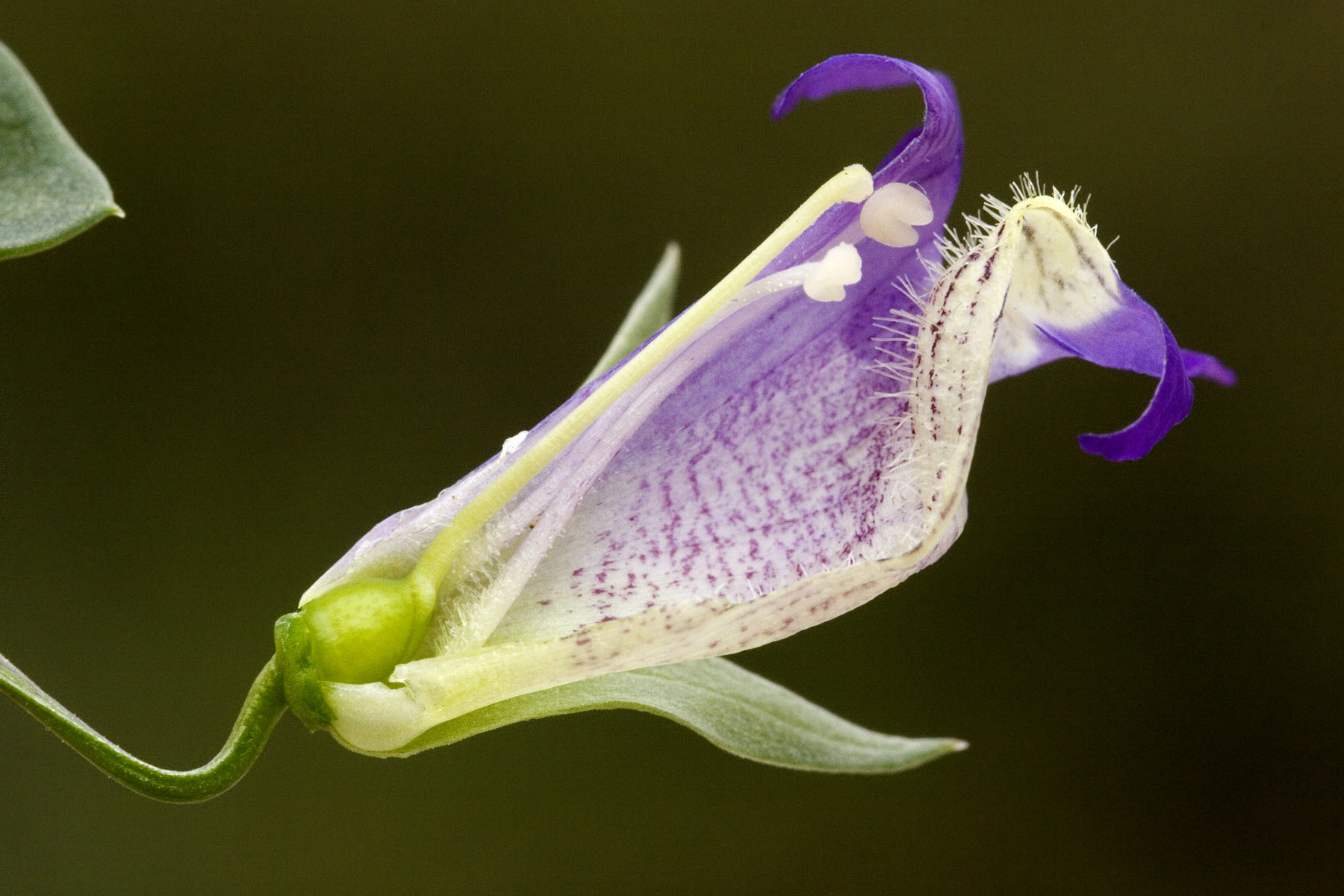
Flower section

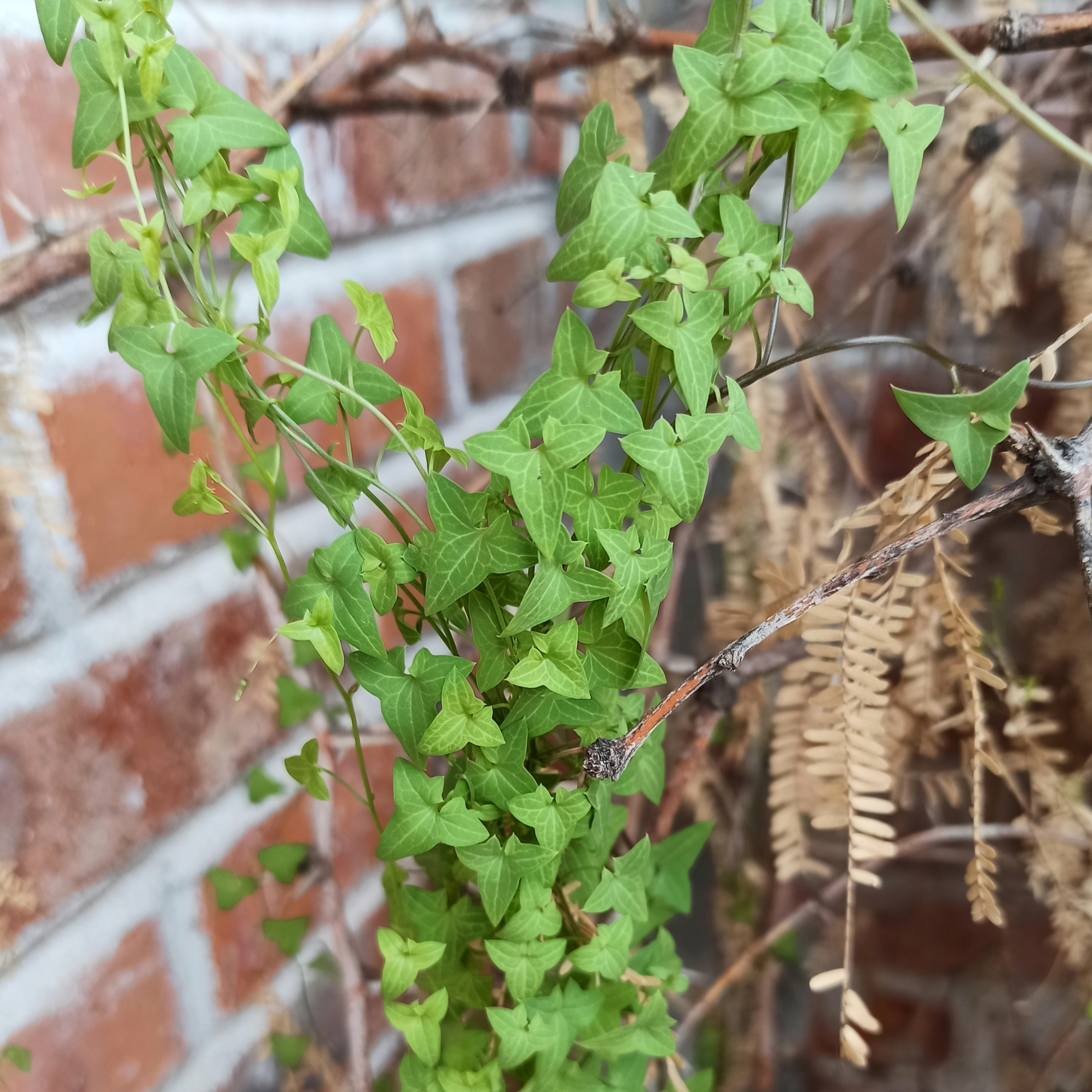
Leaves

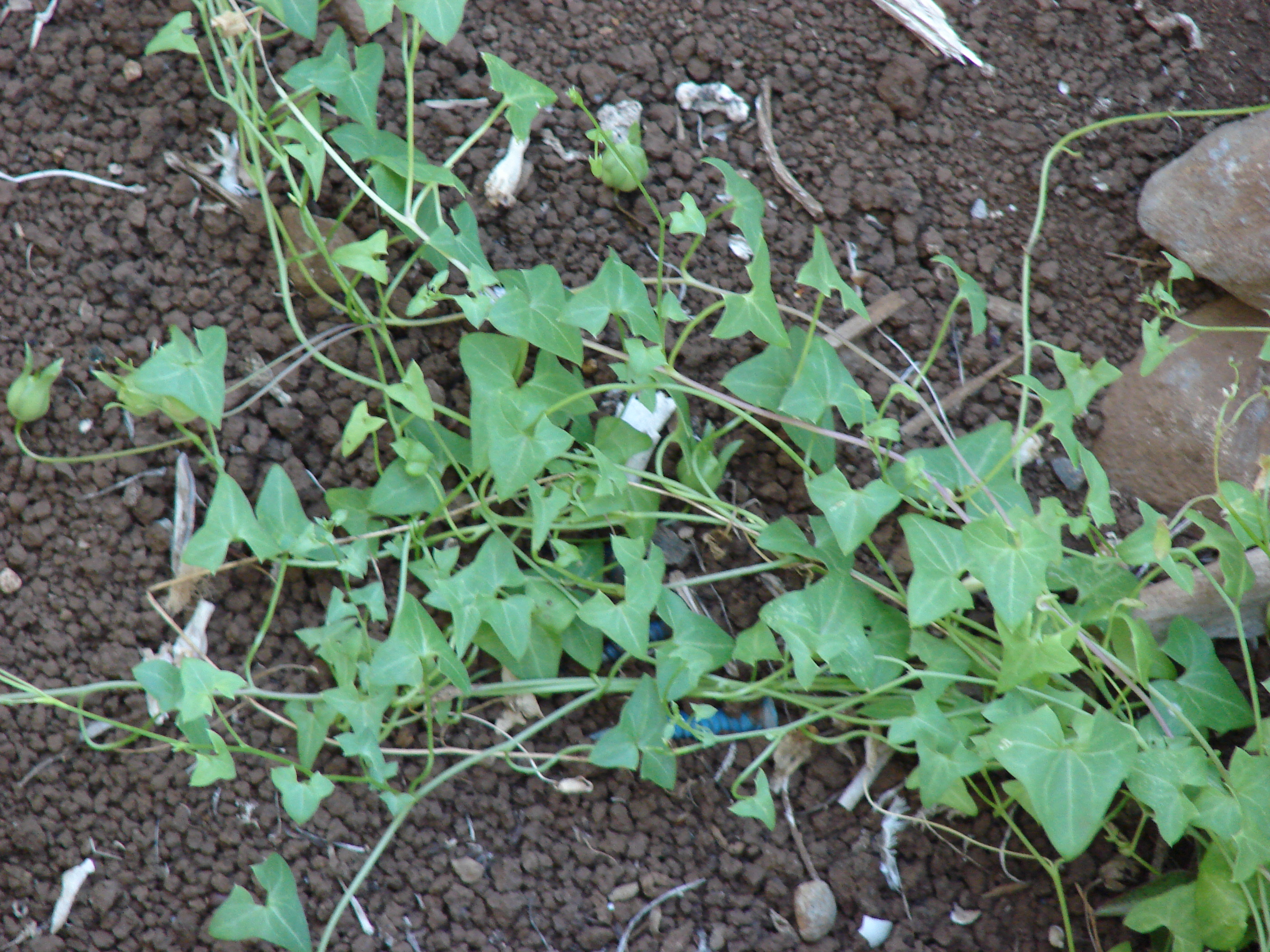
Crawling habit

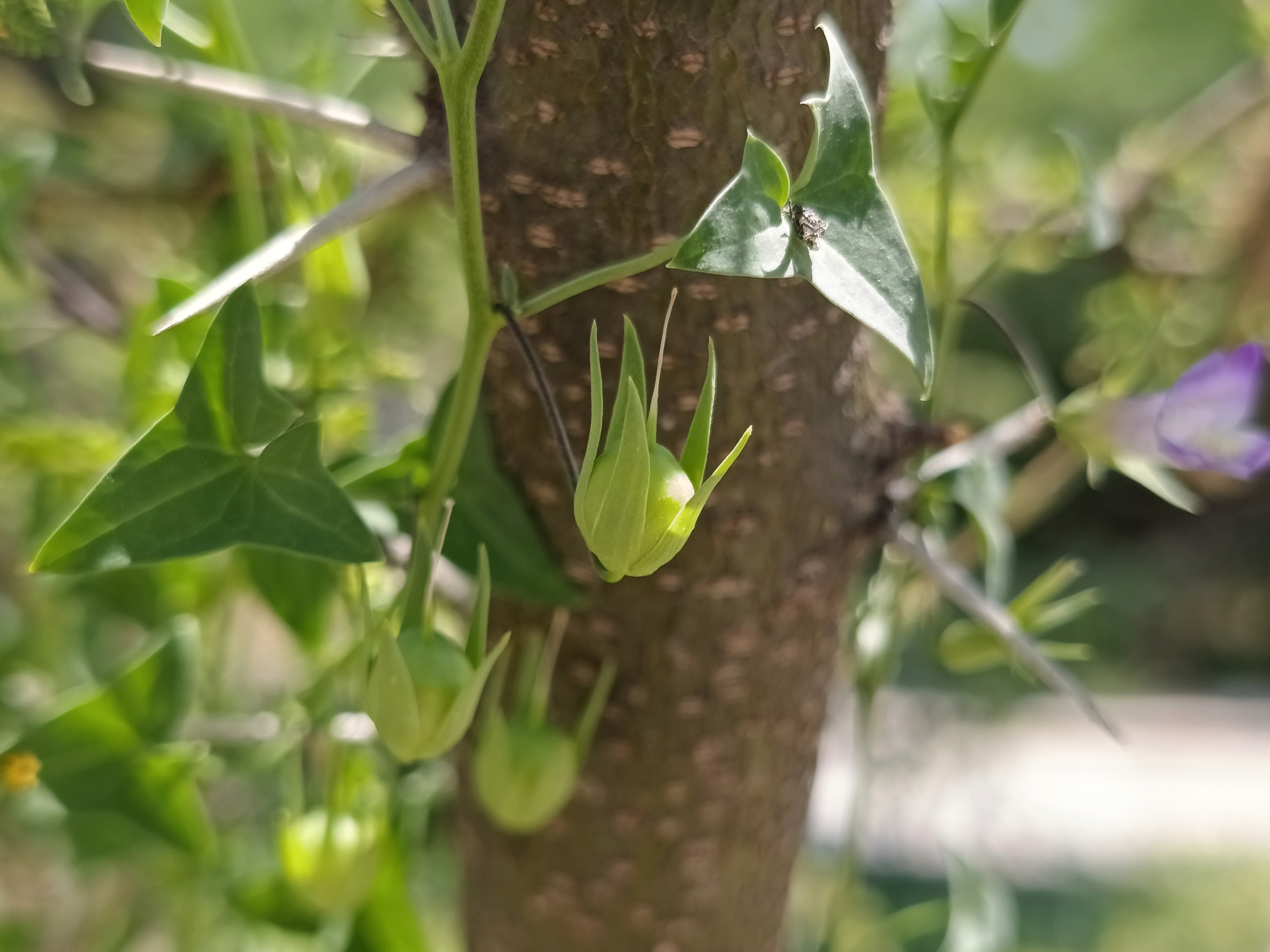
Fruit
