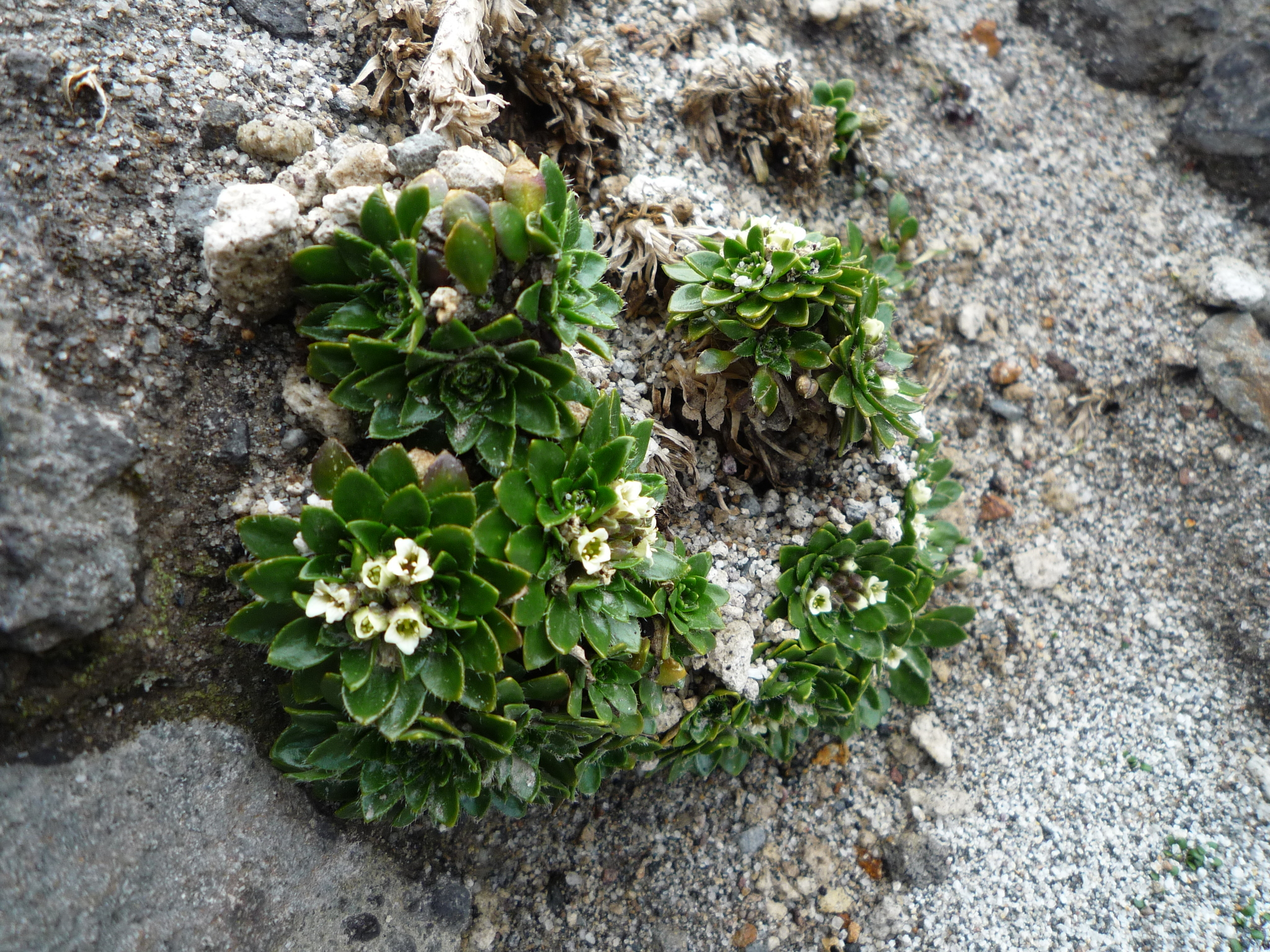

Conservation status
- Endangered (IUCN 3.1)

Scientific classification
- Kingdom: Plantae
- Clade: Tracheophytes
- Clade: Angiosperms
- Clade: Eudicots
- Clade: Rosids
- Order: Brassicales
- Family: Brassicaceae
- Genus: Borealandea
- Species: B. nubigena

Binomial name
- Borealandea nubigena (Bonpl.) Al-Shehbaz, Salariato, A.Cano & Zuloaga

Synonyms
- Aschersoniodoxa chimborazensis Gilg & Muschl.; Brayopsis remyana (Wedd.) Gilg & Muschl.; Draba nubigena (Bonpl.) Desv.; Eudema nubigena Bonpl. (1813) (basionym); Eudema nubigena subsp. remyana (Wedd.) Al-Shehbaz; Eudema remyana (Wedd.) O.E.Schulz; Eutrema bonplandii Spreng.; Hesperis nubigena (Bonpl.) Kuntze; Hesperis remyana (Wedd.) Kuntze; Sisymbrium nubigenum (Bonpl.) Wedd.; Sisymbrium remyanum Wedd.; Valeriana pygmaea Turcz.

= Borealandea nubigena =

Species of flowering plant

Borealandea nubigena (synonym Eudema nubigena) is a species of flowering plant in the family Brassicaceae. It is found only in Ecuador. It is native to very high elevation superpáramos from 4,000 to 4,500 meters elevation, where it grows on cliffs and in rocky areas. It is threatened by habitat loss.
