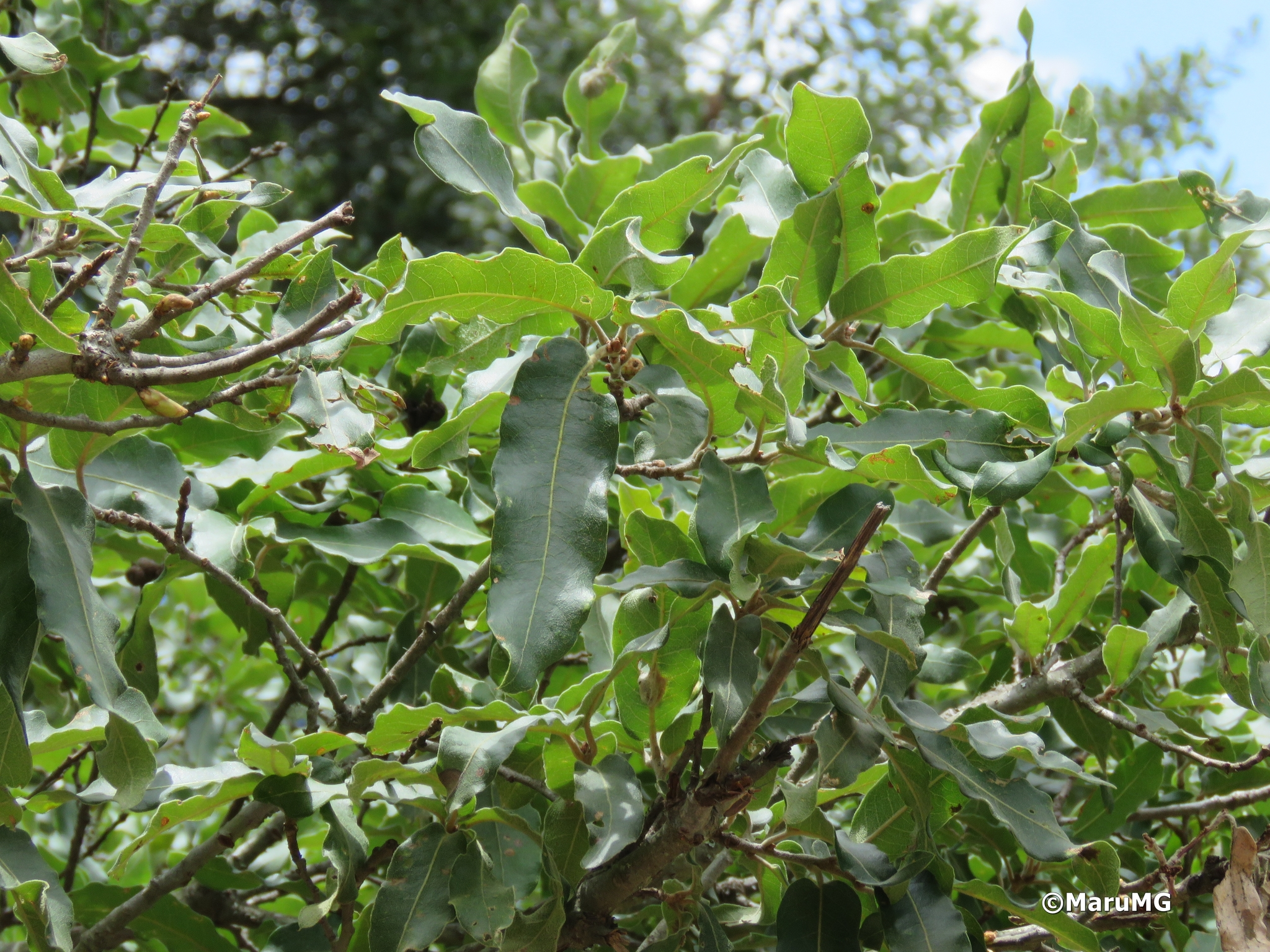

Conservation status
- Least Concern (IUCN 3.1)

Scientific classification
- Kingdom: Plantae
- Clade: Embryophytes
- Clade: Tracheophytes
- Clade: Spermatophytes
- Clade: Angiosperms
- Clade: Eudicots
- Clade: Rosids
- Order: Fagales
- Family: Fagaceae
- Genus: Quercus
- Subgenus: Quercus subg. Quercus
- Section: Quercus sect. Lobatae
- Species: Q. mexicana

Binomial name
- Quercus mexicana Bonpl.

Synonyms
- List: Quercus castanea var. integra Oerst.; Quercus castanea var. mexicana (Bonpl.) A.DC.; Quercus malifolia Trel.; Quercus mexicana f. bonplandii Trel.; Quercus mexicana f. lanulosa Trel.; Quercus mexicana f. perfertilis Trel.; Quercus pablillensis C.H.Mull.; Quercus rugulosa M.Martens & Galeotti; Quercus rugulosa f. subtruncata Trel.; Quercus sipuraca Trel.

= Quercus mexicana =

Species of oak tree

Quercus mexicana is a species of oak. It is widespread in eastern Mexico from Chiapas to Tamaulipas.

== Description ==
It is a deciduous tree growing up to 15 metres (49 feet) tall with gray bark. The leaves are thick and leathery, up to 12 centimetres (4 3/4 inches) long, oblong or lance-shaped with no teeth or lobes.

== Etymology ==
Mexicana means 'from Mexico'.
