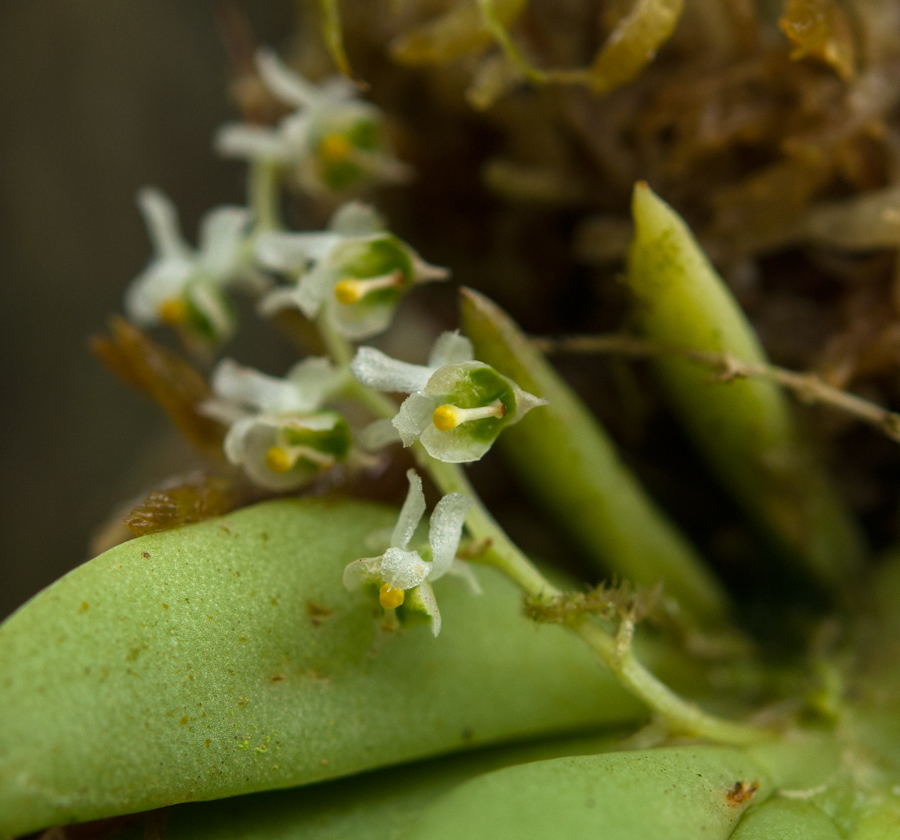
- Ornithocephalus manabina

Scientific classification
- Kingdom: Plantae
- Clade: Tracheophytes
- Clade: Angiosperms
- Clade: Monocots
- Order: Asparagales
- Family: Orchidaceae
- Subfamily: Epidendroideae
- Tribe: Cymbidieae
- Subtribe: Oncidiinae
- Genus: Ornithocephalus; Hook. (1824)

Type species
- Ornithocephalus gladiatus Hook. (1824)

Synonyms
- Sphyrastylis Schltr.; Oakes-Amesia C.Schweinf. & P.H.Allen

= Ornithocephalus (plant) =

Genus of orchids

Ornithocephalus is a genus of orchids comprising more than 50 known species widespread in South America, Central America, southern Mexico, Trinidad and the Windward Islands.

Species accepted as of June 2014:

1. Ornithocephalus alfredoi Archila & Chiron
2. Ornithocephalus archilarum Chiron
3. Ornithocephalus aristatus Pupulin & Dressler
4. Ornithocephalus aurorae D.E.Benn. & Christenson
5. Ornithocephalus bicornis Lindl. in G.Bentham
6. Ornithocephalus biloborostratus Salazar & R.González
7. Ornithocephalus bonitensis (Dodson) Toscano
8. Ornithocephalus brachyceras G.A.Romero & Carnevali
9. Ornithocephalus brachystachyus Schltr.
10. Ornithocephalus bryostachyus Schltr.
11. Ornithocephalus cascajalensis Archila
12. Ornithocephalus castelfrancoi Pupulin
13. Ornithocephalus caveroi D.E.Benn. & Christenson
14. Ornithocephalus ciliatus Lindl.
15. Ornithocephalus cochleariformis C.Schweinf.
16. Ornithocephalus cryptanthus (C.Schweinf. & P.H.Allen) Toscano & Dressler.
17. Ornithocephalus cujeticola Barb.Rodr.
18. Ornithocephalus dalstroemii (Dodson) Toscano & Dressler
19. Ornithocephalus dodsonii R.Vásquez & T.Krömer
20. Ornithocephalus dolabratus Rchb.f.
21. Ornithocephalus dressleri (Toscano) Toscano & Dressler
22. Ornithocephalus dunstervillei Toscano & Carnevali
23. Ornithocephalus ecuadorensis (Garay) Toscano & Dressler
24. Ornithocephalus escobarianus (Garay) Toscano & Dressler
25. Ornithocephalus estradae Dodson
26. Ornithocephalus falcatus Focke
27. Ornithocephalus garayi (D.E.Benn. & Christenson) Toscano & Dressler
28. Ornithocephalus gladiatus Hook.
29. Ornithocephalus grex-anserinus Dressler & Mora-Ret.
30. Ornithocephalus hoppii (Schltr.) Toscano & Dressler
31. Ornithocephalus inflexus Lindl.
32. Ornithocephalus iridifolius Rchb.f. in W.G.Walpers
33. Ornithocephalus kalbreyerianus Kraenzl.
34. Ornithocephalus lankesteri Ames
35. Ornithocephalus lehmannii Schltr.
36. Ornithocephalus longilabris Schltr.
37. Ornithocephalus manabina Dodson
38. Ornithocephalus micranthus Schltr.
39. Ornithocephalus minimiflorus Senghas
40. Ornithocephalus montealegreae Pupulin
41. Ornithocephalus myrticola Lindl.
42. Ornithocephalus numenius Toscano & Dressler
43. Ornithocephalus obergiae Soto Arenas
44. Ornithocephalus oberonioides (Schltr.) Toscano & Dressler
45. Ornithocephalus patentilobus C.Schweinf.
46. Ornithocephalus polyodon Rchb.f.
47. Ornithocephalus powellii Schltr.
48. Ornithocephalus suarezii Dodson
49. Ornithocephalus torresii Salazar & Soto Arenas
50. Ornithocephalus tripterus Schltr.
51. Ornithocephalus tsubotae (P.Ortiz) Toscano & Dressler
52. Ornithocephalus urceilabris (P.Ortiz & R.Escobar) Toscano & Dressler
53. Ornithocephalus valerioi Ames & C.Schweinf.
54. Ornithocephalus vasquezii Dodson
55. Ornithocephalus zamoranus Dodson
