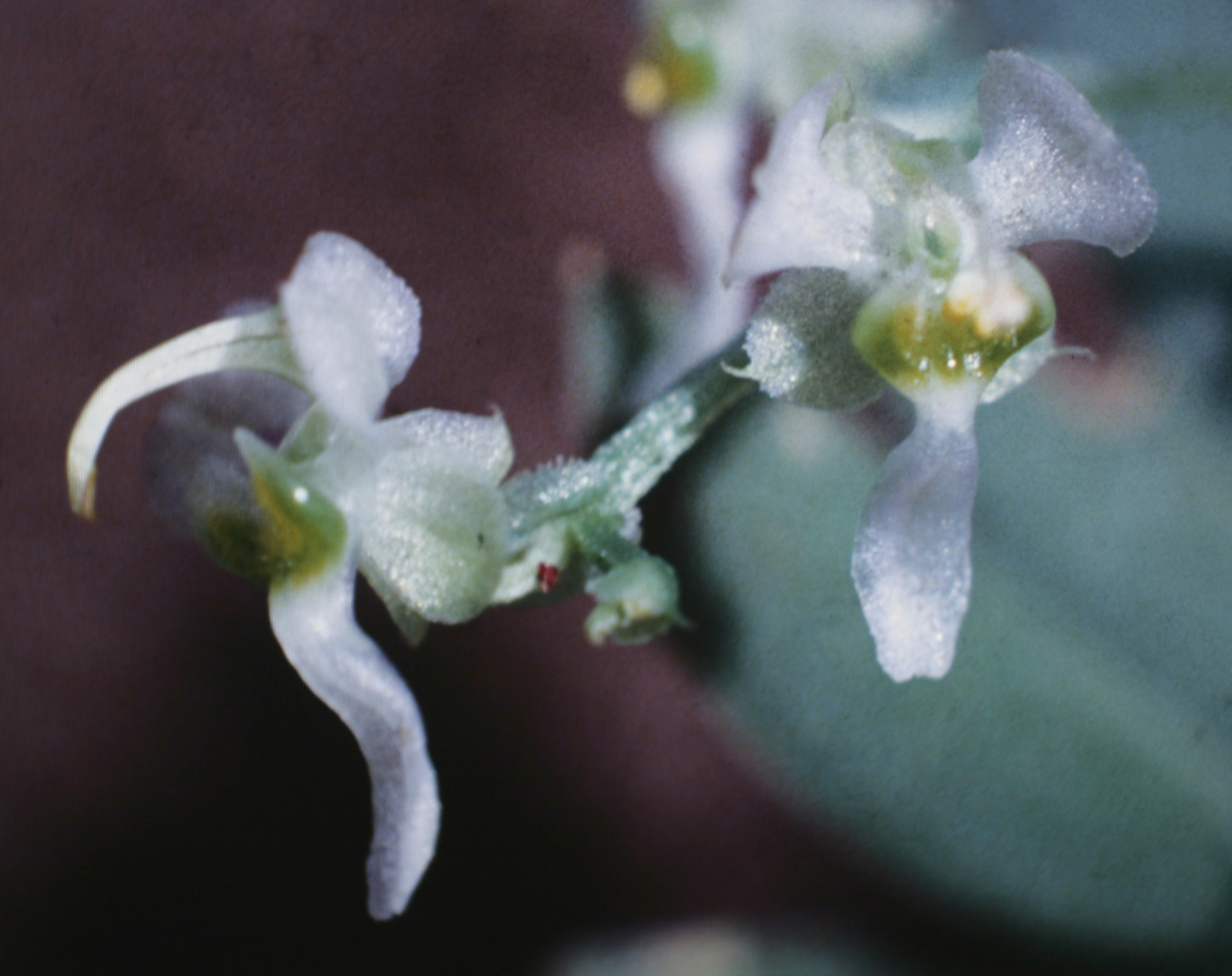

Scientific classification
- Kingdom: Plantae
- Clade: Tracheophytes
- Clade: Angiosperms
- Clade: Monocots
- Order: Asparagales
- Family: Orchidaceae
- Subfamily: Epidendroideae
- Genus: Ornithocephalus
- Species: O. gladiatus

Binomial name
- Ornithocephalus gladiatus Hook.

Synonyms
- Ornithocephalus bonplandii Rchb.f.; Ornithocephalus ibis Rchb.f.; Ornithocephalus gladiatus var. peruvianus C.Schweinf.

= Ornithocephalus gladiatus =

Species of orchid

Ornithocephalus gladiatus is a species of orchid found from Grenada, Trinidad, the Guianas, Venezuela, Ecuador, Peru, Bolivia and Brazil.
