= Quercus depressa =

Conservation status
- Least Concern (IUCN 3.1)

Scientific classification
- Kingdom: Plantae
- Clade: Tracheophytes
- Clade: Angiosperms
- Clade: Eudicots
- Clade: Rosids
- Order: Fagales
- Family: Fagaceae
- Genus: Quercus
- Subgenus: Quercus subg. Quercus
- Section: Quercus sect. Lobatae
- Species: Q. depressa

Binomial name
- Quercus depressa Humb. & Bonpl.

Species of oak tree

Quercus depressa is a species of red oak endemic to Mexico, including the states of Hidalgo, Oaxaca, Puebla, and Veracruz.

== Description ==
The tree is usually less than 1.2 meters tall. The evergreen leaves are 2 to 4 centimeters long and 1 to 2 centimeters wide. The leaves shape ranges from elliptic to elliptic-oblong. The apex is acute, acuminate, and aristate. The base is either rounded or cuneate. The margin is either entire or with 1 to 7 pairs of teeth. The leaves are hairless on the top, or rarely have some stellate trichomes near base of midrib. The leaves have 5 to 8 pairs of secondary veins, which are either prominent or flat adaxially. The male catkins are from 2.5 to 4.5 centimeters long. The acorns are 0.9 to 1.3 centimeters long, which are either ovoid or almost globose. They mature after 2 years, from August to November. The bark is greyish and finely fissured. The twigs are slender, gray, and hairless. The buds are 1 to 3 millimeters long, and either glabrous or nearly so.
