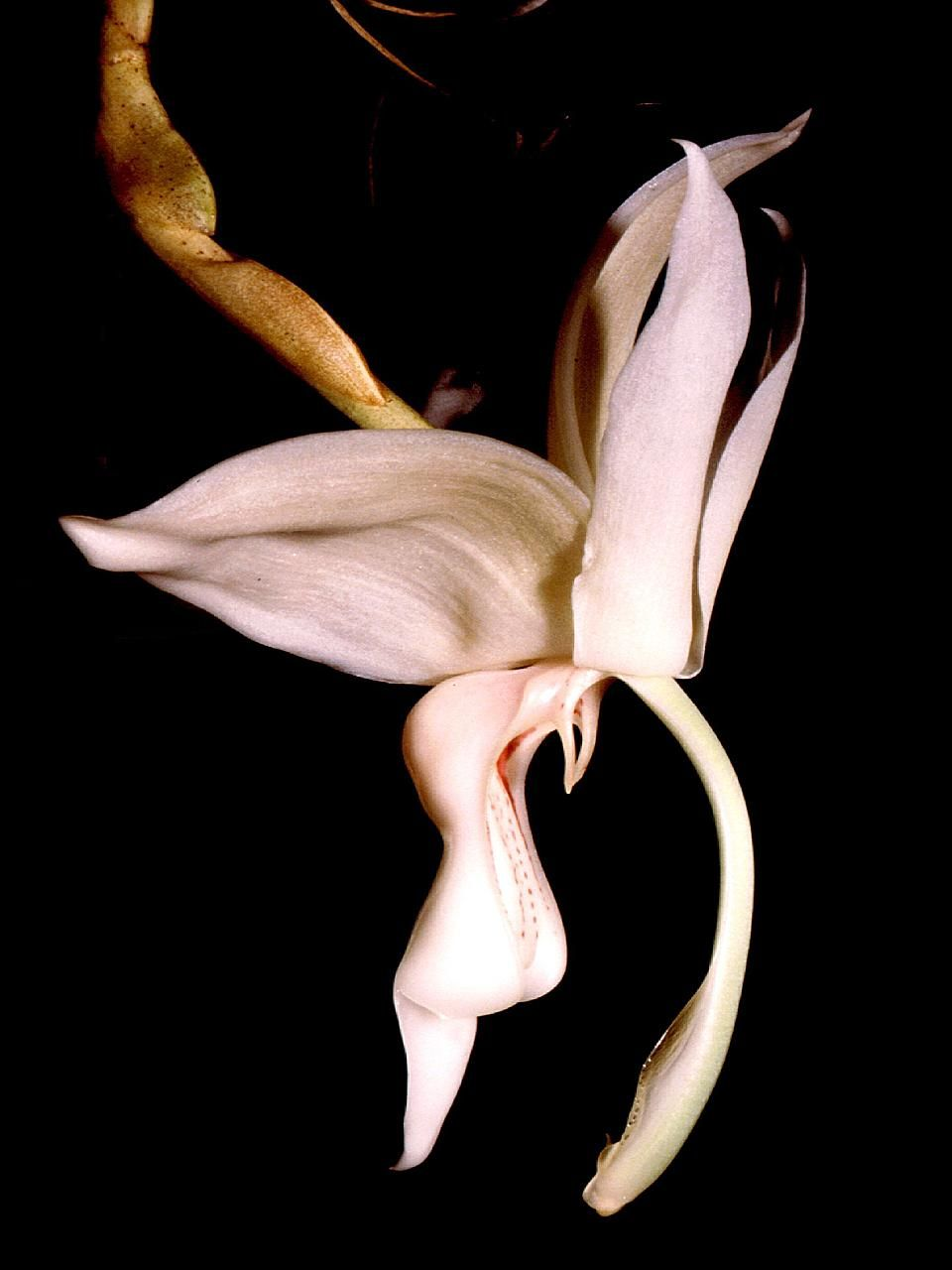
- Stanhopea grandiflora flower

Scientific classification
- Kingdom: Plantae
- Clade: Tracheophytes
- Clade: Angiosperms
- Clade: Monocots
- Order: Asparagales
- Family: Orchidaceae
- Subfamily: Epidendroideae
- Genus: Stanhopea
- Species: S. grandiflora

Binomial name
- Stanhopea grandiflora (Lodd.) Lindl.

= Stanhopea grandiflora =

Species of plant

Stanhopea grandiflora (Lodd.) Lindl. is a species of orchid occurring from Trinidad to southern tropical America.

Initially described as Ceratochilus grandiflorus by Loddiges, it was transferred to the genus Stanhopea by Lindley ; it must not be confused with another species that was later invalidly given the same name (Stanhopea grandiflora (Humb. & Bonpl.) Rchb.f.) by H. G. Reichenbach, but is now Stanhopea jenischiana Kramer ex Rchb.f. .
