= Paris Interuniversity Library of Health =

Interuniversity Health Library of Paris
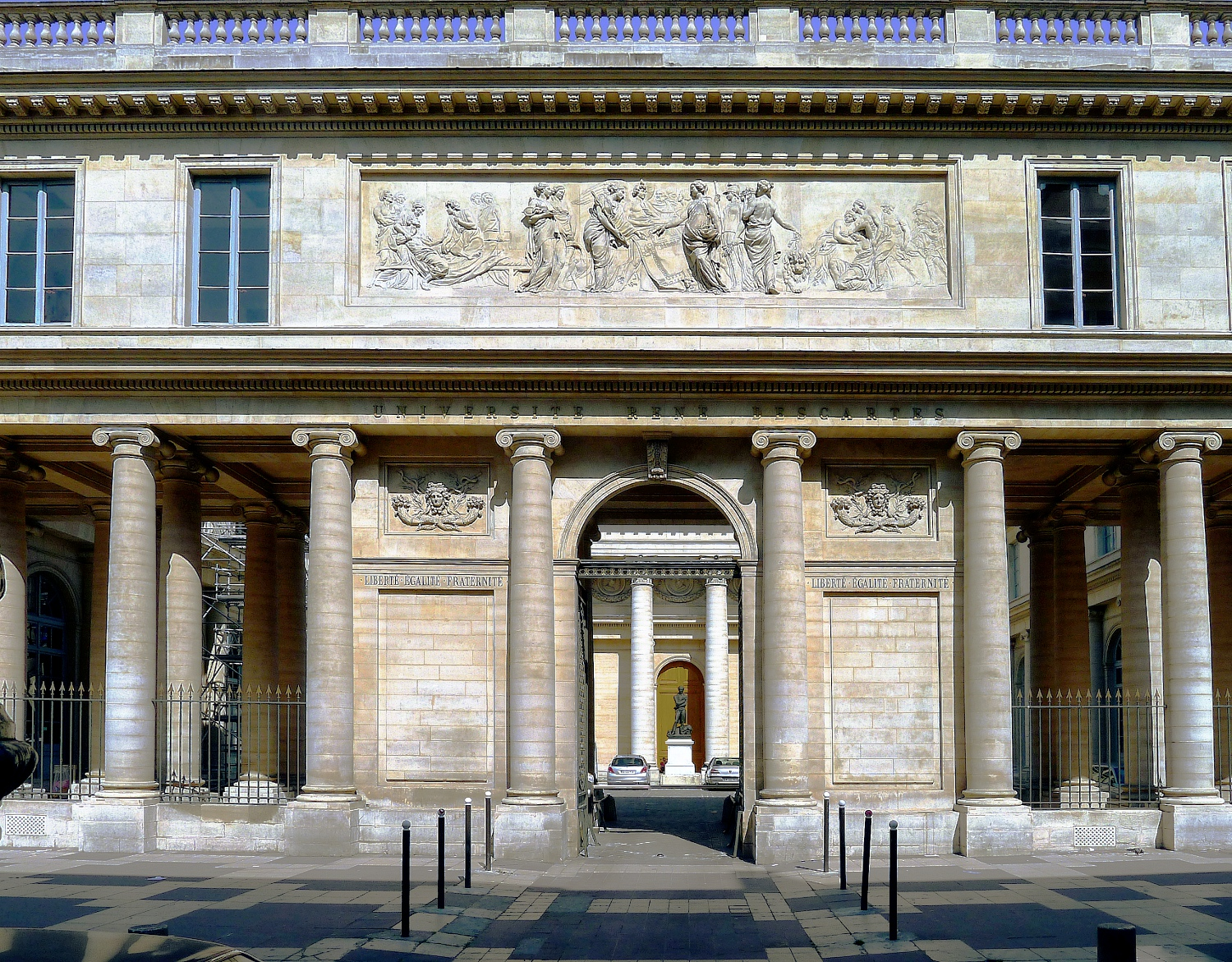
- 48.8512°N 2.3407°E
- Location: 12, rue de l’École de Médecine, Paris, France
- Established: 1391 : Library of the Paris Faculty of Medicine; 2011 : BIU Medicine
- Branch of: Paris Cité University

Collection
- Size: 550,000 books, 20,000 periodicals, 1,300 manuscripts

Other information
- Website: u-paris.fr/en/libraries

The Interuniversity Health Library (French: Bibliothèque interuniversitaire de Santé) is an inter-university medical library part of the network of 20 libraries of the Paris Cité University, in Paris, France. It is the heir to the library of the former Faculty of Medicine of the University of Paris, whose origins date back to 1391.

It offers collections in medicine, dentistry, pharmacy and related sciences. The Interuniversity Library of Health resulted from the merging of two other institutions in 2011: the Bibliothèque interuniversitaire de médecine et d'odontologie (BIUM) and the Bibliothèque interuniversitaire de pharmacie (BIUP), even though the two sites remain distinct.

== History ==
=== The interuniversity Library of Medicine (BIUM) ===
The BIUM ("Bibliothèque interuniversitaire de médecine") used to be the Library of the Faculty of Medicine of Paris, which was settled in the Middle Ages at "rue de la Bûcherie" and then "rue Jean-de-Beauvais". The Faculty was removed in 1793. But the National Convention established a Medical School in the former Academy of Surgery, in a building constructed by Jacques Gondouin. Scattered after the closing of the Faculty, the collections were rebuilt by the surgeon and librarian Pierre Sue. They were joined by other holdings from the former Academy of Surgery, the French Royal Society of medicine and some of the Capital's literary works.

During the 19th century and a major part of the 20th century (until the beginning of the 1970s), the library was known as the Library of the Faculty of Medicine of Paris. Its holdings have been increasing since then.

=== The interuniversity Library of Pharmacy (BIUP) ===
The history of the collection of the "Bibliothèque interuniversitaire de Pharmacie" (BIUP) goes back to 1570, when four masters of the community of apothecaries and grocers donated works to their corporation. The Common Library's collection was enhanced by other donations from the guards of the community. Until 1777, when the "Collège de Pharmacie de France" was created. In 1803, the holdings of work and archives went under the responsibility of the secretary of the School of Pharmacy and some teachers (in particular Nicolas Gaston Guibourt).

Librarians weren't required by the School of Pharmacy until 1878. Then the post is formalized in February 1882. In the same year, the School and the library moved from the "Jardin des apothicaires", "rue de l'Arbalète", to the Faculty of Pharmacy in Paris, "avenue de l'Observatoire".

As the establishment's librarian between 1884 and 1922, the doctor and historian Paul Dorveaux (1851–1938) left a long-lasting imprint on it thanks to the organization of a policy of conservation and acquisition. This policy concerned current scientific production as well as ancient works and manuscripts.

It was under the directions of the doctor and historian Paul Dorveaux (1936–1961) and Yvonne Ruyssen (1961–1973) that the Library experienced new changes: the growing number of staff, the reorganization of the premises and the opening of a new reading room (the Dorveaux room) in 1958.

=== Since 1972 ===
After the University of Paris' break-up the two libraries and the Scientific Library were integrated in 1972 the "Bibliothèque interuniversitaire d'Île de France" granted under decree 72–132 of 10 February.

By the decree 78-1122 of 16 November 1978, each of these libraries regained their autonomy under the respective names of "Bibliothèque interuniversitaire de medecine"(BIUM) and 'Bibliothèque interuniversiaire de pharmacie" (BIUP).The two entities pertain to the Paris Descartes University. But the Interuniversity Library is a common service for Pierre-and-Marie-Curie University, and Paris Diderot University, while the BIUP is a common service for the University of Paris-Sud.

The merging of these two libraries was decided in September 2009 and became effective in 2011.

== Status and operations ==
The Library is governed by a convention agreed between the Universities of Paris Descartes, Diderot and Paris-Sud. It is administratively attached to Paris-Descartes University. It is run by a librarian, the latest being Guy Cobolet (general curator).

The BIU Santé is a CADIST (French acronym for center of acquisition and dissemination of scientific and technical information) for medicine, odontology and cosmetology. It is also an associated center of the National Library of France for medicine and pharmacy.

As a research library, the BIU Santé is especially dedicated to students, researchers and teachers within health disciplines, including psychology. It greets every non-academic health professional and every person who conducts researches matching its collections.

The site dedicated to medicine and odontology is established in the old Faculty of Médecine of Paris, "rue de l'Ecole-de-Médecine. These premises shelter the presidency of Paris-Descartes University and the History of Medicine Museum.

The site dedicated to Pharmacy is part of the old premises of the Faculty of Pharmacy in Paris. A reading room for students (Fialon room) opened in 1991.

Readership : 16 000 registered physical users; 130 000 Net surfers consult the library's website every month, 60% of them live abroad.

== Architecture ==
The medical and odontological pole shelters two reading rooms:

- The first public space of the library was Louis Landouzy's reading room. It currently has the library's collections of odontology.
- Located alongside the boulevard Saint-Germain, the great hall was inaugurated in 1891. It was built by Léon Ginain. The architect made a point of honor to see that this hall was six meters longer than Saint-Genevieve Library's. In 1908, its floor was raised to allow the building of another storage space.

The center of medicine, odontology and cosmetology is currently under construction. It includes two reading rooms:

- The Dorveaux room, in the north wing.
- The Fialon room, in the south wing.

== Collections ==
The « BIU Santé » is a reference library recognized at the international level in medical field. It also owns the total of French dissertations in medicine and dental surgery and keeps one copy of each. The Parisian dissertations collection goes back to 1539. The BIU Santé is the depositary of the legal deposits covering works of medicine and dentistry. The whole collection is one of the three richest in the world, with the National Library of Medicine (USA) and the Wellcome Library (London).

To gain more room, the BIU Santé delivered a part of its collections to the "Centre technique du livre de l'enseignement supérieur" (technical book center for higher education), also called CTLes. It mostly concerns dissertations from French provinces or foreign countries and magazines written in non-Latin characters.

=== Medicine-odontology ===
- More than 400 000 printed works
- Near 16 000 French and foreign periodicals and 2 000 are currently ongoing.
- Many electronic resources (electronic documents, databases, online periodicals, websites)

=== History of health ===
- 1.118 manuscripts
- 3.000 works from the 16th century, 6.700 from the 17th, 16.000 from the 18th and 130.000 from the 19th
- Drawings, engravings, photographs and medals

=== Pharmacy-biology, cosmetology ===
- More than 88.000 volumes ;
- More than 4.000 serial publications (periodicals and collections)
- 204 manuscripts

=== Electronic Library ===
The website of the BIU Santé includes:

- A modern section (catalogues, databases, online question-and-answer service available on the website BIUMINFO, remote supply of documents, 15 000 bookmarks, etc.)
- And Medic@, a patrimonial electronic library which provides online access to corpus of texts concerning the history of medicine, dentistry, pharmacy and health in general, from the 15th to the 20th century. These texts are completed by other documentary products and services (a database containing 85.000 images, virtual exhibitions, a biography and bibliographic database of doctors, electronic publication of thesis and congresses, websites of learned societies).

A scientific magazine called "e-Mémoires de l'Académie nationale de Chirurgie" is published by the BIU Santé in collaboration with the National Academy of Surgery.

== List of the directors ==
The directors are curators and most of them are librarians.

=== Library of Medicine ===
- Pierre Sue (1794–1808)
- Louis-Jacques Moreau de la Sarthe (1808–1822)
- Patrice Mac-Mahon (1823–1835)
- Jean-Eugène Dezeimeris (1836–1852)
- Jacques Raige-Delorme (1852–1876)
- Achille Chéreau (1876–1885)
- François-Louis Hahn (1885–1920)
- Victor-Lucien Hahn (1920–1937)
- Alfred-André Hahn (1937–1970)
- Paule Dumaître (1971–1979)
- Yvonne Guéniot (1979–1989)
- Pierrette Casseyre (1990–1999)
- Guy Cobolet (2000–2010)

=== Library of Pharmacy ===
- Oswald Goepp (1878–1879)
- Gabriel Le Mercier (1879–1884)
- Paul Dorveaux (1884–1922)
- Louis Barrau-Dihigo (1922–1925)
- Charles Beaulieux (1926–1931)
- Maurice Bernard (1931–1936)
- Gabriel Garnier (1936–1961)
- Yvonne Ruyssen (1961–1973)
- Paul Roux-Fouillet (1974–1977)
- Marie-Edmée Michel (1977–1989)
- Françoise Malet (1989–1999)
- Odile Rohou (2000–2003)
- Christiane Baryla (2003–2006)
- Laurence Boitard (2006–2009)
- Françoise Boucheron (interim director, 2009–2010)

=== BIU Santé ===
- Guy Cobolet (2011–2018)
- Arnauld Sillet et Sabine Labare (since 2018)

== See also ==
- List of libraries in France
