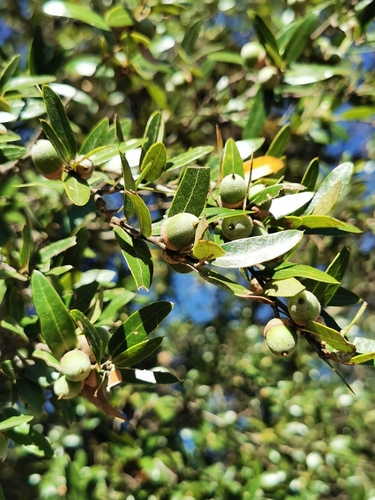

Conservation status
- Least Concern (IUCN 3.1)

Scientific classification
- Kingdom: Plantae
- Clade: Embryophytes
- Clade: Tracheophytes
- Clade: Spermatophytes
- Clade: Angiosperms
- Clade: Eudicots
- Clade: Rosids
- Order: Fagales
- Family: Fagaceae
- Genus: Quercus
- Subgenus: Quercus subg. Quercus
- Section: Quercus sect. Lobatae
- Species: Q. eduardi

Binomial name
- Quercus eduardi Trel.

Synonyms
- Quercus eduardi f. cespitifera Trel.; Quercus nitidissima Trel.; Quercus oligodonta Seemen ex Loes., non Saporta (1879), fossil name

= Quercus eduardi =

Species of tree

Quercus eduardi (also spelt Quercus eduardii) is a species of oak tree. Q. eduardi is found in Sierra Fría, Aguascalientes, Mexico, between 2,200 and 2,600 metres (7,200 and 8,500 feet) above sea level. It is placed in Quercus section Lobatae.
