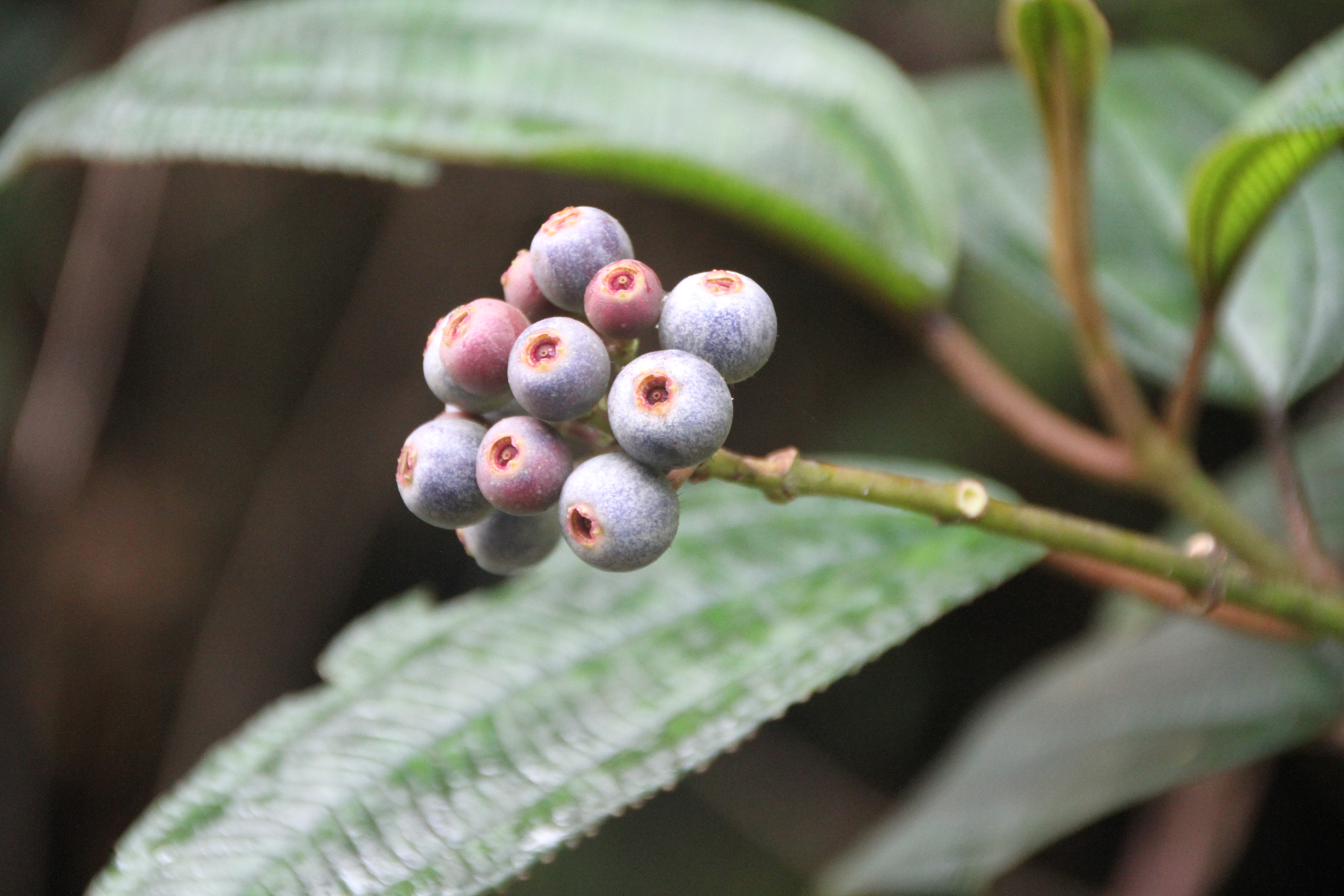

Conservation status
- Least Concern (IUCN 3.1)

Scientific classification
- Kingdom: Plantae
- Clade: Tracheophytes
- Clade: Angiosperms
- Clade: Eudicots
- Clade: Rosids
- Order: Myrtales
- Family: Melastomataceae
- Genus: Miconia
- Species: M. mirabilis

Binomial name
- Miconia mirabilis (Aubl.) L.O.Williams

= Miconia mirabilis =

Species of plant

Miconia mirabilis, known as camsey cuatrocanales, is a species of flowering plant of the family Melastomataceae. It is found in Mexico, the Caribbean, and South America.

== Distribution ==
Miconia mirabilis is present from southwestern Mexico to southeastern Brazil. This range includes: Belize, Costa Rica, Guatemala, Honduras, and Nicaragua in Central America; Cuba, Dominican Republic, Haiti, the Leeward Islands, Puerto Rico, the Windward Islands, and Trinidad and Tobago in the Caribbean; and Colombia, Venezuela, Guyana, Suriname, French Guiana, andPeru in South America.

In Dominica it is common at low to mid-elevations (200–1000 m) in the wetter areas of the island. In Guadeloupe, Miconia mirabilis flowers after cyclones. In Puerto Rico, the plant can be found in woodlands and forests in wet/moist areas, ascending to higher elevations. In Venezuela, the trees grow in evergreen forests from plains to mountains, at altitudes of 50–1,300 m (as high as 1,600 m), and elsewhere mainly in humid lowland forests.

== Description ==
Miconia mirabilis is a tree that grows to a height of 5–20 m (16–65 ft).

The branches, the underside of the leaves, the inflorescences, and the bracts are moderately to completely covered with minute stellate or lepidote-stellate hairs. The leaf blades are elliptic to oval-elliptic, with a gradually acuminate apex and an acute to rounded base, generally measuring 10–15 × 4–7 cm; thin-ridged, with the upper surface glabrous, the lower surface in the axils of the primary veins usually sparsely barbed with hairs up to 1 mm long, with 5 (up to 7) ribs. The petioles are generally 2.5–5 cm long.

The panicle is usually 9–12 cm long and submultiflorous. The flowers are 5-merous (up to 6-merous), on pedicels 2–5 mm long, subtended by a pair of broadly elliptic to obovate-elliptic deciduous bracts 5–8 mm (up to 15 mm) long, arranged in umbels on the terminal branches. The glabrous hypanthium is 3–4.2 mm long. The calyx is 1–1.8 mm long and wavy-lobed, 0.4–0.6 mm in diameter. The outer teeth are obscure and completely adnate. The torus is moderately polu-silky inside. The petals are white, 7–9 × 2.5–3.5 mm, narrowly obovate-oblong, and pruinose-granulose. The stamens are slightly dimorphic, generally glabrous, with thecae 6–8 mm long, subulate. The stigma is capitate. The style is slightly stellate-pubulose at the base and glandular-setular. The ovary is 3 (up to 5) locular, moderately stellate-pubulose at the apex.

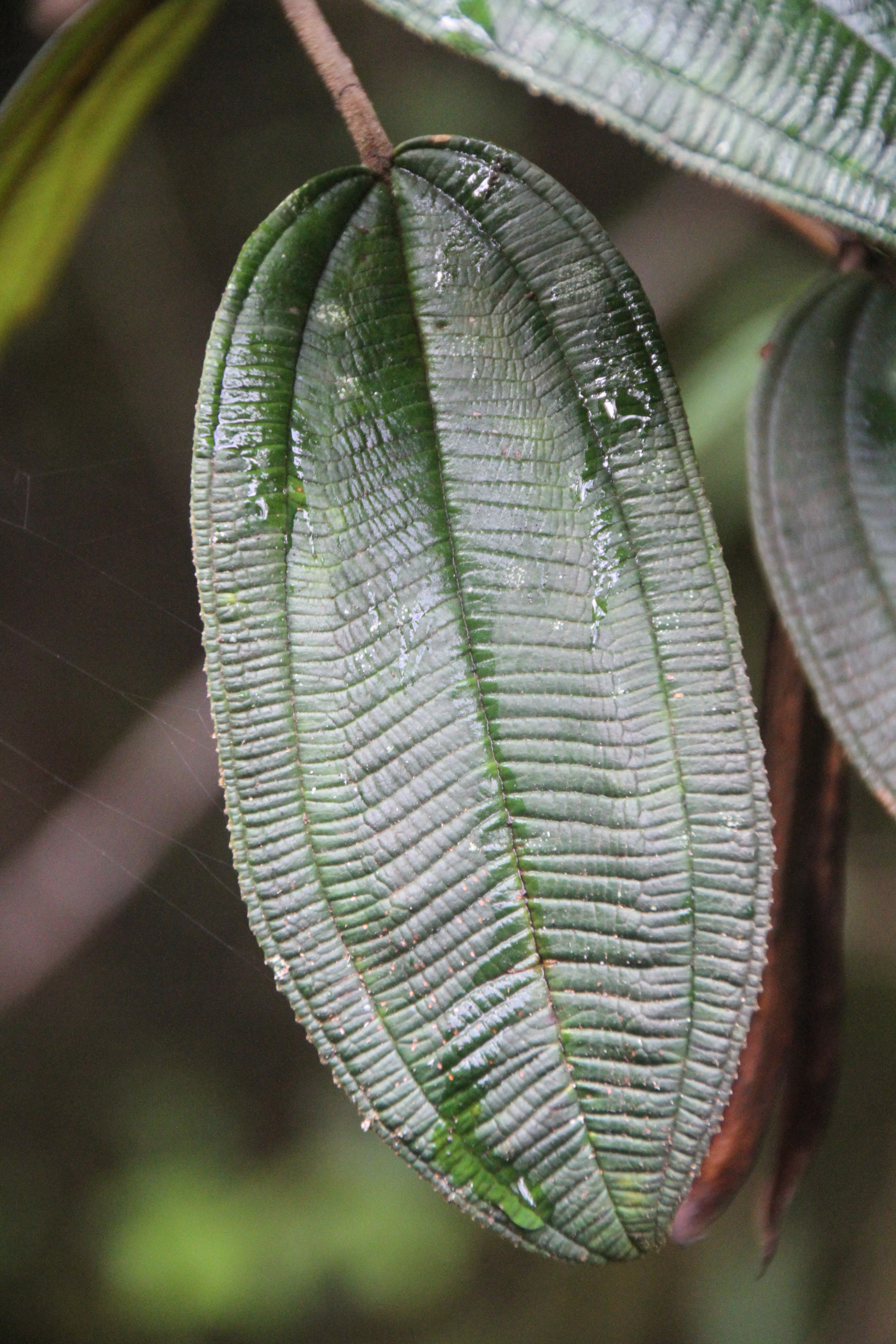

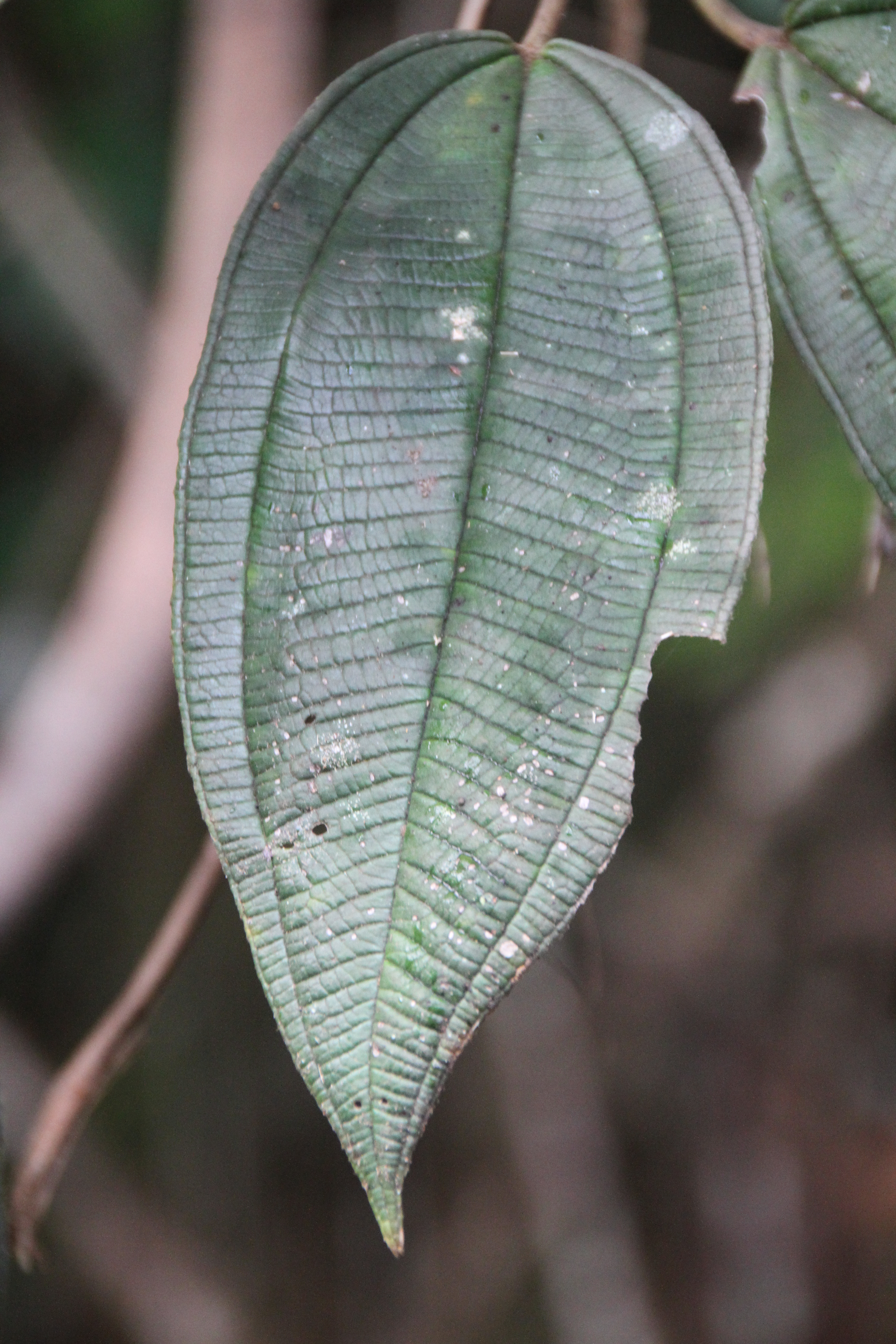

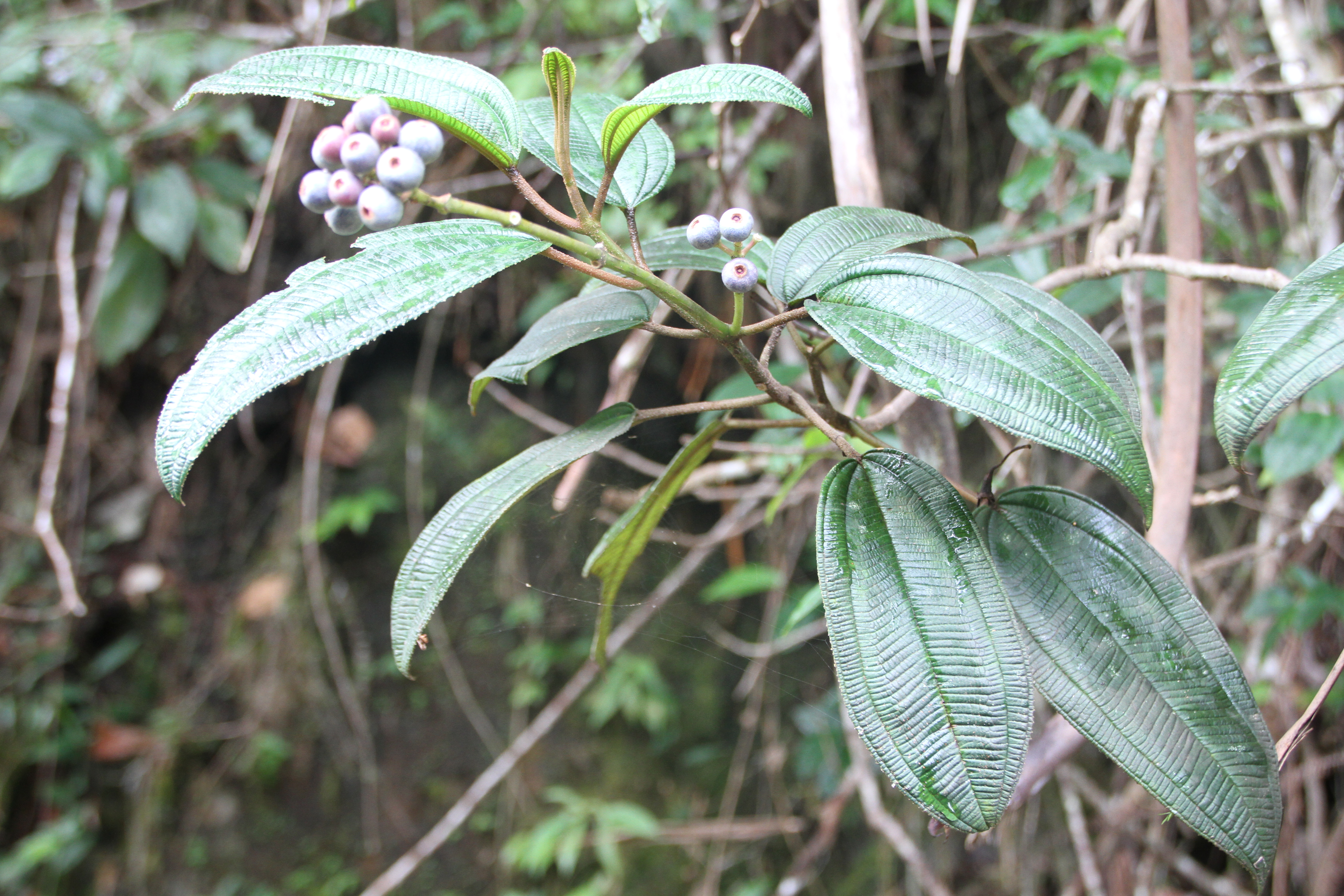

== Common names ==
Miconia mirabilis has many common names, varying linguistically and regionally. Below is a non-exhaustive list, by language and/or region.

French Antillean Creole names

- bois cotelette (Guadeloupe)
- bois cotte (Saint Lucia)
- bois crécré (Dominica)
- côtelette blanc (Martinique)
- cré-cré (Dominica, Martinique)

Haitian Creole names

- crécré-falaise (Haiti)
- grand crécré (Haiti)
- macrio (Haiti)

Portuguese names

- tinteiro (Brazil)

Spanish names

- camasey (Puerto Rico)
- camasey blanco (Puerto Rico)
- camasey cuatrocanales (Puerto Rico)
- camasey de costilla (Puerto Rico)
- capirote blanco (Honduras)
- manzano (Venezuela)
- tresfilos (Dominican Republic)
- sirin manzana (Belize, Honduras, Nicaragua)

Various names in the Guianas

- basterd mispel (Surinamese Dutch)
- busimusupu (Aucan/Ndyuka language)
- itaraballi (Arawak/Lokono language)
- kuyakeng ereparë / kuyakeng ereparï (Carib/Kalina language)
- mesupu (Paramaccan/Ndyuka language)
- mispel (Surinamese Dutch)
- pasakawara / psakawara (Carib/Kalina language)
- piemplsi (Carib/Kalina language)
- pihpisi ereparë / pimpisi ereparï (Carib/Kalina language)
- waraia (Arawak/Lokono language)
- wakaladang / wakaradan (Arawak/Lokono language)

== First species description ==
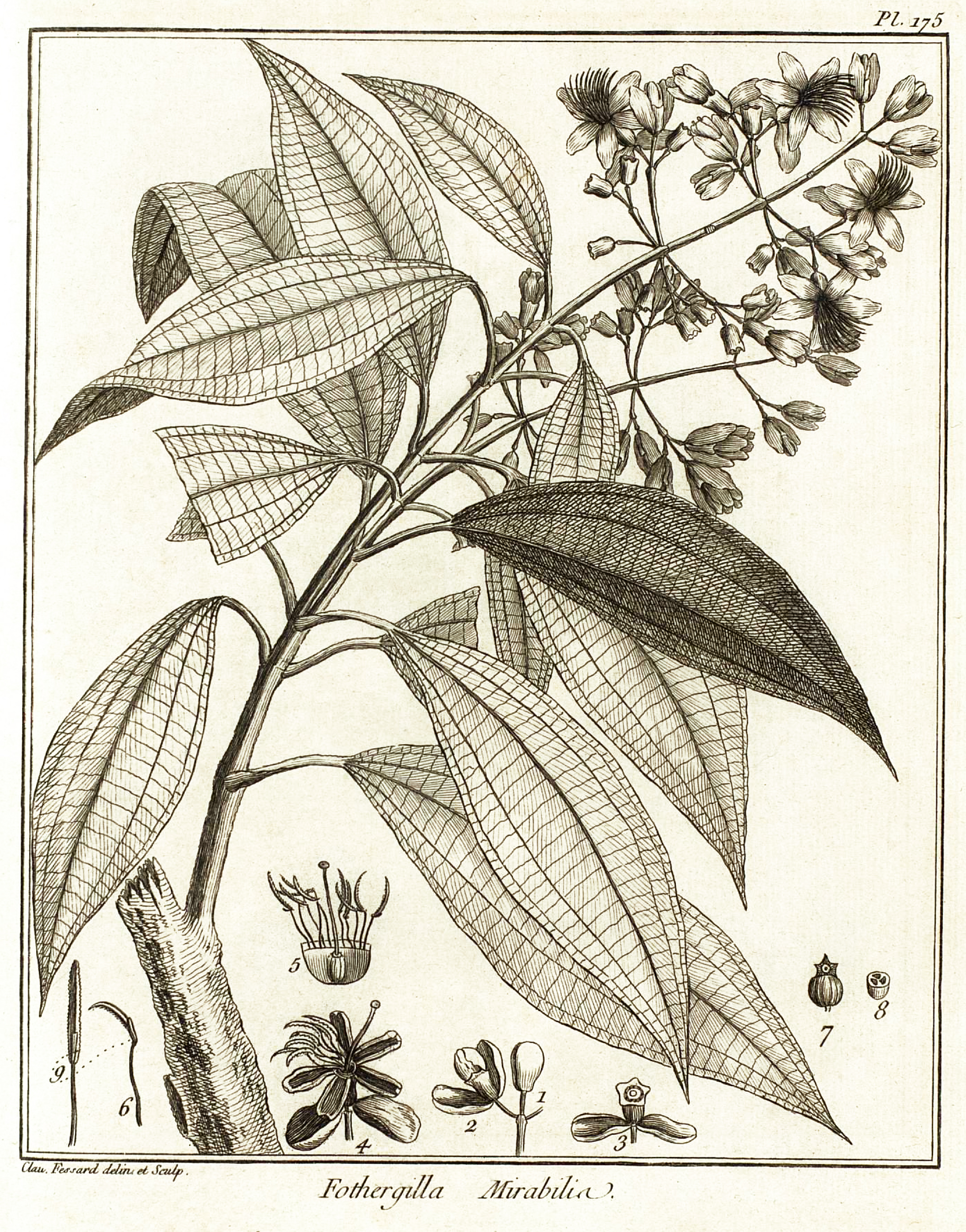
Miconia mirabilis per Aublet (1775), translated from French: 1. Flower bud enclosed between two scales. - 2. Bud & flower & the two scales seen separately. - 3. Calyx. Two scales - 4. Blooming flower. - 5. Open calyx. Stamen. Ovary, Style. Stigma. - 6. Stamen. - 7. Berry. - 8. Berry cross-section. - 9. Gland at the base of the anther.

In 1775, the botanist Jean Baptiste Christophore Fusée Aublet described Miconia mirabilis in the following protologue: (Note: Protologue has been translated from the original French, with the assistance of machine translation. The original Latin has been kept in Latin (italicized). To read the original French, see.)

FOTHERGILLA mirabilis. (Tabula 175.)

Arbor mediocris, trunco quadri aut quinque-pedali, in ſummitate ramoſo ; ramis & ramulis nodoſis, tetragonis, angulis obtuſis. Folia oppoſita, quinque-nervia, ovato-oblonga, acuta, integenima, ſuperne è flavo virentia, infernè tomentoſa, ſubrufeſcentia, petiolata. Flores racemoſi, terminales, racemulis oppoſitis.

Florebat, fructumque ferebat Julio.

Habitat in ſylvis Caiennæ & Guianæ.

"THE ADMIRABLE FOTHERGILLA of Guiana. (PLATE 175.)"

This tree is of medium size; its trunk rises four to five feet, and its diameter is about four to five centimeters. It is covered with gray bark; its wood is white and brittle. Long, reddish, branching limbs with four obtuse angles, bearing opposite leaves in pairs, arranged in a cross, grow from t he end of the trunk. They are smooth, oval, ending in a long point, yellowish-green above, and covered below with a light tawny [down, marked with five longitudinal veins and several intermediate transverse veins; the largest are six to seven inches long and three inches wide. Their pedicle is one inch long, grooved on its upper surface, and convex below.

The flowers are borne on large, scattered clusters that terminate the branches and twigs.

The calyx is covered at its base with two small, notched leaves or scales; It is bell-shaped, rounded at the base, and flared at the limb, which is a reddish leaf with five obtuse teeth.

The petals are five in number, oval, slightly notched, white, and attached by a yellow or red tab between the teeth of the calyx.

The stamens, ten in number, are arranged on a disc below the point where the petals are inserted. Their filaments are yellow, flattened, five lines long, and bear an anther of the same length, at the base of which is a glandular body, one line long, positioned externally; this anther has two pouches, each of which opens into two valves.

The pistil is a rounded ovary, surmounted by a style which is covered with hairs at intervals, and terminates in a rounded, broad, and spongy stigma.

The ovary, together with the calyx, becomes a slightly succulent berry, divided into three compartments by membranous septa, and filled with tiny seeds.

The juice of the leaves is successfully applied to the stings of fish spines.

This tree was in bloom and bearing fruit in July when I observed it on Cayenne Island. I also encountered it during my travels through the interior of Guiana.

— Fusée-Aublet, 1775.

== See also ==
- List of Miconia species
