= List of Miconia species =

Miconia is a large genus of tropical and subtropical New World flowering shrubs and trees in the family Melastomaceae. As of January 2025, there are over 1,900 species accepted in Kew's Plants of the World Online.

== Species ==
=== A ===
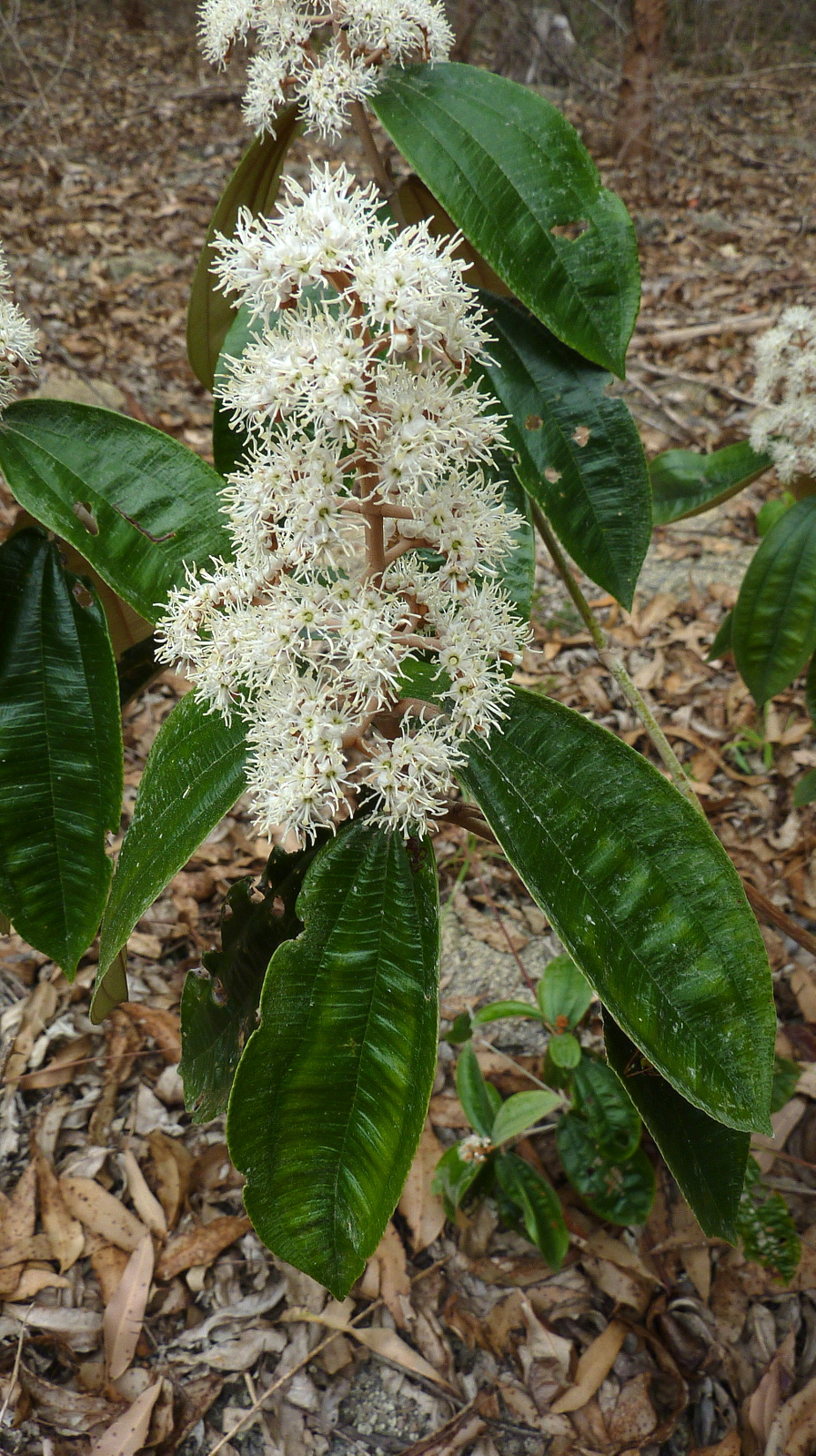
Miconia amoena

- Miconia abbottii (Urb.) Ionta & Judd
- Miconia abbreviata Markgr.
- Miconia ablusa (Wurdack) Michelang.
- Miconia abscondita Majure, Judd & Skean
- Miconia abysmophila Wurdack
- Miconia acalephoides Naudin
- Miconia acanthocoryne Wurdack
- Miconia acinodendron (L.) Sweet
- Miconia acostae (Wurdack) Michelang.
- Miconia acreana Ule
- Miconia acuminata (Steud.) Naudin
- Miconia acuminifera Triana
- Miconia acuminoides Skean, Judd & Majure
- Miconia acunae Borhidi
- Miconia acunagalei Judd, Bécquer & Majure
- Miconia acurensis (Wurdack) Michelang.
- Miconia acutiflora (Naudin) R.Goldenb.
- Miconia acutifolia Ule
- Miconia acutilamina Michelang.
- Miconia acutipetala Sprague
- Miconia adamantinensis (Brade) R.Goldenb.
- Miconia adenocalyx Urb. & Ekman
- Miconia adenothrix (Cogn.) R.Goldenb.
- Miconia adinantha Wurdack
- Miconia adrienii J.F.Macbr.
- Miconia adventitia Michelang.
- Miconia aenigmatica Wurdack
- Miconia aequatorialis Wurdack
- Miconia aeruginosa Naudin
- Miconia affinis DC.
- Miconia aggregata Gleason
- Miconia agrestis (Aubl.) Baill.
- Miconia aguaclarensis (Wurdack) Michelang.
- Miconia aguilarii (Kriebel & Almeda) Gamba & Almeda
- Miconia aguirrei L.Uribe
- Miconia aguitensis Gleason
- Miconia alainii Judd & Skean
- Miconia alata (Aubl.) DC.
- Miconia alaticaulis Michelang.
- Miconia alatiflora Michelang.
- Miconia alatissima Gamba & Almeda
- Miconia alberti Gleason
- Miconia albertobrenesii Gamba & Almeda
- Miconia albertsmithii Michelang.
- Miconia albicans (Sw.) Steud.
- Miconia albiviridis Urb. & Ekman
- Miconia alboglandulosa Gamba & Almeda
- Miconia alborosea L.Uribe
- Miconia alborufescens Naudin
- Miconia aligera Wurdack
- Miconia aliquantula Wurdack
- Miconia allardii (Wurdack) Michelang.
- Miconia allenii (Almeda) Almeda
- Miconia alloeotricha (Urb.) Judd, Penneys & Skean
- Miconia almedae (Kriebel) Michelang.
- Miconia alpestris Cogn. ex Donn.Sm.
- Miconia alpina Cogn.
- Miconia alternans Naudin
- Miconia alternidomatia Michelang.
- Miconia alternifolia (Griseb.) Alain
- Miconia alternilamina Michelang.
- Miconia alterninervia (Cogn.) R.Goldenb.
- Miconia altomacaensis (Baumgratz & D'El Rei Souza) R.Goldenb.
- Miconia alypifolia Naudin
- Miconia amabilis Cogn.
- Miconia amacurensis Wurdack
- Miconia amapaensis R.Goldenb. & Hinoshita
- Miconia amazonica Triana
- Miconia amblyandra Naudin
- Miconia amilcariana Almeda & Dorr
- Miconia amissa Wurdack
- Miconia amnicola Wurdack
- Miconia amoena Triana
- Miconia amorimii (Reginato & R.Goldenb.) R.Goldenb.
- Miconia ampla Triana
- Miconia amplexicaulis Naudin
- Miconia amplilamina Michelang.
- Miconia amplinodis Umaña & Almeda
- Miconia amplipedunculata Almeda & O.Ortiz
- Miconia amygdaloides (DC.) R.Goldenb.
- Miconia anaectocalyx Michelang.
- Miconia anchicayensis Gamba & Almeda
- Miconia ancistrophora Triana
- Miconia andersonii Fawc. & Rendle
- Miconia andreana Cogn.
- Miconia androsaemifolia Griseb.
- Miconia angelana R.Romero & R.Goldenb.
- Miconia angulata (Griseb.) M.Gómez
- Miconia angustidentata Almeda & Penneys
- Miconia angustifolia (Sw.) Griseb.
- Miconia angustilamina (Judd & Skean) Judd & Ionta
- Miconia anisophylla Triana
- Miconia anisotricha (Schltdl.) Triana
- Miconia annulata (Naudin) Triana
- Miconia anoriensis (L.Uribe) Michelang.
- Miconia antioquiensis Wurdack
- Miconia aphanantha (Naudin) Michelang.
- Miconia apiculata Urb. & Ekman
- Miconia apleura (Urb. & Ekman) Judd & Bécquer
- Miconia aplostachya (Bonpl.) DC.
- Miconia aponeura Triana
- Miconia appendiculata Triana
- Miconia approximata Gamba & Almeda
- Miconia aprica Gleason
- Miconia aptera (DC.) R.Goldenb.
- Miconia araguensis Wurdack
- Miconia araneifera (Markgr.) Michelang. & R.Goldenb.
- Miconia arboricola Almeda
- Miconia arbutifolia Naudin
- Miconia archeri Wurdack
- Miconia argentea (Sw.) DC.
- Miconia argentimuricata Majure & Judd
- Miconia argyrophylla DC.
- Miconia aristata Gleason
- Miconia aristigera (Naudin) R.Goldenb. & Michelang.
- Miconia ascendens Wurdack
- Miconia ascenditricha Judd, Bécquer & Majure
- Miconia asclepiadea Triana
- Miconia aspera (Cogn.) R.Goldenb.
- Miconia aspergillaris (Bonpl.) Naudin
- Miconia asperifolia (Naudin) Majure & Judd
- Miconia asperiuscula (DC.) R.Goldenb.
- Miconia asperrima Triana
- Miconia asplundii Wurdack
- Miconia aspratilis Wurdack
- Miconia astrocalyx Meirelles & R.Goldenb.
- Miconia astroplocama Donn.Sm.
- Miconia astrotricha (DC.) Triana
- Miconia asymmetrica Michelang.
- Miconia atlantica Caddah & R.Goldenb.
- Miconia atrata (Spring) Wawra
- Miconia atrofusca Cogn.
- Miconia atropilis Cogn. & Gleason
- Miconia atropurpurea Gamba & Almeda
- Miconia atroviridis (Cogn.) R.Goldenb.
- Miconia attenuatifolia Michelang.
- Miconia augustgrisebachii Ionta & Judd
- Miconia augustkappleri Michelang.
- Miconia aulocalyx Mart. ex Triana
- Miconia aurantiaca (Almeda & Kriebel) Gamba & Almeda
- Miconia aurantipetala Michelang.
- Miconia aurea (D.Don) Naudin
- Miconia aureoides Cogn.
- Miconia auricoma (Spring ex Mart.) R.Goldenb.
- Miconia aurifolia Bécquer & Judd
- Miconia auritinoda Wurdack
- Miconia australis (Cham.) R.Goldenb.
- Miconia avia Wurdack
- Miconia axillaris (Macfad.) Skean, Judd & Majure
- Miconia axinaeoides Gleason
- Miconia ayacuchensis Wurdack
- Miconia ayangannensis (Wurdack) Michelang.
- Miconia ayisyena Skean, Judd & Majure
- Miconia aymardii Wurdack

=== B ===
- Miconia badilloi Michelang.
- Miconia bahiana R.Goldenb. & J.Coelho
- Miconia bahorucensis Skean, Judd & Majure
- Miconia bailloniana J.F.Macbr.
- Miconia baillonii M.Gómez
- Miconia bairdiana (Skean, Judd, Clase & Peguero) Skean & Judd
- Miconia balansae (Cogn.) R.Goldenb.
- Miconia balbisiana (Ser. ex DC.) Michelang.
- Miconia bangii Cogn.
- Miconia baracoana M.Gómez
- Miconia barahonensis (Urb. & Ekman) Ionta & Judd
- Miconia barbata (Borhidi) Judd, Bécquer & Majure
- Miconia barbeyana Cogn.
- Miconia barbinervis (Benth.) Triana
- Miconia barbipetiolata Michelang.
- Miconia barbipilis Gleason
- Miconia barclayana Wurdack
- Miconia barkeri Urb. & Ekman
- Miconia barkleyi (Wurdack) Michelang.
- Miconia basilensis Urb. & Ekman
- Miconia baumgratziana R.Goldenb. & C.V.Martin
- Miconia becqueri Judd & Majure
- Miconia bella Wurdack
- Miconia beneolens Wurdack
- Miconia benoistii Wurdack
- Miconia bensparrei Gamba & Almeda
- Miconia benthamiana Triana
- Miconia benthamii (Naudin) Michelang.
- Miconia bernardii Wurdack
- Miconia berryi Wurdack
- Miconia berteroi (DC.) Judd & Ionta
- Miconia biacuta Cogn.
- Miconia bicolor (Mill.) Triana
- Miconia biflora (Cogn.) Judd
- Miconia biformis Cogn.
- Miconia bigibbosa (Cogn.) Michelang.
- Miconia biglandulosa Gleason
- Miconia biglomerata (Bonpl.) DC.
- Miconia bilopezii Wurdack
- Miconia biolleyana (Cogn.) Gamba & Almeda
- Miconia bipatrialis Wurdack
- Miconia biperulifera Cogn.
- Miconia birimosa (Naudin) Skean, Judd & Majure
- Miconia bisecundiflora Ocampo & Almeda
- Miconia biserrata (DC.) Michelang.
- Miconia bissei (Bécquer) Bécquer & Michelang.
- Miconia bisulcata Urb.
- Miconia blakeifolia Gleason
- Miconia blancheana Urb.
- Miconia blepharodes (DC.) R.Goldenb.
- Miconia boekei (Wurdack) Gamba & Almeda
- Miconia bolivarensis Wurdack
- Miconia boliviensis Cogn.
- Miconia boomii Wurdack
- Miconia bordoncilloana Lozano & M.E.Morales
- Miconia borhidiana Judd, Bécquer & Majure
- Miconia borinquensis Skean, Judd & Majure
- Miconia borjensis Wurdack
- Miconia boxii Wurdack
- Miconia brachyanthera Triana
- Miconia brachybotrya Triana
- Miconia brachycalyx Triana
- Miconia brachycentra (Griseb.) M.Gómez
- Miconia brachygyna Gleason
- Miconia brachyloba (Urb.) Bécquer
- Miconia brachystemon (Urb.) Judd, Bécquer & Majure
- Miconia brackenridgei (A.Gray) R.Goldenb.
- Miconia bracteata (DC.) Triana
- Miconia bracteolata (Bonpl.) DC.
- Miconia bracteosa (Naudin) Michelang.
- Miconia bractiflora Gamba & Almeda
- Miconia bradeana Baumgratz & R.Goldenb.
- Miconia brasiliensis (Spreng.) Triana
- Miconia brenesii Standl.
- Miconia breteleri Wurdack
- Miconia breviflora (Cogn.) R.Goldenb.
- Miconia brevifolia (Urb. & Ekman) Skean & Judd
- Miconia brevipes Benth.
- Miconia brevis J.F.Macbr.
- Miconia brevistylis Cogn.
- Miconia brevitheca Gleason
- Miconia brigitteae Humberto Mend. & Posada-Herrera
- Miconia brittonii Cogn. ex Britton
- Miconia broadwayi (Urb.) Michelang.
- Miconia brunescens (Urb.) Bécquer & Skean
- Miconia brunnea DC.
- Miconia bubalina Naudin
- Miconia buddlejoides Triana
- Miconia bullata (Turcz.) Triana
- Miconia bullatifolia Michelang.
- Miconia bullifera (Mart. & Schrank ex DC.) Michelang.
- Miconia bullosa (DC.) Michelang.
- Miconia bullotricha Bécquer & Majure
- Miconia buntingii Wurdack
- Miconia burchellii Triana
- Miconia burkeae J.C.Angulo & Michelang.
- Miconia buxifolia Naudin

=== C ===
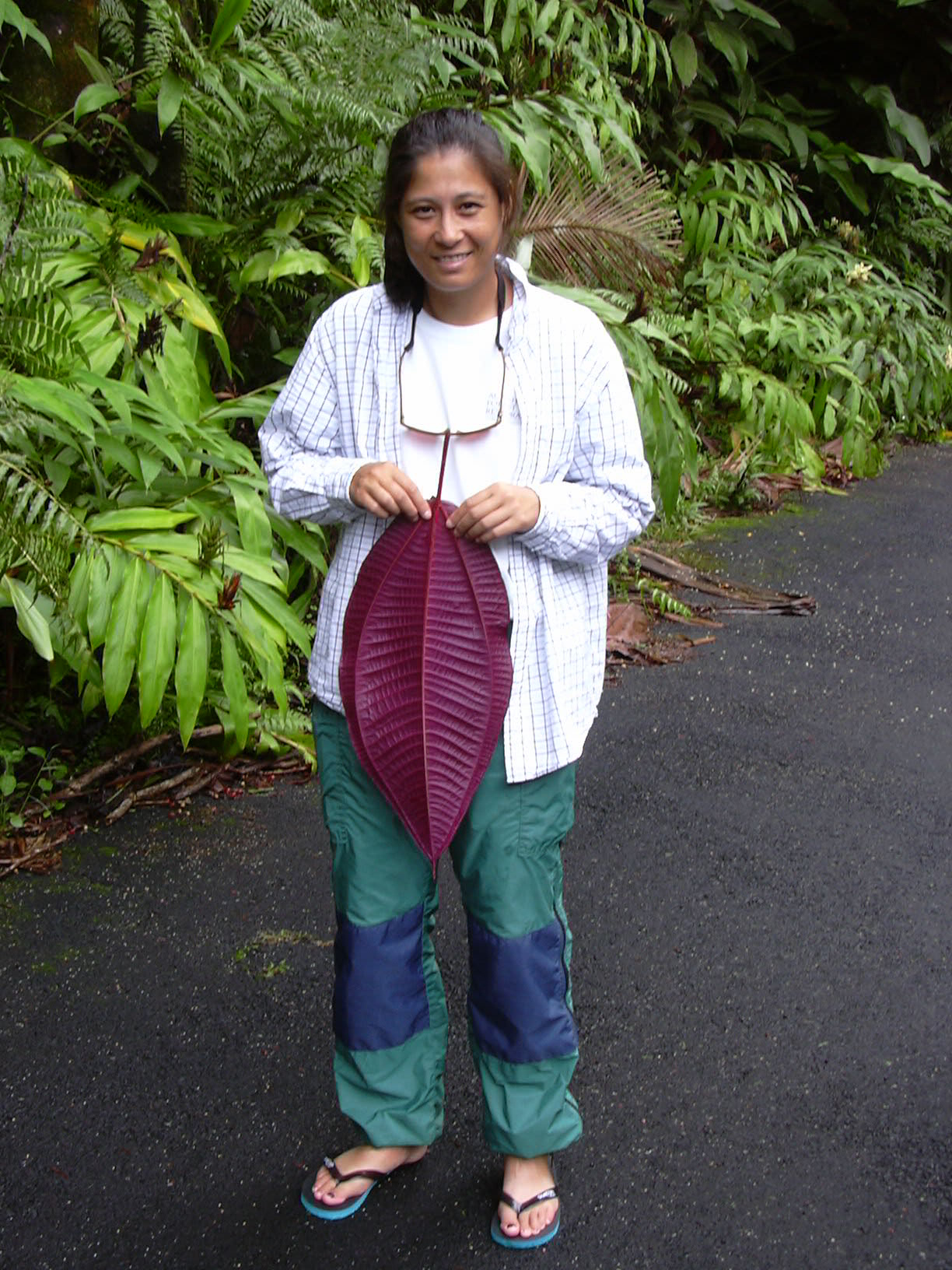
Miconia calvescens leaf

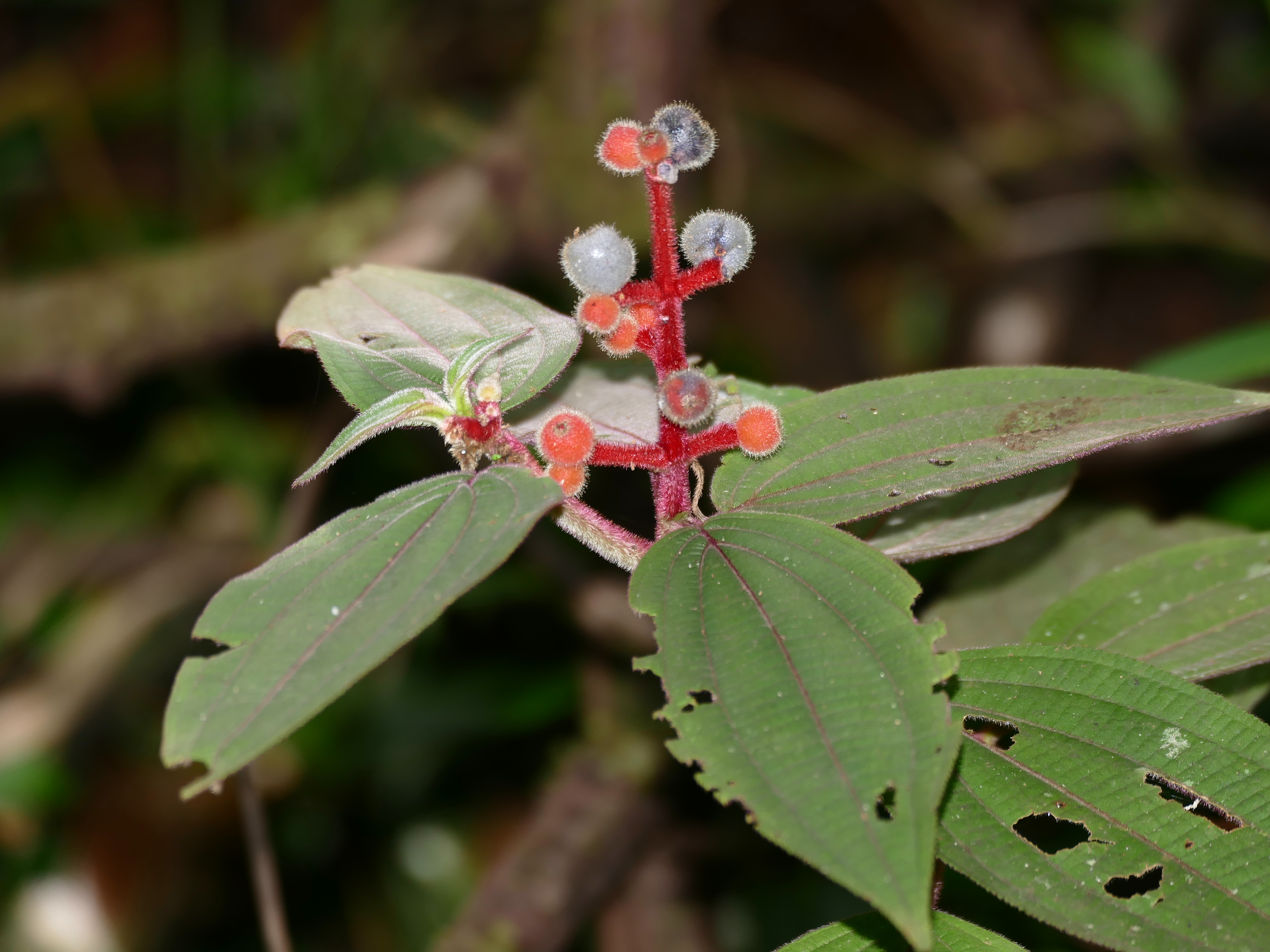
Miconia ceramicarpa

- Miconia cabraliensis (Wurdack) R.Goldenb.
- Miconia cacatin (Aubl.) S.S.Renner
- Miconia cacumina Wurdack
- Miconia caelata (Bonpl.) DC.
- Miconia caelestis (Standl.) Michelang.
- Miconia caesariata Wurdack
- Miconia caesia Cogn. & Gleason
- Miconia caiuia E.C.O.Chagas & R.Goldenb.
- Miconia cajalbanensis Judd, Bécquer & Majure
- Miconia cajanumana Wurdack
- Miconia calignosa Wurdack
- Miconia calocoma Almeda
- Miconia calophylla (D.Don) Triana
- Miconia calvescens DC.
- Miconia calycina Cogn.
- Miconia calycopteris (Rich.) Judd, Bécquer & Majure
- Miconia campanensis Urb. & Ekman
- Miconia campestris (Benth.) Triana
- Miconia campii Wurdack
- Miconia camporum (Brade) R.Goldenb.
- Miconia canaguensis Wurdack
- Miconia canaimana Michelang.
- Miconia cancellata (Cogn.) R.Goldenb.
- Miconia candelabrum (J.F.Macbr.) R.Goldenb. & Michelang.
- Miconia cannabina Markgr.
- Miconia canoi Michelang. & Paredes
- Miconia capillaris (Sw.) M.Gómez
- Miconia capilliflora (Naudin) R.Goldenb.
- Miconia capillinervis Ionta & Judd
- Miconia capillipes (Triana) Michelang.
- Miconia capitellata Cogn.
- Miconia capixaba R.Goldenb.
- Miconia caquetana (Sprague) Michelang.
- Miconia caquetensis (Gleason) Ocampo & Almeda
- Miconia carassana Cogn.
- Miconia cardenasiae Jan.M.Burke & Michelang.
- Miconia carnea Cogn.
- Miconia carolensis (Gleason) Michelang.
- Miconia carpishana Wurdack
- Miconia carvalhoana Baumgratz & D'El Rei Souza
- Miconia caryophyllaea (DC.) Triana
- Miconia castaneifolia Naudin
- Miconia castillensis Wurdack
- Miconia castrensis Wurdack
- Miconia cataractae Triana
- Miconia catharinensis (Cogn.) R.Goldenb.
- Miconia caucana Gleason
- Miconia caudata (Bonpl.) DC.
- Miconia caudatifolia Michelang.
- Miconia caudiculata Pittier
- Miconia caudigera DC.
- Miconia cauingia J.F.Macbr.
- Miconia cautis Wurdack
- Miconia cava Michelang. & R.Goldenb.
- Miconia cazaletii Wurdack
- Miconia celaquensis Almeda
- Miconia centrodesma Naudin
- Miconia centrodesmoides Wurdack
- Miconia centronioides Gleason
- Miconia centrophora Naudin
- Miconia centrosperma Almeda
- Miconia cephaloides Michelang.
- Miconia ceramicarpa (DC.) Cogn.
- Miconia cerasiflora Urb.
- Miconia cercophora Wurdack
- Miconia cernua Naudin
- Miconia cernuiflora Jan.M.Burke & Michelang.
- Miconia chaetocalyx (A.Gray) R.Goldenb.
- Miconia chaetodon Naudin
- Miconia chaetodonta R.Goldenb. & Michelang.
- Miconia chamissois Naudin
- Miconia chapensis E.Cotton & W.Meier
- Miconia charadrophila (Tutin) Michelang.
- Miconia charleswrightii Bécquer & Judd
- Miconia chemillensis L.A.Cárdenas
- Miconia chichirivichensis Michelang.
- Miconia chimantensis (Wurdack) Michelang.
- Miconia chinantlana (Naudin) Almeda
- Miconia chionophila Naudin
- Miconia chiriquiensis Almeda
- Miconia chlorocarpa Cogn.
- Miconia chocoensis (Wurdack) Gamba & Almeda
- Miconia choriophylla Wurdack
- Miconia christophoriana (Ham.) Judd & Majure
- Miconia chrysocoma Gleason
- Miconia chrysoneura Triana
- Miconia chrysophylla (Rich.) Urb.
- Miconia ciliaris Triana
- Miconia ciliata (Rich.) DC.
- Miconia ciliolata (Cogn.) R.Goldenb.
- Miconia cinchonifolia DC.
- Miconia cinerascens Miq.
- Miconia cinerea Cogn.
- Miconia cinereiformis Ionta, Judd & Skean
- Miconia cinnabarina Jan.M.Burke & Michelang.
- Miconia cinnamomea Beurl.
- Miconia cinnamomifolia Naudin
- Miconia cionotricha L.Uribe
- Miconia cipoensis R.Goldenb.
- Miconia cladonia Gleason
- Miconia clandestina (Almeda) Almeda
- Miconia clasei Majure, Skean & Judd
- Miconia clathrantha Triana
- Miconia cleefii L.Uribe
- Miconia clementiana (Britton) Bécquer & Majure
- Miconia clementii (P.Wilson ex Britton) Bécquer
- Miconia clivorum Wurdack
- Miconia clypeata Wurdack
- Miconia coadunata (Wurdack) R.Goldenb.
- Miconia coarctiflora (Wurdack) Ocampo & Almeda
- Miconia coccinea (Rich.) Judd & Skean
- Miconia cocoensis Almeda & Kriebel
- Miconia codonostigma Gleason ex Wurdack
- Miconia coelestis (D.Don) Naudin
- Miconia coerulea (D.Don) Naudin
- Miconia cogniauxii (Glaz. ex D'El Rei Souza) R.Goldenb.
- Miconia collatata Wurdack
- Miconia collayensis Wurdack
- Miconia colliculosa Almeda
- Miconia coloradensis Almeda
- Miconia commutata Almeda
- Miconia comosa Cogn.
- Miconia complanata Jan.M.Burke, Michelang. & D.Fernández
- Miconia compressa Naudin
- Miconia compressicaulis Wurdack
- Miconia comptifolia Wurdack
- Miconia concinna Almeda
- Miconia condylata Wurdack
- Miconia confertiflora Almeda
- Miconia conformis Wurdack
- Miconia conglomerata (DC.) Michelang.
- Miconia conica Skean, Judd & Majure
- Miconia coniophora Urb. & Ekman
- Miconia conoapiculata Michelang.
- Miconia conoattenuata Michelang.
- Miconia conobracteata Michelang.
- Miconia conobrenesii Michelang.
- Miconia conocentronioides Michelang.
- Miconia conochiriquensis Michelang.
- Miconia conocuatrecasasii Michelang.
- Miconia conodentata Michelang.
- Miconia conohirtella Michelang.
- Miconia conolancifolia Michelang.
- Miconia conomacrantha Michelang.
- Miconia conomicrantha Michelang.
- Miconia conoplumosa Michelang.
- Miconia conorubiginosa Michelang.
- Miconia conorufescens Michelang.
- Miconia conosetifera Michelang.
- Miconia conosetosa Michelang.
- Miconia conospeciosa Michelang.
- Miconia contrerasii Wurdack
- Miconia cookii Gleason
- Miconia cooperi (Cogn.) Michelang.
- Miconia corallina Spring
- Miconia corazonica Wurdack
- Miconia corcovadensis (Raddi) R.Goldenb.
- Miconia cordata Triana
- Miconia cordierorum Ionta & Judd
- Miconia cordifolia Wurdack
- Miconia cordigera (Triana) R.Goldenb.
- Miconia cordilamina Judd & Bécquer
- Miconia coriacea (Sw.) DC.
- Miconia cornifera Humberto Mend., Posada-Herrera & H.David
- Miconia cornifolia (Desr.) Naudin
- Miconia cornoides (Schltdl. & Cham.) Almeda
- Miconia cornuta (Lozano & N.Ruiz-R.) Almeda & Alvear
- Miconia coronata (Bonpl.) DC.
- Miconia coronifera Wurdack
- Miconia correae Almeda
- Miconia corymbiformis Cogn.
- Miconia corymbosa (Rich.) Judd & Skean
- Miconia cosangensis Wurdack
- Miconia costaricensis Cogn.
- Miconia costata (Urb.) Judd, Bécquer & Majure
- Miconia costoides (Michelang.) Michelang.
- Miconia cottoniana Michelang.
- Miconia cowanii Wurdack
- Miconia crassifolia Triana
- Miconia crassinervia Cogn.
- Miconia crassinervis (Urb.) Skean, Judd & Majure
- Miconia crassipes Triana
- Miconia crassistigma Cogn.
- Miconia crebribullata Wurdack
- Miconia cremadena Gleason
- Miconia cremersii (Wurdack) Ocampo & Almeda
- Miconia cremophylla Naudin
- Miconia crenata (Vahl) Michelang.
- Miconia crenulata (Gleason) Michelang.
- Miconia cretacea Gleason
- Miconia crinita Naudin
- Miconia cristalensis (Borhidi) Judd, Bécquer & Majure
- Miconia cristata (Reginato & R.Goldenb.) R.Goldenb.
- Miconia croatii (Almeda) Michelang. & Almeda
- Miconia crocata Almeda
- Miconia crocea (Desr.) Naudin
- Miconia crocina Michelang.
- Miconia crossosepala (Griseb.) Ionta & Judd
- Miconia crotonifolia (Desr.) Judd & Ionta
- Miconia cruenta Triana
- Miconia cuatrecasasii Markgr. ex Cuatrec.
- Miconia cubacinerea Majure & Judd
- Miconia cubana (Alain) Majure & Judd
- Miconia cubapinetorum Bécquer & Majure
- Miconia cubatanensis Hoehne
- Miconia cubensis (Griseb.) C.Wright
- Miconia cucullata (Gleason) Michelang.
- Miconia cundinamarcensis Wurdack
- Miconia cuneata Triana
- Miconia cuneatissima R.Goldenb. & Michelang.
- Miconia cupeyalensis Bécquer & Michelang.
- Miconia cuprea Wurdack
- Miconia cursoris (Wurdack) Michelang.
- Miconia curta (Gleason) Wurdack
- Miconia curvipila (Urb. & Ekman) Ionta, Judd & Skean
- Miconia curvitheca Posada-Herrera & Humberto Mend.
- Miconia cuspidata Naudin
- Miconia cuspidatissima Pittier
- Miconia cutucuensis Wurdack
- Miconia cyanocarpa Naudin
- Miconia cyathanthera Triana
- Miconia cymifera (Donn.Sm.) Michelang.

=== D ===
- Miconia daironii Michelang.
- Miconia danielii Almeda
- Miconia dapsiliflora Wurdack
- Miconia dasyclada Wurdack
- Miconia dasytricha (A.Gray) R.Goldenb.
- Miconia davidsei (Almeda) Almeda
- Miconia debilis (Crueg.) Michelang.
- Miconia decipiens Cogn.
- Miconia decorticans (Bécquer) Bécquer & Majure
- Miconia decurrens Cogn.
- Miconia deflexa (Triana) R.Goldenb.
- Miconia delicatula A.Rich.
- Miconia demissifolia Wurdack
- Miconia dendroides (Naudin) R.Goldenb.
- Miconia densifolia Cogn.
- Miconia dentata (D.Don) Michelang.
- Miconia denticulata Naudin
- Miconia depauperata Gardner
- Miconia dependens (Pav. ex D.Don) Judd & Majure
- Miconia desiliens (Gleason) Michelang.
- Miconia desmantha Benth.
- Miconia desportesii Urb.
- Miconia diaphanea Gleason
- Miconia dichroa Cogn.
- Miconia dichrophylla J.F.Macbr.
- Miconia diegogomezii Kriebel & Almeda
- Miconia dielsiana Urb.
- Miconia dielsii Markgr.
- Miconia difficilis Triana
- Miconia diffusa (Cogn.) R.Goldenb.
- Miconia diguensis (Wurdack) Michelang.
- Miconia dimorphica (J.F.Macbr.) Michelang.
- Miconia dimorphotheca Jan.M.Burke & Michelang.
- Miconia dioica Wurdack
- Miconia dipsacea Naudin
- Miconia discoidea (Lozano & N.Ruiz-R.) Almeda & Alvear
- Miconia discolor DC.
- Miconia discolorata Bécquer & Michelang.
- Miconia dispar Benth.
- Miconia dissimulans Wurdack
- Miconia dissita Almeda
- Miconia dissitiflora Almeda
- Miconia dissitinervia Kriebel, Almeda & A.Estrada
- Miconia disticha Michelang.
- Miconia divaricatiflora Judd & Bécquer
- Miconia divergens Triana
- Miconia divisoriana Wurdack
- Miconia dodecandra Cogn.
- Miconia dodsonii Wurdack
- Miconia dolichantha (Naudin) R.Goldenb.
- Miconia dolichodons (Cogn.) R.Goldenb.
- Miconia dolichopoda Naudin
- Miconia dolichorrhyncha Naudin
- Miconia dolichostachya (Naudin) R.Goldenb.
- Miconia domatiata (Urb. & Ekman) Skean & Judd
- Miconia domingensis Cogn.
- Miconia dominicensis (Penneys & Judd) Penneys
- Miconia domociliata Michelang.
- Miconia donaeana Naudin
- Miconia doriana Cogn.
- Miconia dorsaliporosa R.Goldenb. & Reginato
- Miconia dorsiloba Gleason
- Miconia drosera (Sagot) Michelang.
- Miconia dubia (DC.) R.Goldenb.
- Miconia duckei Cogn.
- Miconia dudleyi Wurdack
- Miconia duidae (Gleason) Michelang.
- Miconia dulcis Jan.M.Burke, Michelang. & K.Grant
- Miconia dumetosa Cogn.
- Miconia dunstervillei Wurdack
- Miconia dura Triana
- Miconia durandii Michelang. & P.Jørg.
- Miconia dusenii (Cogn.) R.Goldenb.

=== E ===
- Miconia ebracteata (Triana) R.Goldenb.
- Miconia echinata (Griseb.) Judd, Bécquer & Majure
- Miconia echinocarpa Judd, Bécquer & Majure
- Miconia ecostata (W.T.Aiton) Sweet ex Triana
- Miconia ecuadorensis (Gleason) Michelang.
- Miconia edentula (Gleason) Michelang. & R.Goldenb.
- Miconia egensis Cogn.
- Miconia egregia Wurdack
- Miconia ekmanii (Urb.) Judd, Bécquer & Majure
- Miconia elaeagnoides (Sw.) Griseb.
- Miconia elaeodendrum (DC.) Naudin
- Miconia elaeoides Naudin
- Miconia elata (Sw.) DC.
- Miconia elegans Cogn.
- Miconia elegantissima Bécquer & Judd
- Miconia ellipsoidea (Urb. & Ekman) Ionta, Judd & Skean
- Miconia ellsworthii Michelang.
- Miconia elongata Cogn.
- Miconia elvirae Wurdack
- Miconia emendata Wurdack
- Miconia epibaterium (DC.) Michelang.
- Miconia eremita L.Uribe
- Miconia erikasplundii Gamba & Almeda
- Miconia erikmaniana Skean & Judd
- Miconia eriocalyx Cogn.
- Miconia erioclada Triana
- Miconia eriodonta DC.
- Miconia erioneura Cogn.
- Miconia ernstii Wurdack
- Miconia ernstulei Michelang.
- Miconia erosa Gleason
- Miconia erostrata (DC.) R.Goldenb.
- Miconia erythrantha Naudin
- Miconia erythrophylla Ule
- Miconia erythropogon (DC.) Judd & Ionta
- Miconia espinosae Markgr.
- Miconia eugenioides Triana
- Miconia euphorbioides (Naudin) R.Goldenb.
- Miconia evanescens (Almeda) Gamba & Almeda
- Miconia expansa Gleason
- Miconia explicita Wurdack
- Miconia extinctoria (Humb. & Bonpl.) Michelang.

=== F ===
- Miconia fabianiana Mabb.
- Miconia fadyenii (Hook.) Judd & Skean
- Miconia falcata Cogn.
- Miconia fallacissima (Markgr.) R.Goldenb.
- Miconia fallax DC.
- Miconia fanshawei Wurdack
- Miconia farfanii Jan.M.Burke & Michelang.
- Miconia farinasii (Wurdack) Michelang.
- Miconia fasciculata Gardner
- Miconia fastigiata (Cogn.) R.Goldenb.
- Miconia fausta (Wurdack) Michelang.
- Miconia favosa (Desr.) Naudin
- Miconia fenestrata (Benth.) Michelang.
- Miconia ferreyrae Wurdack
- Miconia ferruginata DC.
- Miconia ferruginea (Desr.) DC.
- Miconia fictilis (J.F.Macbr.) Michelang. & R.Goldenb.
- Miconia filamentosa Gleason
- Miconia filiformis (Gleason) Michelang.
- Miconia filisepala (Urb.) Judd, Bécquer & Majure
- Miconia firma J.F.Macbr.
- Miconia fissa Gleason
- Miconia fissinervia (Gleason) Michelang.
- Miconia flaccida Gleason
- Miconia flammea Casar.
- Miconia flavescens Cogn.
- Miconia flavida Cogn. ex Standl.
- Miconia flexuosa (Triana) Michelang.
- Miconia floccosa Cogn.
- Miconia florbella C.E.Schnell ex Michelang. & R.Goldenb.
- Miconia floribunda (Bonpl.) DC.
- Miconia folsomii (Almeda) Almeda
- Miconia fontanae (Reginato & R.Goldenb.) R.Goldenb.
- Miconia foreroi (Wurdack) Michelang.
- Miconia formicaria Gamba & Almeda
- Miconia formicocollina Michelang.
- Miconia formicofoliosa Michelang.
- Miconia formicoheterophylla Michelang.
- Miconia formicojuruensis Michelang.
- Miconia formicosetosa Michelang.
- Miconia formonensis (Judd, Skean & Clase) Judd, Bécquer & Majure
- Miconia formosa Cogn.
- Miconia forzzae R.Goldenb. & Hinoshita
- Miconia fosbergii Wurdack
- Miconia fosteri Wurdack
- Miconia foveolata Cogn.
- Miconia fragilis Naudin
- Miconia fragrans Cogn.
- Miconia fragrantissima (Almeda) Michelang. & Almeda
- Miconia francavillana Cogn.
- Miconia fraterna (Gleason) Michelang.
- Miconia freyreissii (Cogn.) R.Goldenb.
- Miconia friedmaniorum Almeda & Umaña
- Miconia friedrichlehmanni R.Goldenb.
- Miconia frontinoana Cogn. & Gleason
- Miconia fruticulosa Cogn.
- Miconia fuertesii Cogn.
- Miconia fuliginosa Wurdack
- Miconia fulvostellata L.O.Williams
- Miconia funckii Wurdack
- Miconia furfuracea (Vahl) Griseb.

=== G ===
- Miconia galactantha Naudin
- Miconia galdamesiae Kriebel & Almeda
- Miconia galeiformis Jan.M.Burke & Michelang.
- Miconia galeottii (Naudin) Michelang.
- Miconia garcia-barrigae (Wurdack) Almeda
- Miconia garciabeltranii Bécquer & Majure
- Miconia gentryi Wurdack
- Miconia georgebuntingii Michelang.
- Miconia gibba Markgr.
- Miconia gigantophylla (Britton) Michelang.
- Miconia glaberrima (Schltdl.) Naudin
- Miconia glabrata Cogn.
- Miconia glabrifolia Skean, Judd, Majure & Bécquer
- Miconia glandulifera Cogn.
- Miconia glanduliflora R.Goldenb. & Michelang.
- Miconia glandulipetala Ocampo & Almeda
- Miconia glandulistyla Wurdack
- Miconia glandulosa (Sw.) Naudin
- Miconia glaucescens Triana
- Miconia glazioviana Cogn.
- Miconia gleasoniana Wurdack
- Miconia globulifera Naudin
- Miconia globuliflora (Rich.) Cham. ex Triana
- Miconia glomerata Triana
- Miconia glomerulifera Cogn.
- Miconia glomeruliflora Judd, Bécquer & Majure
- Miconia gloriosa (Macfad.) Michelang.
- Miconia glutinosa Cogn.
- Miconia glyptophylla Wurdack
- Miconia goldenbergiana Caddah
- Miconia gonioclada Triana
- Miconia goniostigma Triana
- Miconia gonoptera (Gleason) Michelang.
- Miconia gorzulae (Wurdack) Michelang. & R.Goldenb.
- Miconia gossypina Triana
- Miconia goudotii Naudin
- Miconia graciliflora (Huber) Michelang.
- Miconia gracilifolia Ionta & Judd
- Miconia gracilipes (Gleason) Michelang.
- Miconia gracilis Triana
- Miconia granatensis (Gleason) Ocampo & Almeda
- Miconia grandibracteata Judd, Bécquer & Majure
- Miconia grandidentata Almeda
- Miconia grandiflora Cogn.
- Miconia grandifoliata R.Goldenb. & Michelang.
- Miconia granulata (Urb.) Majure & Judd
- Miconia granulosa Naudin
- Miconia granvillei (Wurdack) Michelang.
- Miconia gratissima Benth. ex Triana
- Miconia grayana Cogn.
- Miconia grayumii Almeda
- Miconia grenadensis (Penneys & Judd) Penneys
- Miconia griffisii J.F.Macbr.
- Miconia grisea Cogn.
- Miconia grisebachiana Bécquer & Michelang.
- Miconia grossidentata Wurdack
- Miconia guadalupensis (DC.) Judd, Ionta & Majure
- Miconia guaiquinimae Wurdack
- Miconia guajaibonensis Judd, Bécquer & Majure
- Miconia guatemalensis Cogn. ex Donn.Sm.
- Miconia guayaquilensis (Bonpl.) D.Don
- Miconia gynoverrucosa (Reginato) R.Goldenb.

=== H ===
- Miconia hadrophylla Wurdack
- Miconia haemantha (Triana ex Cogn.) Skean, Judd & Majure
- Miconia haemanthoides Skean, Judd & Majure
- Miconia hamata Cogn.
- Miconia hammelii (Almeda) Almeda
- Miconia hanstuerckheimii Michelang.
- Miconia harlingii Wurdack
- Miconia hatschbachii (Brade) R.Goldenb.
- Miconia haughtii (Gleason) Wurdack
- Miconia heliotropoides Triana
- Miconia hematostemon Naudin
- Miconia hemenostigma Naudin
- Miconia henripittieri (Kriebel) Michelang.
- Miconia heptamera (Wurdack) Michelang.
- Miconia herincquiana (Cogn.) R.Goldenb.
- Miconia hermogenesii (Baumgratz & D'El Rei Souza) R.Goldenb.
- Miconia hernandogarciae Humberto Mend. & Idarraga
- Miconia herpetica DC.
- Miconia herrerae Gleason
- Miconia herzogii Cogn.
- Miconia heterochaeta Wurdack
- Miconia heteroclita (Naudin) Michelang.
- Miconia heteromera Naudin
- Miconia heteronervis (Naudin) Michelang.
- Miconia heteroneura (Schrank & Mart. ex DC.) Michelang.
- Miconia heterophylla (Naudin) M.Gómez
- Miconia heteroporata (Reginato) R.Goldenb.
- Miconia heterothrix Gleason & Wurdack
- Miconia heterotricha Wurdack
- Miconia hexamera Wurdack
- Miconia hexapetala Wurdack
- Miconia hildeana Kriebel & Almeda
- Miconia hirsuta (Sw.) Judd, Bécquer & Majure
- Miconia hirsutivena Gleason
- Miconia hirta Cogn.
- Miconia hirtella Cogn.
- Miconia hirtellicaulis Ionta & Judd
- Miconia hirticalyx Judd & Bécquer
- Miconia hirticaulis Skean, Judd & Majure
- Miconia hirtistyla Majure & Judd
- Miconia hispaniolica Judd & Majure
- Miconia hispidula (Cogn.) Judd, Bécquer & Majure
- Miconia histothrix Wurdack
- Miconia holosericea (L.) DC.
- Miconia hondurensis Donn.Sm.
- Miconia hookeriana Triana
- Miconia horrida (Cogn.) R.Goldenb.
- Miconia hospitalis Wurdack
- Miconia hotteana (Urb. & Ekman) Judd & Ionta
- Miconia hottensis Ionta, Judd & Skean
- Miconia howardiana Judd, Salzman & Skean
- Miconia huanucensis Wurdack
- Miconia huberi Wurdack
- Miconia huigrensis Wurdack
- Miconia humifusa Jan.M.Burke & Michelang.
- Miconia hutchisonii Wurdack
- Miconia hybophylla (Urb.) Majure & Judd
- Miconia hyemalis A.St.-Hil. & Naudin ex Naudin
- Miconia hygrophila Naudin
- Miconia hylophila Wurdack
- Miconia hymenanthera Triana
- Miconia hymenonervia (Raddi) Cogn.
- Miconia hyperprasina Naudin
- Miconia hypiodes Urb. & Ekman
- Miconia hypoglauca (C.Wright ex Griseb.) Judd, Bécquer & Majure
- Miconia hypoleuca (Benth.) Triana

=== I ===
- Miconia ibaguensis (Bonpl.) Triana
- Miconia ibarrae Almeda
- Miconia icosandra Gleason
- Miconia idiogena Wurdack
- Miconia idroboi Wurdack
- Miconia igniaria Bonpl. ex Naudin
- Miconia iluensis Wurdack
- Miconia imbricata Gleason
- Miconia imitans Wurdack
- Miconia imparilis (Wurdack) Michelang.
- Miconia impetiolaris (Sw.) D.Don
- Miconia impressa (Urb.) Judd, Bécquer & Majure
- Miconia impressinervis Skean & Judd
- Miconia inaequalifolia Triana
- Miconia inaequalis R.Goldenb. & Michelang.
- Miconia inaequidens (DC.) Naudin
- Miconia inaequipetiolata Majure & Judd
- Miconia inamoena Pilg.
- Miconia inanis Cogn. & Gleason
- Miconia incachacana Wurdack
- Miconia incerta (Wurdack) Gamba & Almeda
- Miconia inconspicua Miq.
- Miconia incurva Gleason
- Miconia indicoviolacea Gamba, Almeda & Alvear
- Miconia ingens Wurdack
- Miconia innata Gleason
- Miconia inobsepta (Wurdack) Michelang.
- Miconia inopinata (Almeda) Almeda
- Miconia insueta Wurdack
- Miconia insularis Gleason
- Miconia intermedia (DC.) Ocampo & Almeda
- Miconia intonsa (E.Cotton & W.Meier) Michelang.
- Miconia intricata Triana
- Miconia inusitata (Wurdack) Michelang. & R.Goldenb.
- Miconia ioneura Griseb.
- Miconia ionopogon (Mart.) R.Goldenb.
- Miconia irwinii Wurdack
- Miconia itatiaiae (Wawra) R.Goldenb.
- Miconia iteophylla Almeda

=== J ===
- Miconia jahnii Pittier
- Miconia jaliscana (Standl.) Michelang.
- Miconia jamesluteynii Michelang.
- Miconia japurensis Cogn.
- Miconia jashaferi Majure & Judd
- Miconia javorkaeana Borhidi
- Miconia jefensis Almeda
- Miconia jentaculorum Wurdack
- Miconia jimenezii Judd & R.S.Beaman
- Miconia jitotolana Wurdack
- Miconia johnwurdackiana Baumgratz & D'El Rei Souza
- Miconia jorgensenii Wurdack
- Miconia josecuatrecasasii R.Goldenb. & Michelang.
- Miconia joseluisii Bécquer & Majure
- Miconia jucunda (DC.) Triana
- Miconia juddii (Skean) Skean, Judd & Majure
- Miconia julianii Michelang.
- Miconia juliansteyermarkii R.Goldenb. & Michelang.
- Miconia juruensis Pilg.

=== K ===
- Miconia kappellei Almeda & Kriebel
- Miconia kappleri Naudin
- Miconia karlkrugii Majure & Judd
- Miconia karsticola Judd, Bécquer, Skean & Majure
- Miconia kavanayensis Wurdack
- Miconia kellyana Almeda & R.B.Pacifico
- Miconia klotzschii Triana
- Miconia klugii Gleason
- Miconia koepckeana Wurdack
- Miconia kollmannii R.Goldenb. & Reginato
- Miconia kranzlinii Cogn.
- Miconia kriegeriana Baumgratz & Chiaveg.
- Miconia krugiana (Cogn.) Majure & Judd
- Miconia krugii Cogn.
- Miconia kuntzei Cogn. ex Kuntze

=== L ===
- Miconia labiakiana R.Goldenb. & C.V.Martin
- Miconia lacera (Bonpl.) Naudin
- Miconia lachnoclada Wurdack
- Miconia laciniata Wurdack
- Miconia lacunosa (Cogn.) R.Goldenb.
- Miconia laeta Cogn.
- Miconia laetevirens L.Uribe
- Miconia laevifolia (Gleason) Michelang.
- Miconia laevigata (L.) DC.
- Miconia laevipilis Wurdack
- Miconia lagunensis Ule
- Miconia lambayequensis Wurdack
- Miconia lamprarrhena Triana
- Miconia lamprophylla Triana
- Miconia lanata (DC.) Triana
- Miconia lanatifolia Judd, Bécquer & Majure
- Miconia lanceifolia (Urb.) Ionta, Judd & Skean
- Miconia lanceolata (Desr.) DC.
- Miconia lancifolia (Spruce ex Triana) Michelang.
- Miconia langsdorffii Cogn.
- Miconia lanuginosa Ruiz & Pav.
- Miconia lapae (D'El Rei Souza & Baumgratz) R.Goldenb.
- Miconia lappacea (DC.) Triana
- Miconia larensis Gleason
- Miconia lasiocalyx Cogn.
- Miconia lasiopetala (Cogn.) Almeda
- Miconia lasiopoda (Benth.) Michelang.
- Miconia lasiostachya (Cogn.) R.Goldenb.
- Miconia lasiostyla Gleason
- Miconia lasseri Gleason
- Miconia latecrenata Naudin
- Miconia lateriflora Cogn.
- Miconia latidecurrens Gamba & Almeda
- Miconia latifolia (D.Don) Naudin
- Miconia latistigma Cogn.
- Miconia laurina (D.Don) Naudin
- Miconia laxa Wurdack
- Miconia laxiflora (Schltdl.) Michelang.
- Miconia laxivenula (Wurdack) Gamba & Almeda
- Miconia leabiscoriacea R.Goldenb.
- Miconia leabiswarmingiana R.Goldenb.
- Miconia leablanchetiana R.Goldenb.
- Miconia leacalvescens R.Goldenb.
- Miconia leacapitata R.Goldenb.
- Miconia leacinnamomifolia R.Goldenb.
- Miconia leacollina R.Goldenb.
- Miconia leaconfusa R.Goldenb.
- Miconia leacongestiflora R.Goldenb.
- Miconia leacordifolia R.Goldenb.
- Miconia leacoriacea R.Goldenb.
- Miconia leacrenata R.Goldenb. & Michelang.
- Miconia leacuminata R.Goldenb.
- Miconia leacuneata R.Goldenb.
- Miconia leadebilis R.Goldenb.
- Miconia leadentata R.Goldenb.
- Miconia leadispar R.Goldenb.
- Miconia leaechinata R.Goldenb.
- Miconia leaeichleri R.Goldenb.
- Miconia leaeriocalyx R.Goldenb.
- Miconia leafallax R.Goldenb.
- Miconia leaflavescens R.Goldenb.
- Miconia leafloribunda R.Goldenb.
- Miconia leafluminensis R.Goldenb.
- Miconia leafoveolata R.Goldenb.
- Miconia leafragilis R.Goldenb.
- Miconia leagracilis R.Goldenb.
- Miconia leagrayana R.Goldenb.
- Miconia leahirtella R.Goldenb.
- Miconia leahumilis R.Goldenb.
- Miconia leakleinii R.Goldenb.
- Miconia lealancifolia R.Goldenb.
- Miconia lealindeniana Michelang. & R.Goldenb.
- Miconia lealpestris R.Goldenb.
- Miconia leamarginata R.Goldenb.
- Miconia leamarkgrafii R.Goldenb.
- Miconia leamollis R.Goldenb.
- Miconia leamourae R.Goldenb.
- Miconia leandroides Cogn. & Gleason
- Miconia leaneurotricha R.Goldenb.
- Miconia leaoblongifolia R.Goldenb.
- Miconia leaorganensis R.Goldenb.
- Miconia leaovata R.Goldenb.
- Miconia leapallida R.Goldenb.
- Miconia leapennipilis R.Goldenb.
- Miconia leapolychaeta R.Goldenb.
- Miconia learamboi R.Goldenb.
- Miconia learigida R.Goldenb.
- Miconia leasanguinea R.Goldenb.
- Miconia leasylvatica R.Goldenb.
- Miconia leatetragona R.Goldenb.
- Miconia leatetraptera R.Goldenb.
- Miconia leatomentosa R.Goldenb.
- Miconia leatrata R.Goldenb.
- Miconia leatristis R.Goldenb.
- Miconia leatruncata R.Goldenb.
- Miconia leaumbellata R.Goldenb.
- Miconia leawarmingiana R.Goldenb.
- Miconia leblondii Judd & Skean
- Miconia lechleri Triana
- Miconia ledifolia (DC.) Naudin
- Miconia lehmannii Cogn.
- Miconia leiotricha Wurdack
- Miconia lennartanderssonii Michelang. & R.Goldenb.
- Miconia lenticellata Alain
- Miconia lepidota DC.
- Miconia leptantha Urb. & Ekman
- Miconia leptopus Michelang. & R.Goldenb.
- Miconia leticiana (Michelang.) Michelang.
- Miconia leucandra (C.Wright ex Griseb.) Judd & Ionta
- Miconia leucocarpa DC.
- Miconia licrophora Wurdack
- Miconia liebmannii Cogn.
- Miconia liesneri Wurdack
- Miconia ligulata Almeda
- Miconia ligustrina (Sm.) Triana
- Miconia ligustroides (DC.) Naudin
- Miconia lilacina Triana
- Miconia lima (Desr.) M.Gómez
- Miconia limbata (Cogn.) R.Goldenb.
- Miconia limitaris Wurdack
- Miconia limoides (Urb.) Majure & Judd
- Miconia lindeniana (Naudin) M.Gómez
- Miconia lindmanii (Urb.) Bécquer
- Miconia linearis (Gleason) Michelang.
- Miconia linneoides (Hook.f.) Michelang.
- Miconia liogieri Bécquer & Michelang.
- Miconia lithophila L.Uribe
- Miconia littlei Wurdack
- Miconia livida Triana
- Miconia loligomorpha (R.Goldenb. & Reginato) R.Goldenb.
- Miconia lomensis (Urb.) Michelang.
- Miconia lonchophylla Naudin
- Miconia longibarbis (DC.) R.Goldenb.
- Miconia longibracteata Almeda
- Miconia longicollis (Urb. & Cogn.) Judd & Bécquer
- Miconia longicoma (Cogn.) Ocampo & Almeda
- Miconia longicuspidata S.S.Renner & R.Goldenb.
- Miconia longicuspis Cogn.
- Miconia longidentata Michelang. & W.Meier
- Miconia longifolia (Aubl.) DC.
- Miconia longipetiolata (Brade) R.Goldenb.
- Miconia longiracemosa Gleason
- Miconia longisepala Gleason
- Miconia longisetosa Wurdack
- Miconia longispicata Triana
- Miconia lorenaensis J.S.Murillo, Londoño-Ech. & H.David
- Miconia lorenzouribei Michelang.
- Miconia loretensis Pilg.
- Miconia loreyoides Triana
- Miconia lourteigiana Wurdack
- Miconia loxensis (Bonpl.) DC.
- Miconia lucenae R.Goldenb. & Michelang.
- Miconia luciana Gleason
- Miconia lucianobernardii Michelang.
- Miconia lucida Naudin
- Miconia luctatoris (Wurdack) R.Goldenb.
- Miconia lugonis Wurdack
- Miconia lugubris Cogn.
- Miconia lundelliana L.O.Williams
- Miconia lundellii (Wurdack) Almeda
- Miconia lurida Cogn.
- Miconia lutea (Cogn.) R.Goldenb.
- Miconia luteola Cogn.
- Miconia lutescens DC.
- Miconia luteynii Wurdack
- Miconia lutgardae Bécquer & Michelang.
- Miconia lymanii Wurdack

=== M ===
- Miconia macayana Judd & Skean
- Miconia macbrydeana Wurdack
- Miconia machinazana C.Ulloa & D.A.Neill
- Miconia macrantha Triana
- Miconia macrocarpa (Urb. & Ekman) Judd & Ionta
- Miconia macrodon (Naudin) Wurdack
- Miconia macropetala (R.O.Williams) Michelang.
- Miconia macrophysca (Spruce ex Triana) Michelang.
- Miconia macropora (Triana) R.Goldenb.
- Miconia macroptera (Naudin) Michelang.
- Miconia macrosperma (Mart.) Michelang.
- Miconia macrothyrsa Benth.
- Miconia macrotis Cogn.
- Miconia maculata (Urb. & Ekman) Judd, Bécquer & Majure
- Miconia macuxi Meirelles, Caddah & R.Goldenb.
- Miconia madisonii Wurdack
- Miconia madrensis Standl.
- Miconia maestrensis Judd, Bécquer & Majure
- Miconia magdalenae Triana
- Miconia magdalenensis (Brade) R.Goldenb.
- Miconia magnifolia Gamba & Almeda
- Miconia magnipetala (R.Goldenb. & E.A.Camargo) R.Goldenb.
- Miconia maguirei Gleason
- Miconia mahechae Humberto Mend.
- Miconia mailyniae Humberto Mend. & Aguirre-Santoro
- Miconia majalis Cogn.
- Miconia malatestae J.F.Macbr.
- Miconia manarae (Wurdack) Michelang.
- Miconia manauara R.Goldenb., Caddah & Michelang.
- Miconia mandonii Cogn. ex Britton
- Miconia manicata Cogn. & Gleason
- Miconia manserichensis (Wurdack) Michelang.
- Miconia mansfeldiana Urb. & Ekman
- Miconia mantuensis (Britton & P.Wilson) Bécquer
- Miconia mapirensis Gleason
- Miconia marahuacensis (Wurdack) Michelang.
- Miconia marginata Triana
- Miconia mariae Wurdack
- Miconia marigotiana (Urb. & Ekman) Majure & Judd
- Miconia maroana Wurdack
- Miconia martiniana Gleason
- Miconia martinicensis Cogn.
- Miconia matosiana Bécquer & Michelang.
- Miconia matthaei Naudin
- Miconia mattogrossensis Hoehne
- Miconia mattosii (Baumgratz & D'El Rei Souza) R.Goldenb.
- Miconia matudae (L.O.Williams) Michelang.
- Miconia mavacana (Wurdack) Michelang.
- Miconia maximilianea DC.
- Miconia mayarensis (Urb.) Bécquer & Michelang.
- Miconia mayeta (D.Don) Michelang.
- Miconia mazanana J.F.Macbr.
- Miconia mazatecana de Santiago
- Miconia mcphersonii Almeda & Penneys
- Miconia mcvaughii Wurdack
- Miconia media (D.Don) Naudin
- Miconia mediocris Wurdack
- Miconia medusa Gleason
- Miconia megalantha Gleason
- Miconia melanodesma (Naudin) Michelang. & R.Goldenb.
- Miconia melanotricha (Triana) Gleason
- Miconia melastomoides (Raddi) R.Goldenb.
- Miconia melinonis Naudin
- Miconia mellina DC.
- Miconia membranacea Triana
- Miconia mendoncaei Cogn.
- Miconia meridensis Triana
- Miconia meridionalis (D'El Rei Souza) R.Goldenb.
- Miconia mesmeana Gleason
- Miconia mesoamericana Michelang.
- Miconia metallica (Naudin) Triana
- Miconia mexicana (Bonpl.) Naudin
- Miconia micayana Wurdack
- Miconia michelangeliana R.Goldenb. & L.Kollmann
- Miconia miconiastrum (Naudin) R.Goldenb.
- Miconia micrantha Cogn.
- Miconia microdictya (Urb. & Ekman) Skean, Judd & Majure
- Miconia microflora R.Goldenb. & Michelang.
- Miconia micropetala Cogn.
- Miconia microphylla (C.Wright) M.Gómez
- Miconia microphysca Michelang.
- Miconia microstachya (Naudin) R.Goldenb.
- Miconia microthyrsa (R.O.Williams) Michelang.
- Miconia miguelfuertesii Ionta & Judd
- Miconia miles-morgani J.F.Macbr.
- Miconia militis Wurdack
- Miconia mimica Gleason
- Miconia minuta Gleason
- Miconia minutiflora (Bonpl.) DC.
- Miconia miocarpa Naudin
- Miconia mirabilis (Aubl.) L.O.Williams
- Miconia mituana Wurdack
- Miconia moana (Borhidi & O.Muñiz) Bécquer & Michelang.
- Miconia mocquerysii Wurdack
- Miconia modica J.F.Macbr.
- Miconia moensis (Britton) Alain
- Miconia molesta Cogn.
- Miconia molinopampana Wurdack
- Miconia mollicula Triana
- Miconia mollis Triana
- Miconia molybdea Naudin
- Miconia monantha (L.O.Williams) Michelang.
- Miconia monciona Urb. & Ekman
- Miconia monocephala Urb.
- Miconia monopleura (Urb.) Bécquer & Majure
- Miconia monteleagreana (Cogn.) Michelang.
- Miconia monzoniensis Cogn.
- Miconia moorei Wurdack
- Miconia morichensis (Wurdack) Michelang.
- Miconia morii Almeda
- Miconia mornicola A.C.Nicolson
- Miconia mortoniana (Standl.) Michelang.
- Miconia mulleola Wurdack
- Miconia multiflora Cogn. ex Britton
- Miconia multiglandulosa Cogn.
- Miconia multinervia Cogn.
- Miconia multiplinervia Cogn.
- Miconia multisetosa (Cogn.) R.Goldenb.
- Miconia multispicata Naudin
- Miconia munchicana (Lozano & N.Ruiz-R.) Almeda & Alvear
- Miconia munizii (Borhidi) Ionta & Bécquer
- Miconia muricata (D.Don) Triana
- Miconia muriculata (Almeda) Michelang. & Almeda
- Miconia mutabilis (DC.) Triana
- Miconia mutisiana Markgr. ex Cuatrec.
- Miconia myriantha Benth.
- Miconia myrmecina (Gleason) Michelang.
- Miconia myrmecodomatia Michelang.
- Miconia myrtillifolia Naudin

=== N ===
- Miconia namandensis Wurdack
- Miconia nambyquarae Hoehne
- Miconia nanayensis (Wurdack) R.Goldenb. & Michelang.
- Miconia nanopetala R.Goldenb. & Michelang.
- Miconia nanophylla Judd, Bécquer & Majure
- Miconia napoana Wurdack
- Miconia nasella Wurdack
- Miconia navasensis (Britton & P.Wilson) Ionta & Bécquer
- Miconia navicularis (Brade) R.Goldenb.
- Miconia navifolia Ionta, Judd & Skean
- Miconia navioensis Wurdack
- Miconia neblinae (Wurdack) Michelang.
- Miconia neblinensis Wurdack
- Miconia nebulensis Michelang.
- Miconia neei Jan.M.Burke & Michelang.
- Miconia neglecta (Brade) R.Goldenb.
- Miconia neibensis (Skean) Skean, Judd & Majure
- Miconia nematophora Urb. & Ekman
- Miconia neoamygdalina Skean, Judd & Majure
- Miconia neocalcarata Michelang.
- Miconia neocoloradensis Almeda
- Miconia neocordata Michelang.
- Miconia neocoronata Gamba & Almeda
- Miconia neocrotonifolia Michelang.
- Miconia neocrugeriana Michelang.
- Miconia neoepiphytica Michelang.
- Miconia neolanuginosa Almeda
- Miconia neopectinata Almeda
- Miconia neopilosa Michelang.
- Miconia neosecunda Ocampo & Almeda
- Miconia neosecundiflora Ocampo & Almeda
- Miconia neourceolata Michelang.
- Miconia neriifolia Triana
- Miconia nervosa (Sm.) Triana
- Miconia nervosissima Michelang. & R.Goldenb.
- Miconia neurotricha Cogn.
- Miconia nianga (DC.) R.Goldenb.
- Miconia niangaeformis (Cogn.) R.Goldenb.
- Miconia niederleinii (Cogn.) R.Goldenb.
- Miconia nigricans Cogn.
- Miconia nigripes Cogn. & Gleason
- Miconia nipensis (Britton & P.Wilson) Ionta & Bécquer
- Miconia nitens Benth.
- Miconia nitida (D.Don) Naudin
- Miconia nitidissima Cogn.
- Miconia nobilis Gleason
- Miconia nodosa Cogn.
- Miconia norandina Michelang.
- Miconia nordestina R.Goldenb. & E.C.O.Chagas
- Miconia norlindii (Urb.) Majure & Judd
- Miconia notabilis Triana
- Miconia novemnervia Naudin
- Miconia nubicola Proctor
- Miconia nutans Donn.Sm.
- Miconia nystroemii Ekman

=== O ===
- Miconia obconica Gleason & Wurdack
- Miconia obliqua Gleason
- Miconia oblonga (Gleason) Michelang.
- Miconia obovata Triana
- Miconia obscura (Bonpl.) Naudin
- Miconia obtusa (Griseb.) Triana
- Miconia obtusifolia (Cogn.) Skean, Judd & Majure
- Miconia ocampensis Skean, Judd & Majure
- Miconia ochracea Triana
- Miconia octona (Bonpl.) Judd & Majure
- Miconia octopetala Cogn.
- Miconia odoratissima L.A.Cárdenas
- Miconia oellgaardii E.Cotton
- Miconia oerstediana (O.Berg ex Triana) Michelang.
- Miconia oinochrophylla Donn.Sm.
- Miconia oldemanii Wurdack
- Miconia oleifolia (Griseb.) M.Gómez
- Miconia oligantha Wurdack
- Miconia oligocephala Donn.Sm.
- Miconia oligochaeta (Cham.) R.Goldenb.
- Miconia oligotricha (DC.) Naudin
- Miconia ombrophila Wurdack
- Miconia omissa Bécquer & Michelang.
- Miconia onaensis Wurdack
- Miconia onychocalyx Gilli
- Miconia oocarpa (A.Gray) R.Goldenb.
- Miconia opaca (Brade) R.Goldenb.
- Miconia opacifolia J.F.Macbr.
- Miconia oraria Wurdack
- Miconia orcheotoma Naudin
- Miconia oreogena Wurdack
- Miconia orescia L.Uribe
- Miconia organensis Gardner
- Miconia ortiziae (Kriebel) Michelang.
- Miconia osaensis Aguilar, Kriebel & Almeda
- Miconia ossaeifolia Urb. & Ekman
- Miconia ossaeiformis Naudin
- Miconia ossaeoides (Naudin) Michelang. & Tiernan
- Miconia ostentata (Wurdack) Michelang.
- Miconia ostrina (Gleason) Michelang.
- Miconia ottikeri J.F.Macbr.
- Miconia ottobuchtienii Michelang. & R.Goldenb.
- Miconia ottoschmidtii (Urb.) Majure & Judd
- Miconia ovatifolia (Urb.) Judd, Bécquer & Majure
- Miconia oxyura (Naudin) Michelang.

=== P ===
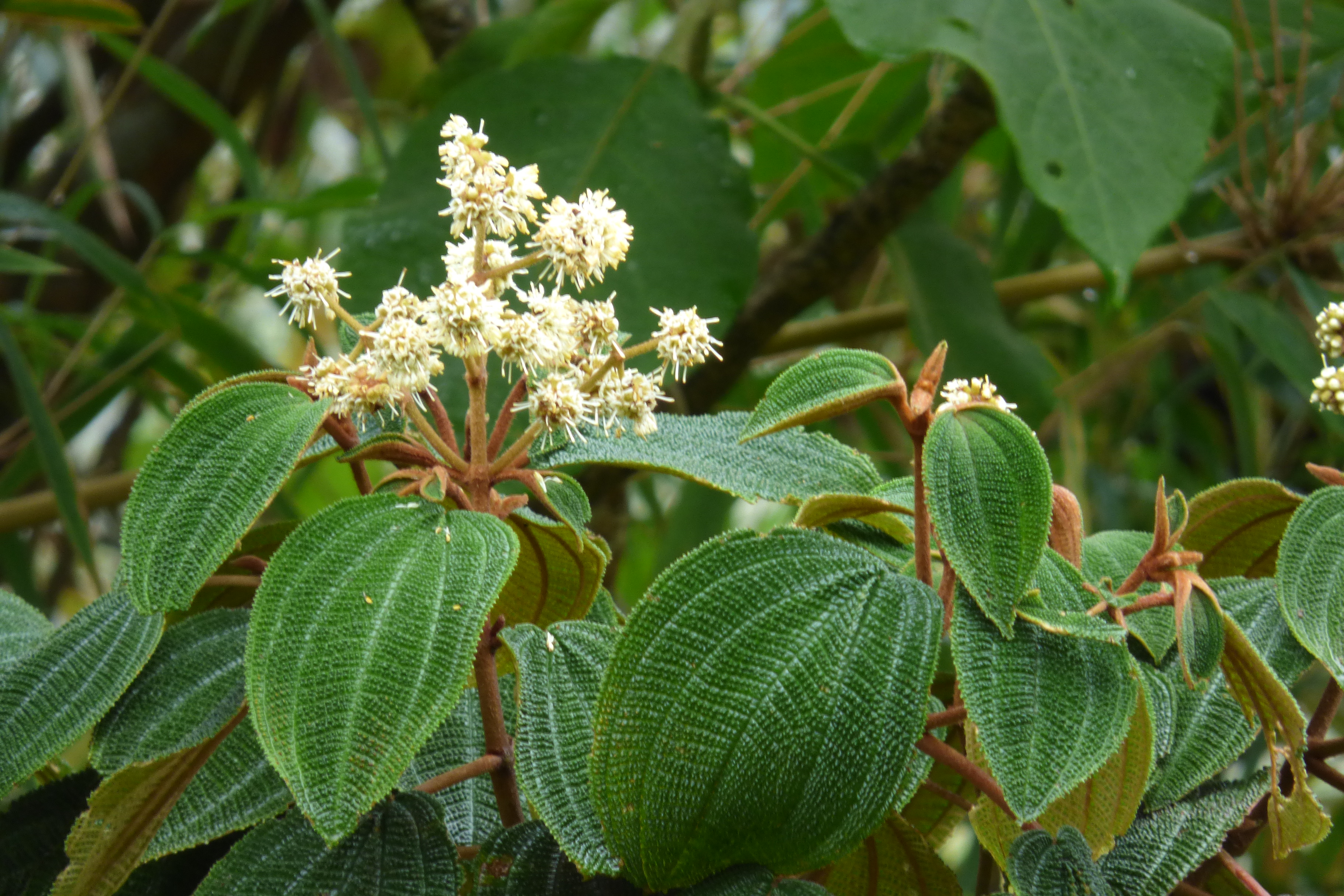
Miconia pustulata

- Miconia pachyantha Bécquer
- Miconia pachydonta Gleason
- Miconia pachyphylla Cogn.
- Miconia pachystachya (Wurdack) Michelang.
- Miconia paeminosa Wurdack
- Miconia pagnolensis Majure & Judd
- Miconia pailasana Wurdack
- Miconia pakaraimae (Wurdack) Michelang.
- Miconia palcazuana Michelang. & R.Goldenb.
- Miconia paleacea Cogn.
- Miconia paleaciramis Michelang. & R.Goldenb.
- Miconia palenquensis (Wurdack) Gamba & Almeda
- Miconia paludigena Wurdack
- Miconia pandurata Triana
- Miconia paniculata (DC.) Naudin
- Miconia papillata (Cogn.) R.Goldenb.
- Miconia papillopetala Kriebel & Almeda
- Miconia papillosa (Desr.) Naudin
- Miconia papillosperma R.Goldenb. & Michelang.
- Miconia paradisica Wurdack
- Miconia paradoxa (Mart. ex DC.) Triana
- Miconia paraguayensis Cogn.
- Miconia paralimoides Majure & Judd
- Miconia paralongicollis (Judd, Ionta, Clase & Skean) Judd & Bécquer
- Miconia parasitica (O.Berg ex Triana) R.Goldenb.
- Miconia parvifolia Cogn.
- Miconia paspaloides Gleason
- Miconia pastazana Wurdack
- Miconia pastoensis Triana
- Miconia paucartambensis Jan.M.Burke & Michelang.
- Miconia paucidens DC.
- Miconia paulina (DC.) R.Goldenb.
- Miconia paupercula (Naudin) Triana
- Miconia pausana Wurdack
- Miconia pavoniana Naudin
- Miconia pectinata (Cogn.) R.Goldenb.
- Miconia pedicellata Cogn.
- Miconia pedunculata Majure & Judd
- Miconia pegueroana Majure, Clase, Pina, Skean & Judd
- Miconia peltata Almeda
- Miconia peltifolia R.Goldenb. & Michelang.
- Miconia pendula Umaña & Almeda
- Miconia penduliflora Cogn.
- Miconia penicillata Gleason
- Miconia penninervis (Griseb.) M.Gómez
- Miconia penningtonii Wurdack
- Miconia pentlandii Naudin
- Miconia pepericarpa DC.
- Miconia perclara (Wurdack) Michelang.
- Miconia perelegans Urb.
- Miconia perezii (Alain) Bécquer & Michelang.
- Miconia pergamentacea Cogn.
- Miconia perijensis Wurdack
- Miconia pernettifolia Triana
- Miconia perobscura Wurdack
- Miconia persicariifolia Cogn.
- Miconia perturbata Wurdack
- Miconia petersonii Urb.
- Miconia petiolaris (Schltdl.) Michelang.
- Miconia petiolata (DC.) Michelang.
- Miconia petroniana Cogn. & Saldanha
- Miconia petropolitana Cogn.
- Miconia phaeochaeta Wurdack
- Miconia phaeophylla Triana
- Miconia phaeotricha Naudin
- Miconia phanerostila Pilg.
- Miconia phelpsiae (Gleason) R.Goldenb. & Michelang.
- Miconia phlebodes Wurdack
- Miconia phrynosomaderma Majure & Judd
- Miconia pichinchensis Benth.
- Miconia picinguabensis R.Goldenb. & A.B.Martins
- Miconia pierreboissieriana R.Goldenb.
- Miconia pilaloensis Wurdack
- Miconia pileata DC.
- Miconia pilifera (Urb.) Ionta & Bécquer
- Miconia pilonensis (Wurdack) R.Goldenb.
- Miconia pilosa (Sw.) Judd & Ionta
- Miconia pilosissima (Cogn.) R.Goldenb.
- Miconia piperifolia Triana
- Miconia piperilamina Michelang.
- Miconia pisinna Wurdack
- Miconia pisinniflora Wurdack
- Miconia pittieri Cogn.
- Miconia planifilamentosa (Brade) R.Goldenb.
- Miconia platyphylla (Benth.) L.O.Williams
- Miconia platypoda Gleason
- Miconia pleiocrassifolia R.Goldenb.
- Miconia pleiofluminensis R.Goldenb. & Michelang.
- Miconia pleioglazioviana R.Goldenb.
- Miconia pleiomagdalenensis R.Goldenb.
- Miconia pleiomicrantha R.Goldenb.
- Miconia pleioparvifolia R.Goldenb.
- Miconia pleiorosea R.Goldenb.
- Miconia pleiosetulosa R.Goldenb.
- Miconia plena Gleason
- Miconia plethorica Naudin
- Miconia plicata (Griseb.) M.Gómez
- Miconia plicatifolia Skean, Judd & Majure
- Miconia plukenetii Naudin
- Miconia plumifera Triana
- Miconia poecilantha L.Uribe
- Miconia poeppigii Triana
- Miconia poiretii (Griseb.) M.Gómez
- Miconia polita Gleason
- Miconia polyadena (Ule) R.Goldenb. & Michelang.
- Miconia polyandra Gardner
- Miconia polychaeta Wurdack
- Miconia polyflora Skean, Judd & Majure
- Miconia polygama Cogn.
- Miconia polyneura Triana
- Miconia polystachya (Naudin) R.Goldenb.
- Miconia polytopica Wurdack
- Miconia poortmannii (Cogn.) Wurdack
- Miconia popayanensis Wurdack
- Miconia porphyrotricha (Markgr.) Wurdack
- Miconia portogallensis J.R.Santiago & F.A.Michelang.
- Miconia portoricensis (Alain) Ionta, Judd & Skean
- Miconia povedae Kriebel & Oviedo
- Miconia pozoensis Wurdack
- Miconia pozuzoana L.A.Cárdenas & Michelang.
- Miconia prancei Wurdack
- Miconia prasina (Sw.) DC.
- Miconia prasinifolia Gleason
- Miconia pratensis Judd, Bécquer & Majure
- Miconia prietoi Wurdack
- Miconia proctorii Judd
- Miconia procumbens (Gleason) Wurdack
- Miconia prominens Wurdack
- Miconia protuberans Wurdack
- Miconia pseudoalternifolia Michelang.
- Miconia pseudoaplostachya Cogn.
- Miconia pseudocapsularis Wurdack
- Miconia pseudocentrophora Cogn.
- Miconia pseudodebilis Michelang.
- Miconia pseudofloribunda (Bécquer) Bécquer & Michelang.
- Miconia pseudonervosa Cogn.
- Miconia pseudopauciflora Bécquer & Majure
- Miconia pseudopedicellata Judd & Bécquer
- Miconia pseudopinetorum (Borhidi & O.Muñiz) Judd, Bécquer & Majure
- Miconia pseudoradula Cogn. & Gleason
- Miconia pseudorigida Proctor
- Miconia psychrophila Naudin
- Miconia pterocaulon Triana
- Miconia pteroclada Urb.
- Miconia pterosepala Urb.
- Miconia puberula Cogn.
- Miconia pubescens (Gleason) Michelang.
- Miconia pubicalyx Gleason
- Miconia pubipetala Miq.
- Miconia pubistyla (Wurdack) R.Goldenb.
- Miconia pujana Markgr.
- Miconia pulchra Cogn.
- Miconia pulgari J.F.Macbr.
- Miconia pulverata Judd, Bécquer & Majure
- Miconia pulverulenta Ruiz & Pav.
- Miconia pulvinata Gleason
- Miconia punctata (Desr.) D.Don ex DC.
- Miconia punctibullata M.E.Morales, Michelang. & F.González
- Miconia punicea Wurdack
- Miconia puracensis Wurdack
- Miconia purpurea (D.Don) Judd & Skean
- Miconia purpureovillosa (Hoehne) R.Goldenb.
- Miconia purpureoviolacea (Cogn.) Michelang.
- Miconia purpuriflora Michelang. & R.Goldenb.
- Miconia purulensis Donn.Sm.
- Miconia pusilliflora (DC.) Naudin
- Miconia pustulata Naudin
- Miconia pycnantha (Urb. & Ekman) Ionta, Judd & Skean
- Miconia pycnaster (Tutin) Michelang.
- Miconia pycnoneura Urb.
- Miconia pyramidalis DC.
- Miconia pyrifolia Naudin
- Miconia pyxidata (Proctor) Michelang.

=== Q ===
- Miconia quadrangularis (Sw.) Naudin
- Miconia quadrialata S.S.Renner & S.Beck
- Miconia quadricaulis Michelang.
- Miconia quadridomius Gamba & Almeda
- Miconia quadrifolia Naudin
- Miconia quadripora Wurdack
- Miconia quadrisulca (Naudin) Ocampo & Almeda
- Miconia quartzicola R.Goldenb., Bacci & Bochorny
- Miconia quinquedentata (DC.) R.Goldenb.
- Miconia quinquenervia (Mill.) Gamba & Almeda
- Miconia quinquenodis (DC.) R.Goldenb.
- Miconia quintuplinervia Cogn.

=== R ===
- Miconia racemifera (DC.) Triana
- Miconia racemosa (Aubl.) DC.
- Miconia raddii R.Goldenb.
- Miconia radicans (Cogn. ex Donn.Sm.) Gamba & Almeda
- Miconia radula Cogn.
- Miconia radulifolia (Benth.) Naudin
- Miconia raggiana (Michelang.) Michelang.
- Miconia raimondiana (Markgr.) R.Goldenb. & Michelang.
- Miconia ramboi Brade
- Miconia rangeliana C.Wright ex Griseb.
- Miconia rariflora (Humb. & Bonpl.) Michelang.
- Miconia rava Wurdack
- Miconia ravenii Wurdack
- Miconia reburrosa Wurdack
- Miconia reclinata Naudin
- Miconia recondita Wurdack
- Miconia reducens Triana
- Miconia reflexa (Gleason) Michelang.
- Miconia reflexipila Wurdack
- Miconia refracta (Cogn.) R.Goldenb.
- Miconia regelii Cogn.
- Miconia reitziana (Cogn. & Gleason) Gamba & Almeda
- Miconia reitzii (Wurdack) R.Goldenb.
- Miconia remotiflora Urb.
- Miconia renatogoldenbergii Meirelles & Bacci
- Miconia renatoi Gamba & Almeda
- Miconia renneri E.Cotton
- Miconia repens (Triana) Michelang.
- Miconia reptans (R.Goldenb. & Reginato) R.Goldenb.
- Miconia resima Naudin
- Miconia resimoides Cogn.
- Miconia resinosa (Gleason) Michelang.
- Miconia reticulata Triana
- Miconia reticulatovenosa Judd, Bécquer & Majure
- Miconia retusa Pilg.
- Miconia reversa (DC.) Ocampo & Almeda
- Miconia revolutifolia Skean, Judd & Majure
- Miconia rhamnifolia (Naudin) Ocampo & Almeda
- Miconia rheophytica Posada-Herrera & Almeda
- Miconia rhodantha Wurdack
- Miconia rhodopetala (Donn.Sm.) Michelang.
- Miconia rhodopogon (DC.) R.Goldenb.
- Miconia rhombifolia Alain
- Miconia rhomboidea (Urb. & Ekman) Skean & Judd
- Miconia rhonhofiae Markgr.
- Miconia rhytidophylla Naudin
- Miconia ribesiiflora (Cham.) R.Goldenb.
- Miconia ricardoi Kriebel & Almeda
- Miconia richardsprucei Michelang.
- Miconia riedeliana (Triana) R.Goldenb.
- Miconia rigens Naudin
- Miconia rigida (Sw.) Triana
- Miconia rigidissima Urb. & Ekman
- Miconia rimachii Wurdack
- Miconia rimalis Naudin
- Miconia rimbachii Wurdack
- Miconia riograndensis (Brade) R.Goldenb.
- Miconia riparia Triana
- Miconia rivalis Wurdack
- Miconia rivetii Danguy & Cherm.
- Miconia robinsoniana Cogn.
- Miconia robusta Cogn.
- Miconia rodriguezii (Almeda) Almeda
- Miconia rondoniensis Meirelles & R.Goldenb.
- Miconia ronliesneri Michelang.
- Miconia roraimensis Ule
- Miconia rosea Gleason
- Miconia roseopetala Michelang.
- Miconia rosmarinifolia (Griseb.) M.Gómez
- Miconia rotundifolia (D.Don) Naudin
- Miconia rubella (Raddi) R.Goldenb.
- Miconia rubens (Sw.) Naudin
- Miconia rubescens (Triana) Gamba & Almeda
- Miconia rubida (Cogn.) R.Goldenb.
- Miconia rubiginosa (Bonpl.) DC.
- Miconia rubra (Aubl.) Mabb.
- Miconia rubricans Triana
- Miconia rubrinervis (Naudin) Judd & Bécquer
- Miconia rubripetala Michelang.
- Miconia rubripila (Cogn.) Judd & Ionta
- Miconia rubrisetulosa Ionta, Judd & Skean
- Miconia ruddae (Wurdack) Michelang.
- Miconia rufa (Griseb.) Triana
- Miconia rufescens (Aubl.) DC.
- Miconia rufibarbis (Triana) Gamba & Almeda
- Miconia ruficalyx Gleason
- Miconia ruficaulis Ionta & Bécquer
- Miconia rufinervis Judd
- Miconia rufipila Triana
- Miconia rufiramea Wurdack
- Miconia rufistellata Judd & Majure
- Miconia rufoalpestris Skean, Judd & Majure
- Miconia rufostellulata Pittier
- Miconia rugifolia Triana
- Miconia rugosa Triana
- Miconia ruizii Naudin
- Miconia ruizteranii Wurdack
- Miconia rupestris Ule
- Miconia rupicola Gleason
- Miconia rupticalyx Wurdack
- Miconia rusbyana Cogn.
- Miconia ruschiana Caddah & R.Goldenb.
- Miconia russea Wurdack
- Miconia rzedowskii de Santiago

=== S ===
- Miconia sabiaensis (Brade) R.Goldenb.
- Miconia sagotiana Cogn.
- Miconia salebrosa Wurdack
- Miconia salicifolia Naudin
- Miconia salicina (Ser. ex DC.) Mabb.
- Miconia saltuensis Wurdack
- Miconia samanensis Urb.
- Miconia sancti-philippi Naudin
- Miconia sandemanii Wurdack
- Miconia sandwithii (Wurdack) Michelang.
- Miconia sanguinea (D.Don) Triana
- Miconia santanana Judd & Skean
- Miconia santaremensis Wurdack
- Miconia santaritensis Almeda
- Miconia santos-limae (Brade) R.Goldenb.
- Miconia sarmentosa Cogn.
- Miconia sastrei Wurdack
- Miconia saulensis (Wurdack) Michelang.
- Miconia savannarum R.O.Williams
- Miconia saxatilis J.F.Macbr.
- Miconia saxicola Brandegee
- Miconia scabra Cogn.
- Miconia scabrosa (L.) Ionta, Judd & Skean
- Miconia scalpta (Vent.) Ionta, Judd & Skean
- Miconia schippii Standl.
- Miconia schlechtendalii Cogn.
- Miconia schlimii Triana
- Miconia schnellii Wurdack
- Miconia schunkei Wurdack
- Miconia schwackei Cogn.
- Miconia sciaphila Judd & Ionta
- Miconia sciurea L.Uribe
- Miconia sclerophylla Triana
- Miconia scopulina (Brandegee) Michelang.
- Miconia scutata Gleason
- Miconia secuncaquetana Ocampo & Almeda
- Miconia secunda R.A.Howard & E.A.Kellogg
- Miconia secundiflora Cogn.
- Miconia secundifolia Cogn.
- Miconia secundivaricata Ocampo & Almeda
- Miconia secundoangustifolia M.Gómez
- Miconia secundolanceolata M.Gómez
- Miconia secunfrancavillana Ocampo & Almeda
- Miconia secungrandifolia Ocampo & Almeda
- Miconia secunlongisepala Ocampo & Almeda
- Miconia secunmacdanielii Ocampo & Almeda
- Miconia secunmaguirei Ocampo & Almeda
- Miconia secunmexicana Ocampo & Almeda
- Miconia secunneblinensis Ocampo & Almeda
- Miconia secunpastazana Ocampo & Almeda
- Miconia secunpetiolaris Ocampo & Almeda
- Miconia secunretropila Ocampo & Almeda
- Miconia secunrotundifolia Ocampo & Almeda
- Miconia secunsanguinea Ocampo & Almeda
- Miconia selleana Urb. & Ekman
- Miconia sellowiana Naudin
- Miconia semijuga (Gleason) Michelang.
- Miconia semisterilis Gleason
- Miconia seposita Wurdack
- Miconia septentrionalis Judd & R.S.Beaman
- Miconia serialis DC.
- Miconia sericea (D.Don) Michelang.
- Miconia serpens (Triana) Michelang.
- Miconia serrulata (DC.) Naudin
- Miconia sessiliflora (Naudin) Michelang.
- Miconia sessilifolia Naudin
- Miconia sessilis Gamba & Almeda
- Miconia seticaulis Wurdack
- Miconia setifera (Pilg.) Michelang.
- Miconia setimarginata Pittier
- Miconia setosa Wurdack
- Miconia setosociliata Cogn.
- Miconia setulosa Cogn.
- Miconia shaferi Cogn.
- Miconia shattuckii Standl.
- Miconia shepherdii R.Goldenb. & Reginato
- Miconia siapensis (Wurdack) Michelang.
- Miconia silicicola Gleason
- Miconia silverstonei Wurdack
- Miconia silvicola (Gleason) Michelang.
- Miconia silviphila Michelang.
- Miconia simplex Triana
- Miconia simplicicaulis (Naudin) R.Goldenb.
- Miconia simpsonii (Wurdack) Michelang.
- Miconia sintenisii Cogn.
- Miconia skeaniana Judd
- Miconia skutchiana Michelang.
- Miconia smaragdina Naudin
- Miconia smithii Cogn.
- Miconia sneidernii Wurdack
- Miconia sodiroi Wurdack
- Miconia solearis (Naudin) Gamba & Almeda
- Miconia solenifera (Cogn.) Ocampo & Almeda
- Miconia sordida Triana
- Miconia sororopana Michelang.
- Miconia spadiciflora (Triana) Michelang.
- Miconia spanantha Judd & Majure
- Miconia sparrei Wurdack
- Miconia sparsisetulosa (Hoehne) R.Goldenb.
- Miconia spatellophora Gleason
- Miconia speciosa (A.St.-Hil. & Naudin) Naudin
- Miconia spectabilis (Gleason) Michelang.
- Miconia spennerostachya Naudin
- Miconia sphaerocarpa (Cogn.) R.Goldenb.
- Miconia sphagnicola Urb. & Ekman
- Miconia spicata (Gleason) Gamba & Almeda
- Miconia spicellata Bonpl. ex Naudin
- Miconia spichigeri Wurdack
- Miconia spinulidentata Cogn. & Gleason
- Miconia spinulosa Naudin
- Miconia spiraeifolia Triana
- Miconia spiritusanctensis R.Goldenb., Bacci & Bochorny
- Miconia splendens (Sw.) Griseb.
- Miconia sprucei Triana
- Miconia squamulosa (Sm.) Triana
- Miconia staminea (Desr.) DC.
- Miconia staphidioides (Naudin) Triana
- Miconia steinbachii Markgr.
- Miconia stelligera Cogn.
- Miconia stellulata Gleason
- Miconia stellulitricha R.Goldenb. & Michelang.
- Miconia stenobotrys (Rich.) Naudin
- Miconia stenocardia Cogn.
- Miconia stenopetala Griseb.
- Miconia stenophylla Wurdack
- Miconia stenoptera (Gleason) Michelang.
- Miconia stenostachya DC.
- Miconia stenourea Triana
- Miconia stephananthera Ule
- Miconia stephanotricha (Naudin) Michelang.
- Miconia stephentillettii Michelang.
- Miconia sterilis Gleason
- Miconia stevensiana Almeda
- Miconia steyermarkii Gleason
- Miconia stipitata Gleason
- Miconia stipularis Naudin
- Miconia striata Cogn.
- Miconia strigilliflora (Naudin) R.Goldenb.
- Miconia strigillosa (Sw.) Judd & Ionta
- Miconia strigosa (Triana) Wurdack
- Miconia stylosa Cogn.
- Miconia suaveolens Wurdack
- Miconia subalpina Gleason
- Miconia subandicola Wurdack
- Miconia subciliata DC.
- Miconia subcompressa Urb.
- Miconia subcordata Cogn.
- Miconia subcrustulata Beurl.
- Miconia suberosa Meirelles & R.Goldenb.
- Miconia subglabra Cogn.
- Miconia subhirsuta (DC.) M.Gómez
- Miconia sublanata (Cogn.) R.Goldenb.
- Miconia submacrophylla Gleason
- Miconia submontana (Rose ex Gleason) Michelang.
- Miconia subnodosa Triana
- Miconia subobruta (Wurdack) R.Goldenb. & Michelang.
- Miconia suborbicularis Cogn.
- Miconia subpeltata (Kriebel & Almeda) Almeda
- Miconia subseriata (Naudin) R.Goldenb. & Michelang.
- Miconia subsessilifolia Wurdack
- Miconia subsimplex Pilg.
- Miconia subspicata Wurdack
- Miconia subtrinervis (Cogn.) R.Goldenb.
- Miconia subulata (Gleason) R.Goldenb. & Michelang.
- Miconia subulipetala Wurdack
- Miconia subvernicosa Cogn.
- Miconia sulbahiensis (D'El Rei Souza) R.Goldenb.
- Miconia sulcata J.F.Macbr.
- Miconia sulcicaulis (Poepp. ex Naudin) Ocampo & Almeda
- Miconia sulfurea (Naudin) R.Goldenb.
- Miconia summa Cuatrec.
- Miconia superba Ule
- Miconia superposita Wurdack
- Miconia suprabasalis (R.Goldenb. & Reginato) R.Goldenb.
- Miconia susannae (Borhidi) Bécquer & Michelang.
- Miconia sylvatica Naudin
- Miconia symphyandra Triana
- Miconia symplocoidea Triana

=== T ===
- Miconia tabayensis Wurdack
- Miconia tacanensis Wurdack
- Miconia tachirensis Wurdack
- Miconia talamancensis Almeda
- Miconia tamana Wurdack
- Miconia taurina (Gleason) Michelang.
- Miconia tenebrosa (Almeda) Almeda
- Miconia tenensis Markgr.
- Miconia tentaculicapitata Majure & Judd
- Miconia tentaculifera Naudin
- Miconia tenuifolia (Donn.Sm.) Michelang.
- Miconia tenuis Triana
- Miconia teotepecensis de Santiago
- Miconia tephrodes Wurdack
- Miconia tepicana Standl.
- Miconia tepuiensis (Wurdack) Michelang.
- Miconia terboghii Wurdack
- Miconia terera Naudin
- Miconia ternata (Cogn.) R.Goldenb.
- Miconia ternatifolia Triana
- Miconia tetragona Cogn.
- Miconia tetragonoloba (Cogn.) Judd, Bécquer & Majure
- Miconia tetramera (Urb. & Ekman) Bécquer
- Miconia tetrandra (Sw.) D.Don
- Miconia tetrapetala (Almeda) Almeda
- Miconia tetraptera (Cogn.) Ionta, Judd & Skean
- Miconia tetraquetra (Cham.) R.Goldenb.
- Miconia tetrasperma Gleason
- Miconia tetraspermoides Wurdack
- Miconia tetrastoma Naudin
- Miconia tetrazygioidea Bécquer & Judd
- Miconia tetrazygioides Urb. & Ekman
- Miconia thaminantha Wurdack
- Miconia theaezans (Bonpl.) Cogn.
- Miconia therezopolitana (Cogn.) R.Goldenb.
- Miconia thomasiana DC.
- Miconia thyrsiflora (Triana) Naudin
- Miconia thysanophylla Wurdack
- Miconia tiliifolia Naudin
- Miconia tillettii Wurdack
- Miconia tinifolia Naudin
- Miconia tiri Triana
- Miconia titanophylla Gleason
- Miconia tixixensis Standl. & Steyerm.
- Miconia tocoaristata Michelang.
- Miconia tocobovata Michelang.
- Miconia tococa (Desr.) Michelang.
- Miconia tococapitata Michelang.
- Miconia tococaudata Michelang.
- Miconia tocociliata Michelang.
- Miconia tococinnamomea Michelang.
- Miconia tococoidea (DC.) Michelang.
- Miconia tococordata Michelang.
- Miconia tococoronata Michelang.
- Miconia tocohirta Michelang.
- Miconia tocopauciflora Michelang.
- Miconia tocoracemifera Michelang.
- Miconia tomentosa (Rich.) D.Don
- Miconia tonduzii Cogn.
- Miconia torbeciana (Urb. & Ekman) Skean & Judd
- Miconia toroi Gleason
- Miconia tovarensis Cogn.
- Miconia traillii Cogn.
- Miconia transversa Gleason
- Miconia trauninensis (Cogn.) R.Goldenb.
- Miconia trianae Cogn.
- Miconia trianana Judd & Bécquer
- Miconia triangularis Gleason
- Miconia triantha (E.A.Camargo & R.Goldenb.) R.Goldenb.
- Miconia tricaudata Wurdack
- Miconia trichocalyx (Pittier) Michelang. & Judd
- Miconia trichogona J.F.Macbr.
- Miconia trichophora Gleason
- Miconia trichosantha (Almeda) Almeda
- Miconia trichotoma (Desr.) DC.
- Miconia tricostata (Urb. & Ekman) Skean, Judd & Majure
- Miconia trimera Wurdack
- Miconia trinervia (Sw.) D.Don ex G.Don
- Miconia trinitensis (Crueg.) Michelang.
- Miconia triplinervis Ruiz & Pav.
- Miconia tristis Spring
- Miconia trujillensis Wurdack
- Miconia truncata Triana
- Miconia tschudyoides Cogn.
- Miconia tuberculata (Naudin) Triana
- Miconia tubulosa Gleason
- Miconia tuckeri Gleason
- Miconia tuerckheimii Cogn.
- Miconia turbinata (Urb. & Ekman) Skean & Judd
- Miconia turgida Gleason
- Miconia turquinensis Urb. & Ekman

=== U ===
- Miconia ulei (Cogn.) R.Goldenb.
- Miconia uliginosa (Brade) R.Goldenb.
- Miconia ulmarioides Naudin
- Miconia umbellata (Mill.) Judd & Ionta
- Miconia umbriensis Wurdack
- Miconia umbrosa Cogn.
- Miconia undabunda (J.F.Macbr.) Michelang.
- Miconia undata Triana
- Miconia uninervis Alain
- Miconia urbaniana Cogn.
- Miconia urbanii (Cogn.) Judd
- Miconia urceolata Urb.
- Miconia uribei Wurdack
- Miconia urophylla DC.
- Miconia urticilamina Michelang.
- Miconia urticoides Triana
- Miconia utleyana (Almeda) Almeda
- Miconia uvida Wurdack
- Miconia uvifera Naudin

=== V ===
- Miconia vaccinioides (Bonpl.) Naudin
- Miconia valentinensis Bacci & R.Goldenb.
- Miconia valenzuelana Michelang. & R.Goldenb.
- Miconia valeriana (Standl.) Wurdack
- Miconia valida Cogn.
- Miconia vallartensis Zabalg., Figueroa & Muñiz-Castro
- Miconia vallensis Wurdack
- Miconia vallicola (Gleason) Michelang.
- Miconia valtheri Naudin
- Miconia vargasii Wurdack
- Miconia variabilis Gamba & Almeda
- Miconia variifolia (Wurdack) Michelang.
- Miconia vazquezii (Borhidi & O.Muñiz) Ionta & Bécquer
- Miconia vegaensis (Cogn.) Judd, Bécquer & Majure
- Miconia velutina Triana
- Miconia venosa (Gleason) Michelang.
- Miconia ventricosa (Almeda) Almeda
- Miconia venulosa Wurdack
- Miconia veraguensis Gamba & Almeda
- Miconia verapazana Michelang.
- Miconia verrucosa Cogn.
- Miconia verruculosa (Wurdack) P.Jørg. & C.Ulloa
- Miconia versicolor Naudin
- Miconia verticalis (N.Ruiz-R.) Michelang.
- Miconia verticillifolia Michelang. & R.Goldenb.
- Miconia vesca Wurdack
- Miconia vesiculosa (Cogn.) R.Goldenb.
- Miconia vestita Almeda
- Miconia victorinii Alain
- Miconia vilhenensis Wurdack
- Miconia villonacensis Wurdack
- Miconia vincentina (Urb.) Judd & Ionta
- Miconia violacea Cogn.
- Miconia violascens (Pilg.) Michelang. & R.Goldenb.
- Miconia virescens (Vahl) Triana
- Miconia virgata (Sw.) Skean, Judd & Majure
- Miconia viridiflava (Brade) R.Goldenb.
- Miconia viscidula Urb. & Cogn.
- Miconia viscosa (Cogn.) R.Goldenb.
- Miconia vismioides Triana
- Miconia vitiflora J.F.Macbr.
- Miconia vittata (Linden & André) Cogn.
- Miconia volcanalis (Standl. & Steyerm.) Michelang.
- Miconia voronovii Gleason
- Miconia vulcanicola (Donn.Sm.) Michelang.
- Miconia vulcanidomatia Bécquer & Skean

=== W ===
- Miconia wagneri J.F.Macbr.
- Miconia waimiri-atroari Meirelles & Caddah
- Miconia waltercampii Michelang.
- Miconia walterjuddii Bécquer & Michelang.
- Miconia warmingiana Cogn.
- Miconia weberbaueri Cogn.
- Miconia weddellii Naudin
- Miconia willdenowii Klotzsch ex Naudin
- Miconia williamandersonii Michelang.
- Miconia wittii Ule
- Miconia wolfei Wurdack
- Miconia woodsii (Judd & Skean) Ionta, Judd & Skean
- Miconia woytkowskii Wurdack
- Miconia wrightiana (Griseb.) Greuter & R.Rankin
- Miconia wrightii (Griseb.) Triana
- Miconia wurdackii L.Uribe

=== X ===
- Miconia xalapensis (Bonpl.) M.Gómez
- Miconia xanthocoma (Naudin) R.Goldenb.
- Miconia xantholasia (DC.) R.Goldenb.
- Miconia xanthopogon (Naudin) R.Goldenb.
- Miconia xanthostachya (Cogn.) R.Goldenb.
- Miconia xenotricha Urb. & Ekman

=== Y ===
- Miconia yamanigueyensis Bécquer & Michelang.
- Miconia yanachagaensis Michelang. & R.Goldenb.
- Miconia yatuensis Wurdack
- Miconia yeseniae W.Palacios, D.Fernández & Michelang.
- Miconia yungasensis R.Goldenb. & Michelang.
- Miconia yunquensis Judd, Bécquer & Majure

=== Z ===
- Miconia zamorensis Gleason
- Miconia zanonii Judd, Skean & Beaman
- Miconia zarucchii Wurdack
- Miconia zemurrayana Standl. & L.O.Williams
- Miconia zubenetana J.F.Macbr.
