= Sexual selection in flowering plants =

Mechanism of evolution involving male gamete competition and cryptic female choice

Sexual selection is a mechanism of evolution in which members of one sex choose mates of the other sex to mate with (inter-sexual selection), and compete with members of the same sex for access to members of the opposite sex (intra-sexual selection). It is an accepted concept in animal evolution, but it is more controversial in botany. Sexual selection in plants could work through two principal mechanisms:

- Intra-sexual (male–male) competition: Competing pollen donors vie for ovule fertilization via traits such as pollen packaging, timing of release, and flower morphology.
- Female or pistil-mediated mate choice: Post-pollination filters—such as pollen-recipient compatibility, pollen-tube growth rates, and selective seed abortion — enable differential siring success.

These two mechanisms are, in theory, the main driving forces of sexual selection in flowering plants and their potential relevance to botany is clear, but more complicated than in zoology. The complexity of applying the concept of sexual selection to plants arises from the fact that most plants are hermaphrodites and are non-sentient, meaning that the more obvious elements of female choice (e.g. aesthetic judgments on male secondary sexual characteristics) do not apply. The research challenge currently facing botanists is mainly an empirical one — it involves addressing in a comprehensive way the "empirical question of how often these processes have actually shaped plant evolution in important ways."

== Floral symmetry ==
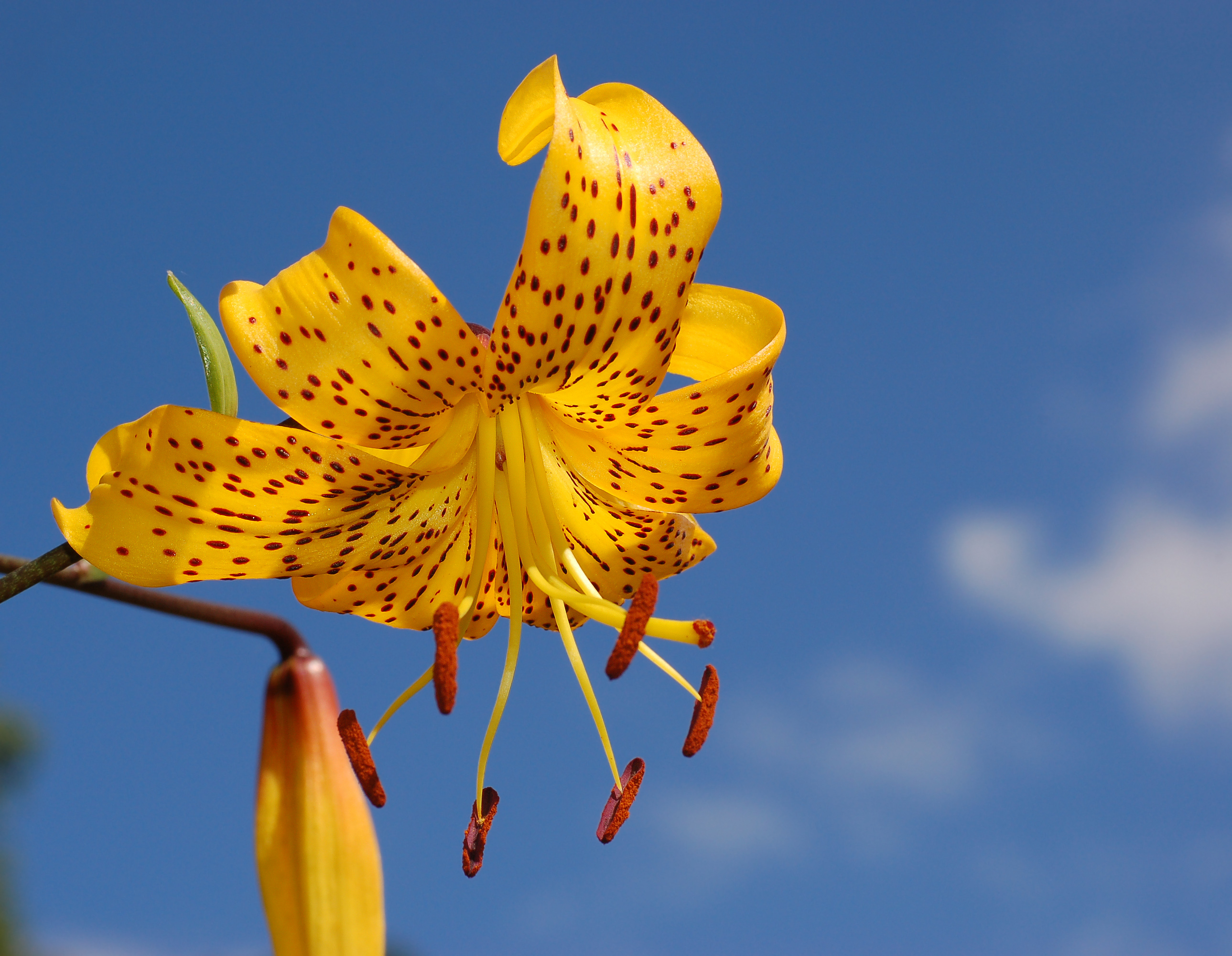
Floral structure of Citronella flower

Floral symmetry describes whether, and how, a flower, in particular its perianth, can be divided into two or more identical or mirror-image parts. Floral characteristics such as symmetry may be subject to strong directional selection from pollinators, and this may disrupt developmental homeostasis in flowers that can develop into large degrees of fluctuating asymmetry.

Fluctuating asymmetry in floral traits may lead to sexual selection in plants if pollinators visit symmetrical flowers in an assortative manner. Numerous studies have shown that pollinators preferentially visited more symmetrical floral patterns in flowers, and there are several reasons why such pollinator preference exists. First, the preference may be present due to positive reinforcement. From experience, pollinators may learn that asymmetrical flowers provide a smaller rewards than symmetrical ones. Second, pollinators with sensory biases could be predisposed to select symmetrical flowers. This pollinator preference can lead to symmetrical flowers that are fertilized more often. This increase in fertilization frequency increases the amount of seeds produced, and results in an increased production of offspring with symmetrical, attractive flowers.

== Sexual dimorphisms ==
Numerous examples of sexual dimorphisms are found in the plant kingdom. Sexual dimorphic differences include bud abortion, flower size, flower number per plant, floral longevity, nutrient content of flowers, nectar production, flowering phenology and periodicity, floral fragrances, floral defense against herbivory, and various inflorescence characteristics including total flower number, daily display size, and inflorescence architecture.

In animal-pollinated species, these differences affect pollinator visitation, competition for mates, and the evolution of sexual dimorphisms. However, there are constraints placed on animal-pollinated species, because too much divergence could interfere with mating success if pollinators are more attracted to one sex than the other, or if the sexes attract different pollinators. Such constraints are absent from wind-pollinated plants, and the contrasting biophysical requirements for pollen dispersal and pollen capture have led to striking cases of sexual dimorphism in plant architecture and flower production in some species. Below are some specific examples of sexual dimorphisms in flowering plants.

=== Inflorescences ===
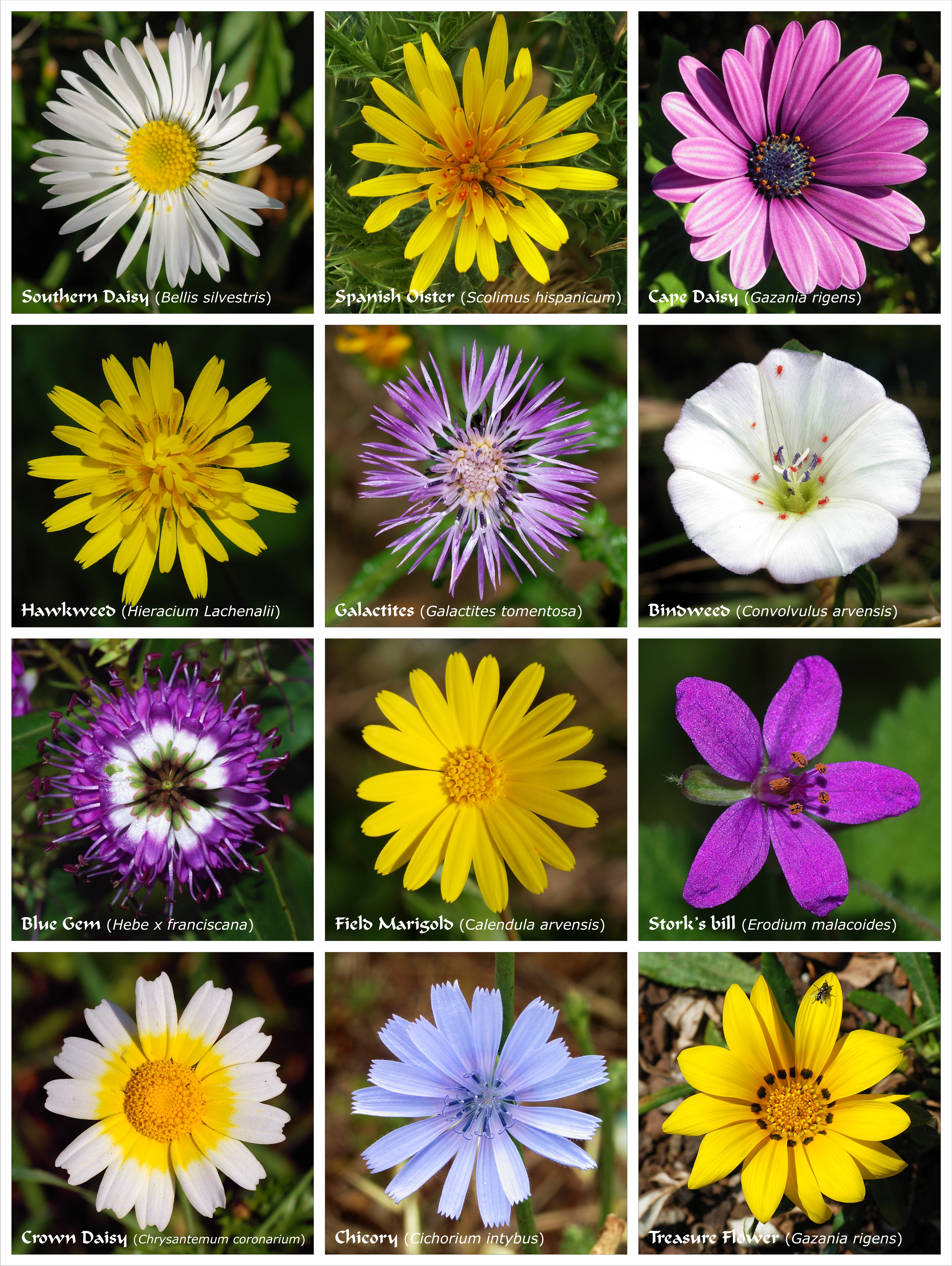
Corolla Differences

Inflorescences (clusters of flowers) can be acted on by sexual selection in many ways, including by influencing arrangement, number, and size. For example, male inflorescences in plants often produce more flowers than female inflorescences. Furthermore, pollen export and ultimately paternity, often increases with flower number, even for plants with hermaphroditic flowers. Retention of older flowers with no pollinator rewards can lead to increased pollinator visitation rate and increased pollen removal. Studies suggest that there has been selection for increased pollen delivery, achieved through greater inflorescence size, and it seems probable that male-male competition is commonly part of that selection pressure.

=== Corolla ===
Corollas are the petals of flowers, and also face sexual selection. Traits such as color, shape, size, and symmetry are often faced by sexually selected pressure. One example is that male flowers are often larger than female flowers, at least in some species. Although this is presumably achieved through resource allocation mechanisms, it is unlikely that resource allocation from lower cost of androecium than gynoecium leading to higher expenditure on corolla in males, is a general and complete explanation of the size differences. Some corolla enlargement may arise by means of selection on correlated characters such as pollen production. However, it is likely that male competition often contributes directly to the evolution of large male corollas, especially where pollen availability is not limiting.

=== Nectar production ===
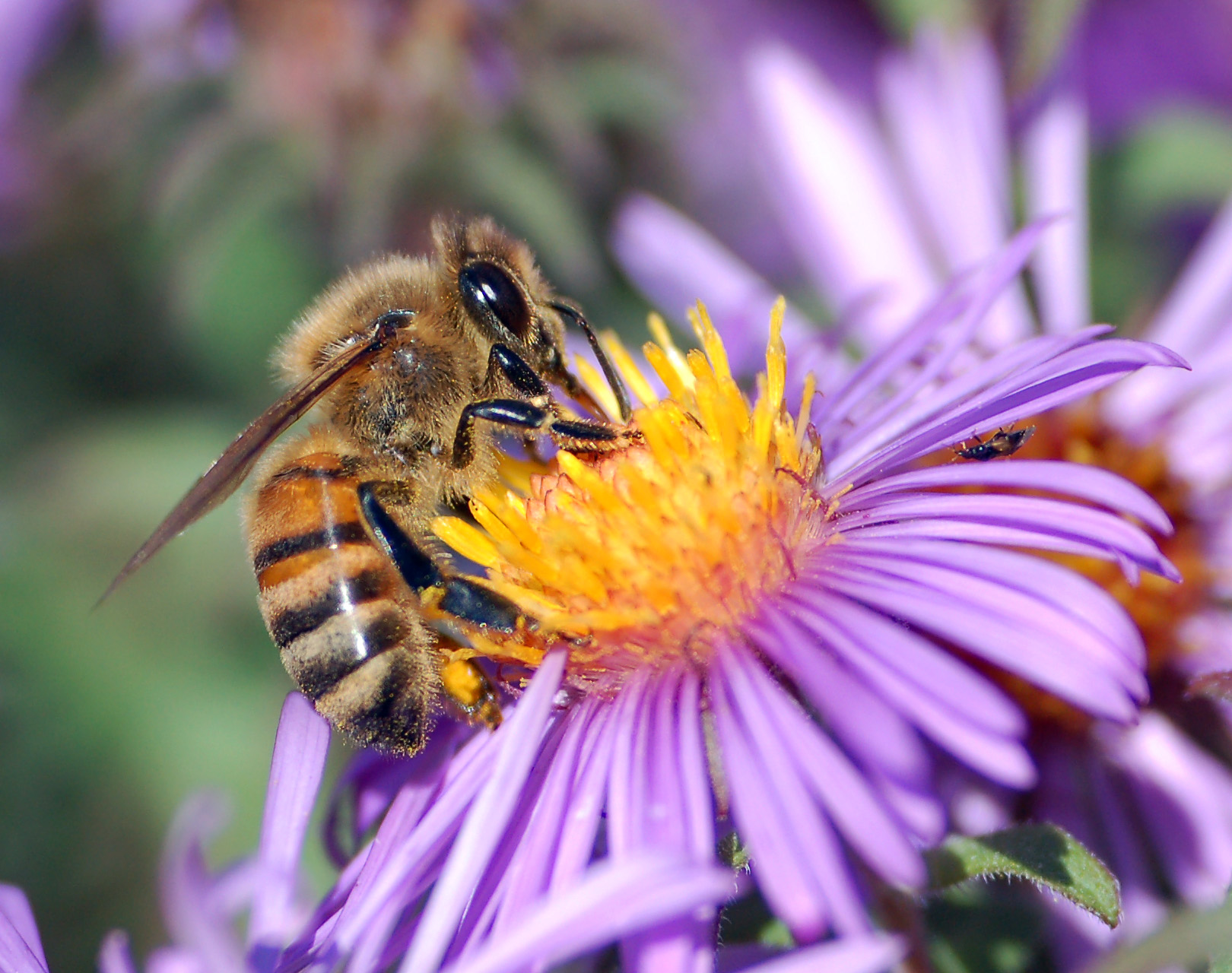
European Honey Bee extracting nectar.

The flowers of most angiosperms produce nectar. Nectar production (sugar concentration, quantity of nectar, timing relative to floral gender phases) is different for every flowering plant that produces nectar, and has many different selective forces acting upon it. There is no single evolutionary force that drives nectar production, but it is believed that sexual selection plays a major role. Studies have supported the idea that sexual selection is a probable explanation for at least some species with gender-biased nectar production.

For example, gender-biased expression of nectar is often accompanied by a similarly biased expression of other floral characteristics. A specific example comes from the flowers of Impatiens capensis, which show increased longevity of the more-rewarding male phase. In other species, petals can be seen to wilt notably during the less- rewarding female phase or they change color as they pass into the less-rewarding female phase.

More evidence for sexually selected nectar production relies on specific behaviors of the pollinators. If sexual selection is currently maintaining gender-biased nectar production, pollinators must be able to distinguish between male and female phase flowers. They also must visit preferentially flowers of the more-rewarding phase. For species that have discriminating pollinators, increased rewards can result in increased mating success, which would allow nectar to be a sexually selected trait.

== Androcium (Stamens) ==
Female and male reproductive systems

The stamens (male reproductive organs of a flower — collectively known as the Androecium) can be subject to sexual selection pressures.This is particularly evident in pollen production, as there may be several sources of sexual selection on the ways that pollen is presented to pollen vectors. Pollen is packaged in units that ensure that several or many pollen grains travel together during dispersion — as in pollinia, polyads, viscin threads. Pollen donors may be able to monopolize stigmas and the associated ovules by blocking access by other males, unless selection also favors compensating stigma enlargement.

Furthermore, when pollen germination depends on some minimum number of pollen grains to overcome stigmatic inhibition — a mechanism that heightens male competition — there may be selection in favor of large pollen dispersal units or certain other pollen-dispensing mechanisms. If pollinator visits are few, then there is selection to package pollen in a way that all of it can be removed by one visit. When repeated pollinator visits are typical, there may be selection for various temporal patterns of pollen presentation and various methods of pollen dispensing. Variation in stamen length, both within and among flowers influences pollen dispersal and potential male reproductive success. Increasing the opportunity for paternity by distributing pollen among pollinators may take different routes in different systems, and any of these possibilities can be viewed in a sexual selection context .

== Gynoecium ==
The gynoecium (the female organs of a flower) may also affected by sexual selection. Every part — from the ovaries, styles, stigma, and carpels — are potentially subject to sexual selection pressures. In ovule packaging, the intensity of pollen competition depends in part on the number of pollen grains relative to the number of ovules. Although many factors may contribute to determining ovule number, one way for females to increase the level of pollen competition is to decrease ovule number relative to stigma size.

The evolution of functional syncarpy (assuming no other attendant changes) presumably represents a simultaneous increase in the number of ovules accessible from one stigma, which tended to decrease the intensity of pollen competition, and a concentration of pollen deposition on a single stigma, which tends to increase pollen competition. Further increases in pollen competition could be brought about by an increase in pollen delivery (through change of pollinator, increased attractiveness of floral display, or rewards), a decrease in ovule number or stigma size, or changes in temporal patterns of stigma receptivity, or changes in the competitive environment of the carpel .

== Controversy and alternative explanations ==
Despite the widespread acceptance of sexual selection as an explanation of floral dimorphism, the question of its importance relative to other selection mechanisms has not been definitively resolved. Numerous authors have failed to find consistent evidence, or at times any evidence, of pollinator preference for larger floral display areas. For these and other reasons, a number of authors have questioned various applications of sexual selection theory in flowers and plants.

Darwin contemporary and correspondent Hermann Müller described a function for floral dimorphism under natural selection: pollinators visit larger male floral displays first, acquiring pollen before visiting smaller female floral displays, thereby promoting effective pollination. This 'sequence hypothesis' has been confirmed experimentally by other authors.
