= List of plant genera named after people (A–C) =

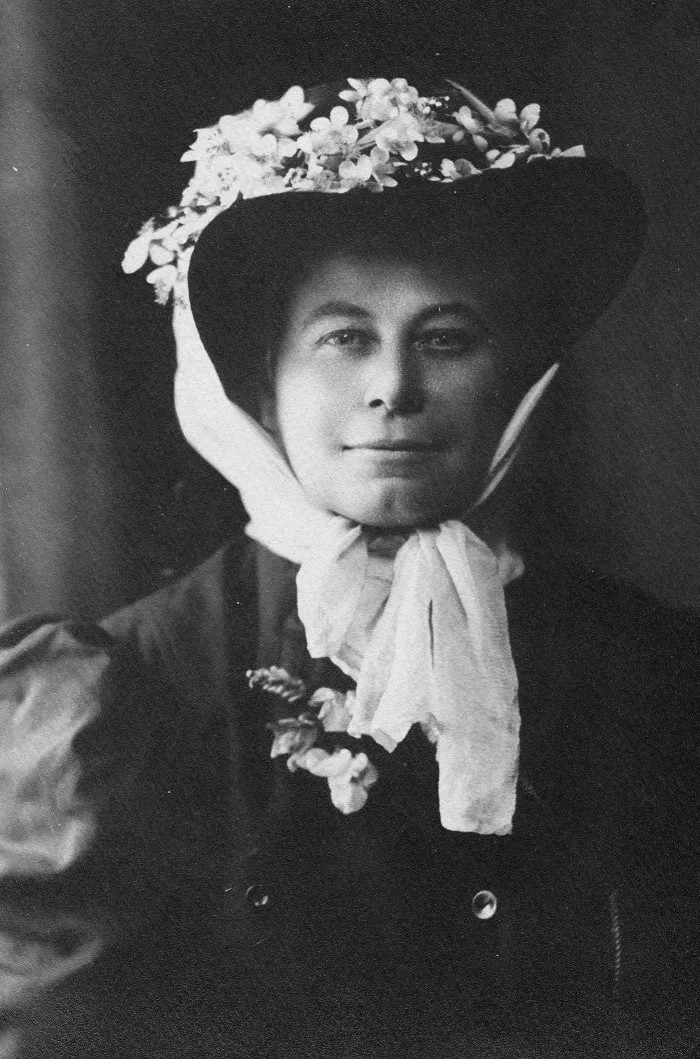
Alice Eastwood (1859–1953), curator of the botanical collection of the California Academy of Sciences (see Aliciella)

Since the first printing of Carl Linnaeus's Species Plantarum in 1753, plants have been assigned one epithet or name for their species and one name for their genus, a grouping of related species. Thousands of plants have been named after people, including botanists and their colleagues, plant collectors, horticulturists, explorers, rulers, politicians, clerics, doctors, philosophers and scientists. Even before Linnaeus, botanists such as Joseph Pitton de Tournefort, Charles Plumier and Pier Antonio Micheli were naming plants after people, sometimes in gratitude for the financial support of their patrons.

Early works researching the naming of plant genera include an 1810 glossary by Alexandre de Théis and an etymological dictionary in two editions (1853 and 1856) by Georg Christian Wittstein. Modern works include The Gardener's Botanical by Ross Bayton, Index of Eponymic Plant Names and Encyclopedia of Eponymic Plant Names by Lotte Burkhardt, Plants of the World by Maarten J. M. Christenhusz (lead author), Michael F. Fay and Mark W. Chase, The A to Z of Plant Names by Allan J. Coombes, the four-volume CRC World Dictionary of Plant Names by Umberto Quattrocchi, and Stearn's Dictionary of Plant Names for Gardeners by William T. Stearn; these supply the seed-bearing genera listed in the first column below. Excluded from this list are genus names not accepted (as of January 2021) at Plants of the World Online, which includes updates to Plants of the World (2017).

== Key ==
Ba = listed in Bayton's The Gardener's Botanical
Bt = listed in Burkhardt's Encyclopedia of Eponymic Plant Names
Bu = listed in Burkhardt's Index of Eponymic Plant Names
Ch = listed in Christenhusz's Plants of the World
Co = listed in Coombes's The A to Z of Plant Names
Qu = listed in Quattrocchi's CRC World Dictionary of Plant Names
St = listed in Stearn's Dictionary of Plant Names for Gardeners

In addition, Burkhardt's Index is used as a reference for every row in the table not cited to Stearn.

== Genera ==
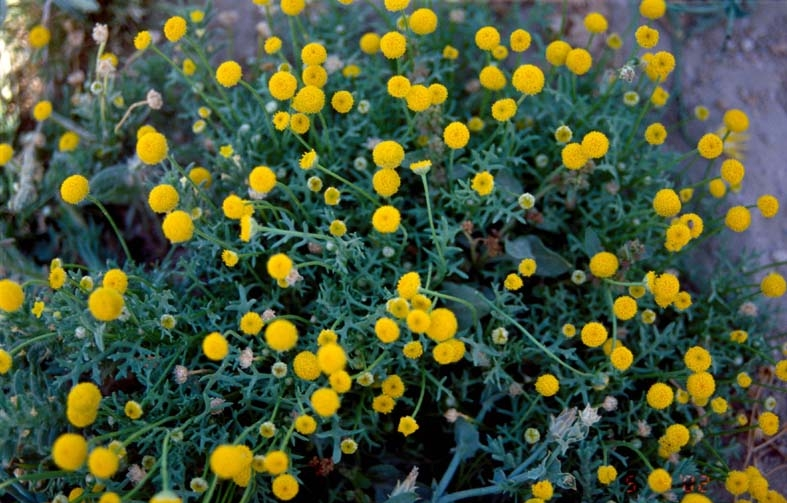
Aaronsohnia

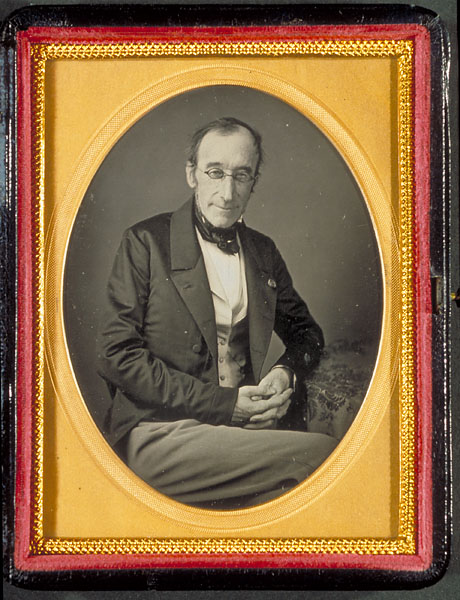
Daguerreotype of Adrien-Henri de Jussieu

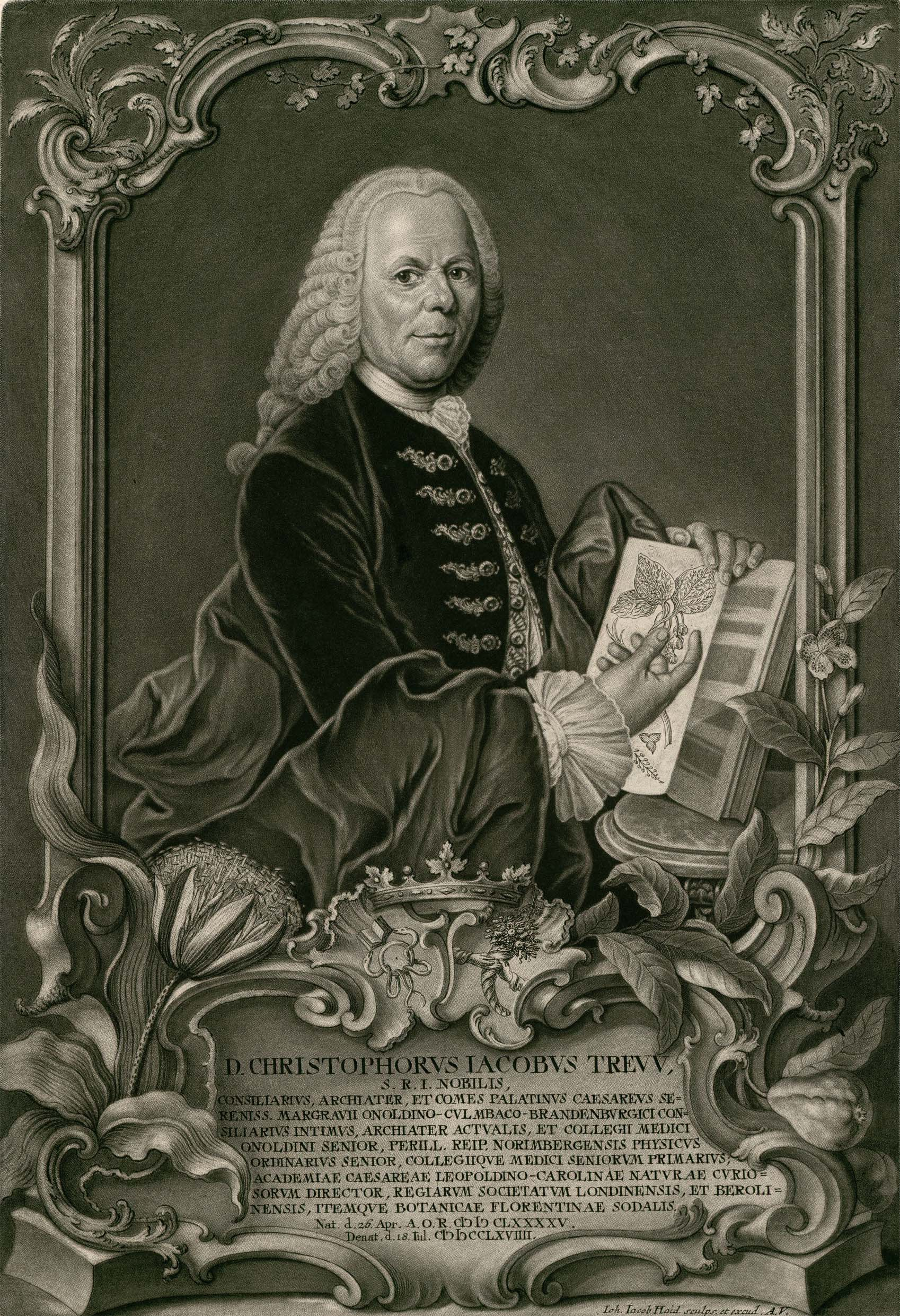
Portrait of Christoph Jacob Trew

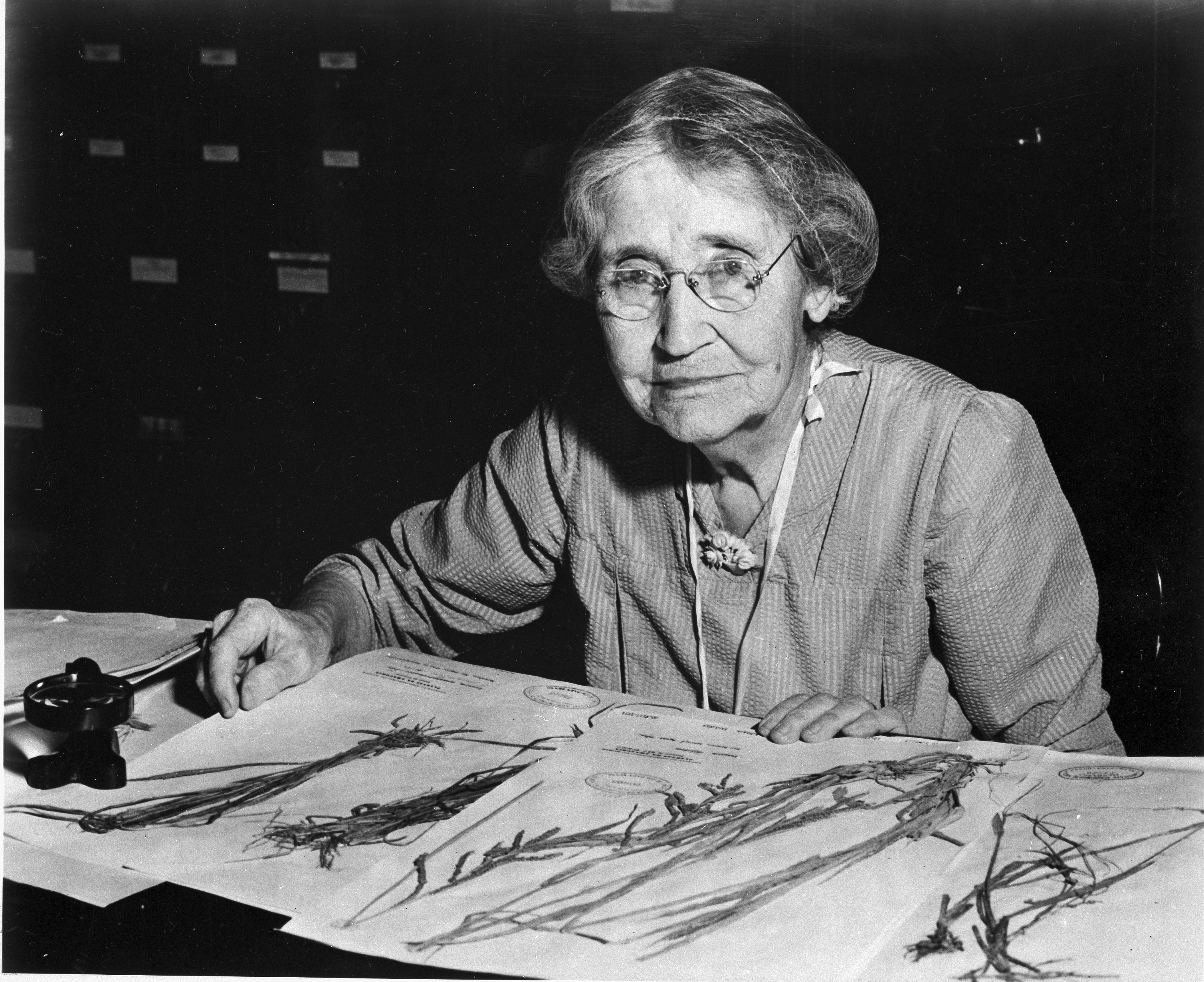
Mary Agnes Chase, sitting at desk with specimens

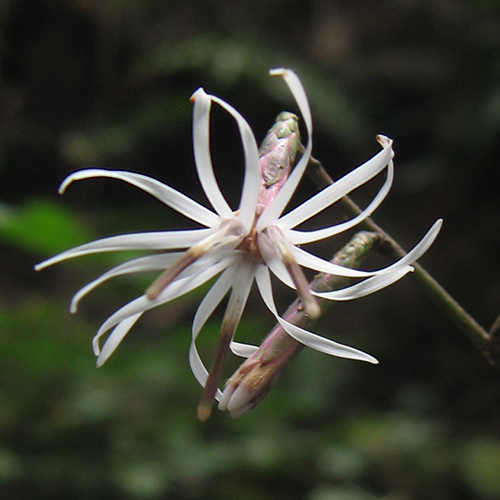
Ainsliaea cordifolia

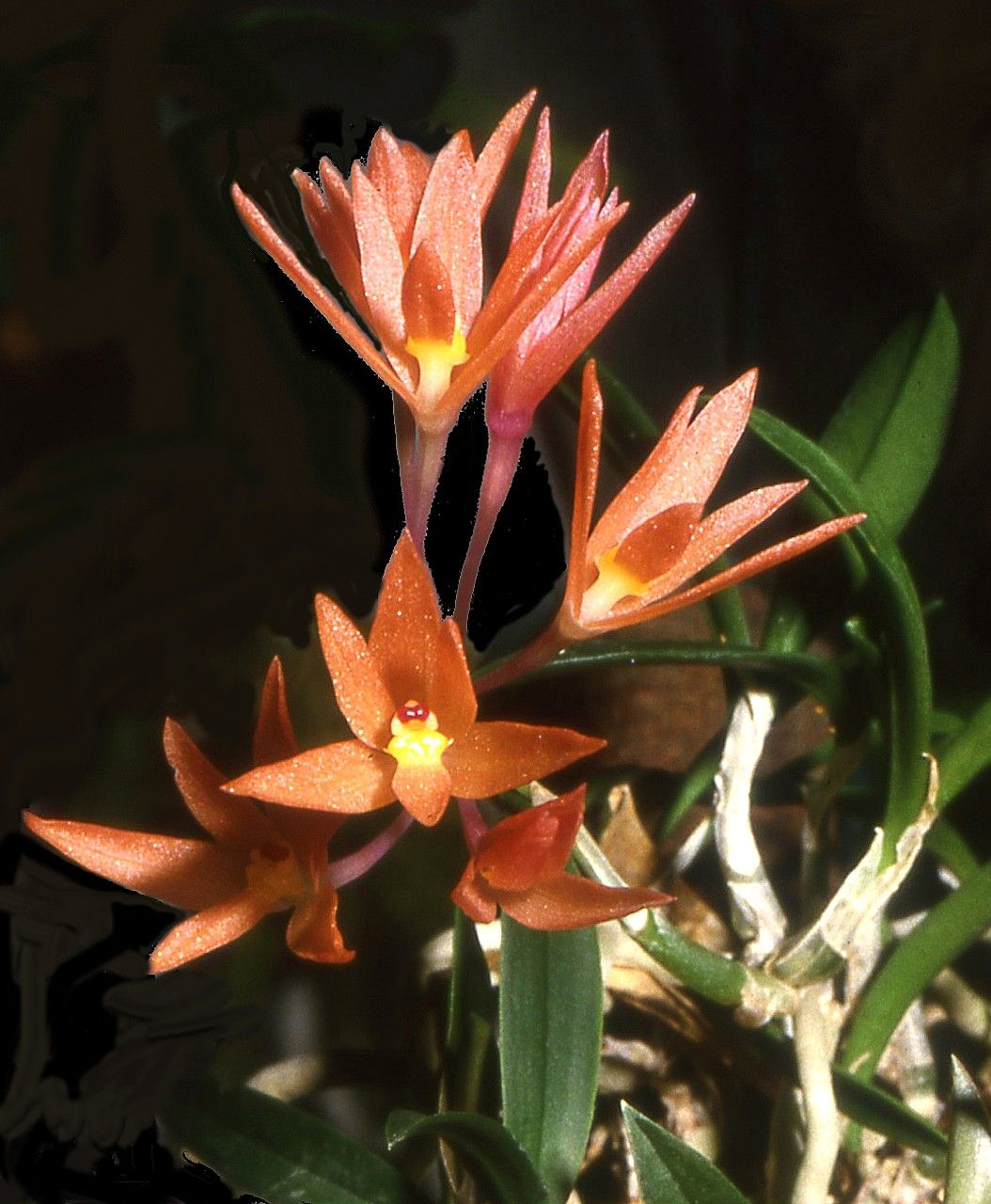
Alamania punicea

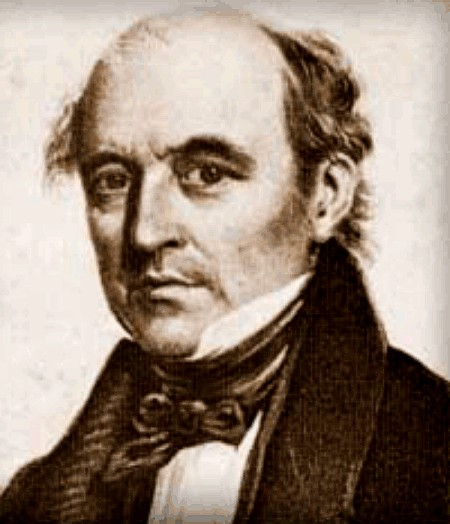
Allan Cunningham

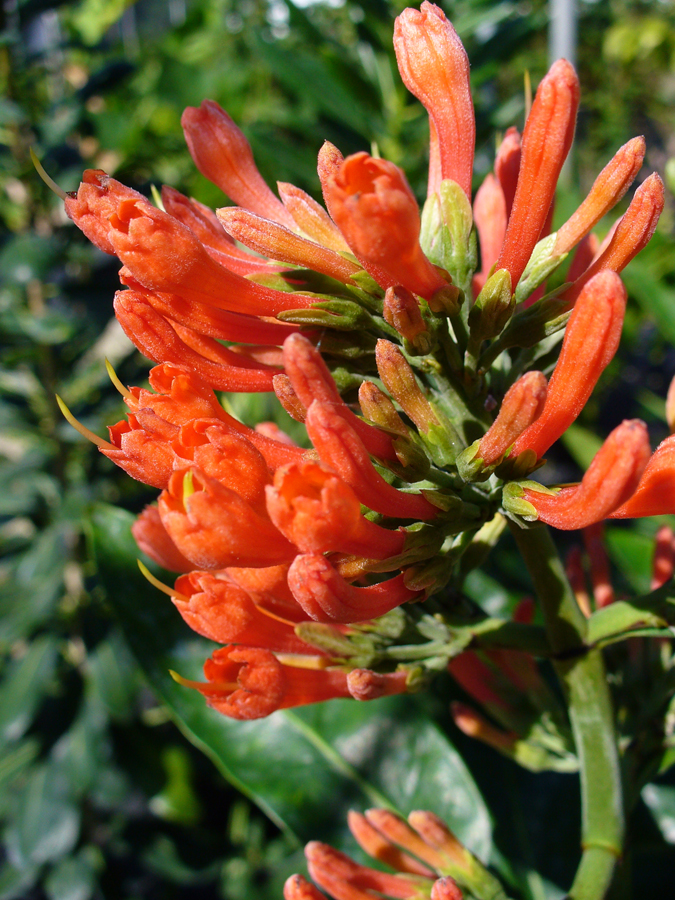
Alberta magna

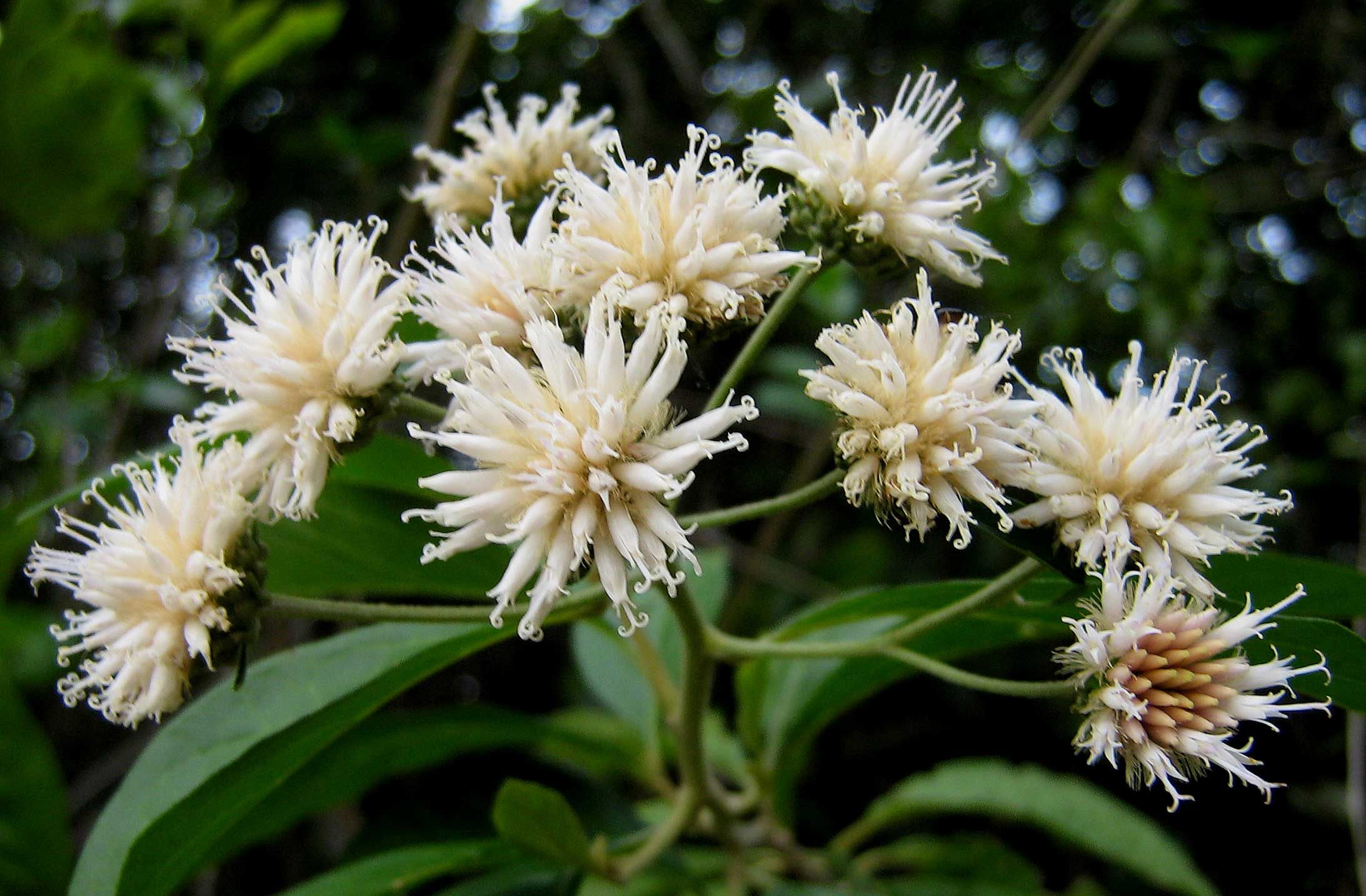
Albertinia brasiliensis

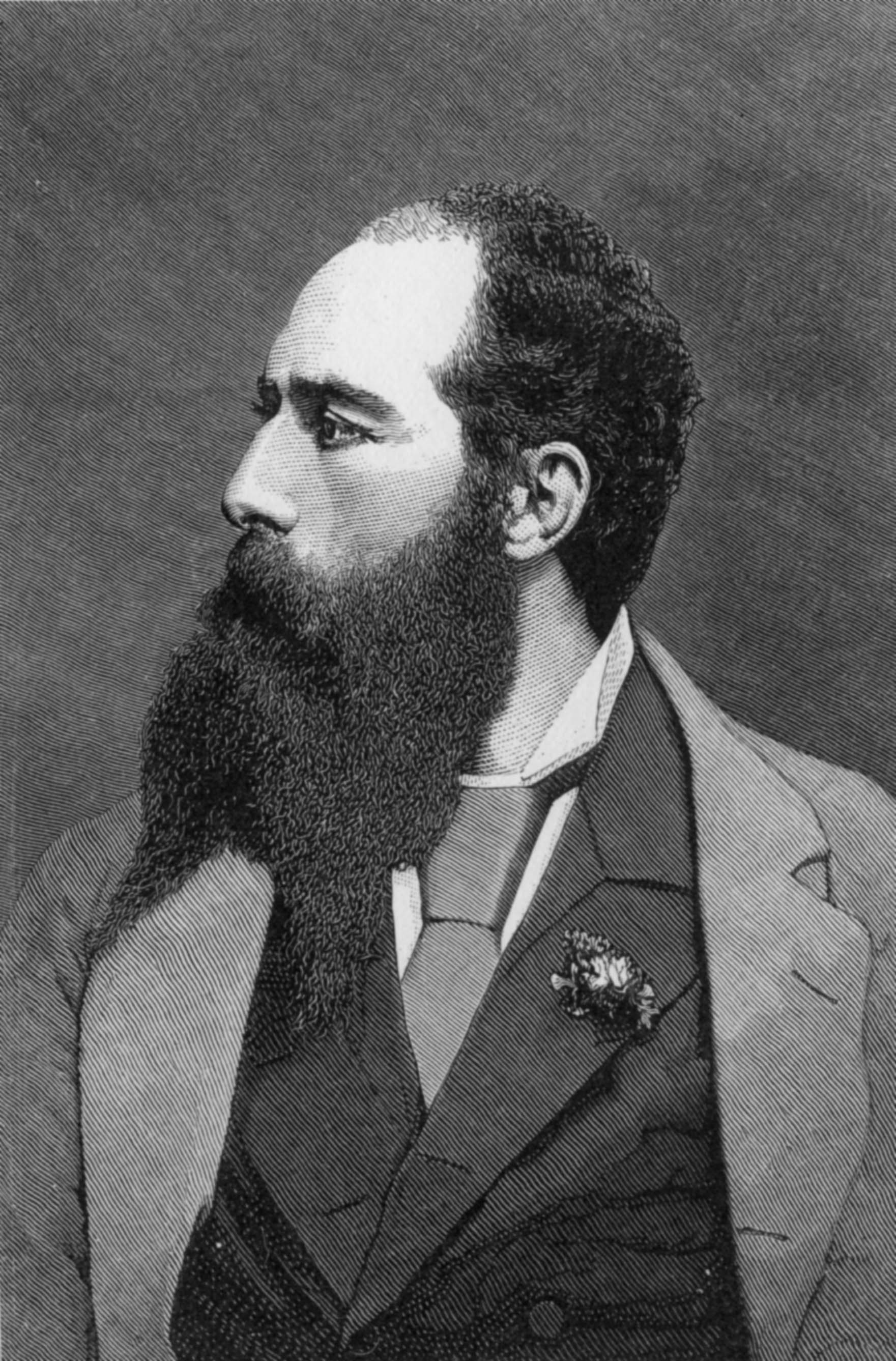
Luigi D'Albertis

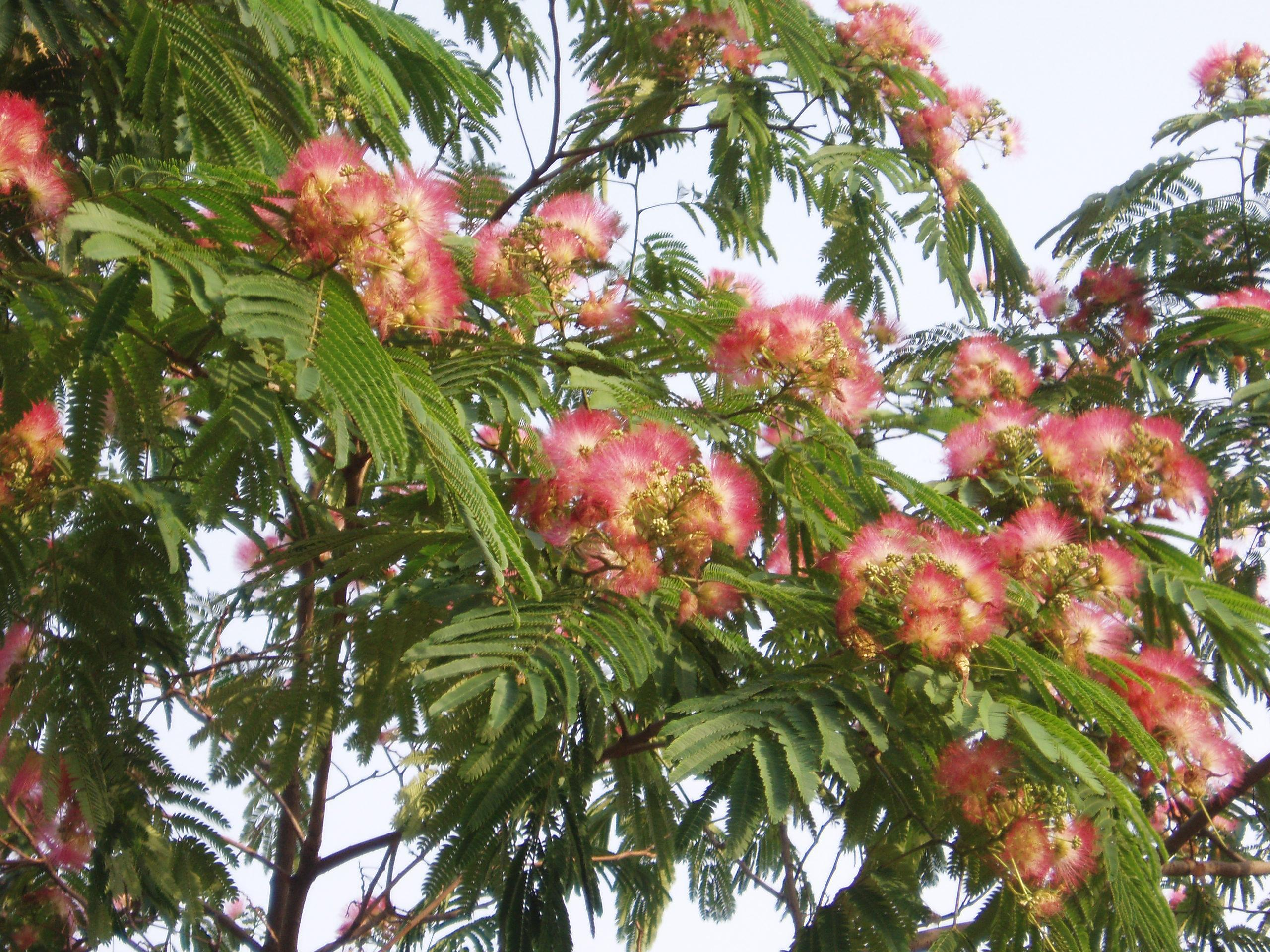
Albizia julibrissin

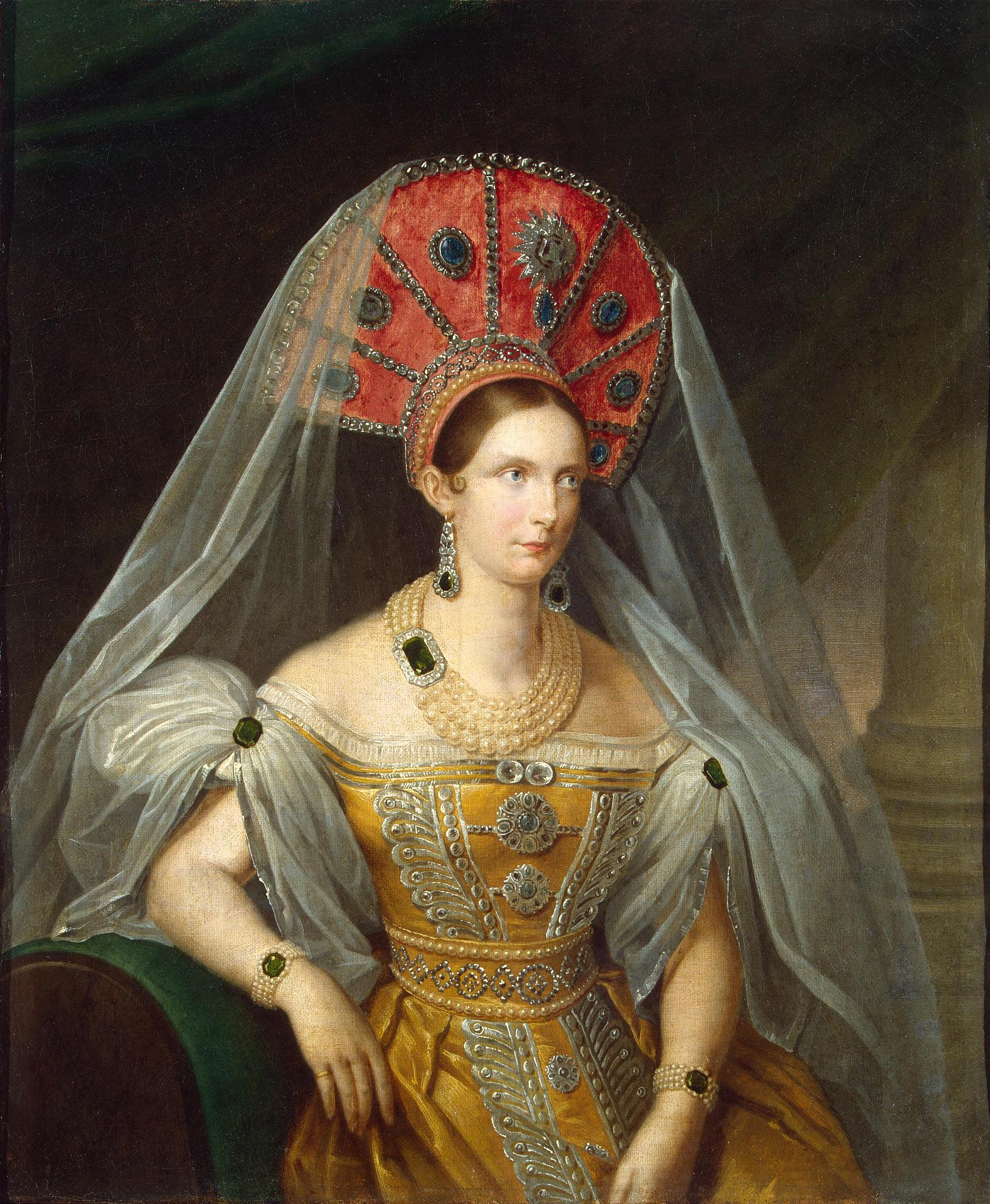
Alexandra Feodorovna (Charlotte of Prussia)

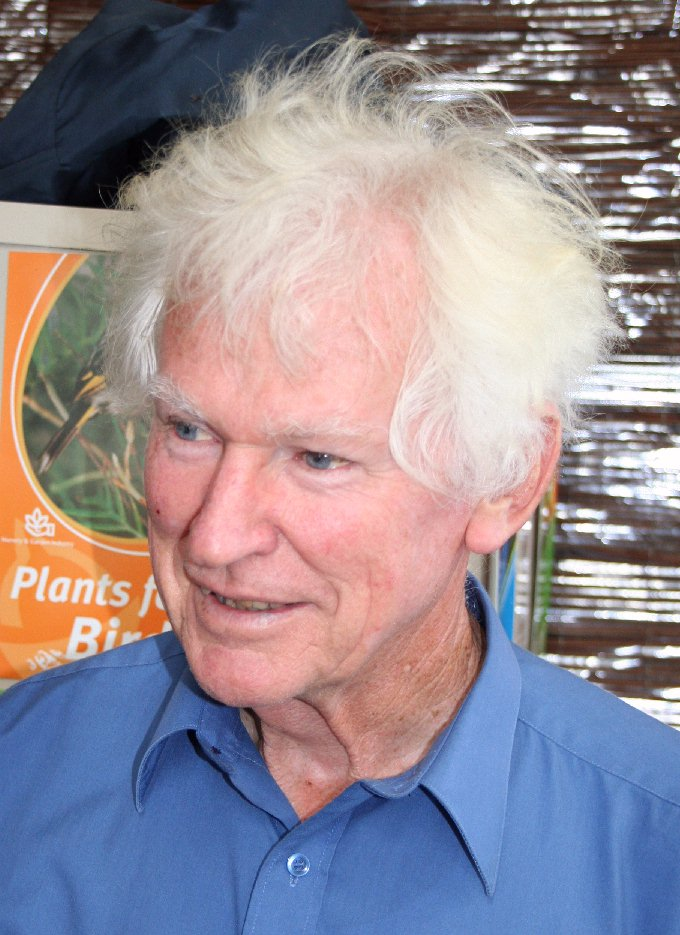
Alex George

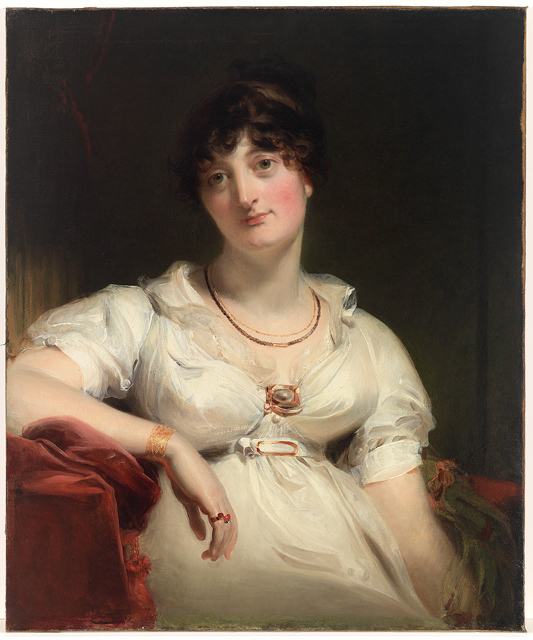
Sarah Amherst

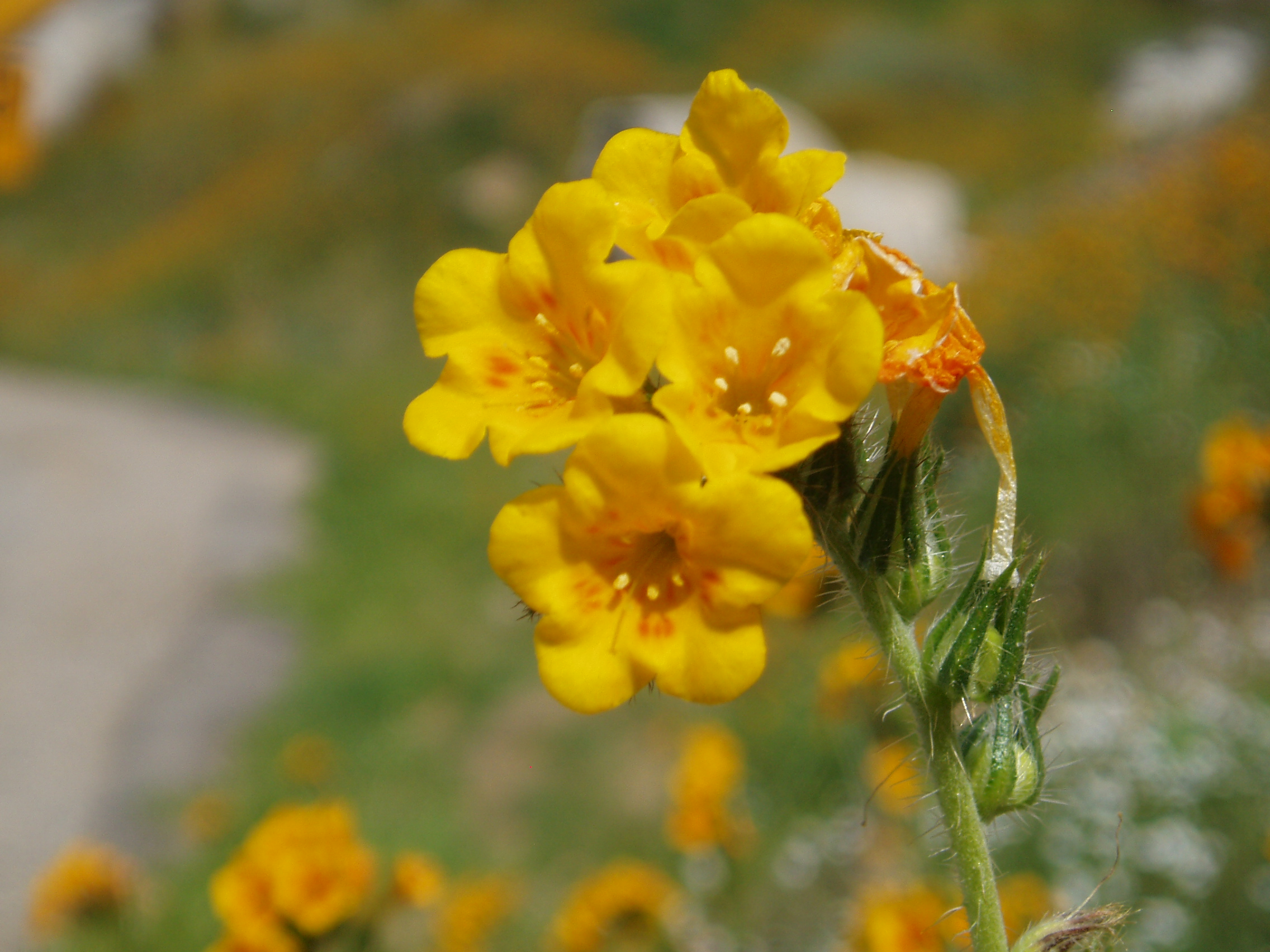
Amsinckia eastwoodiae

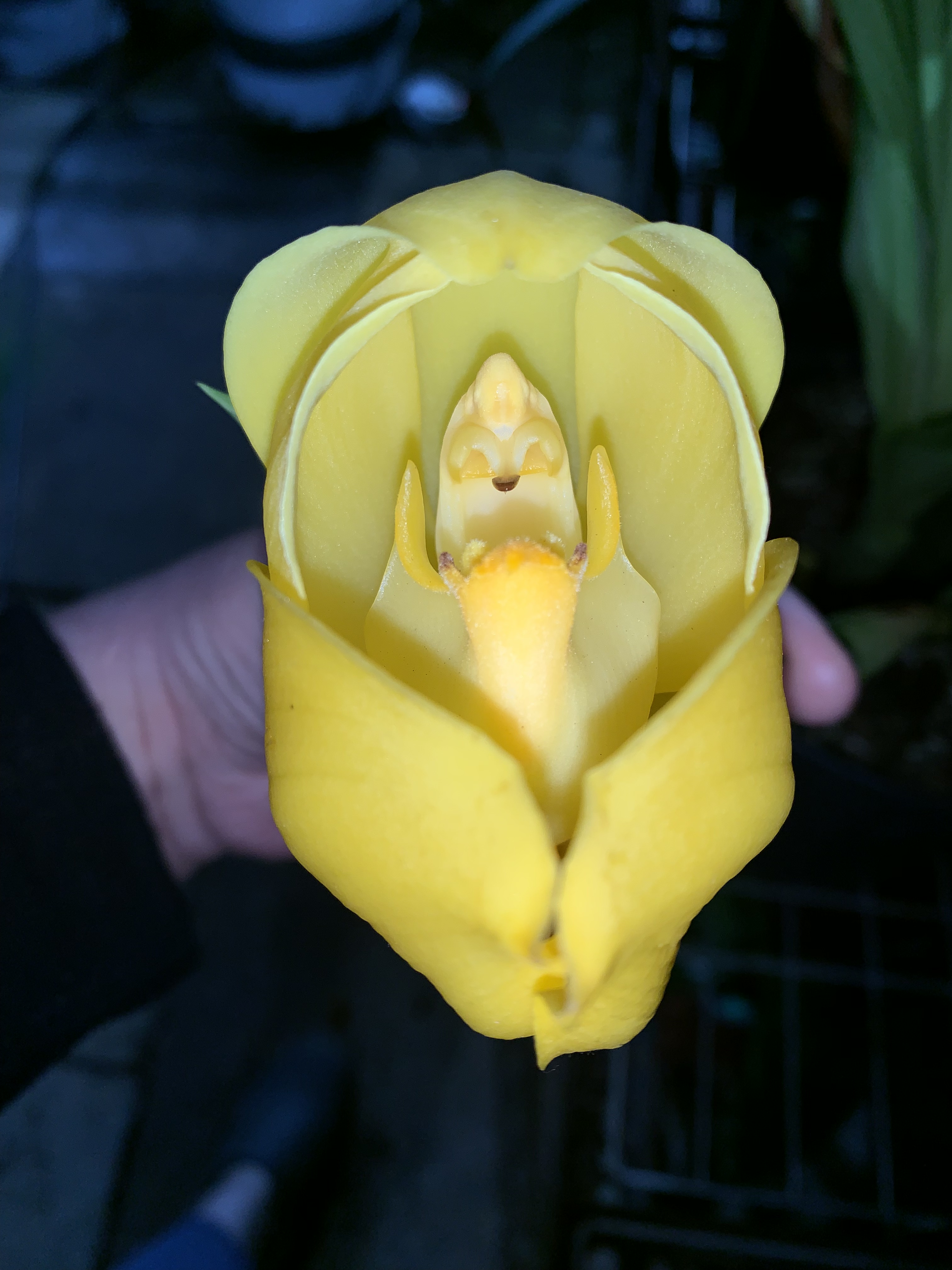
Anguloa clowesii

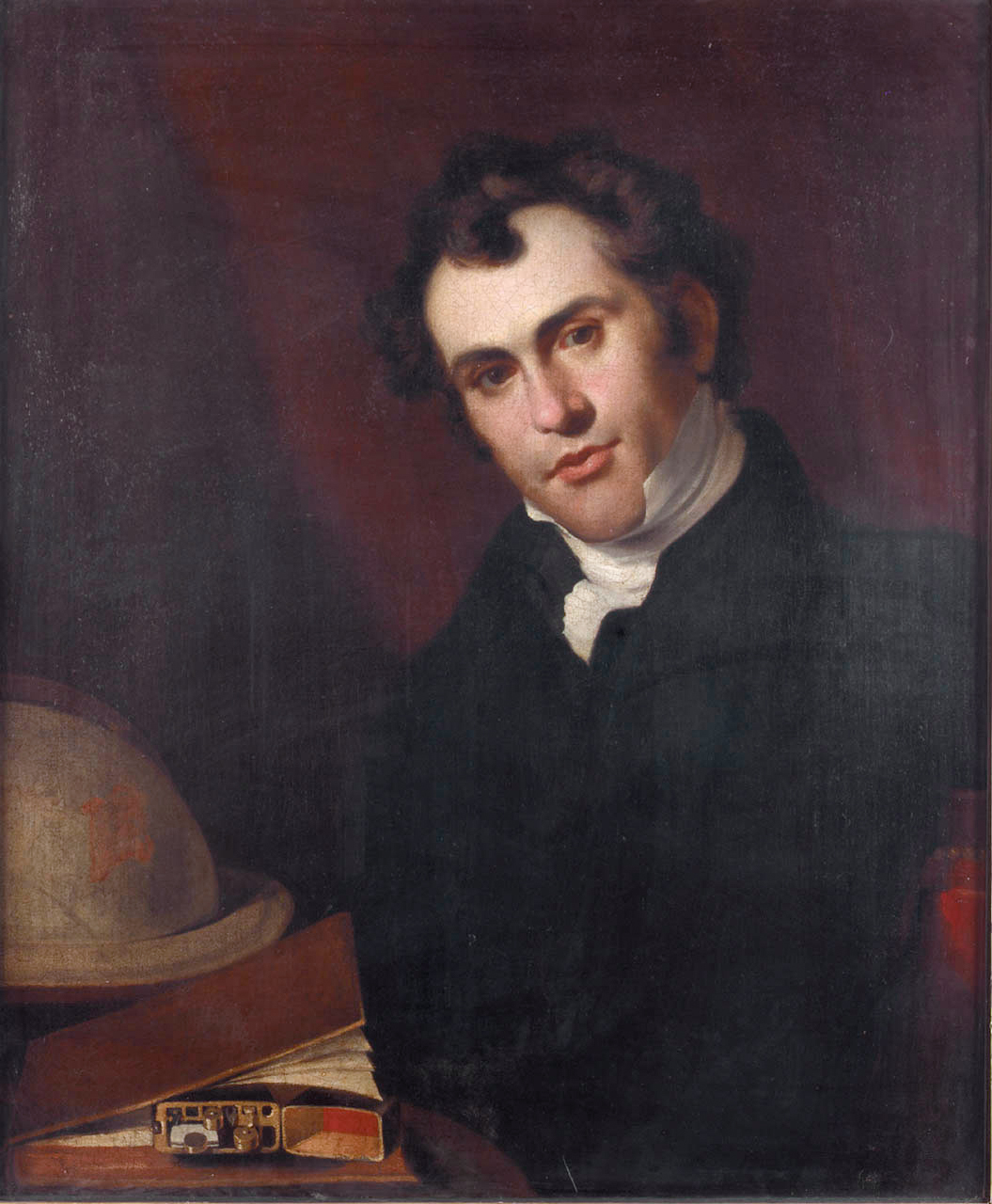
John Arrowsmith

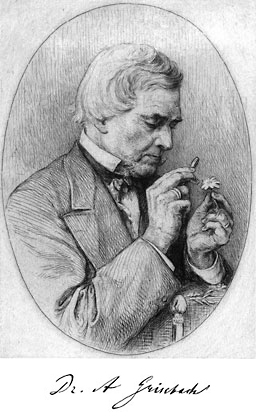
August Grisebach

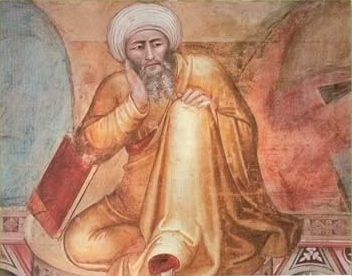
Averroes in a 14th-century painting by Andrea di Bonaiuto

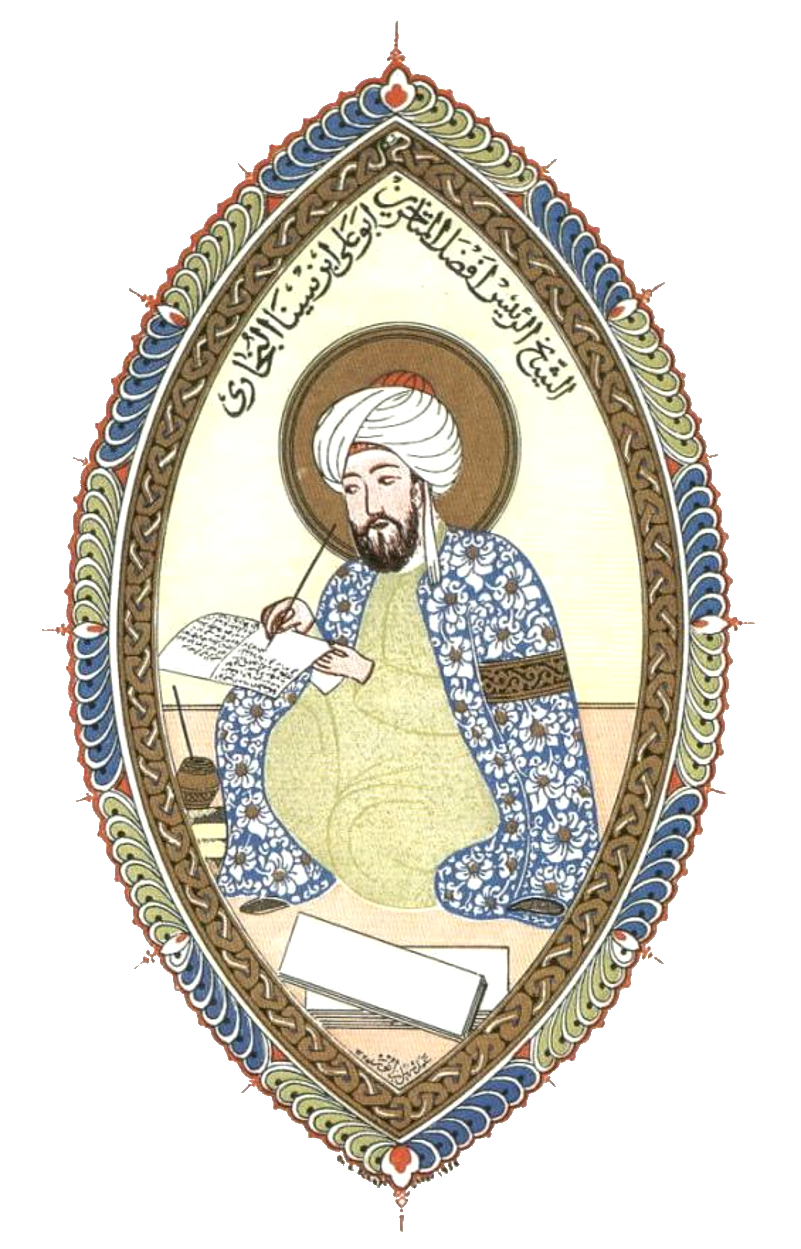
Avicenna

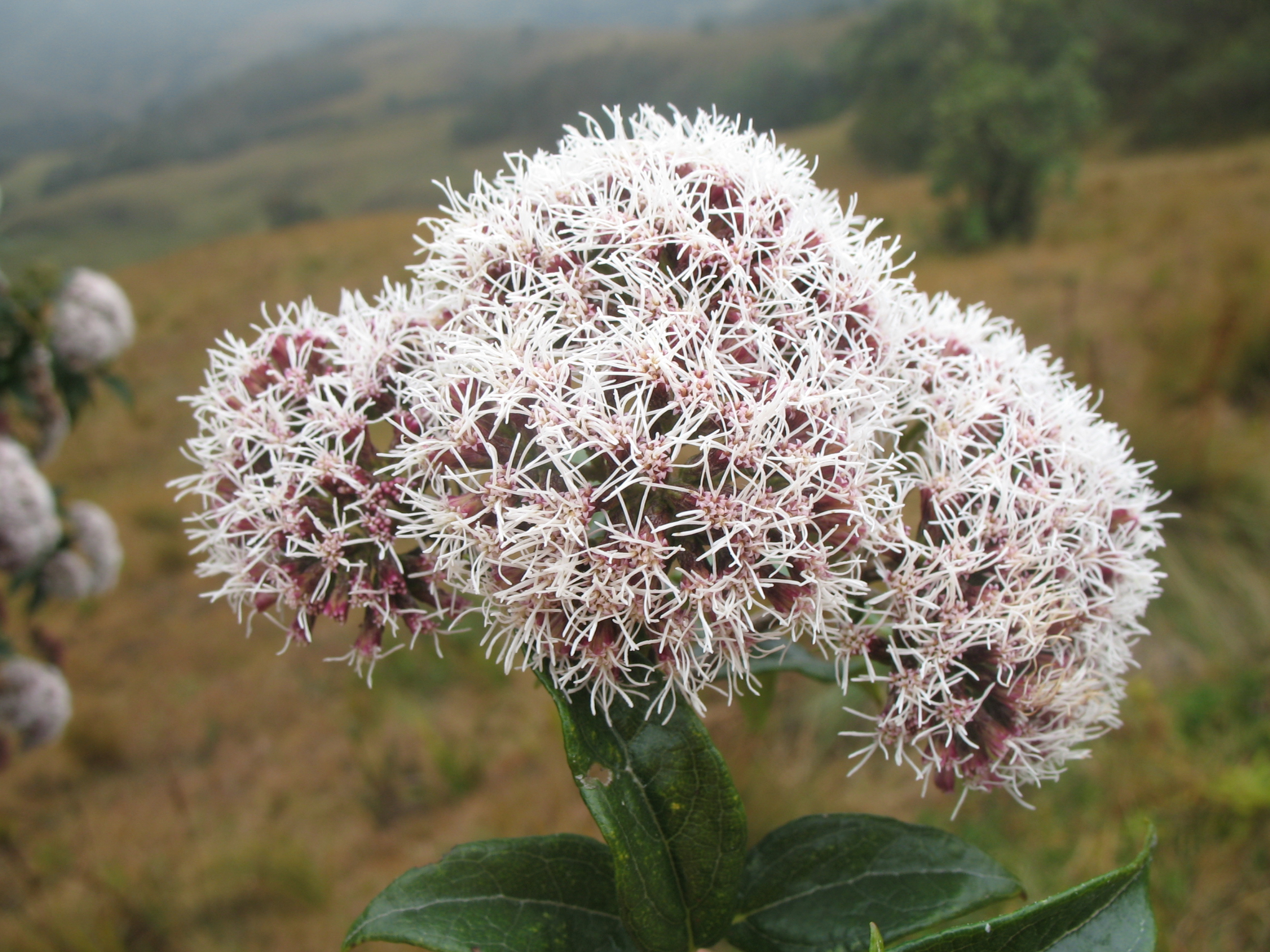
Badilloa

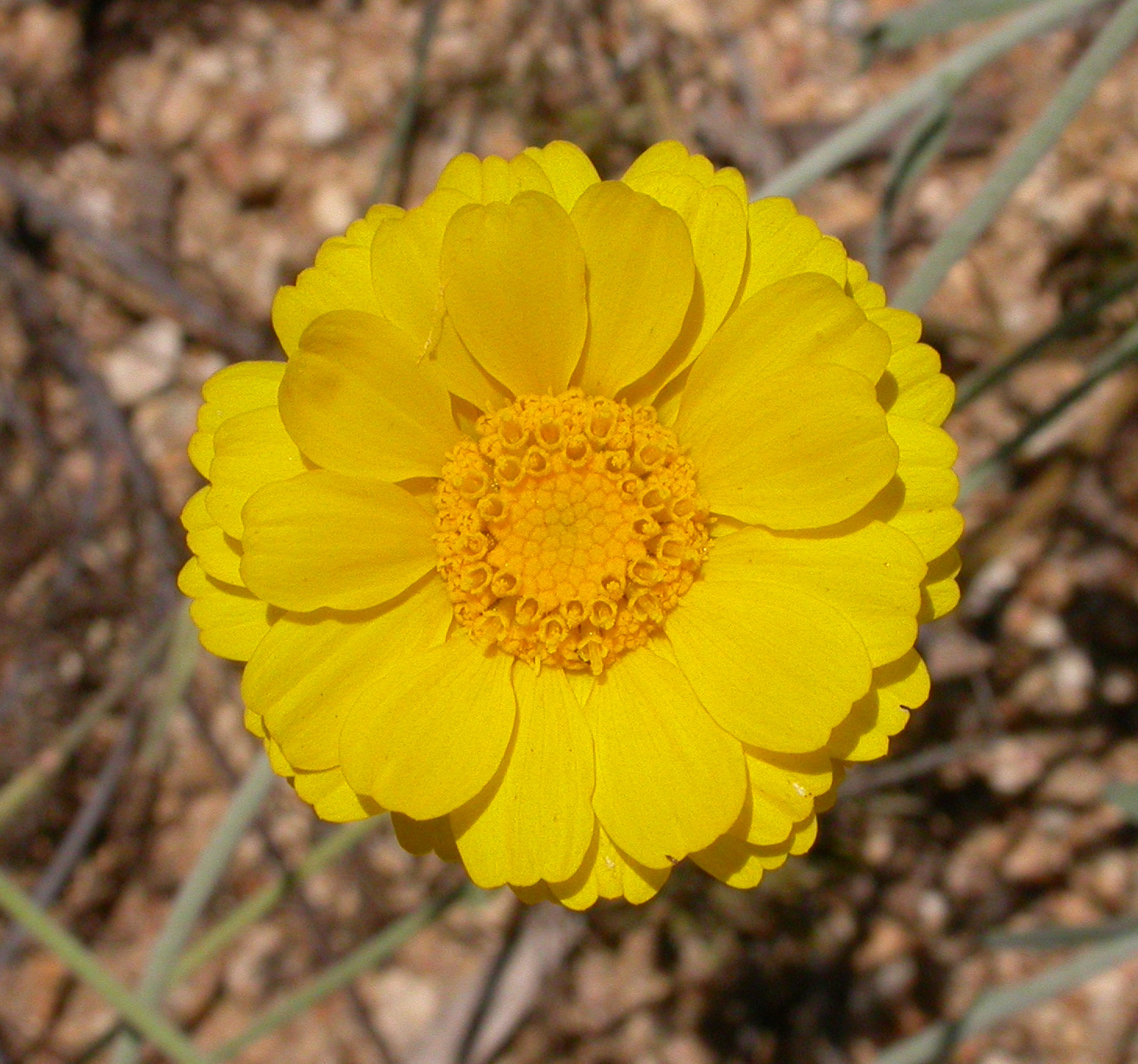
Baileya multiradiata

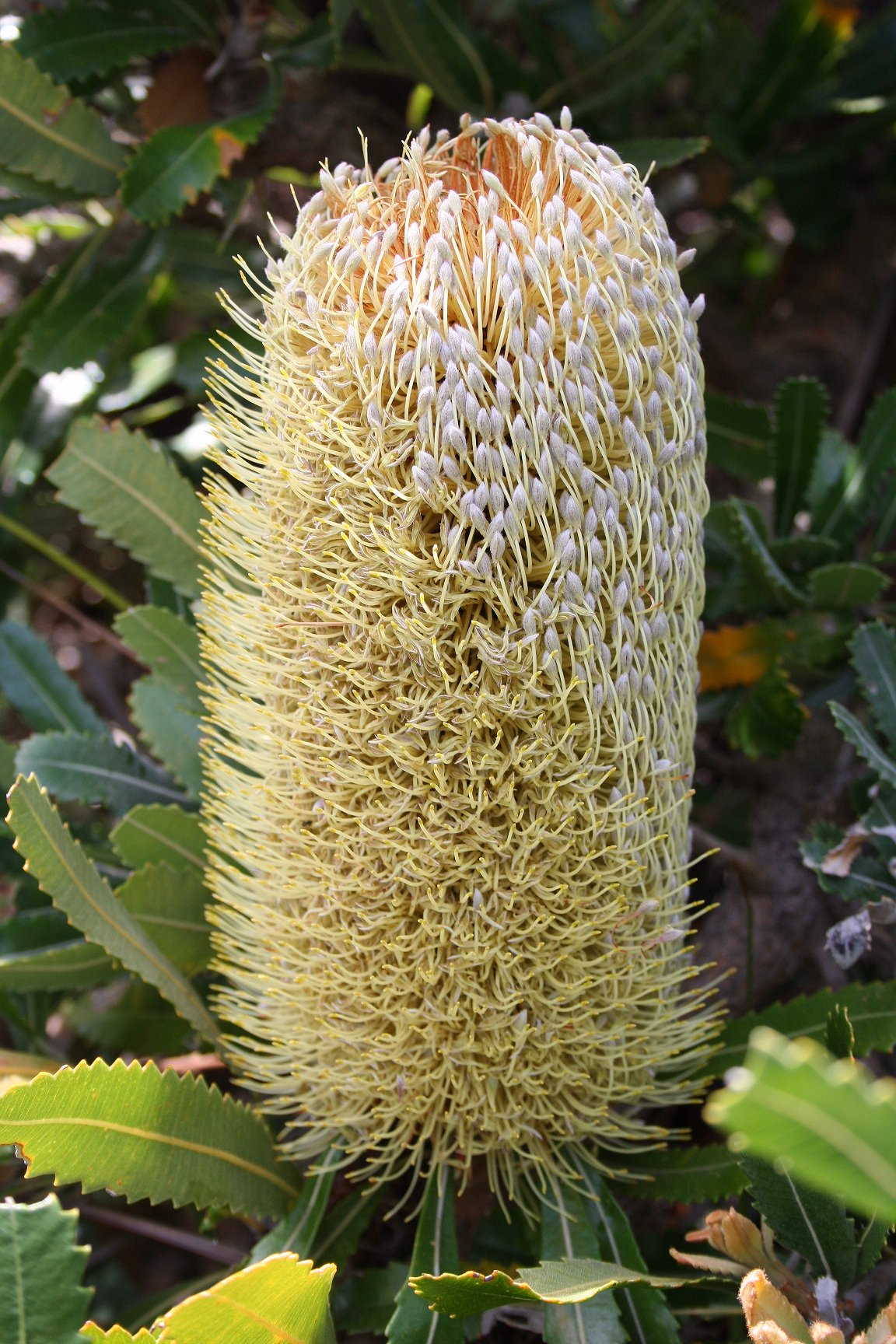
Banksia serrata

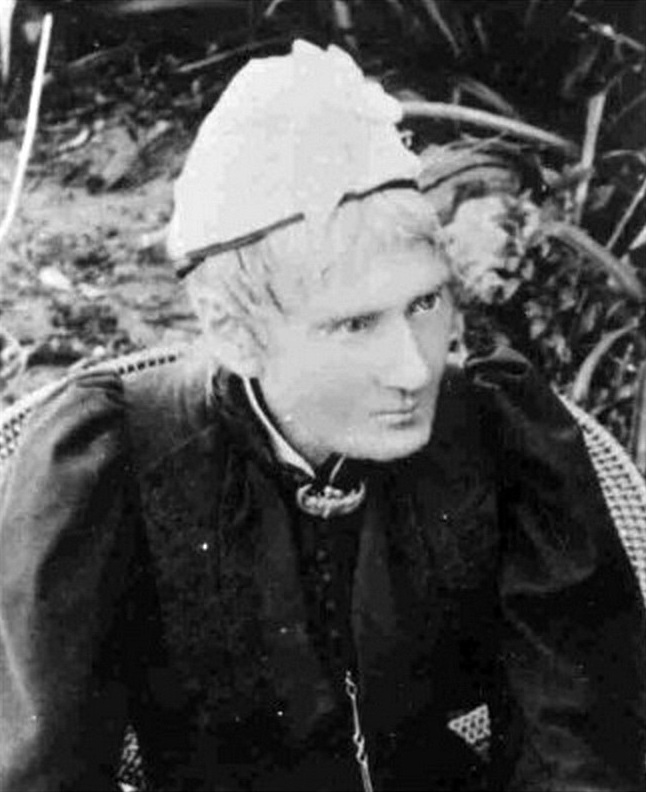
Mary Elizabeth Barber

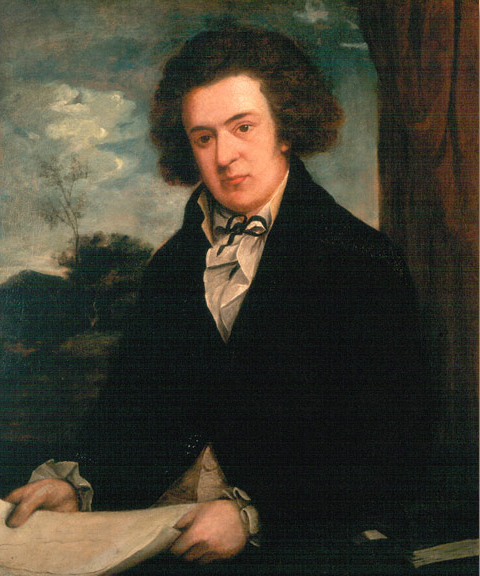
Benjamin Smith Barton

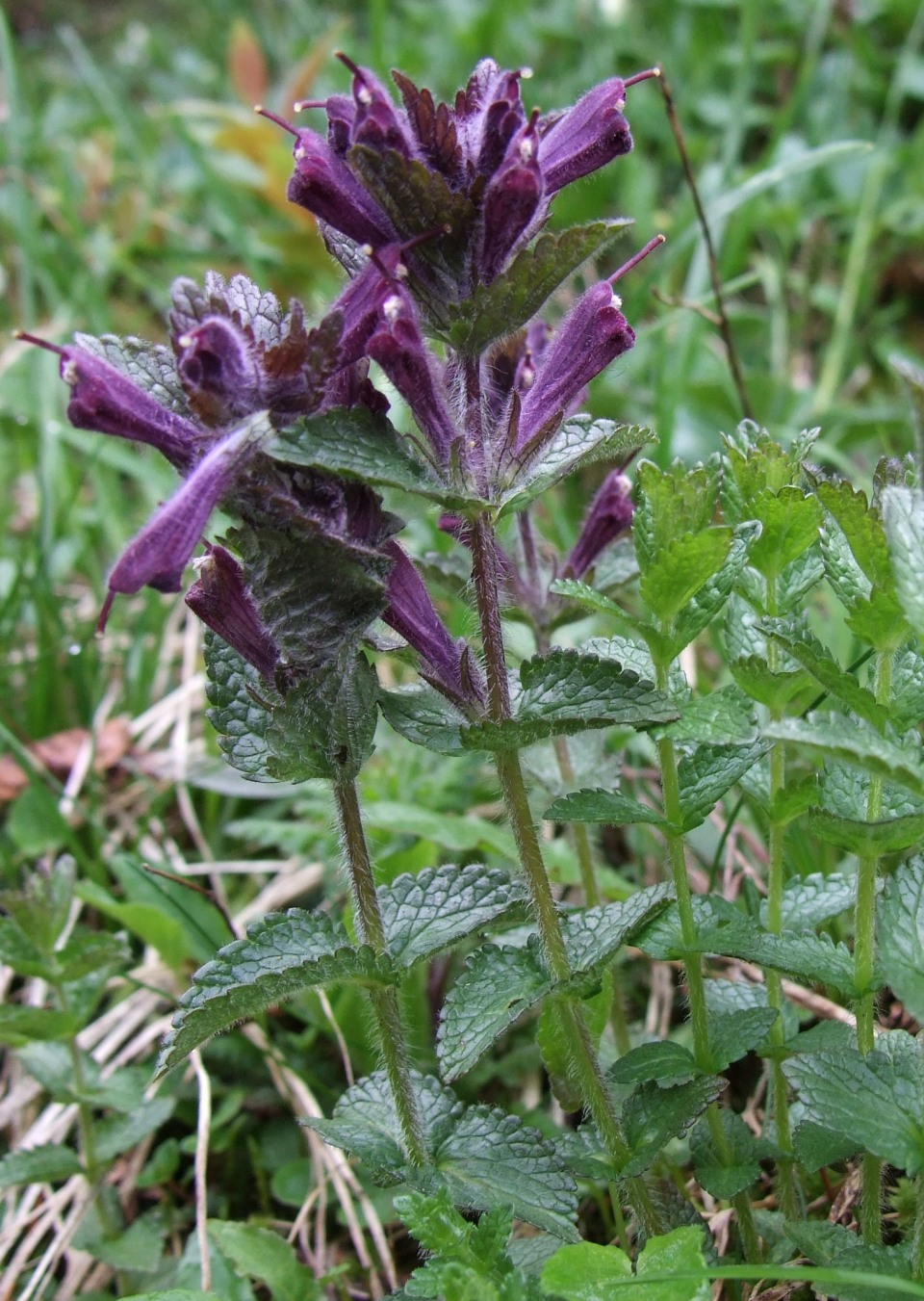
Bartsia alpina

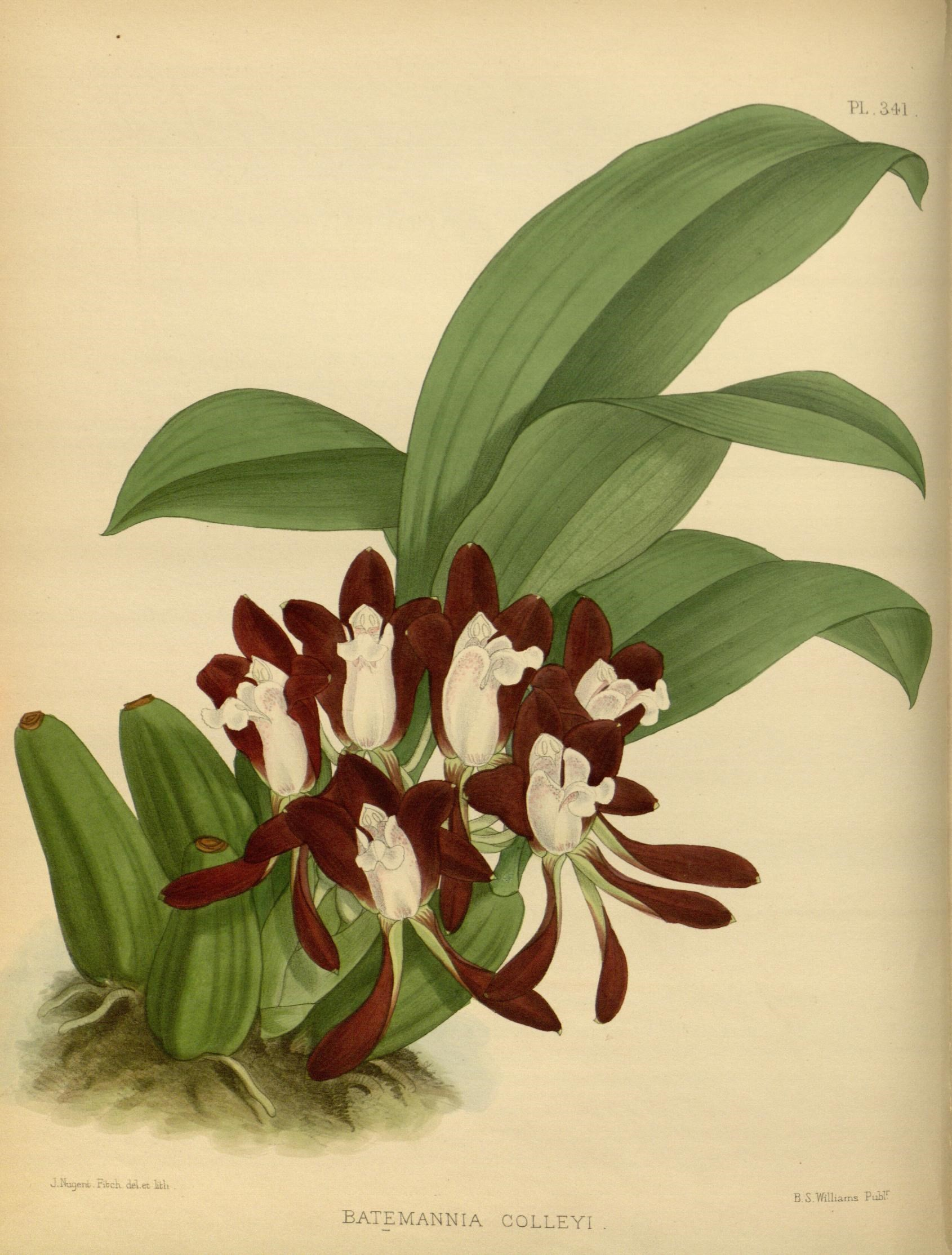
Batemannia

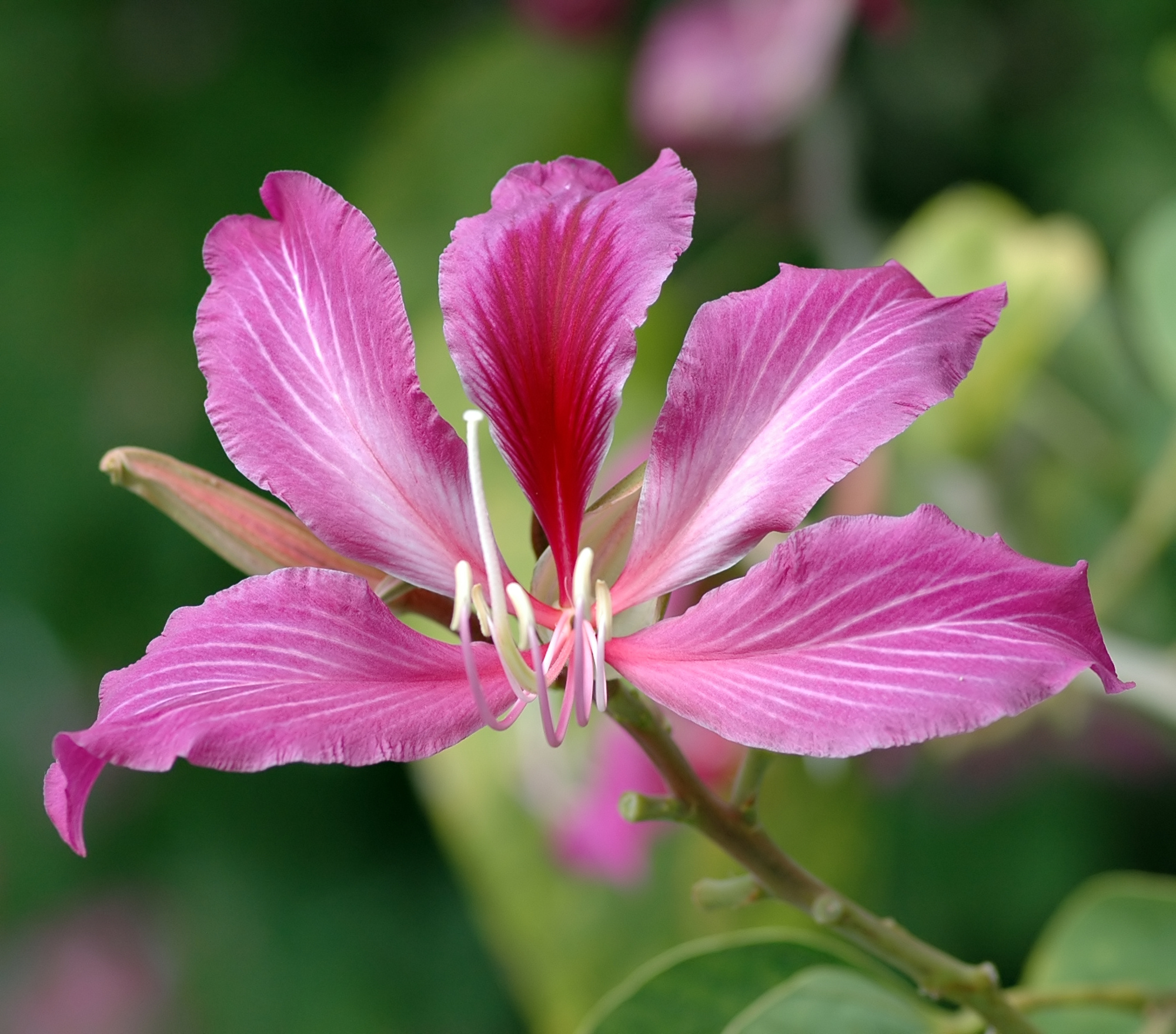
Bauhinia blakeana

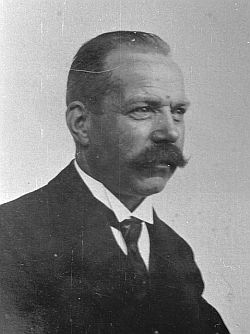
Hugo Baum

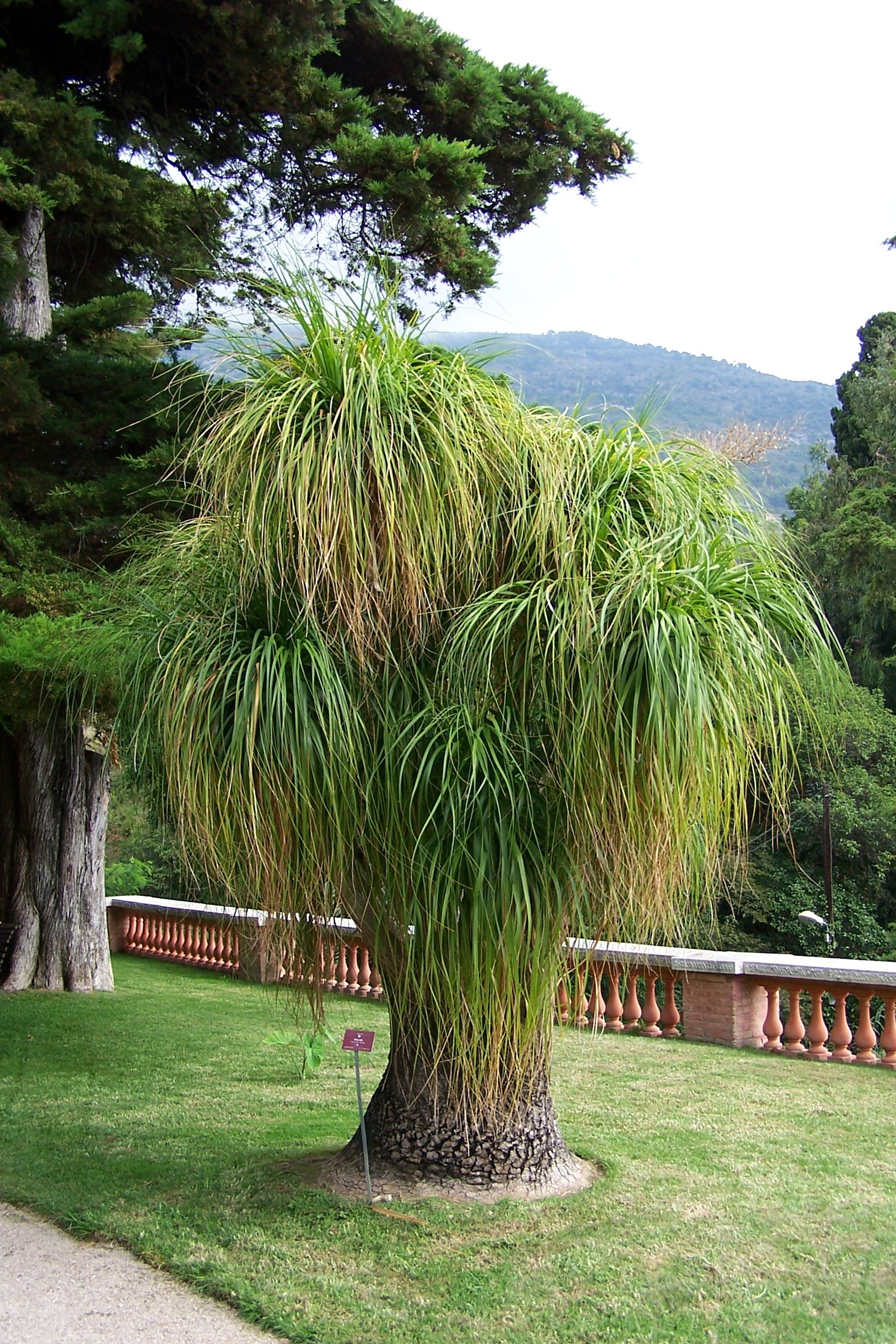
Beaucarnea

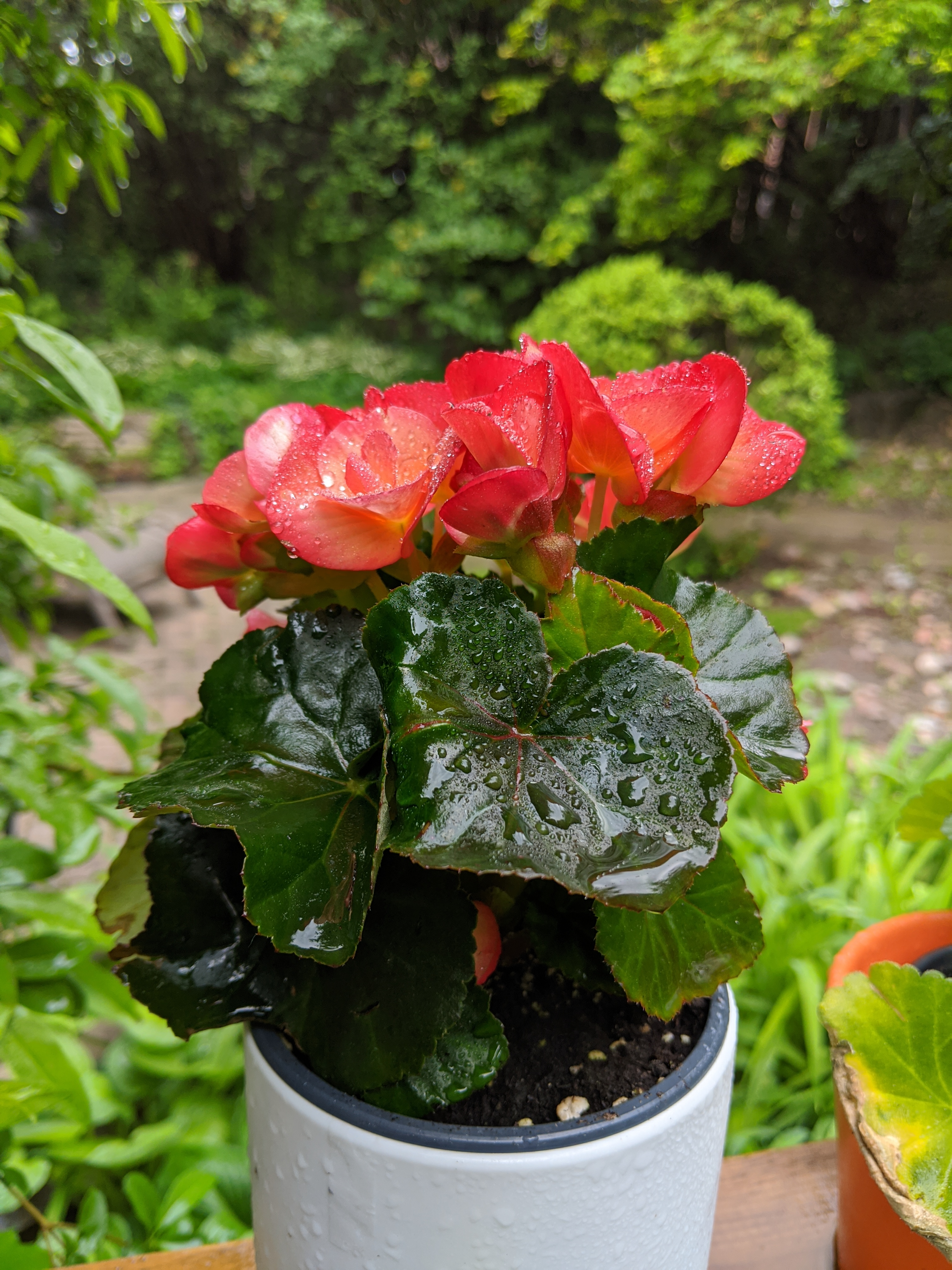
Begonia

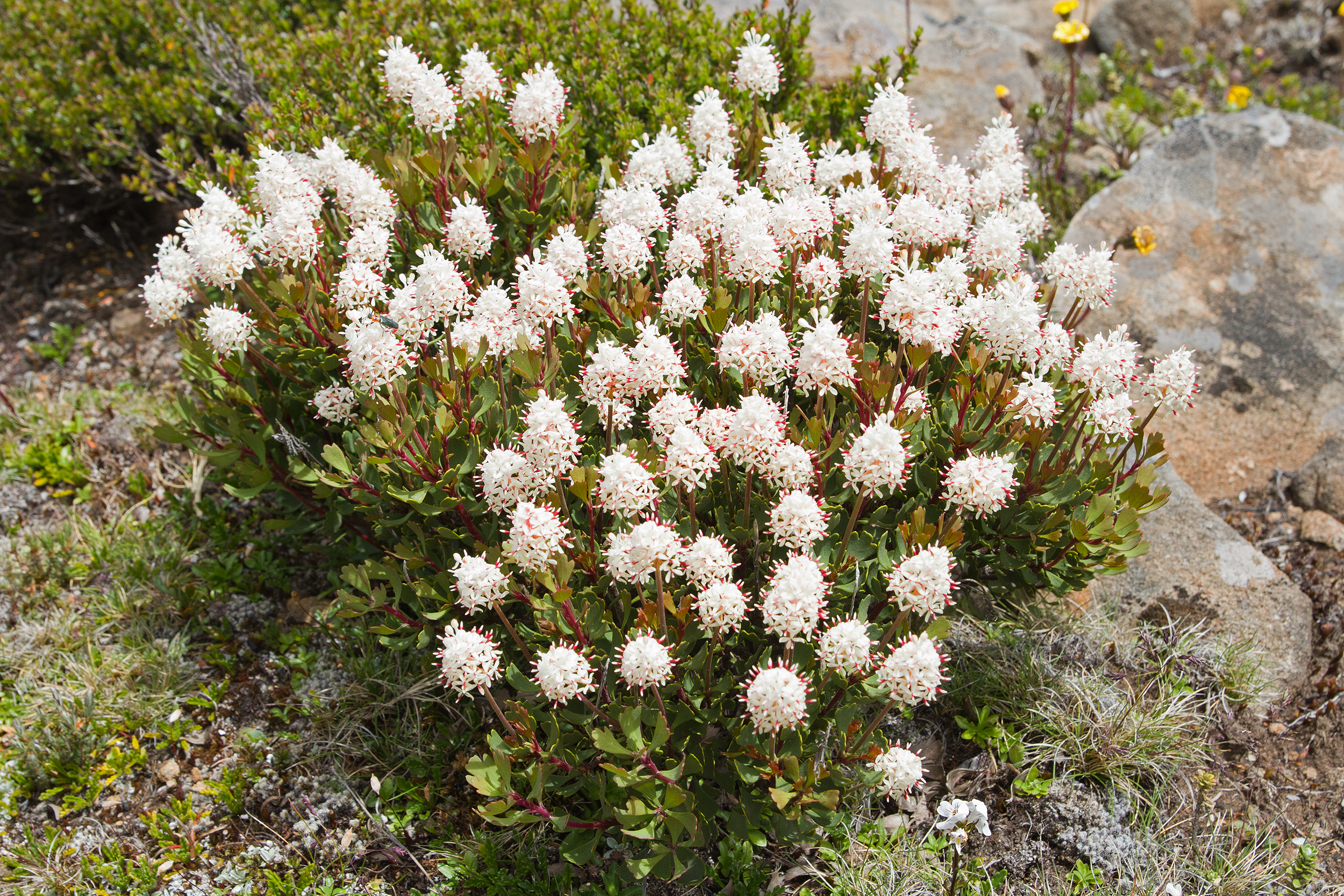
Bellendena montana

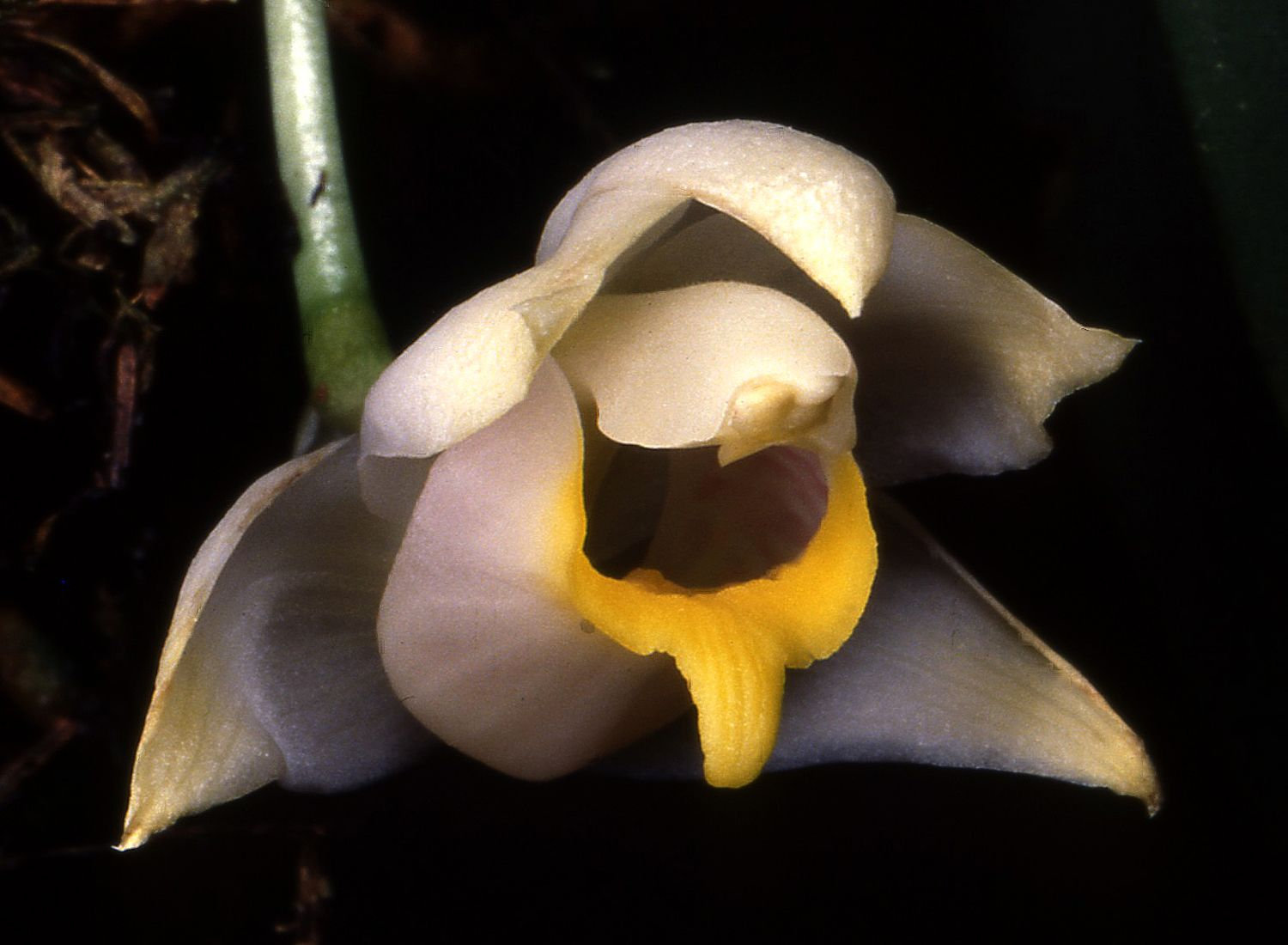
Benzingia

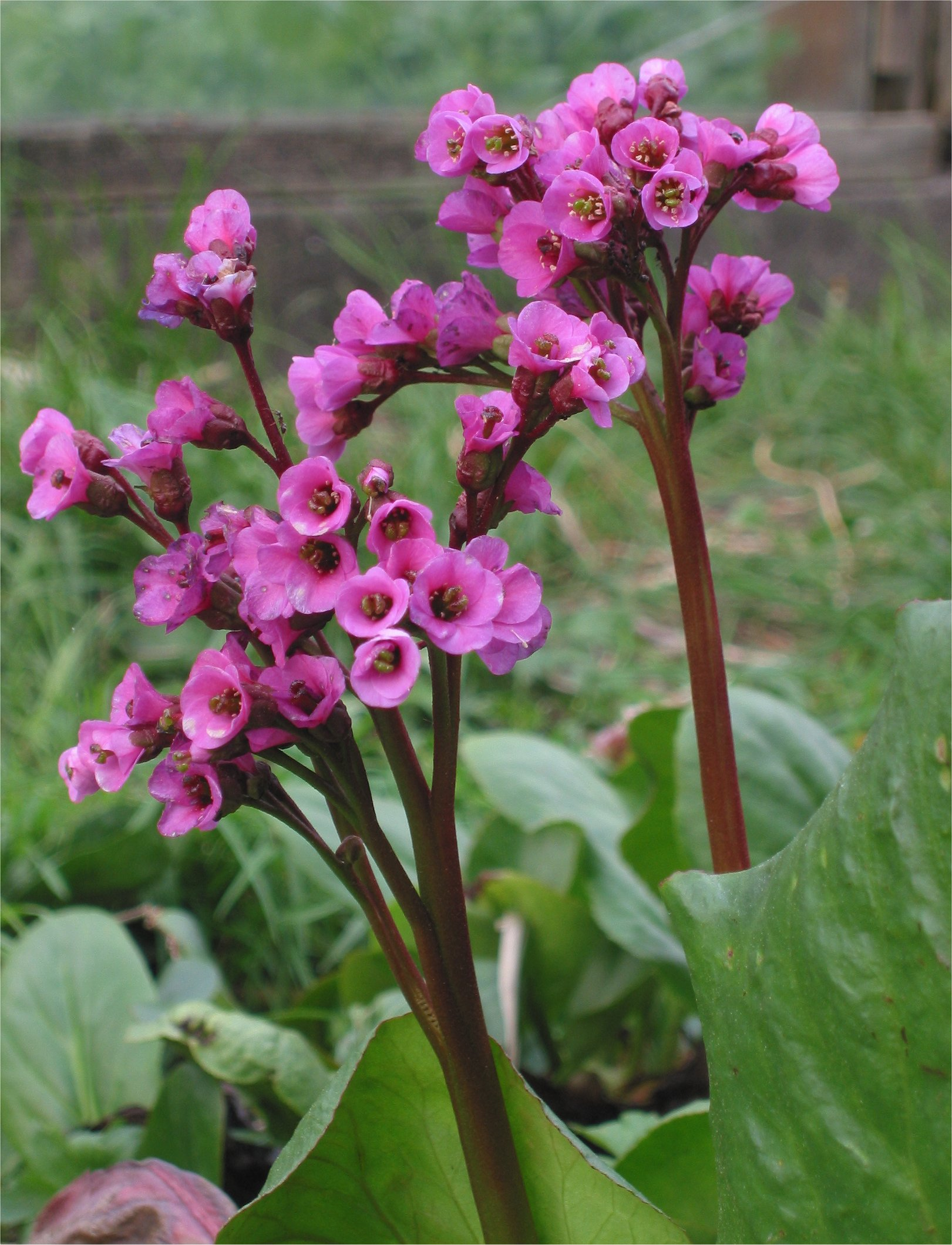
Bergenia crassifolia

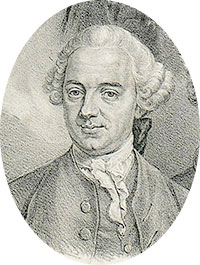
Peter Jonas Bergius

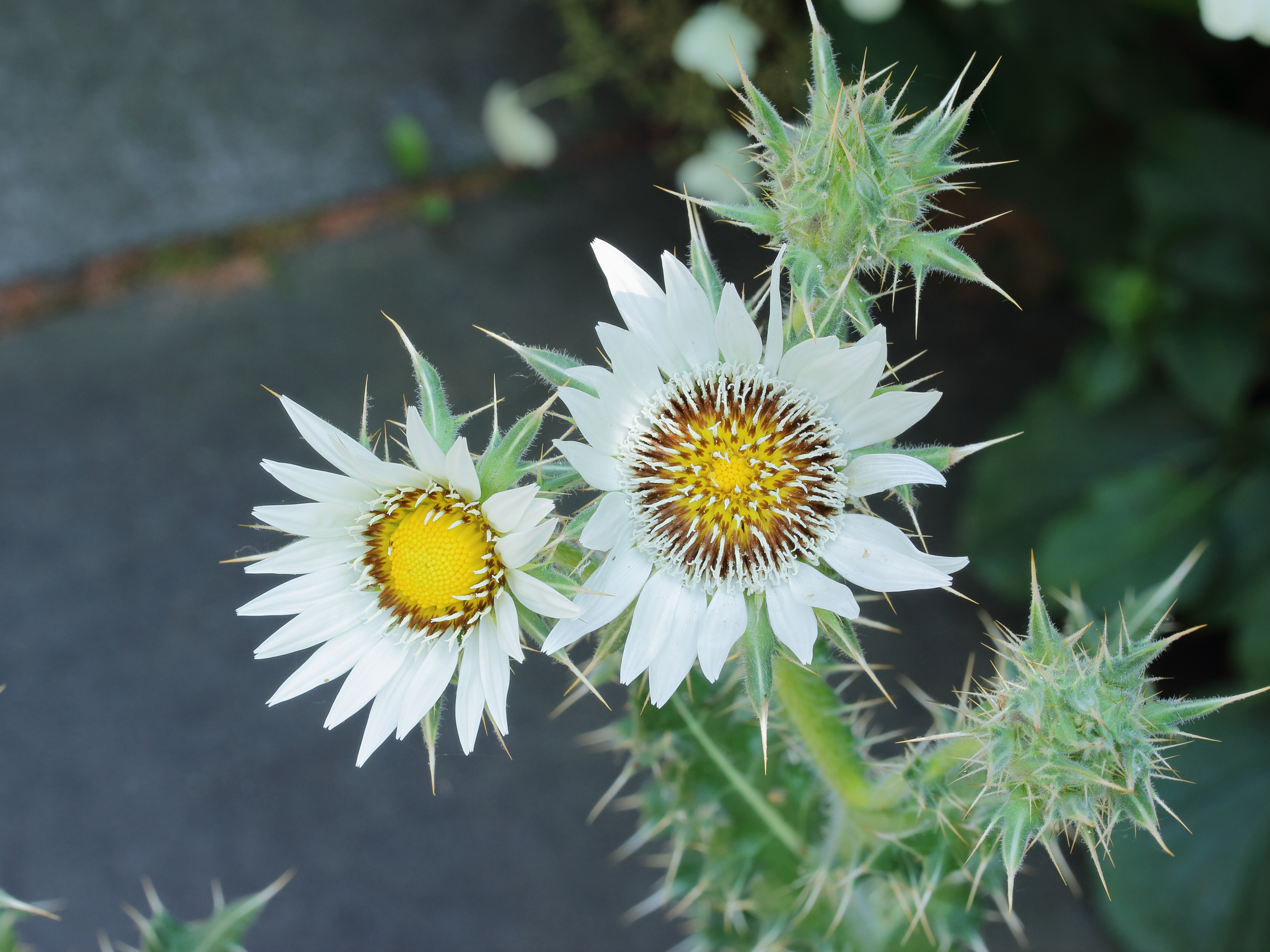
Berkheya

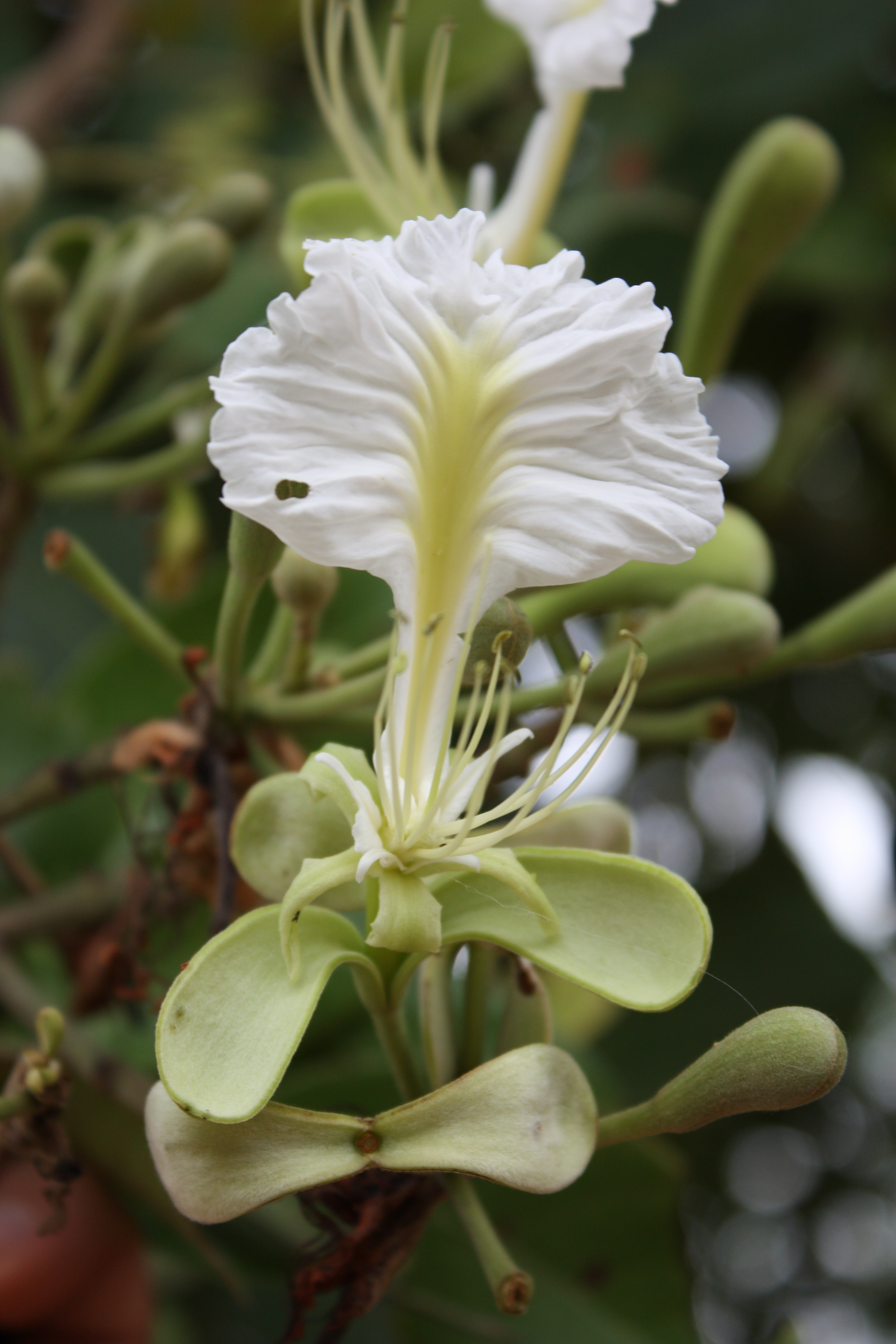
Berlinia

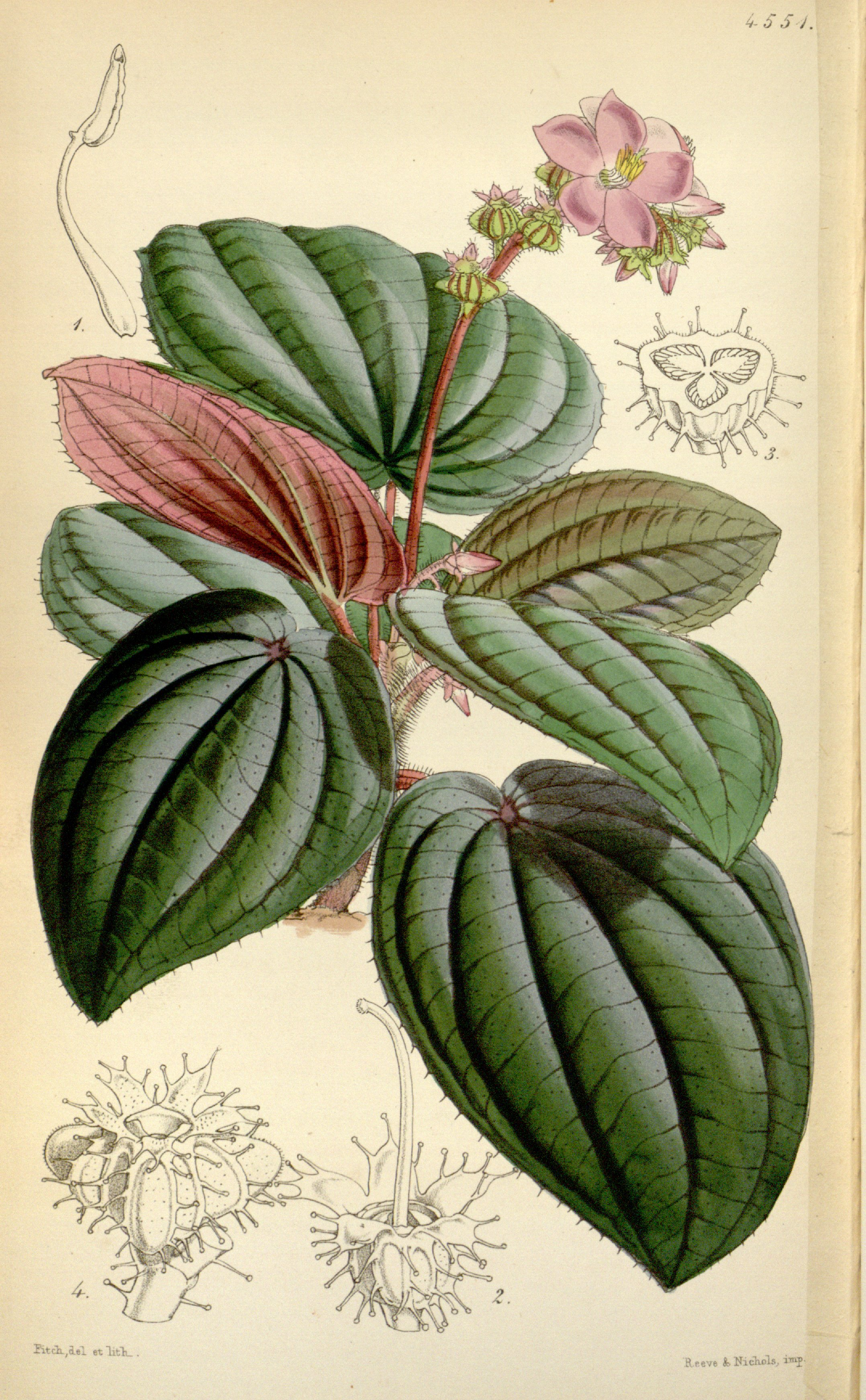
Bertolonia

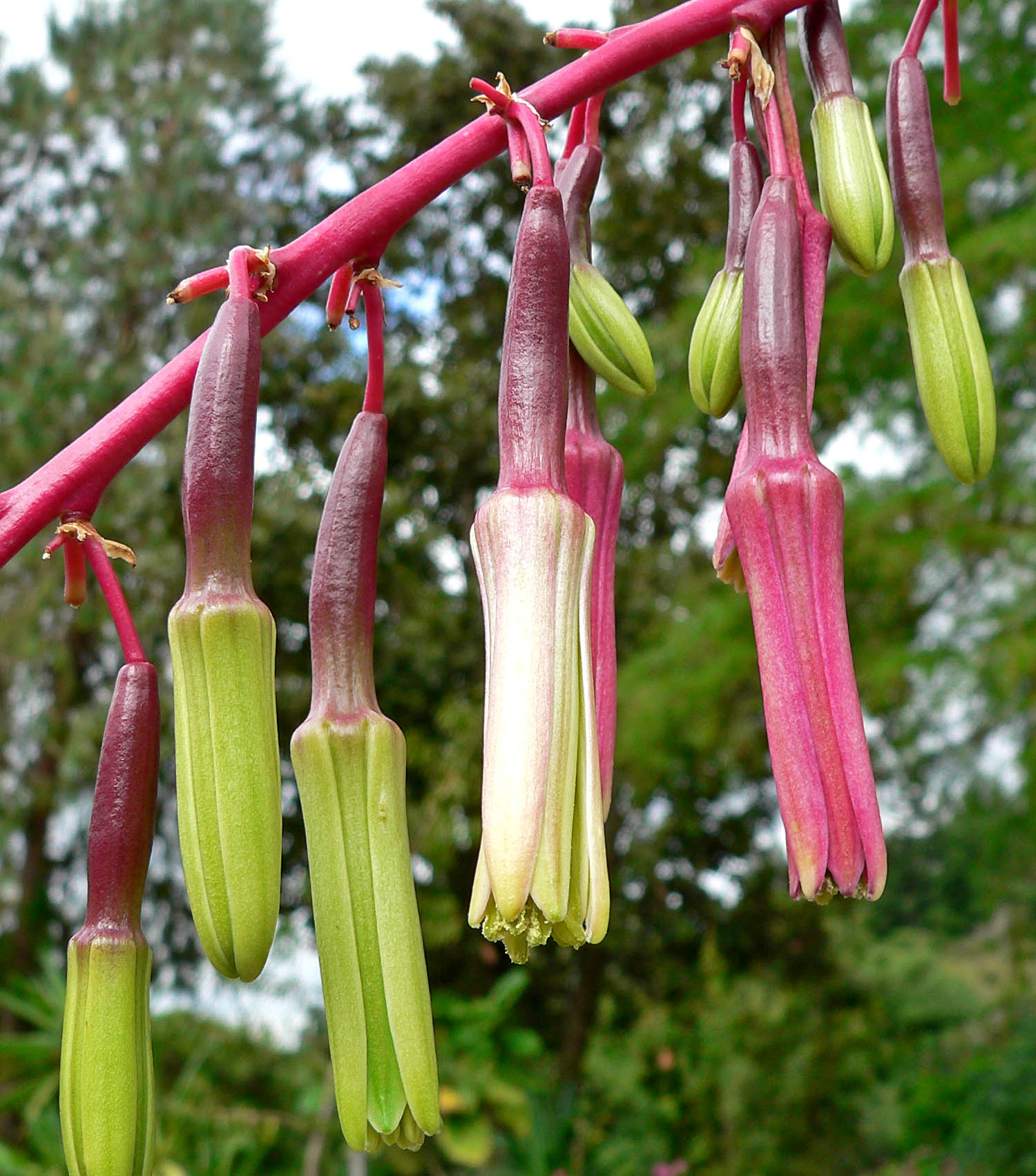
Beschorneria

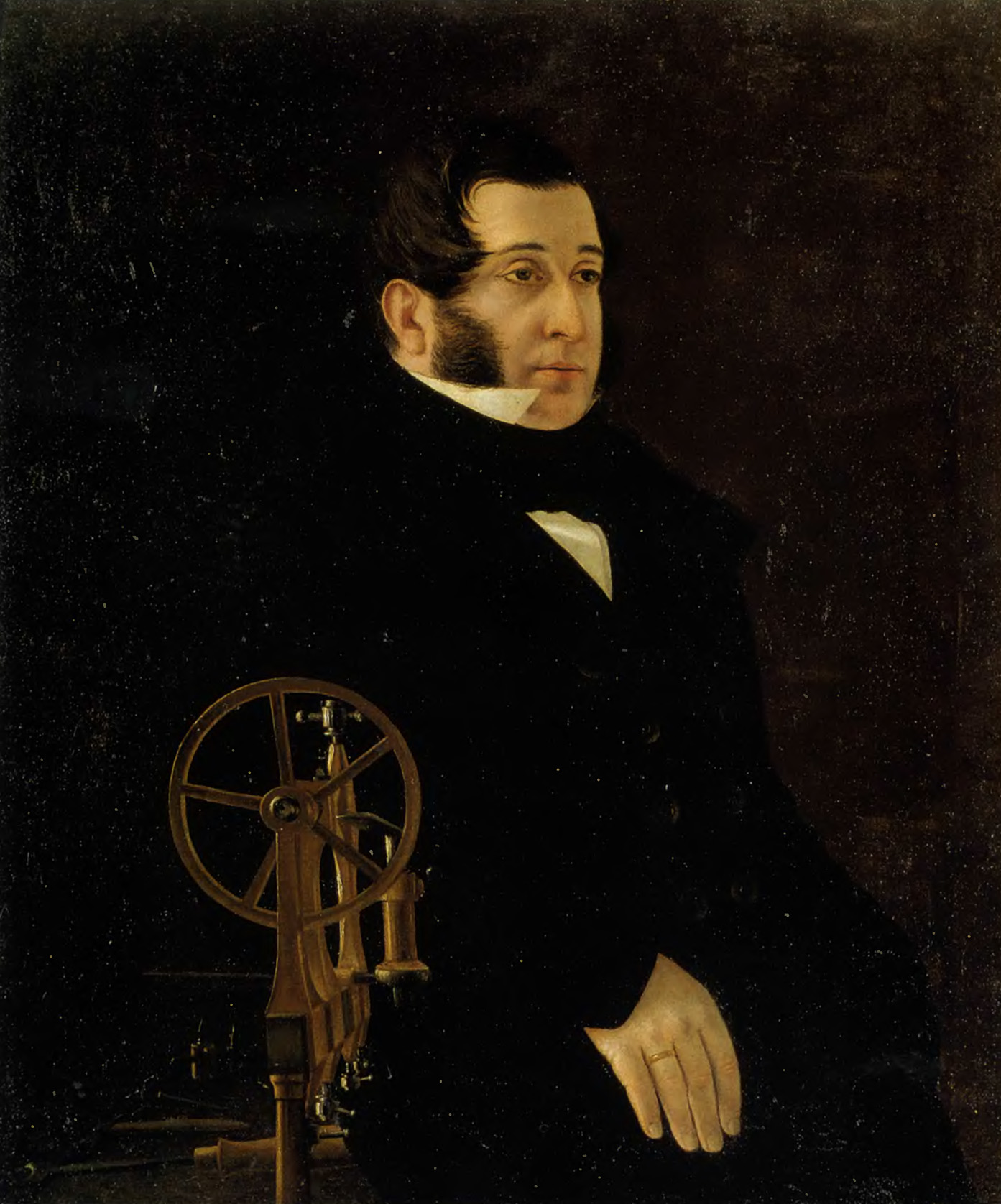
Portrait of Wilibald Swibert Joseph Gottlieb von Besser

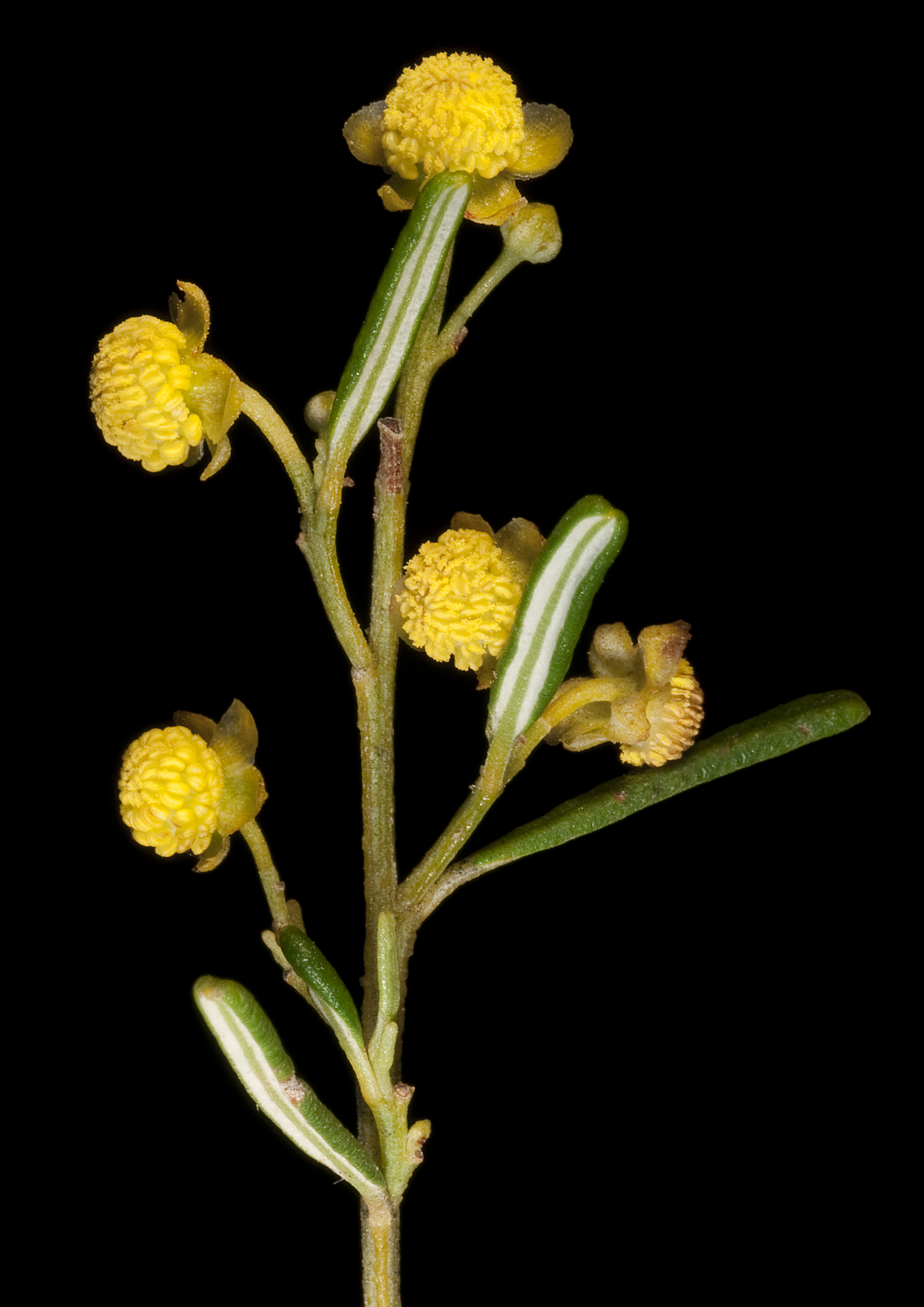
Beyeria lechenaultii

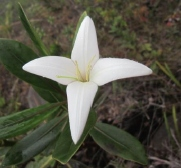
Bikkia

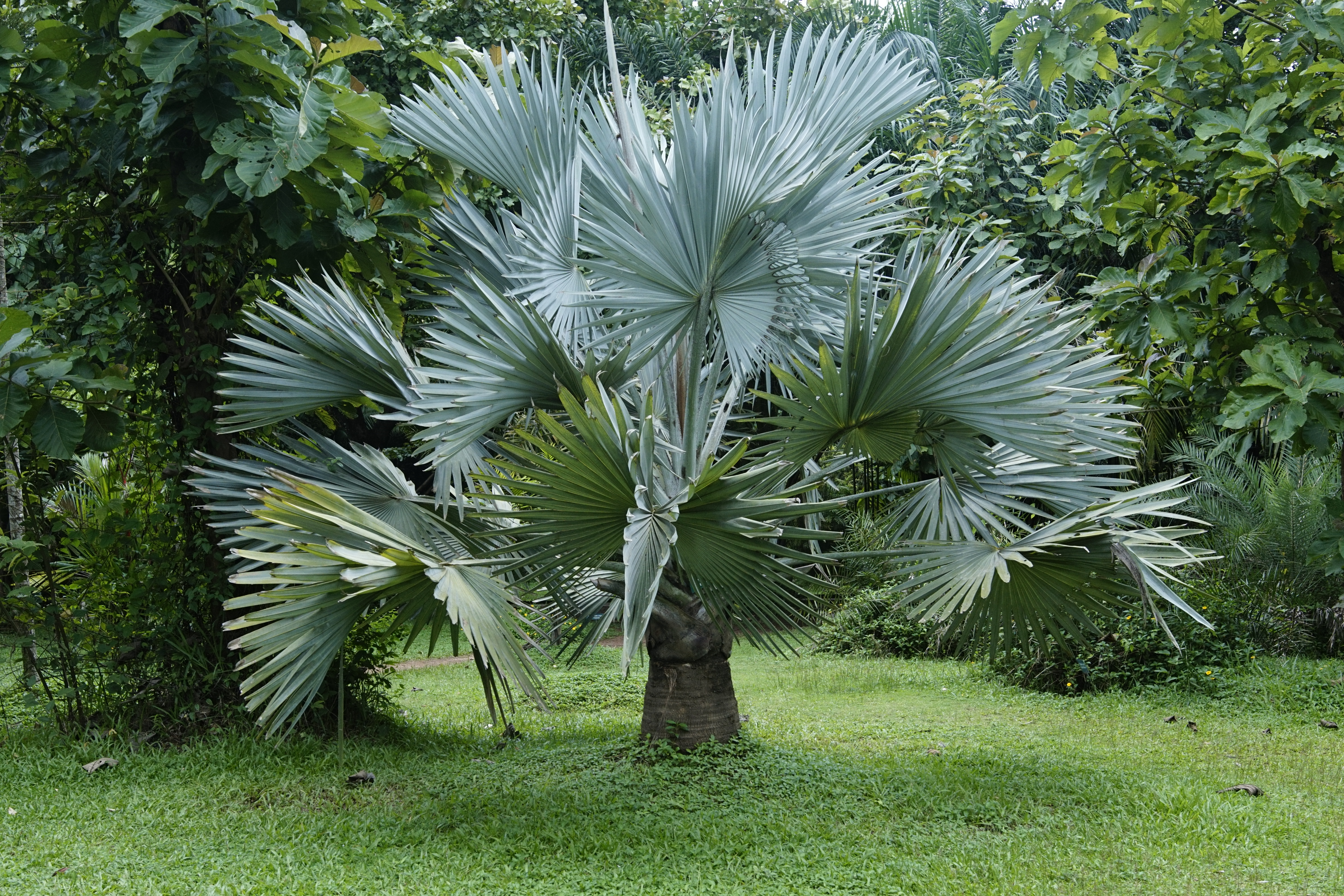
Bismarckia

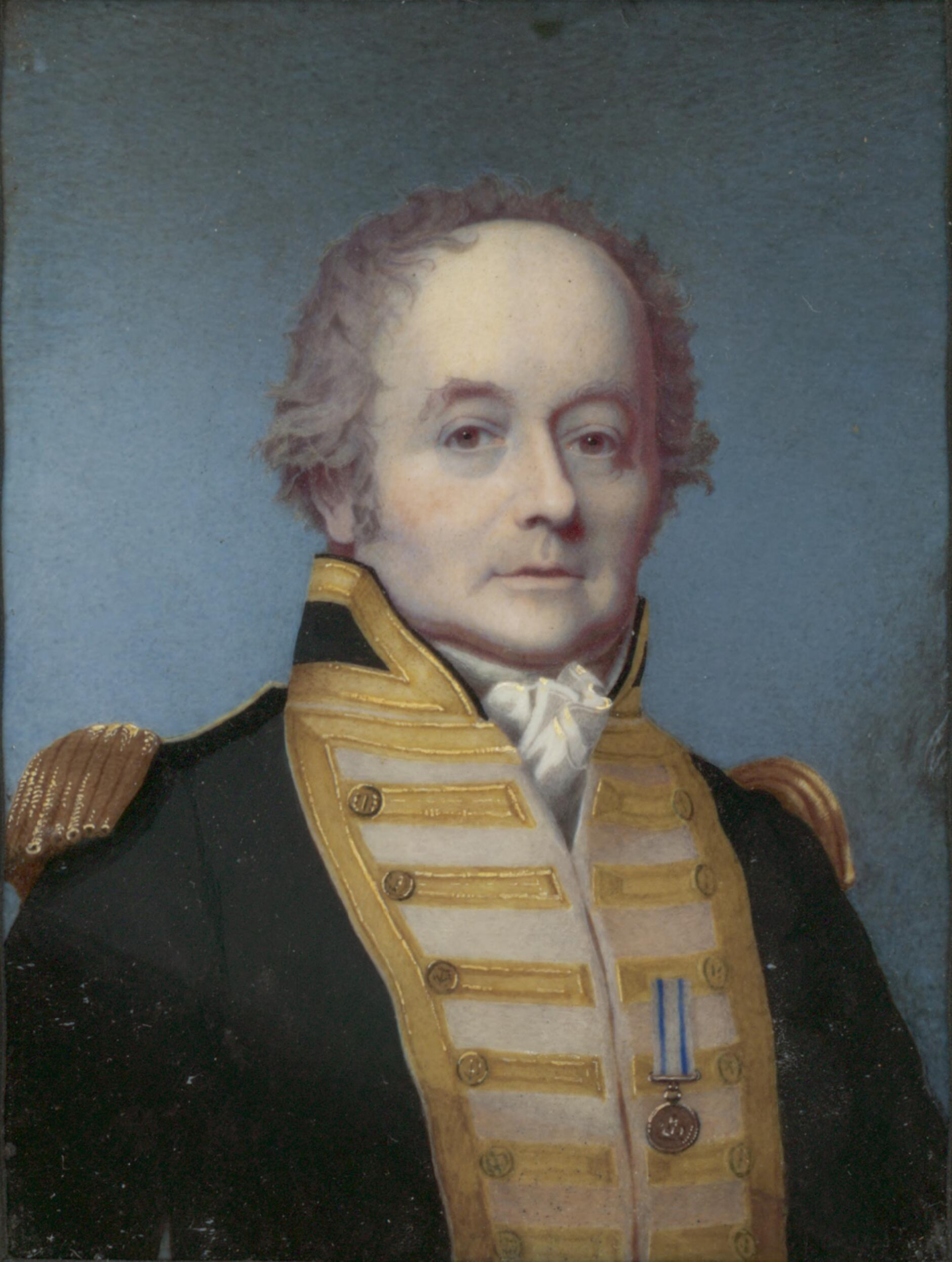
William Bligh

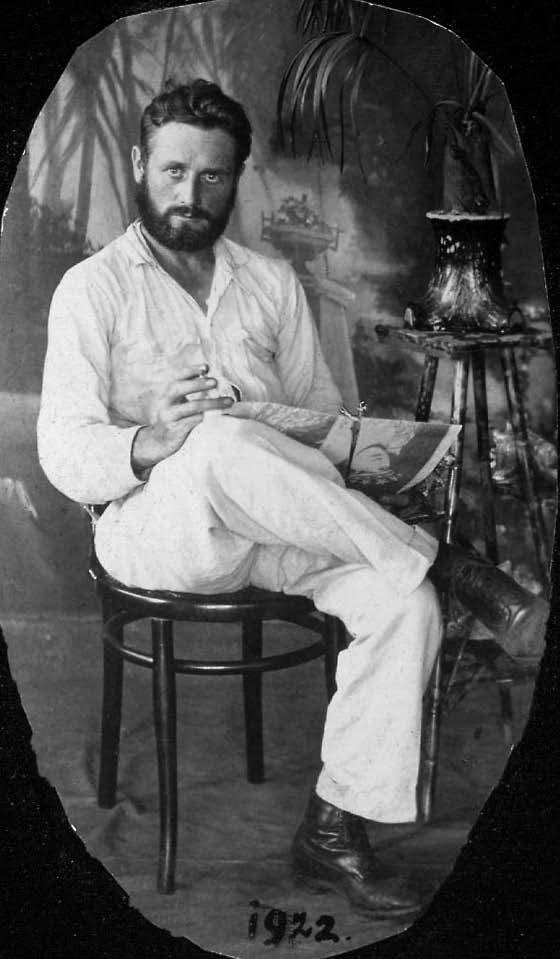
Frans Blom

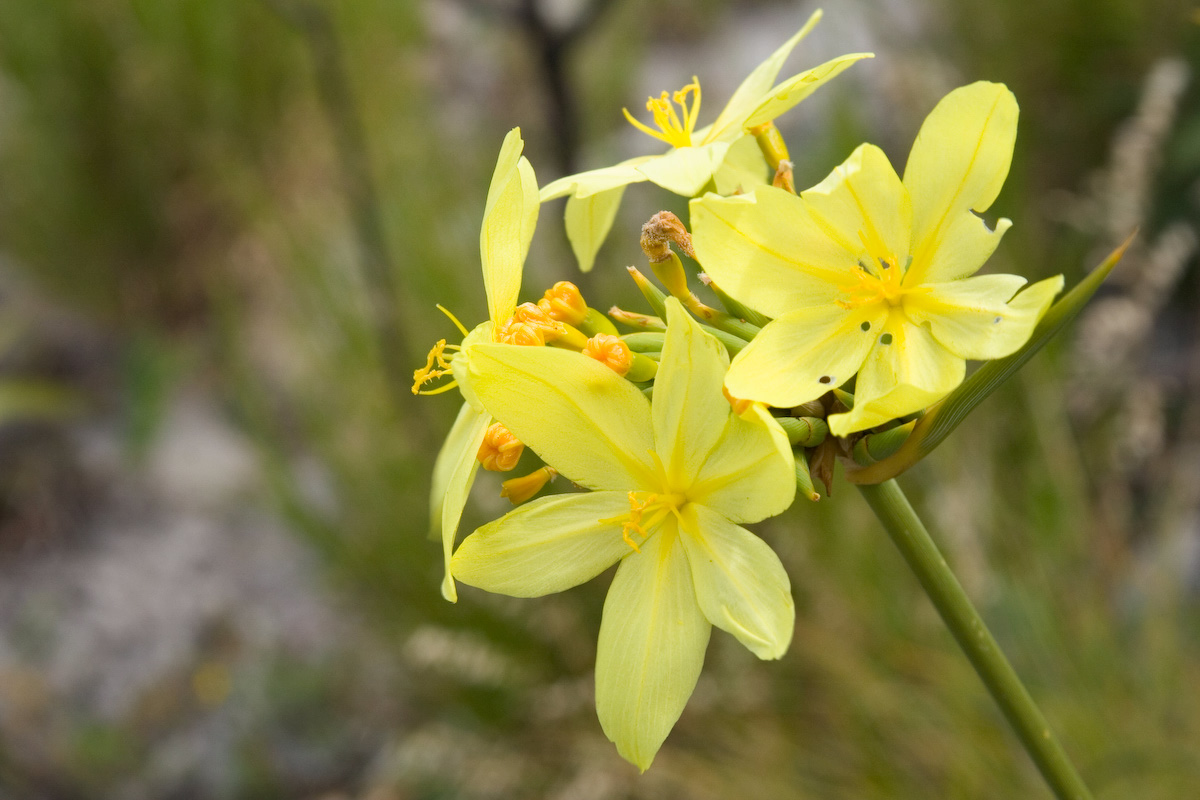
Bobartia

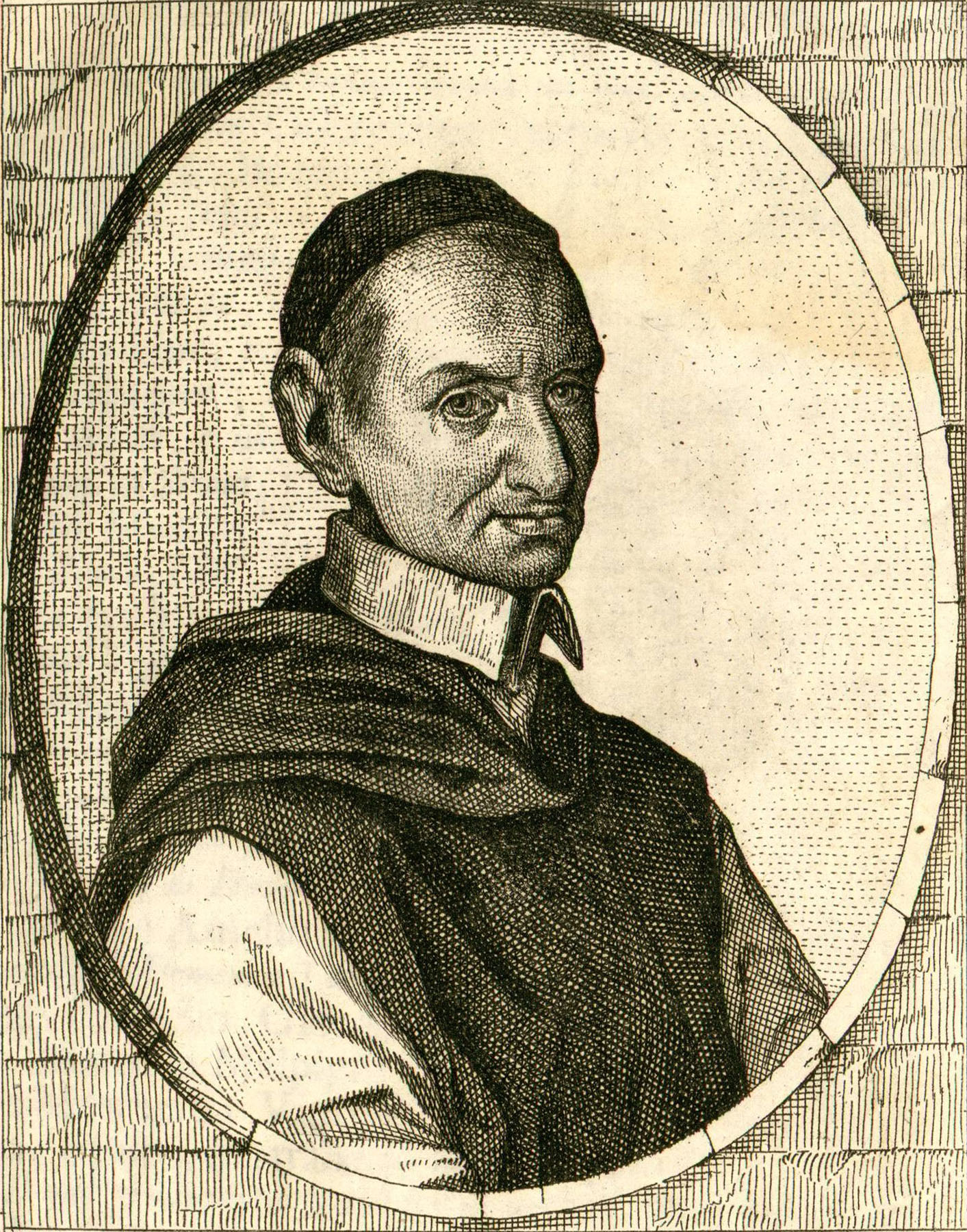
Paolo Boccone

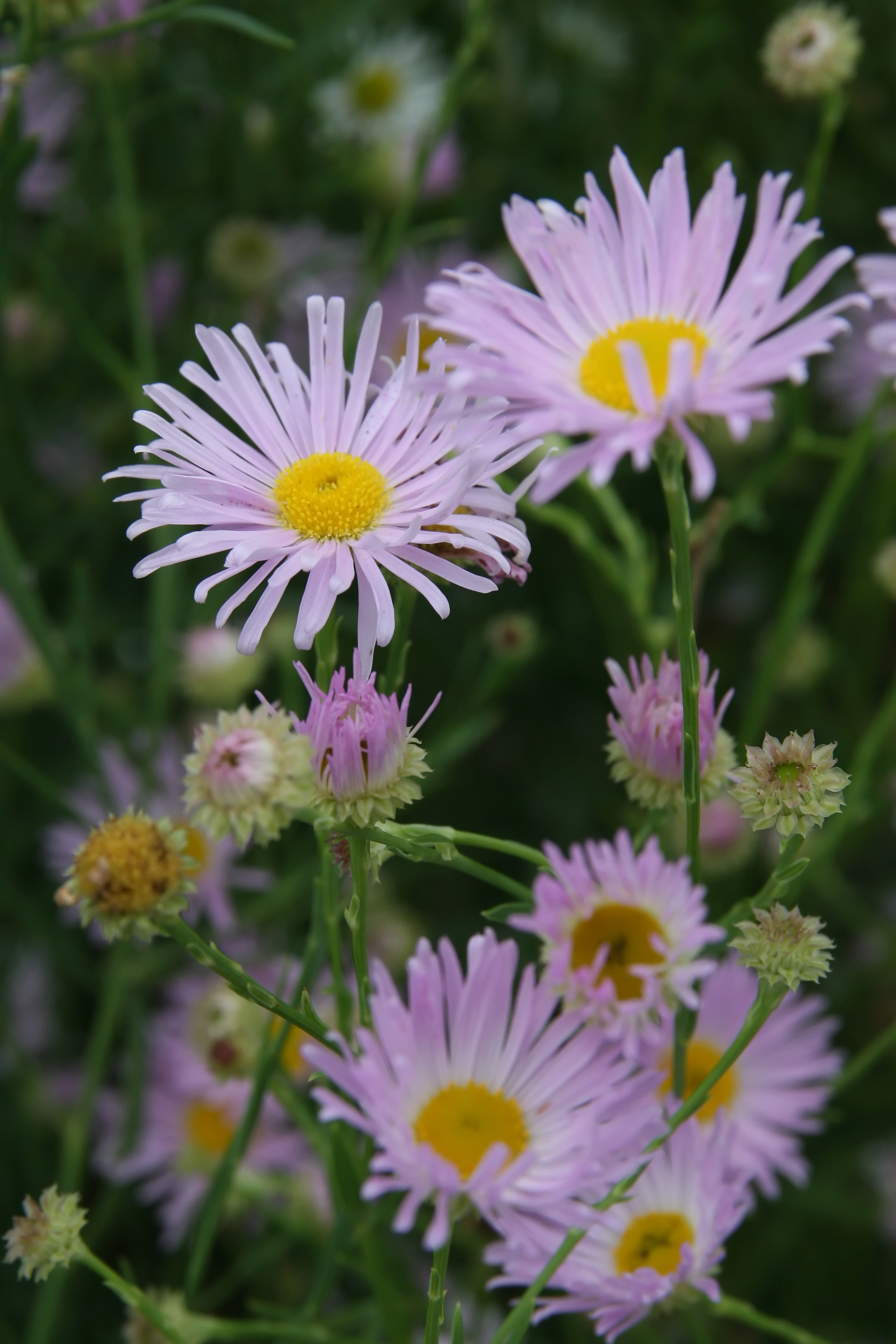
Boltonia asteroides

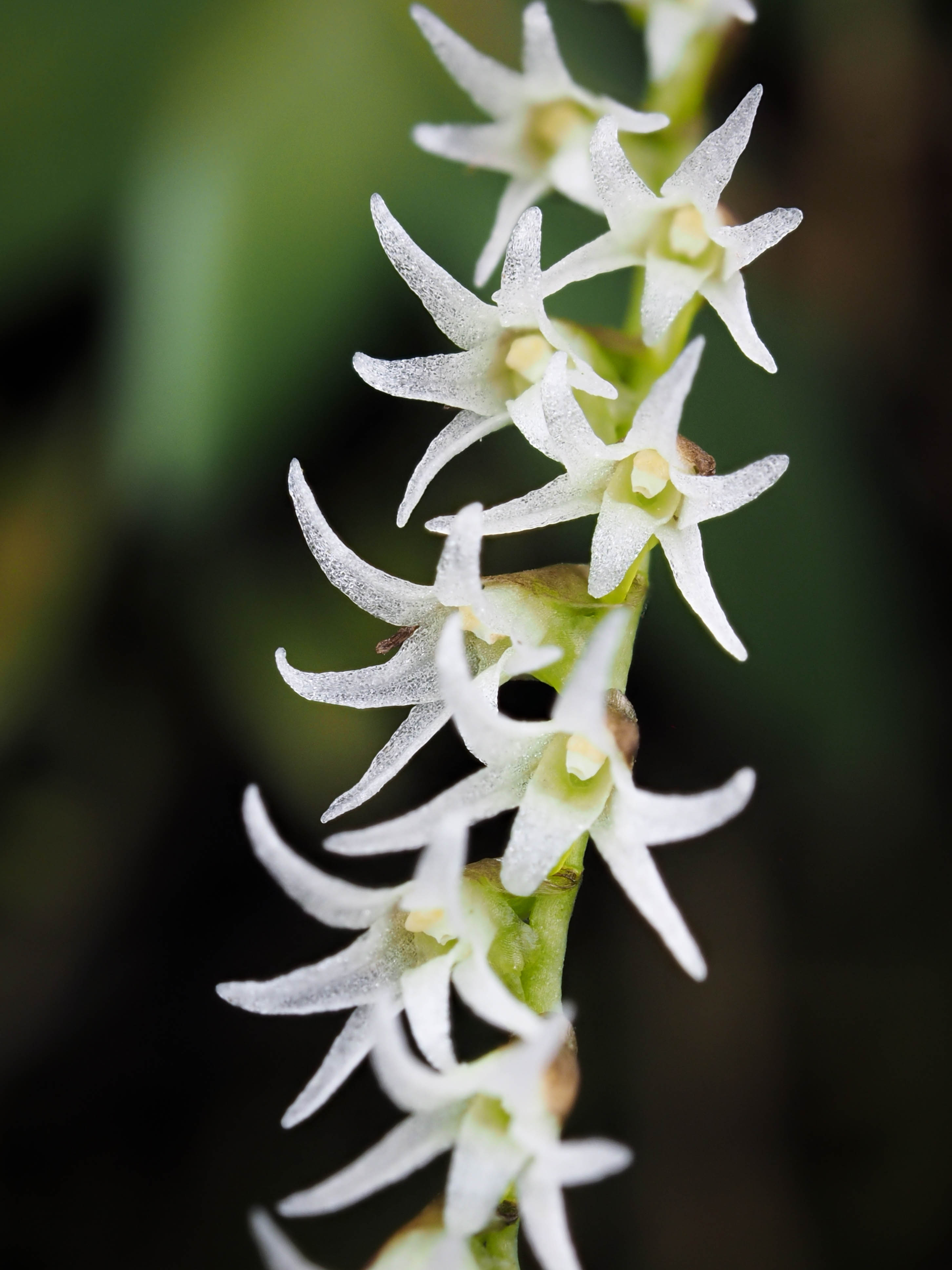
Bolusiella

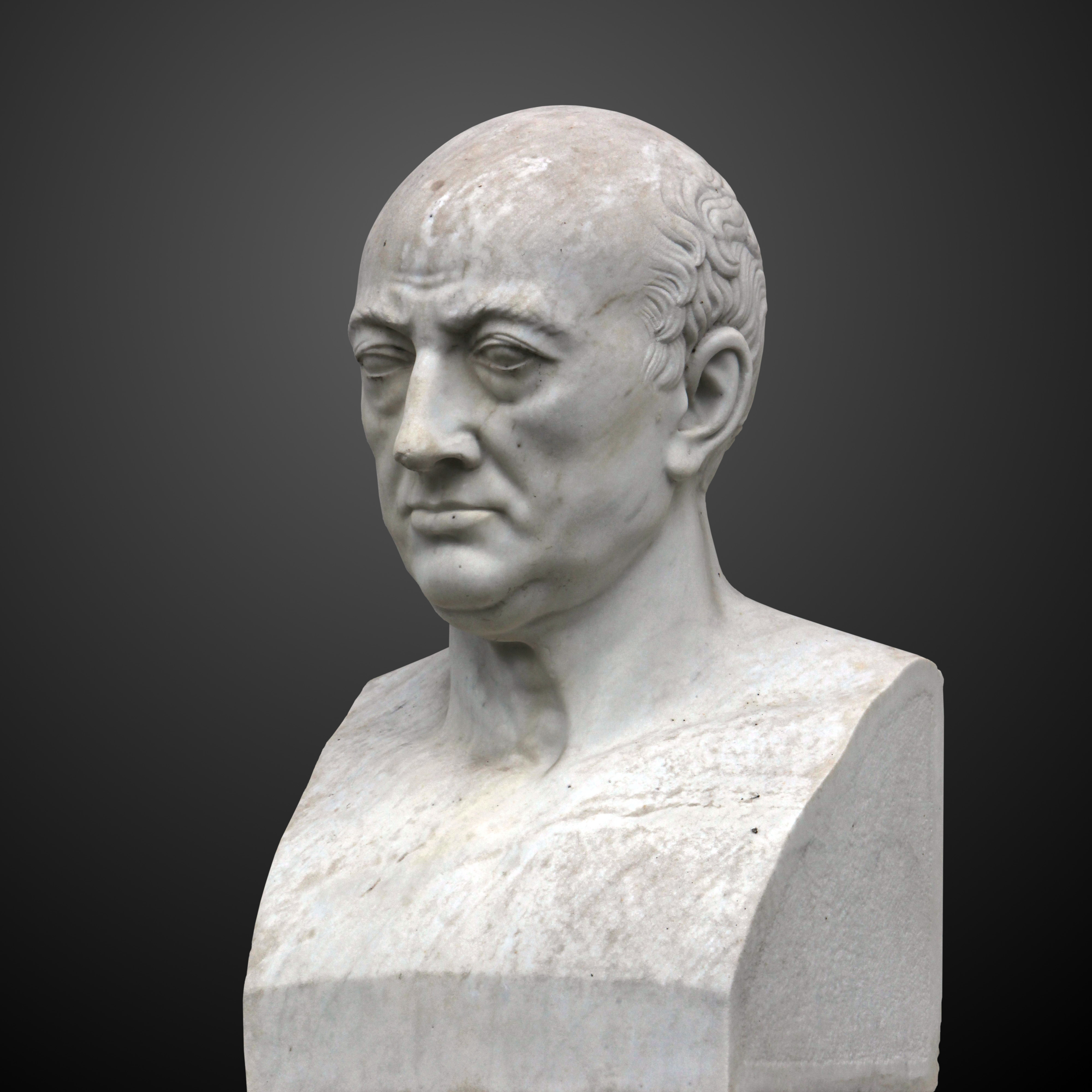
Bust of Charles Bonnet

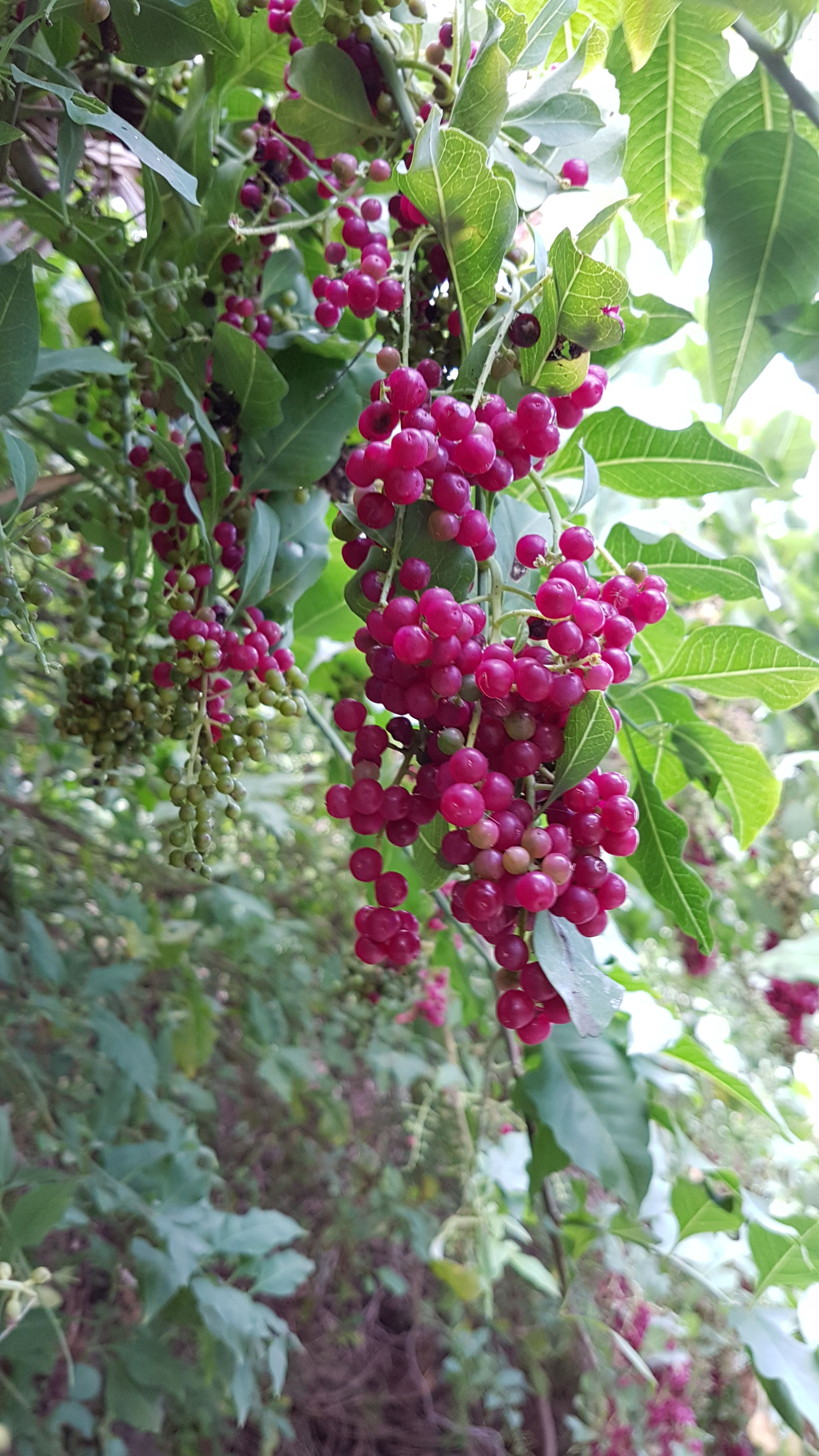
Bosea yervamora berries

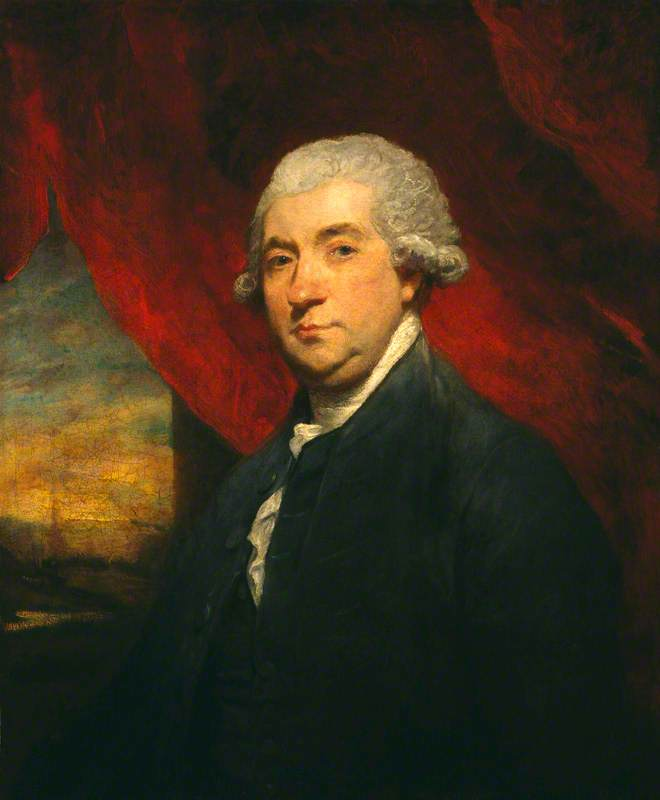
Portrait of James Boswell by Joshua Reynolds

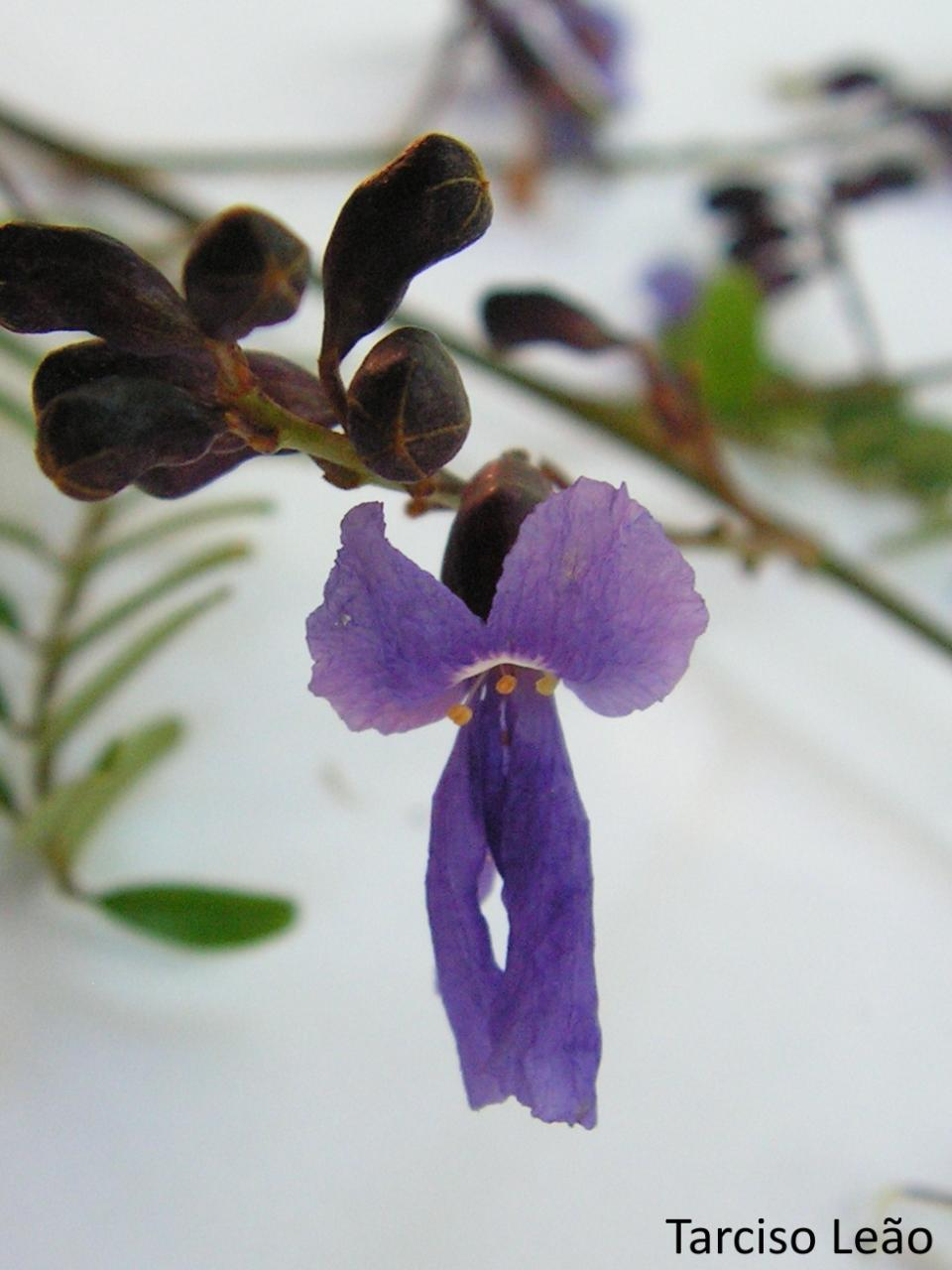
Bowdichia

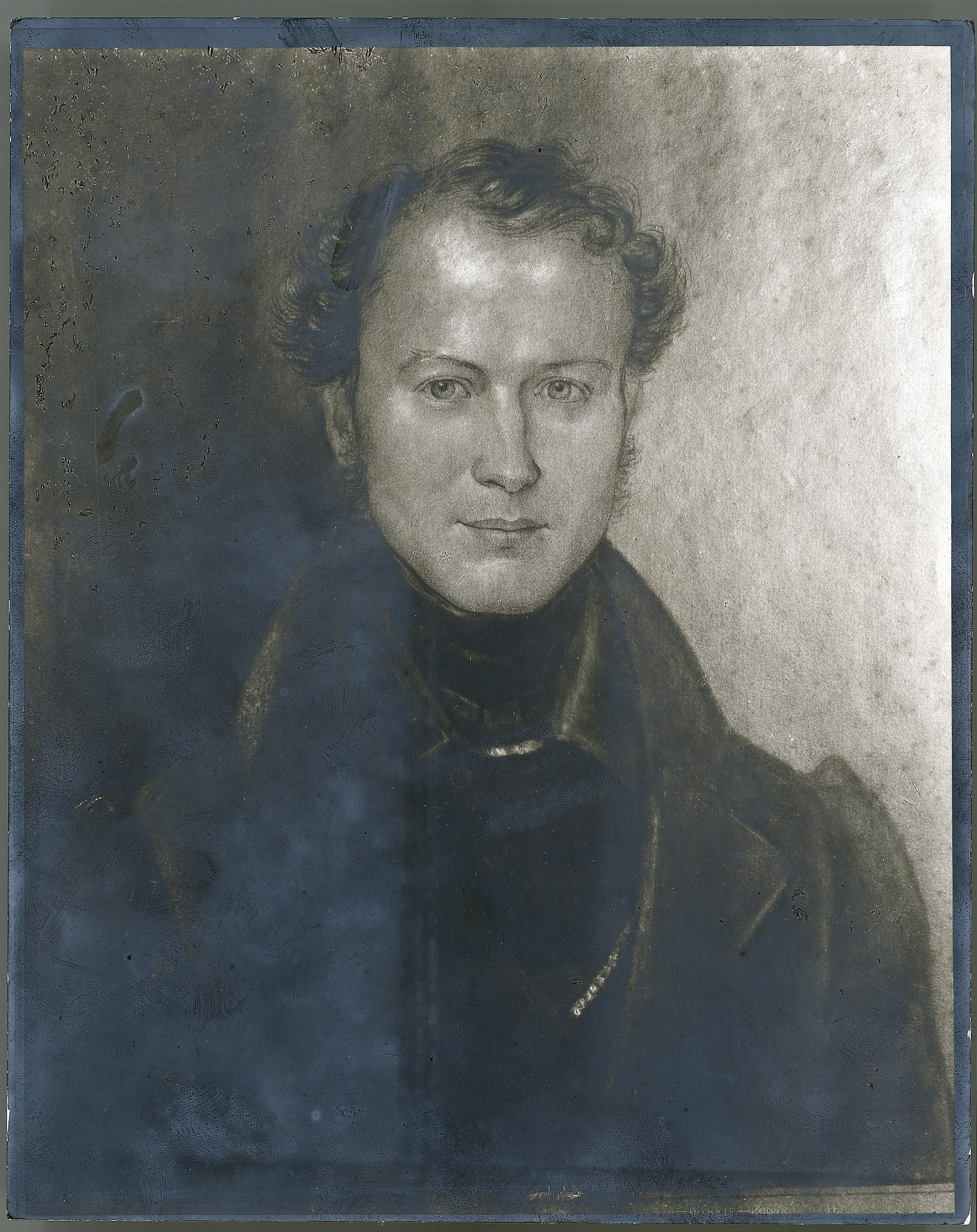
William Brackenridge

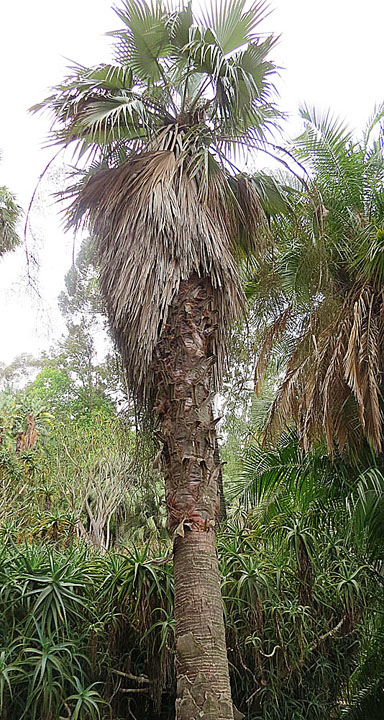
Brahea calcarea

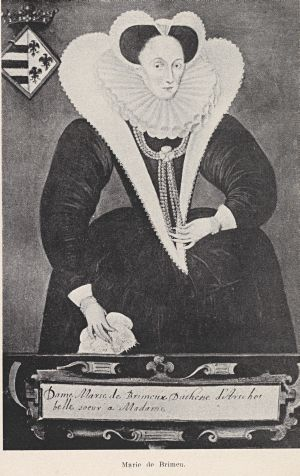
Marie de Brimeu

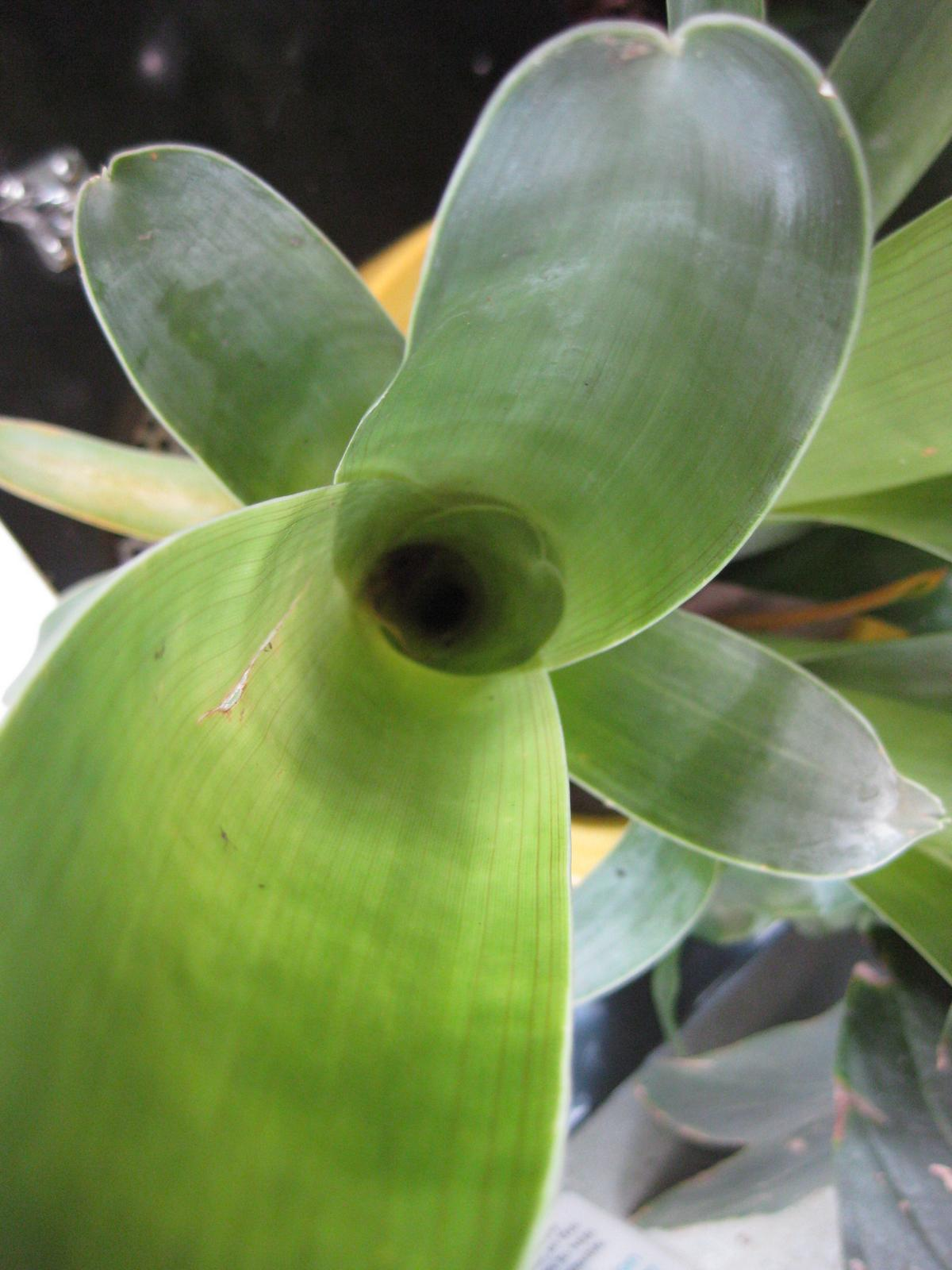
Brocchinia

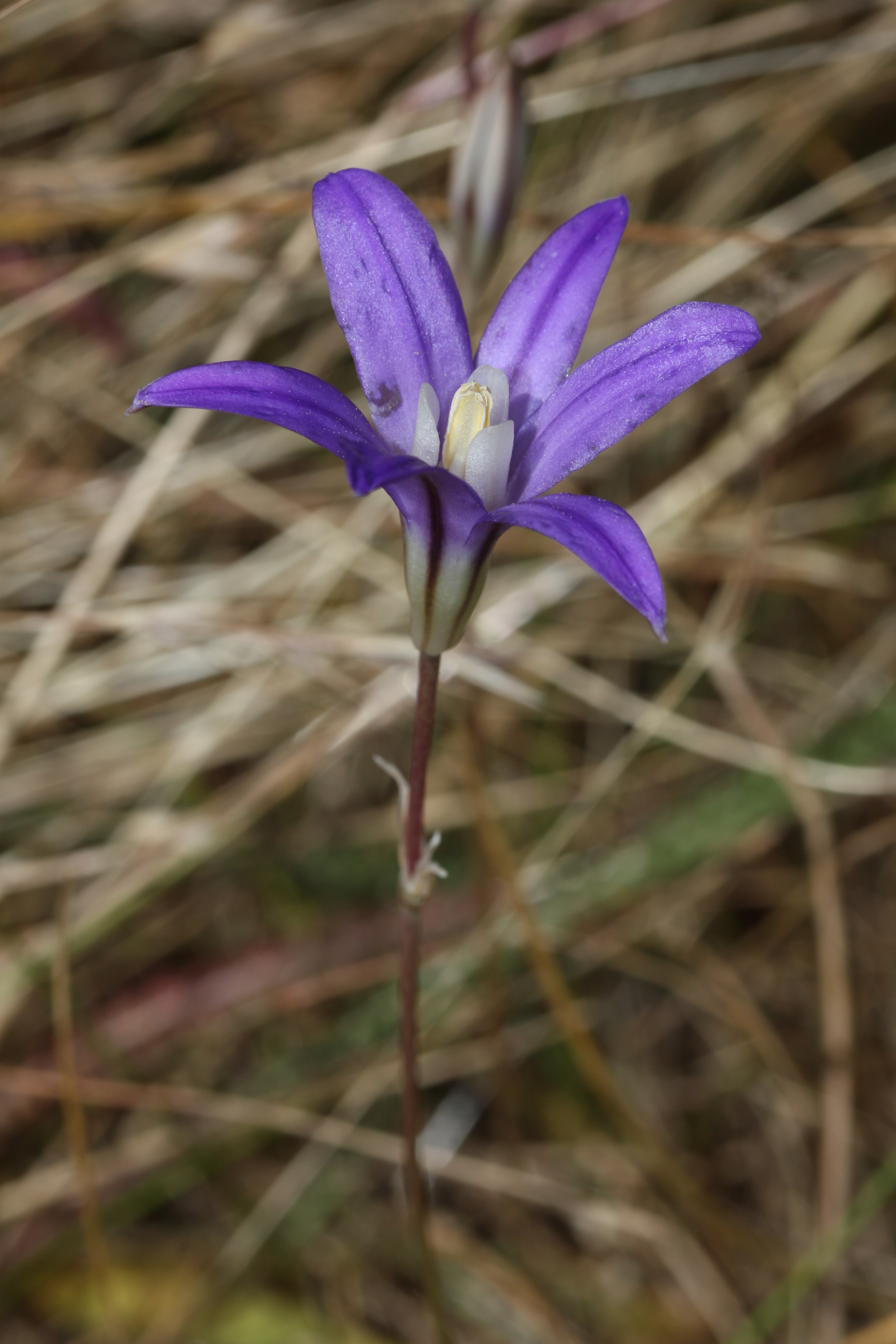
Brodiaea

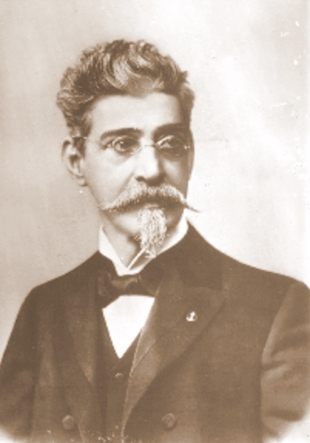
João Barbosa Rodrigues

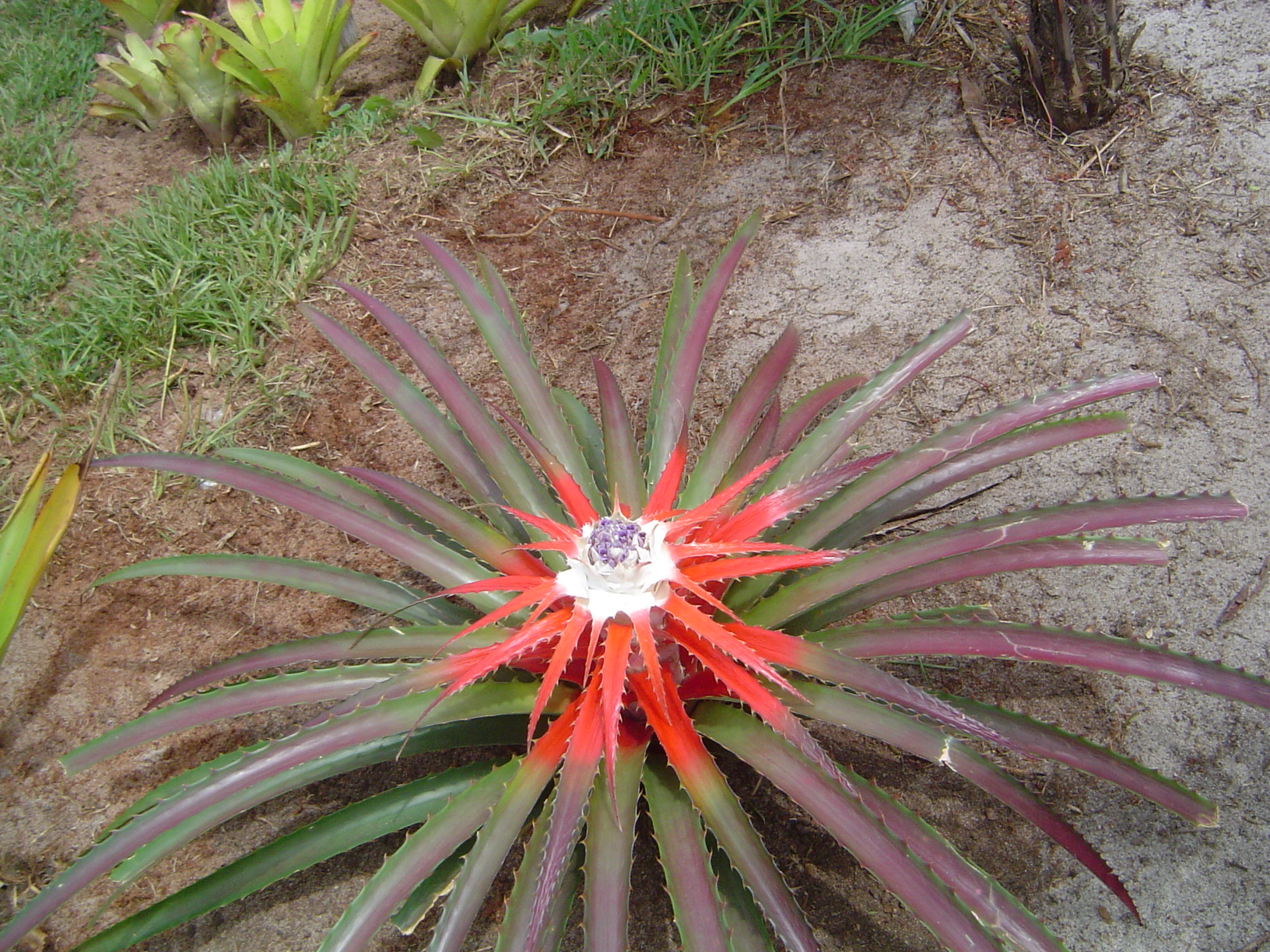
Bromelia balansae

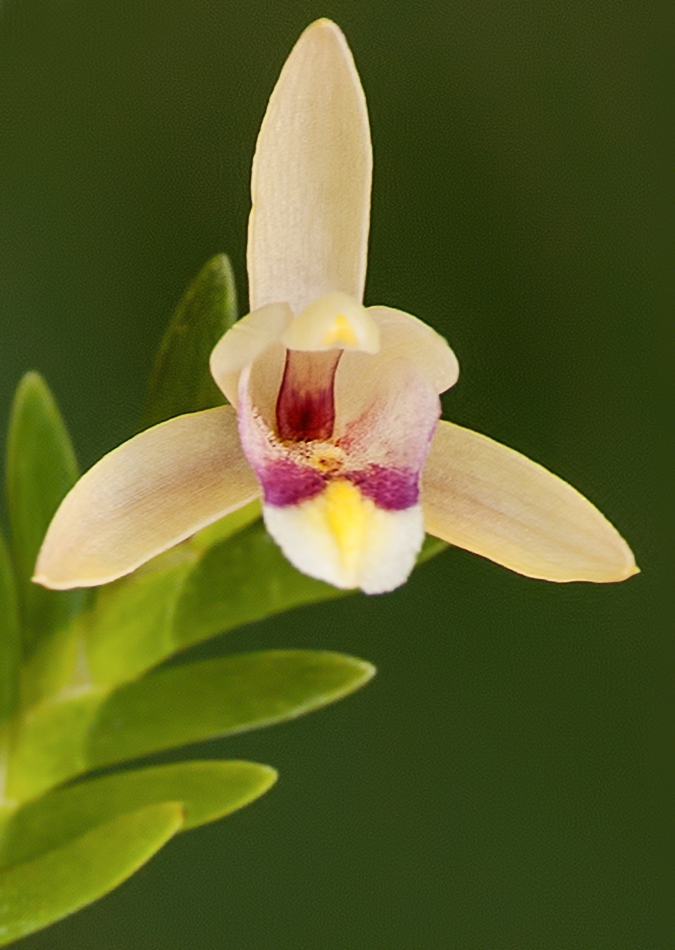
Bromheadia brevifolia

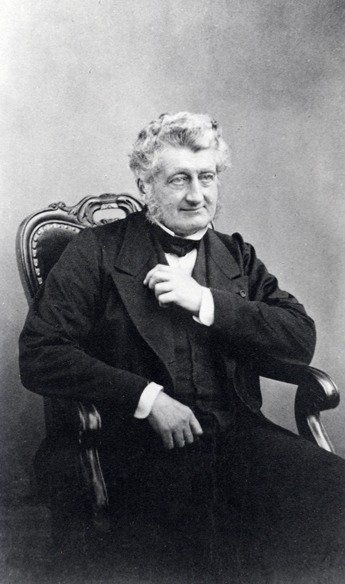
Adolphe-Théodore Brongniart

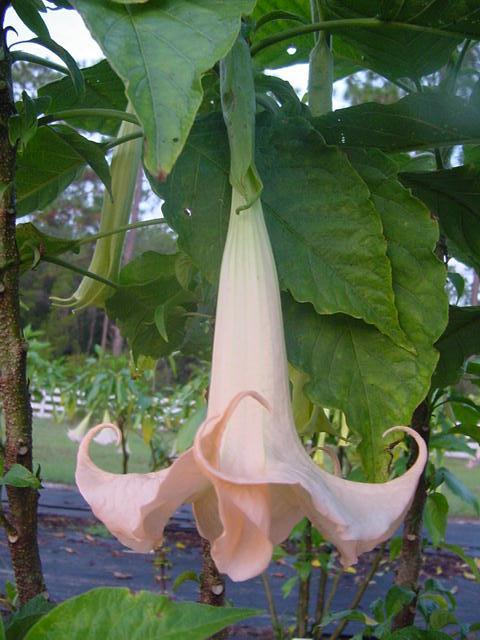
Brugmansia

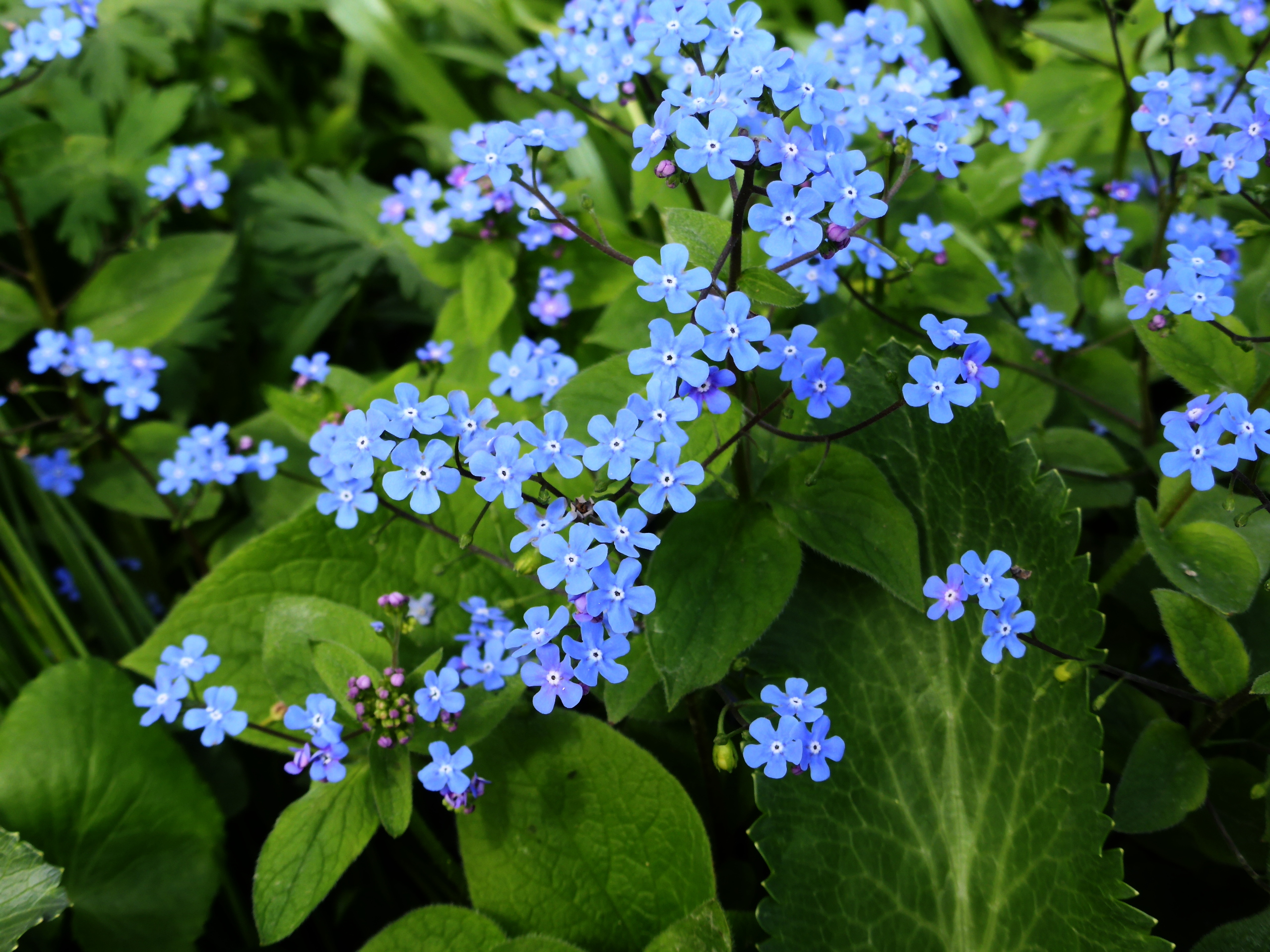
Brunnera

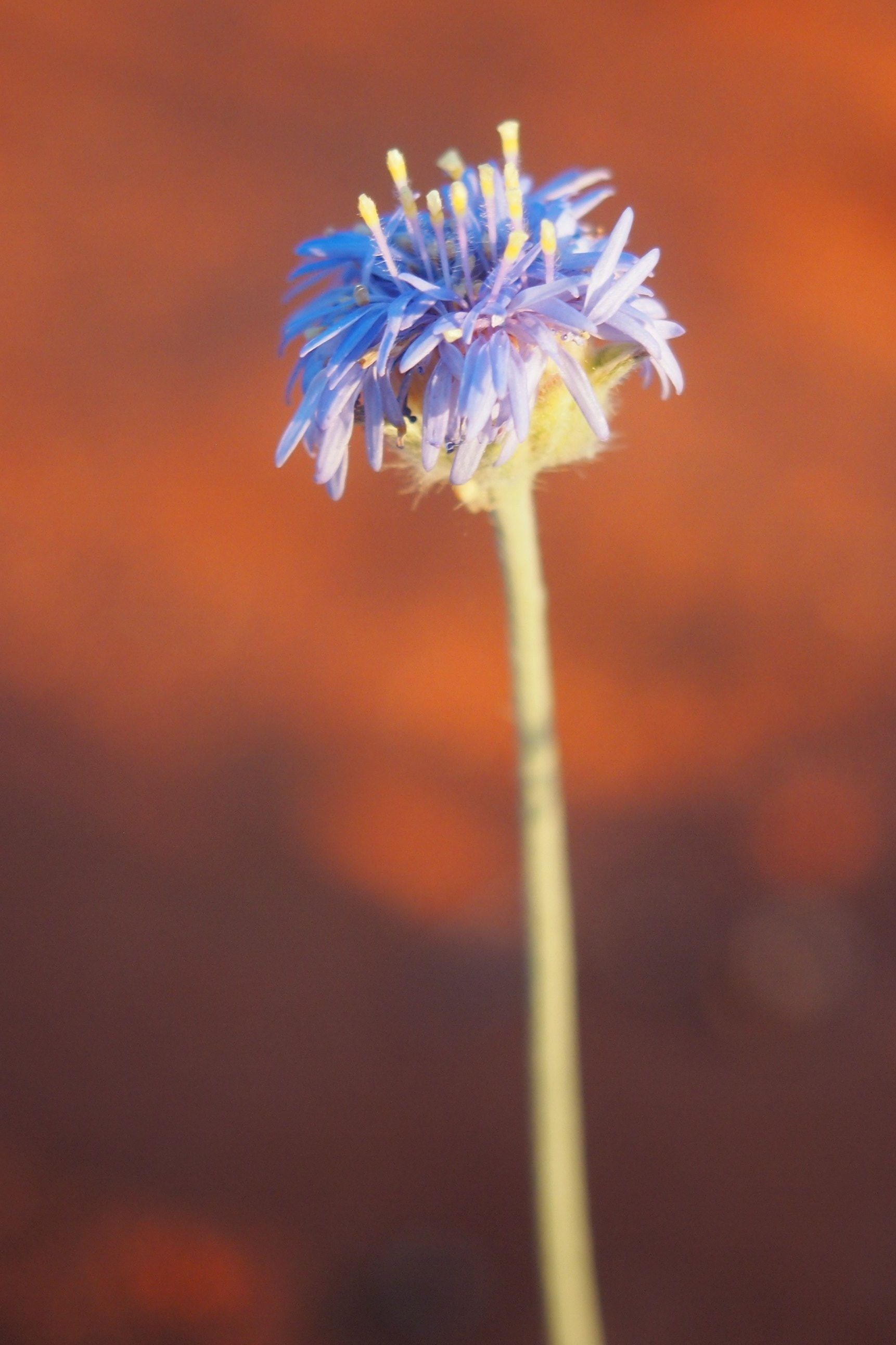
Brunonia

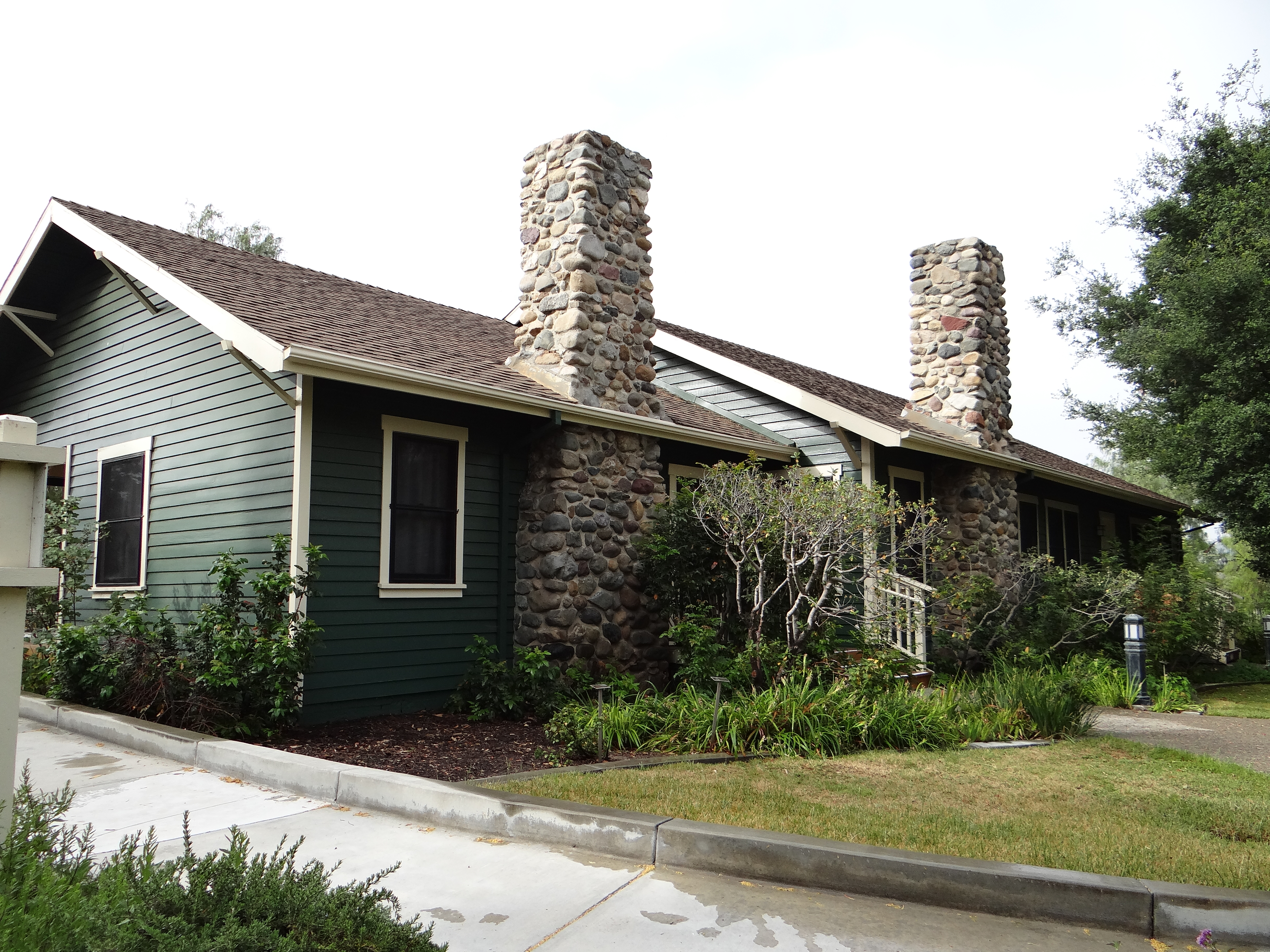
Susanna Bixby Bryant Museum

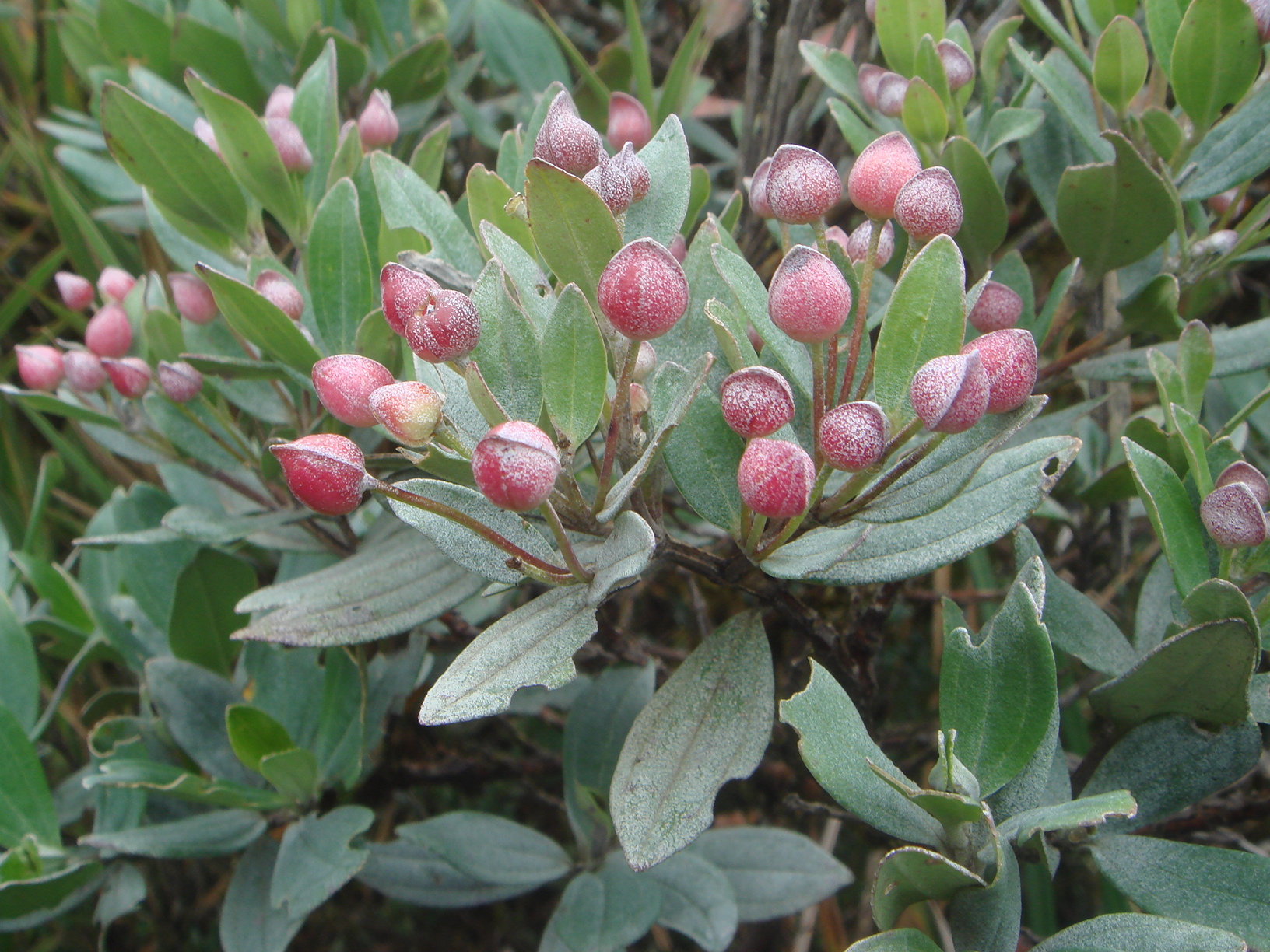
Bucquetia

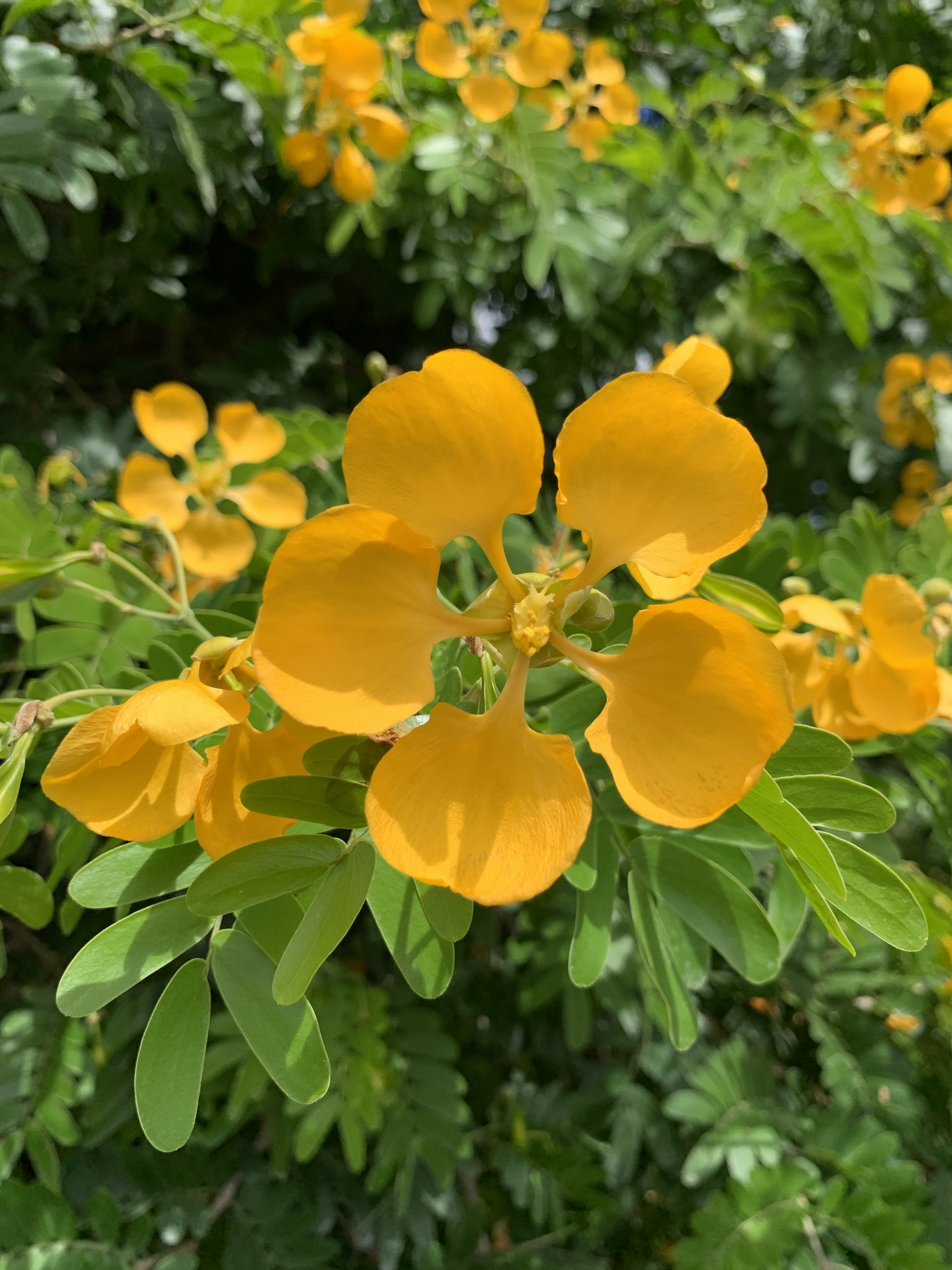
Bulnesia

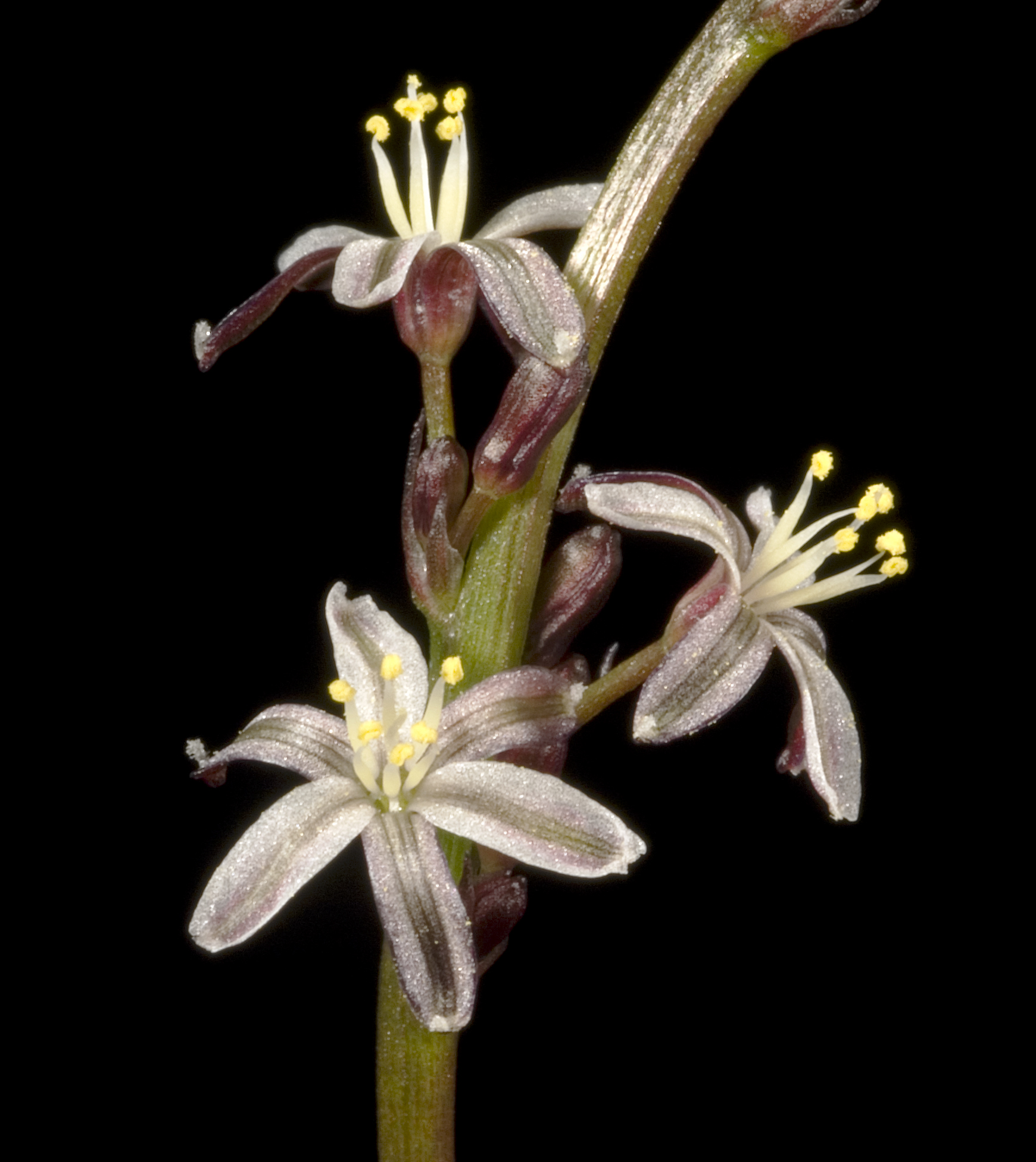
Caesia

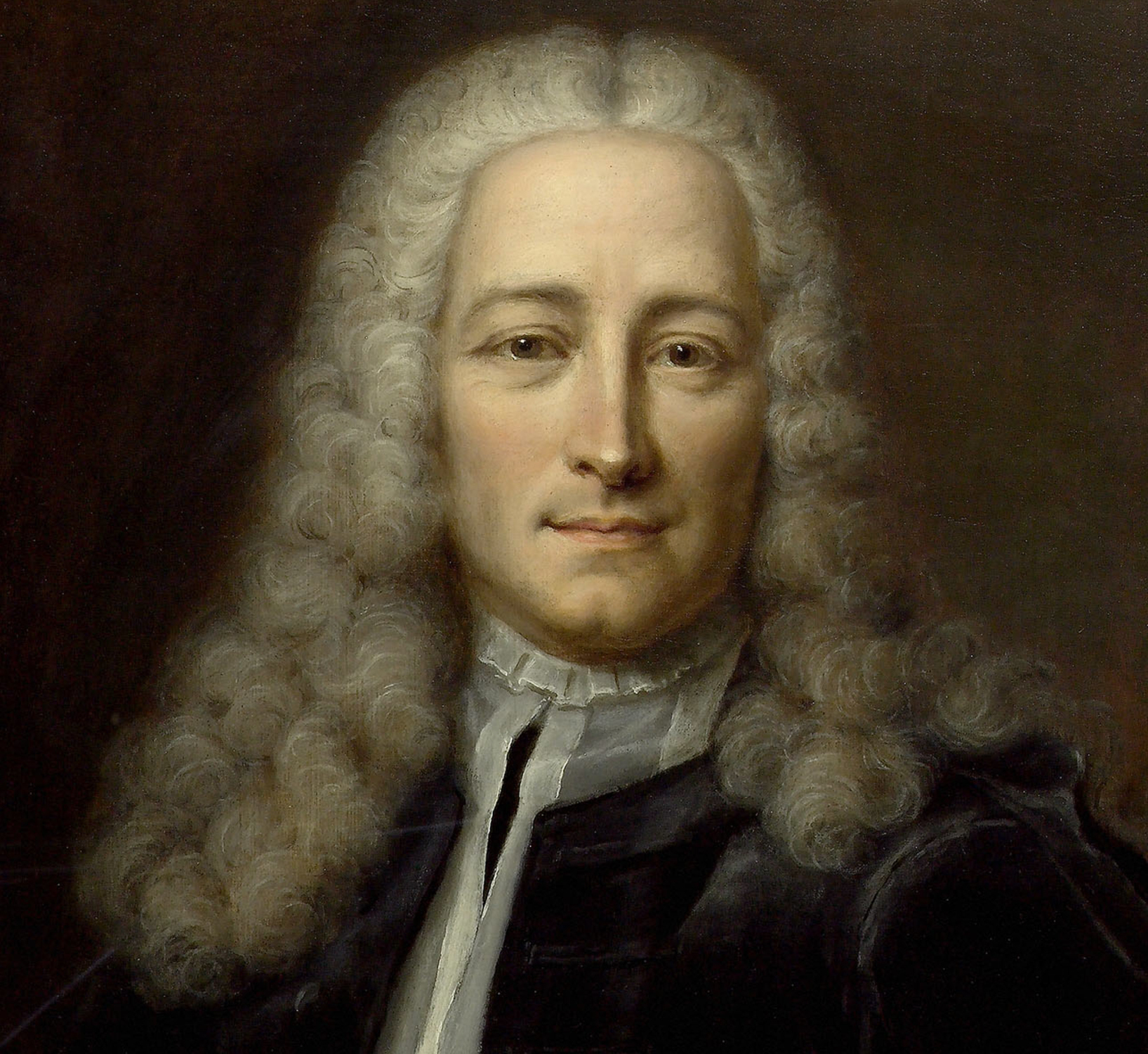
Jean-Louis Calandrini

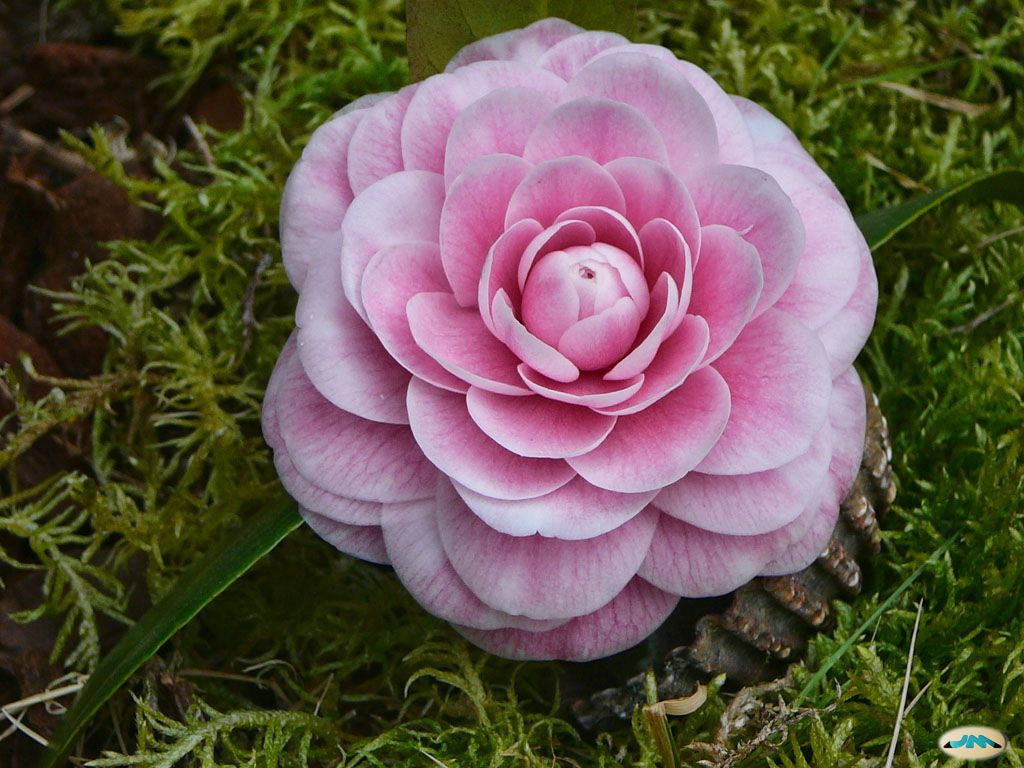
Camellia

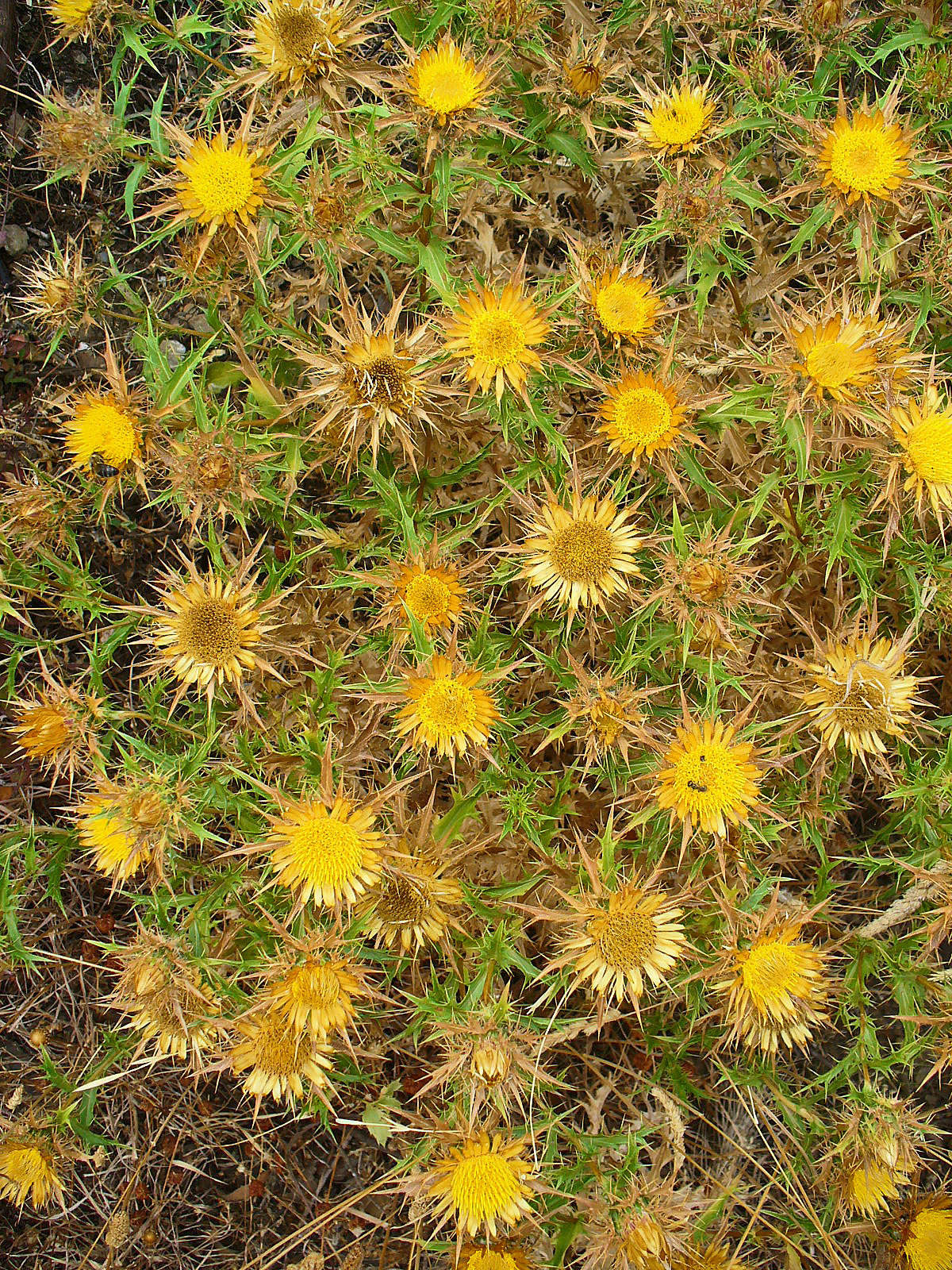
Carlina

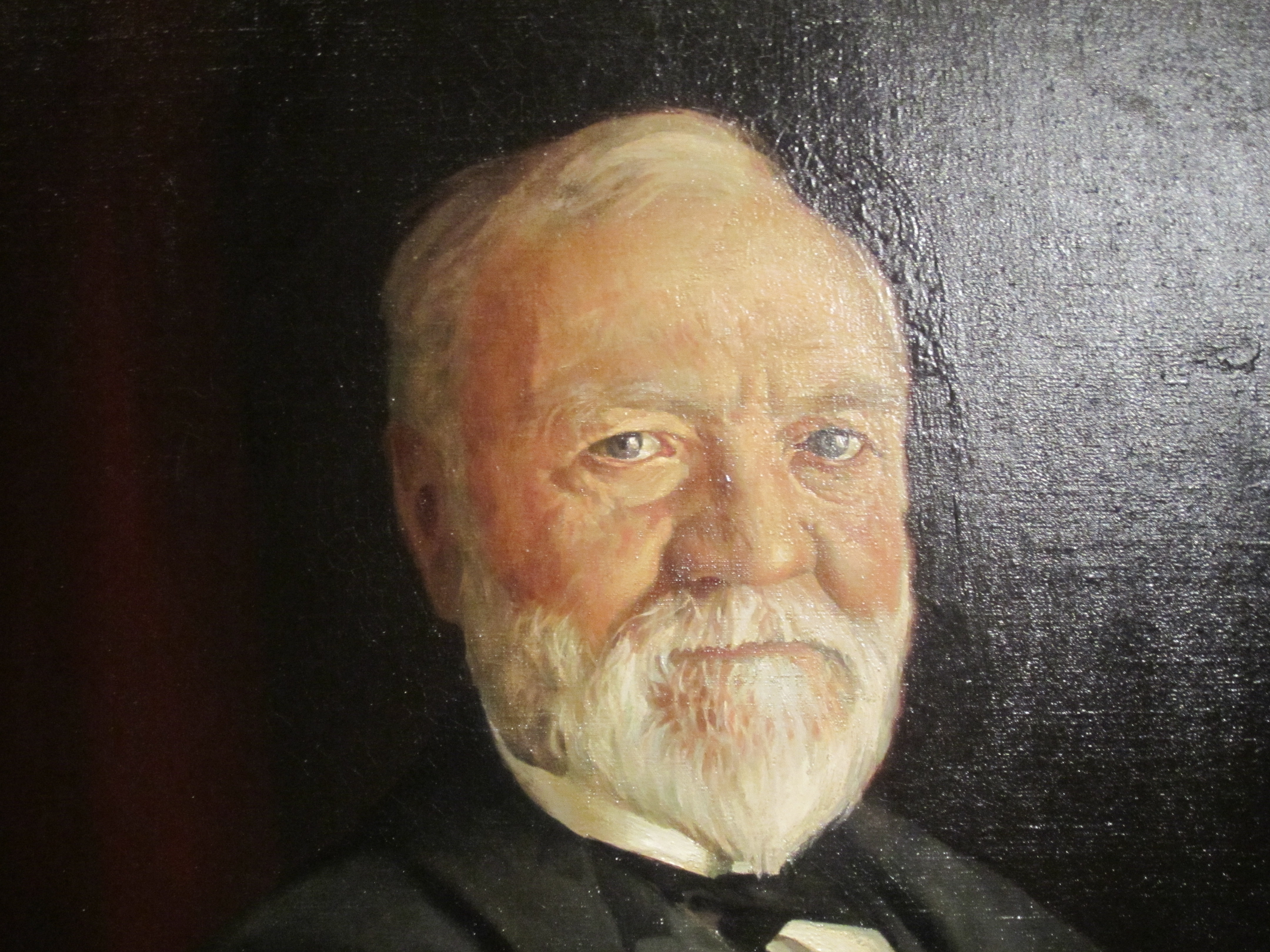
Andrew Carnegie

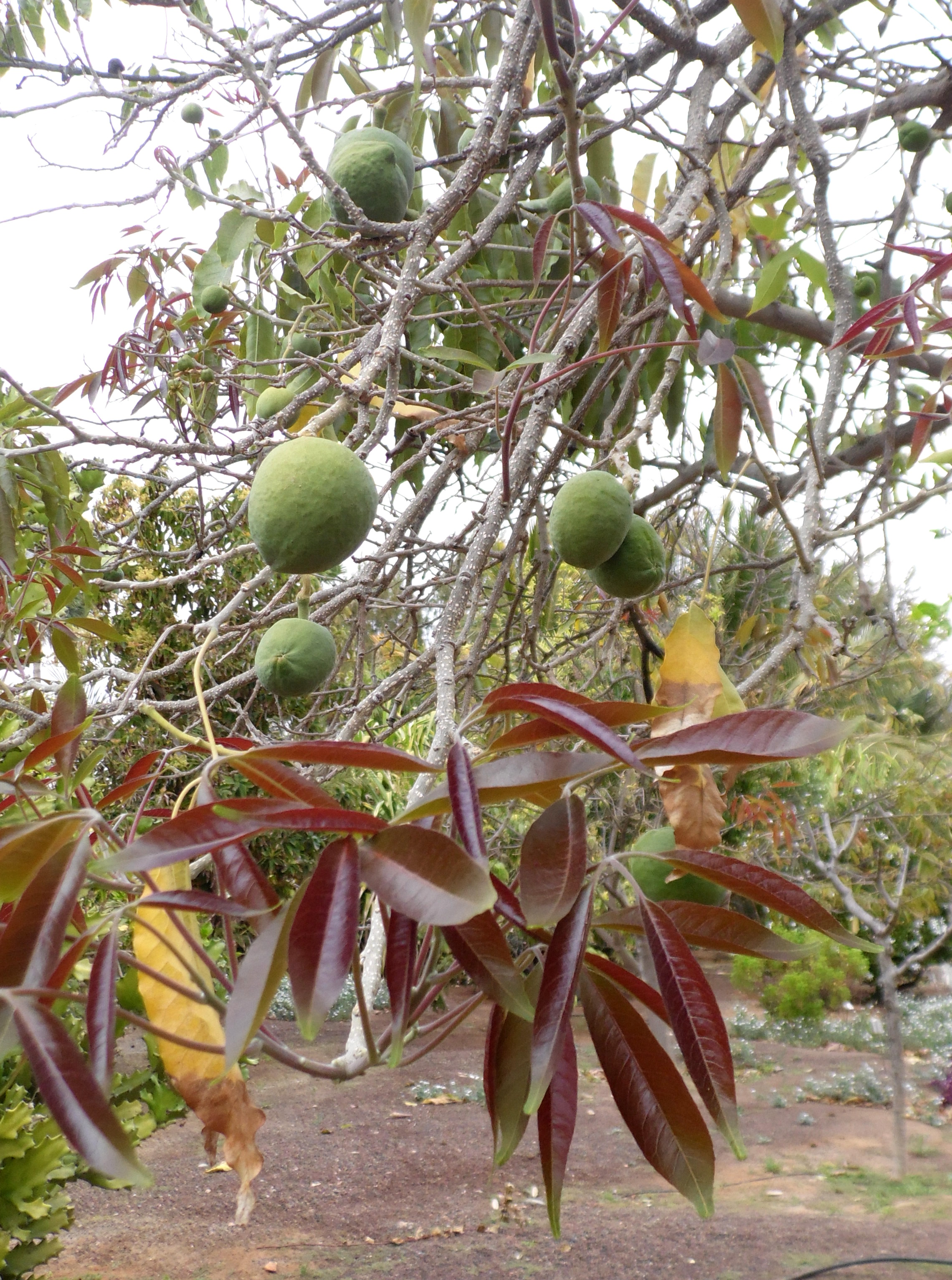
Casimiroa

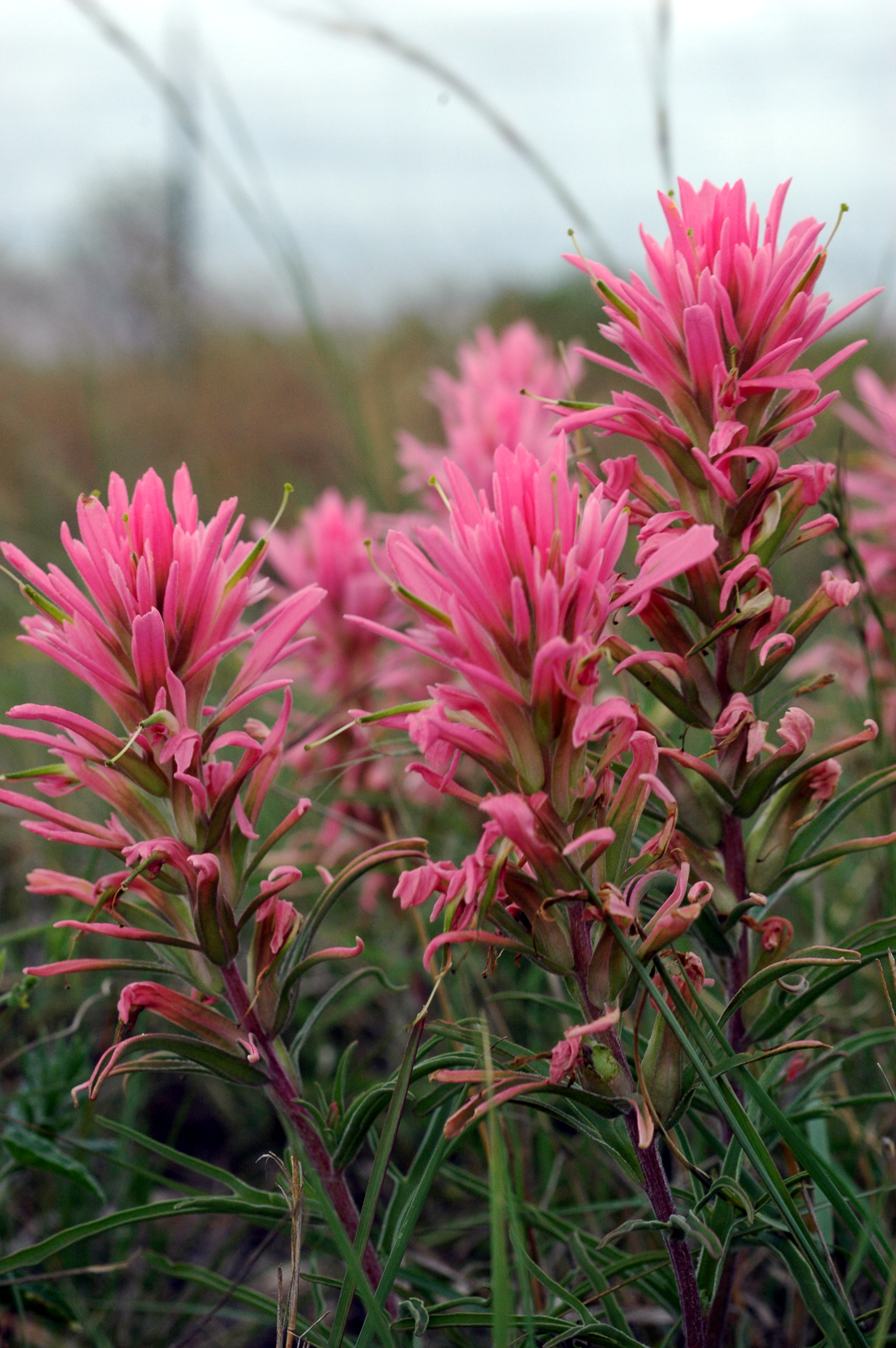
Castilleja

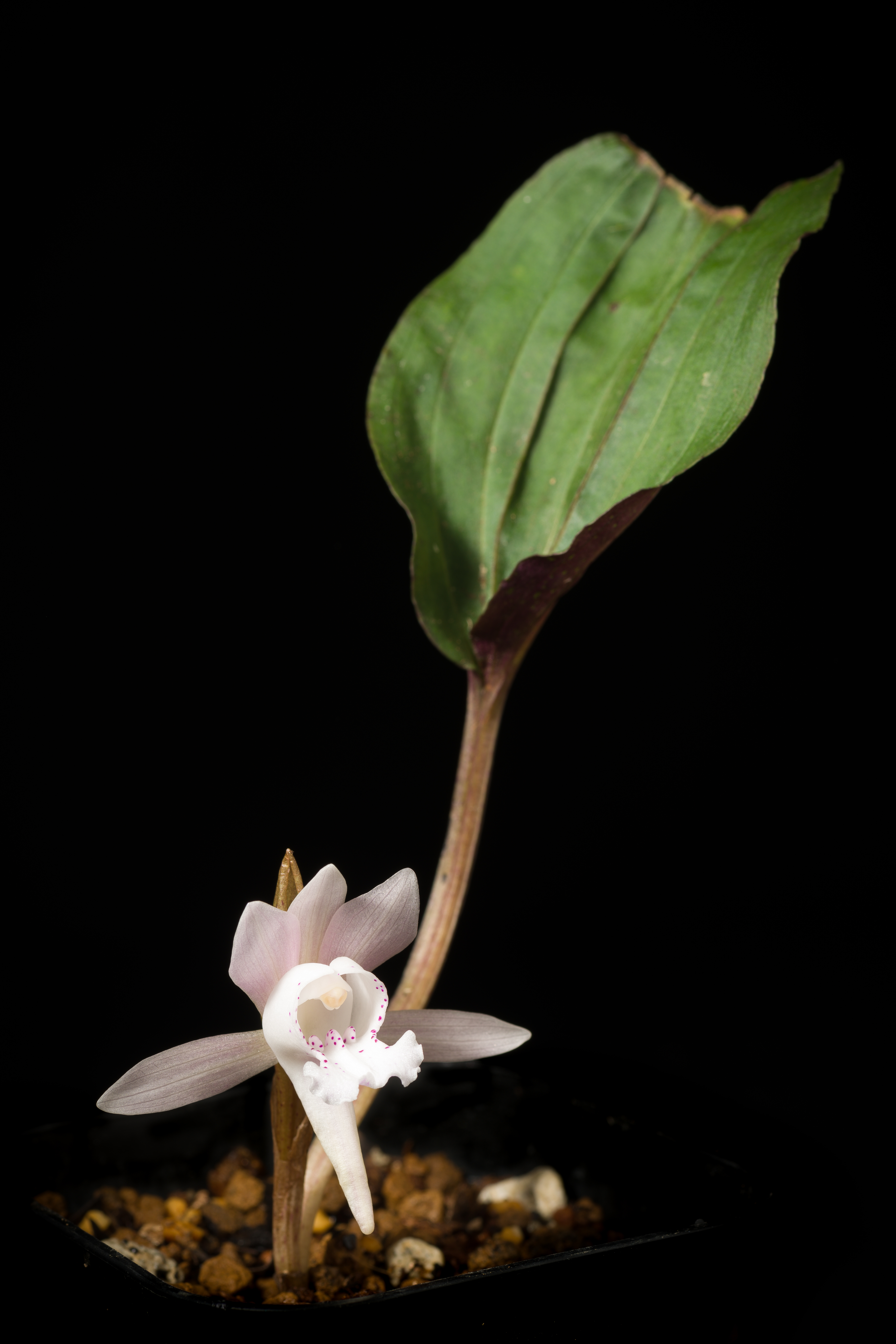
Changnienia

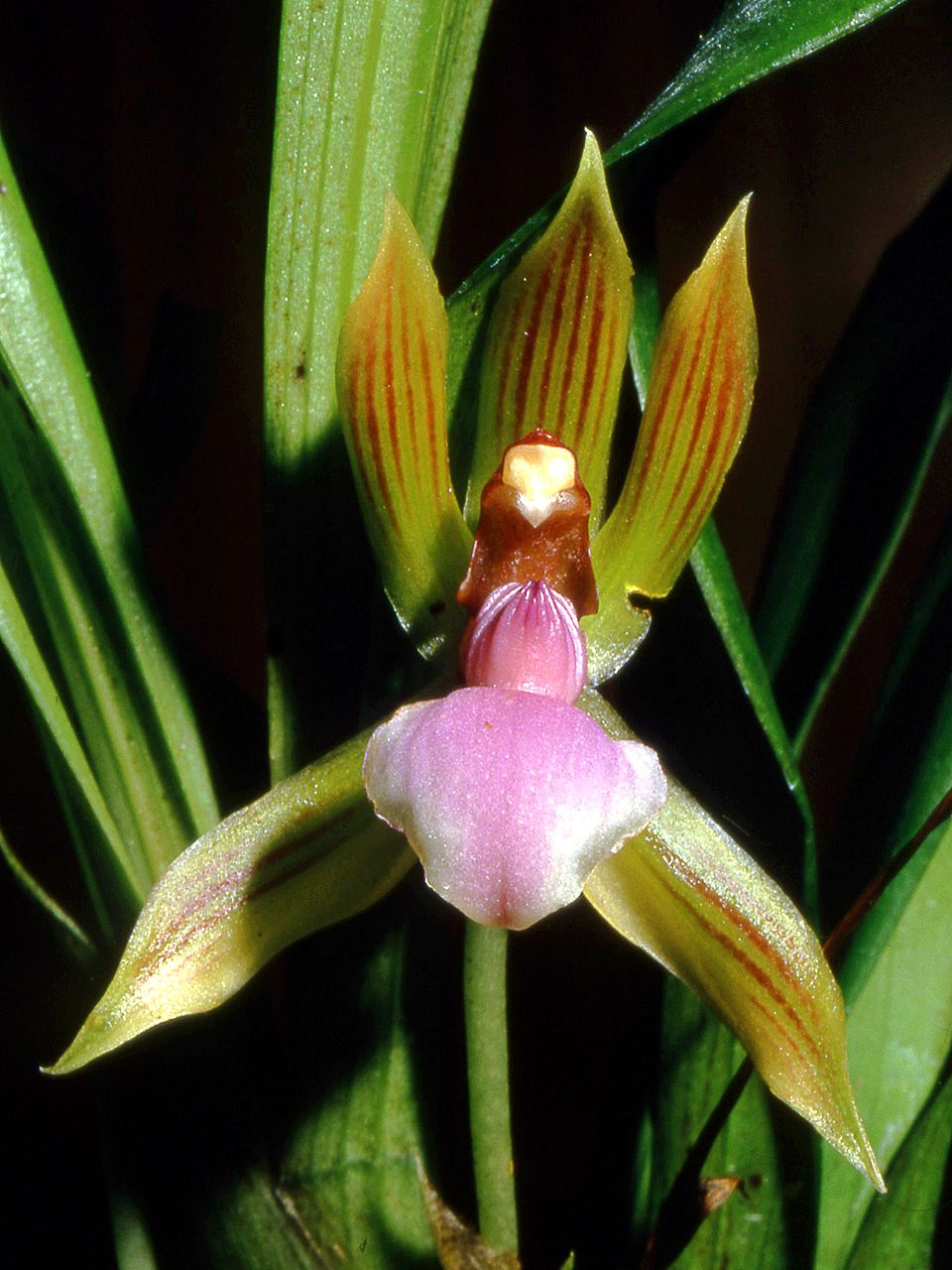
Chaubardia

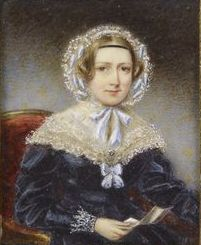
Charlotte Percy, Duchess of Northumberland

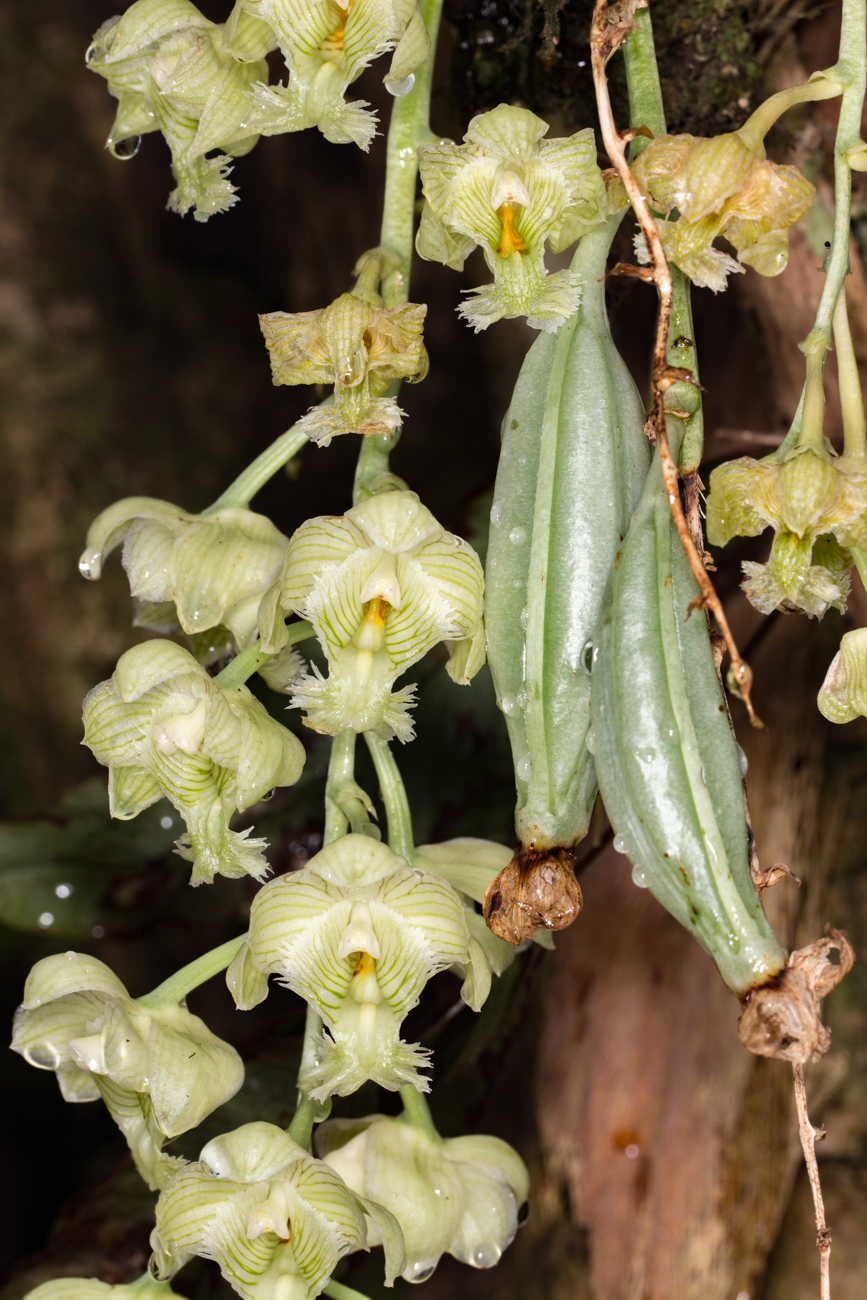
Clowesia

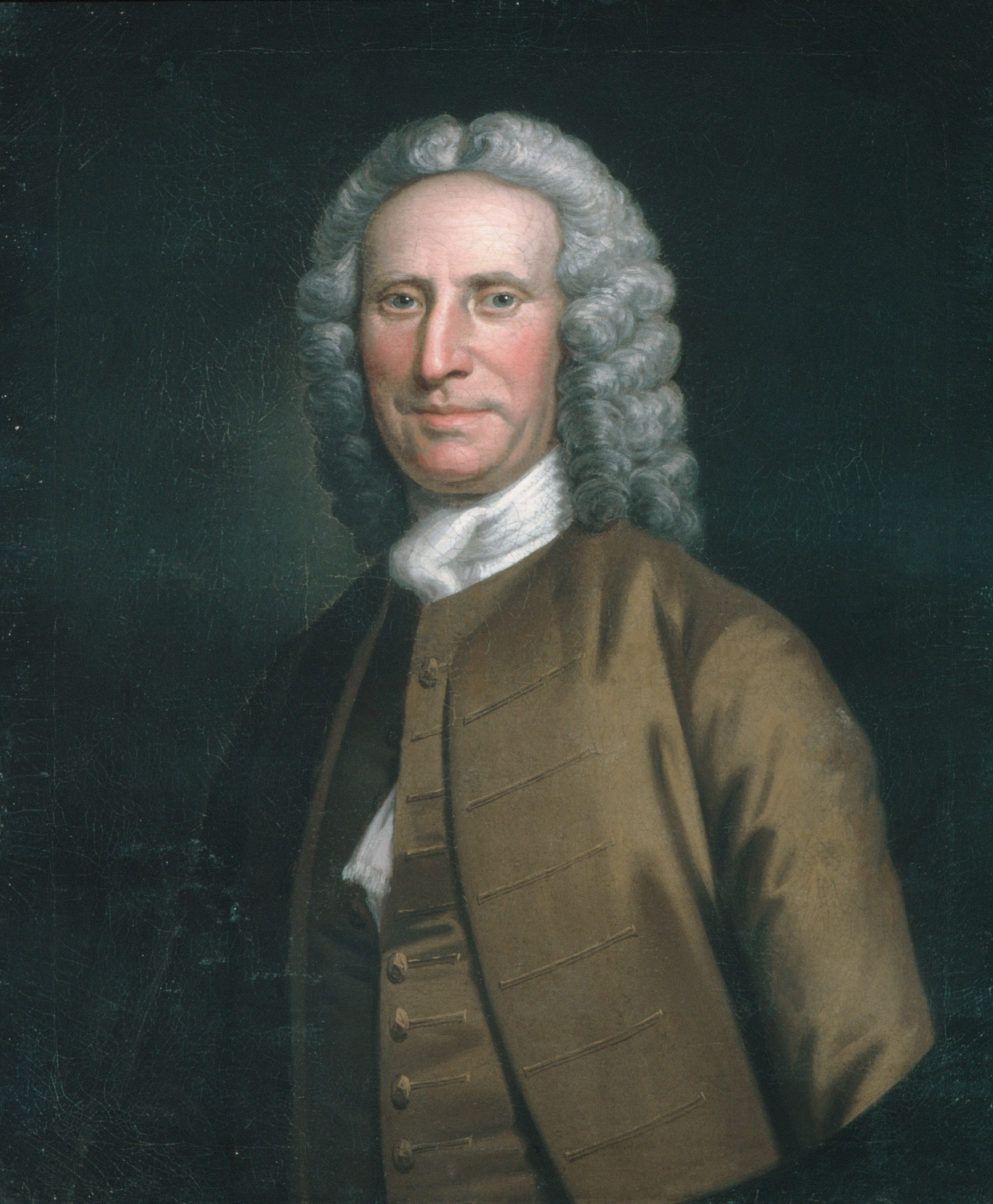
Cadwallader Colden

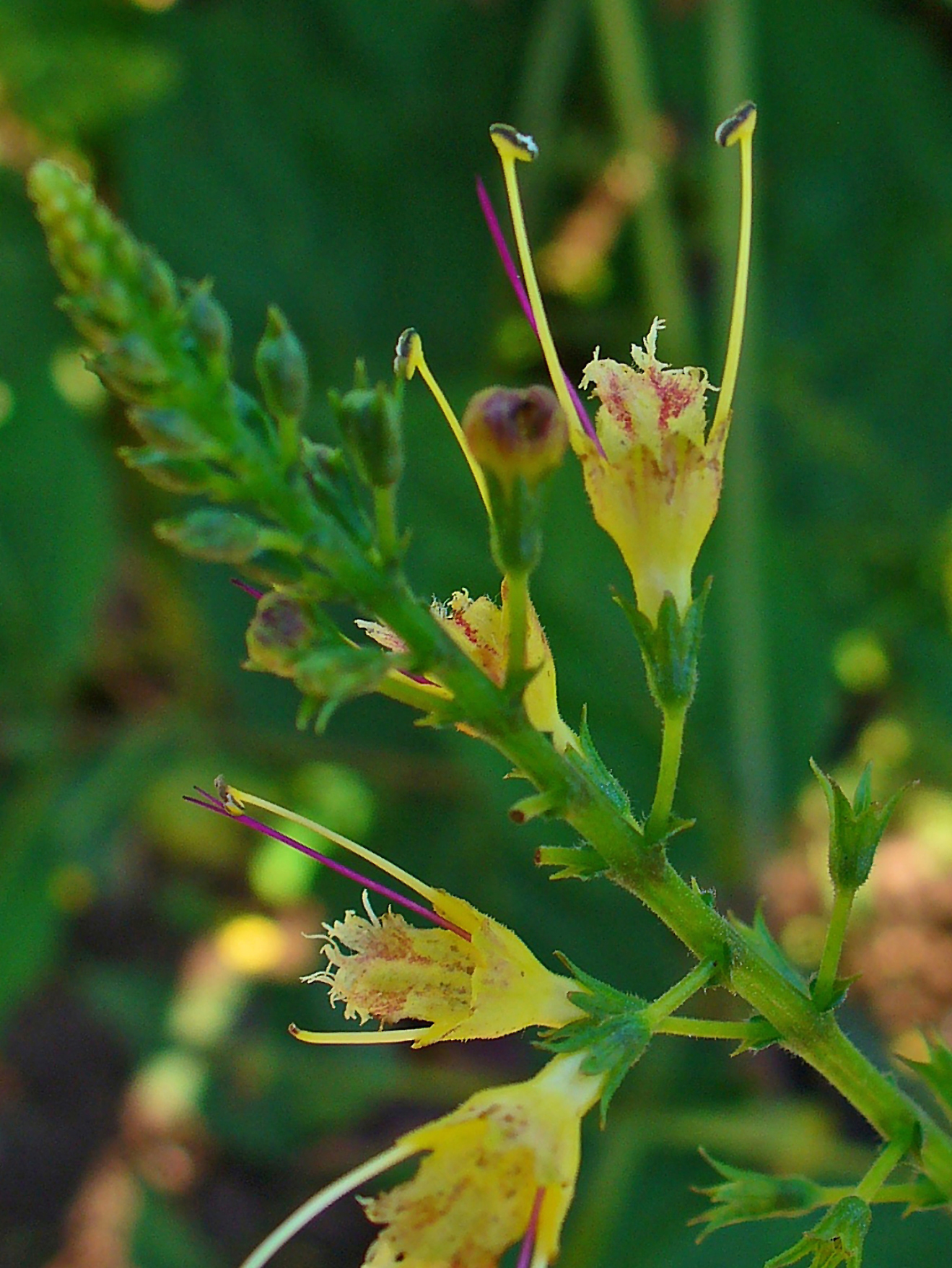
Collinsonia

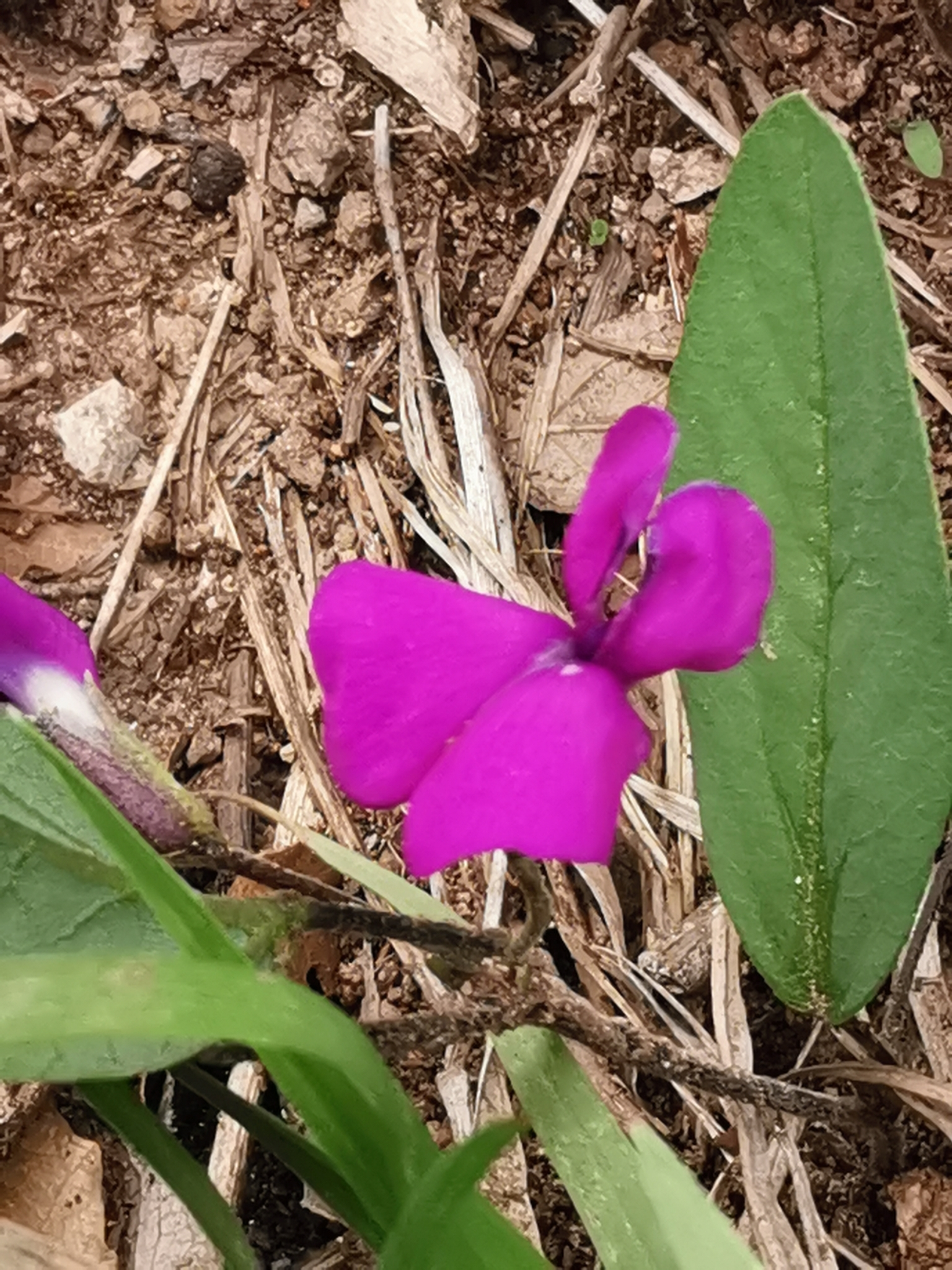
Cologania

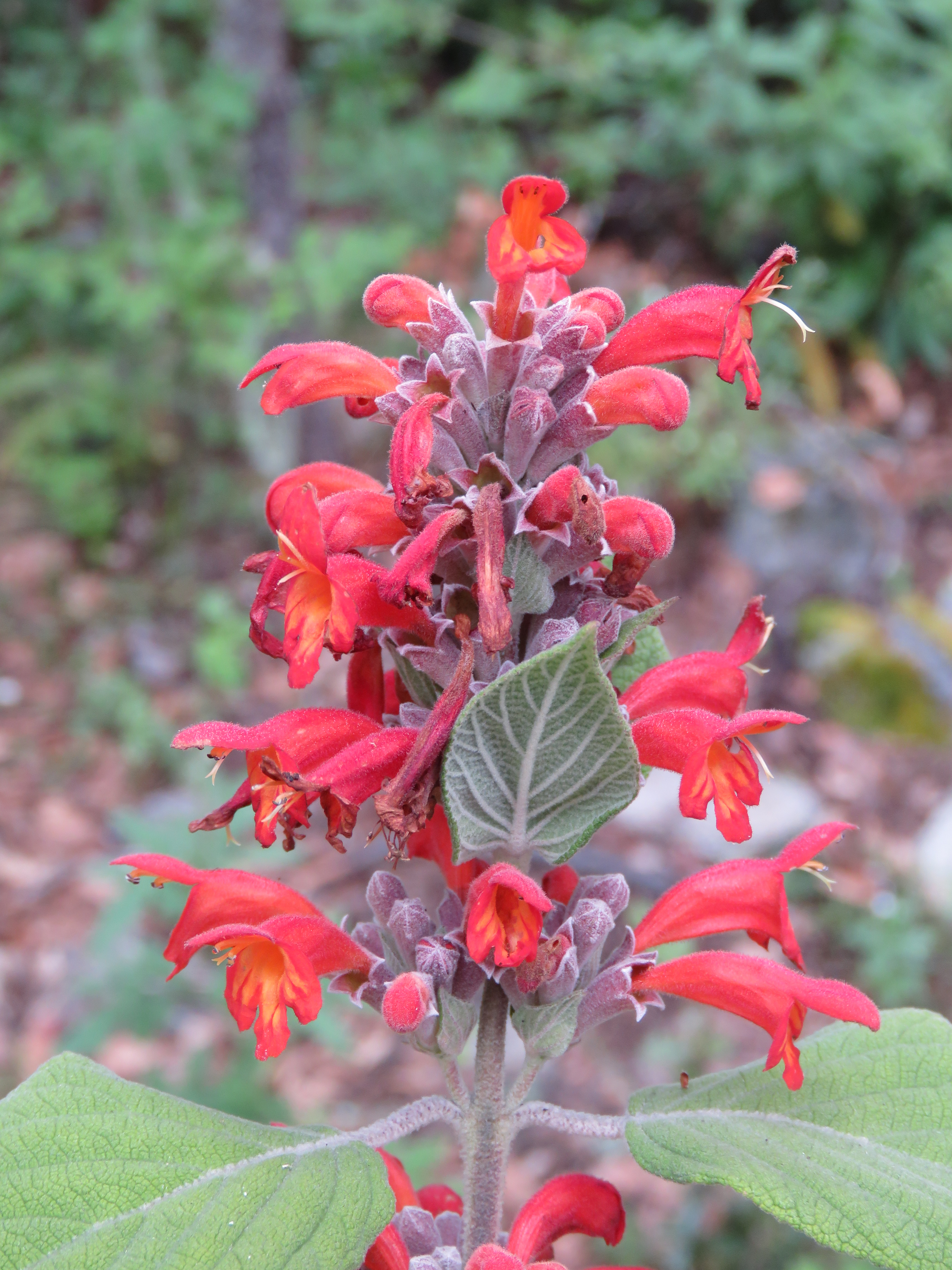
Colquhounia

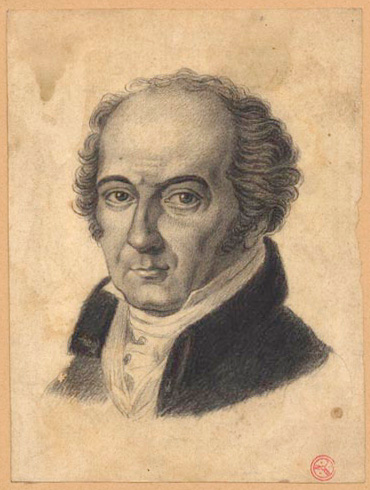
José Correia da Serra

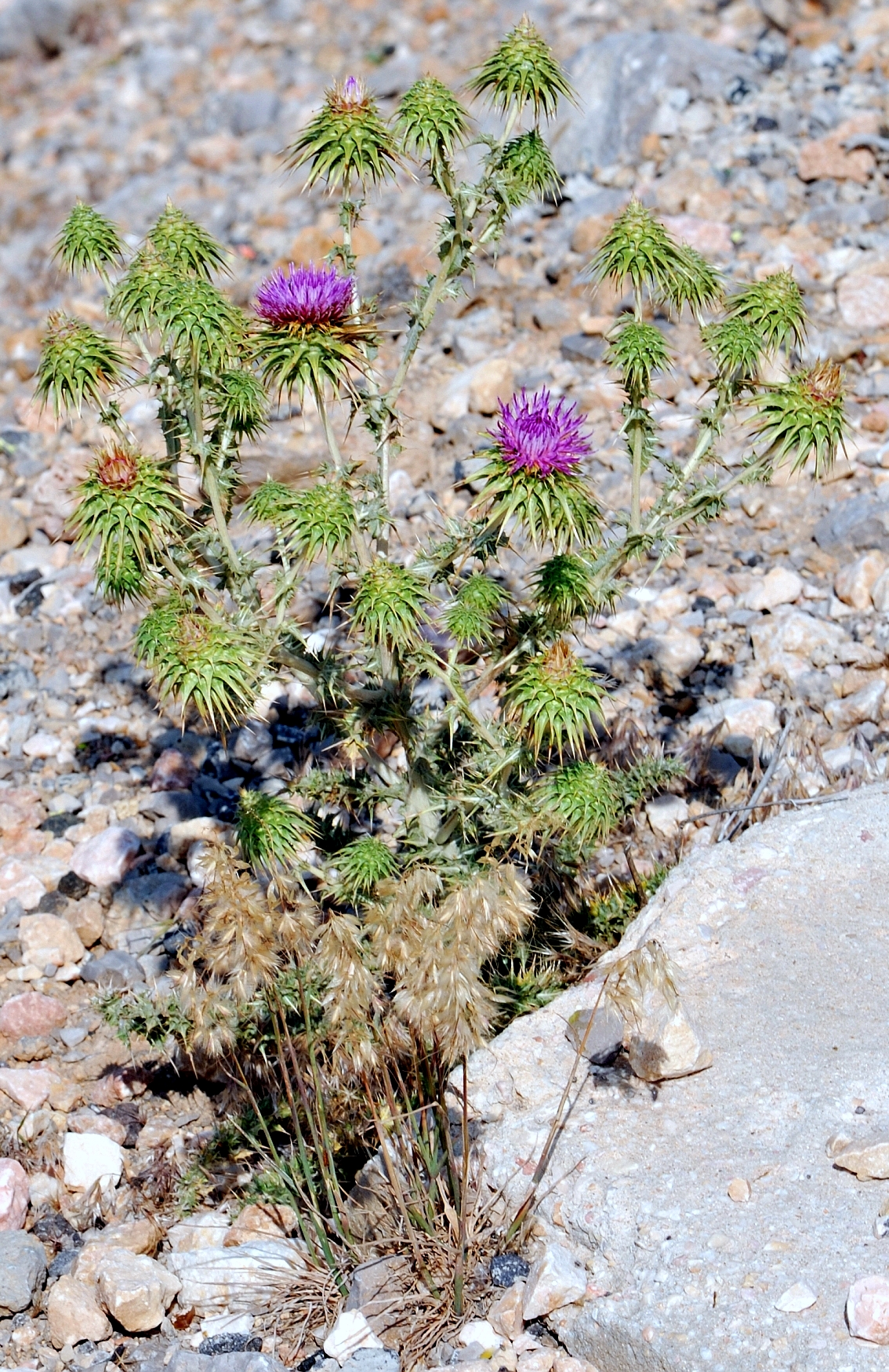
Cousinia

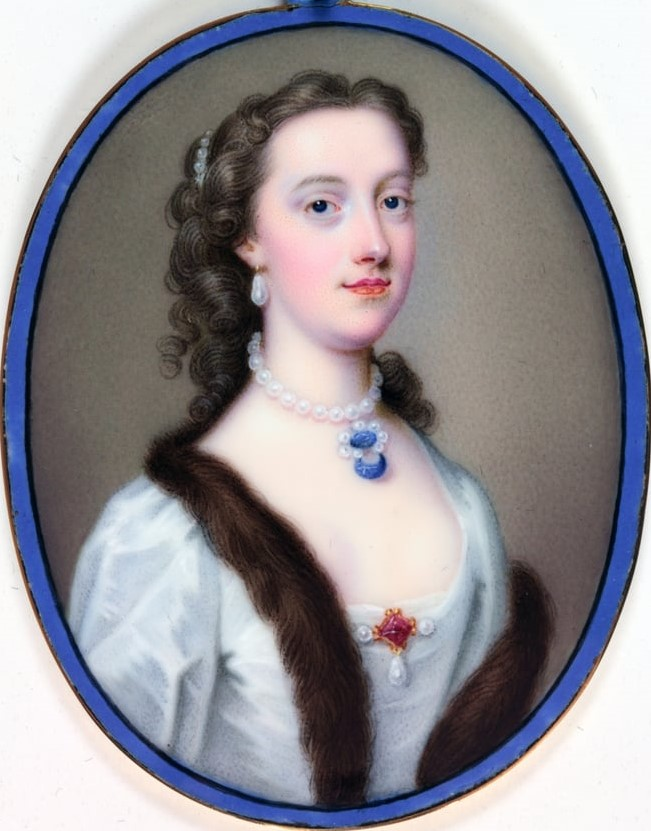
Margaret Bentinck, Duchess of Portland

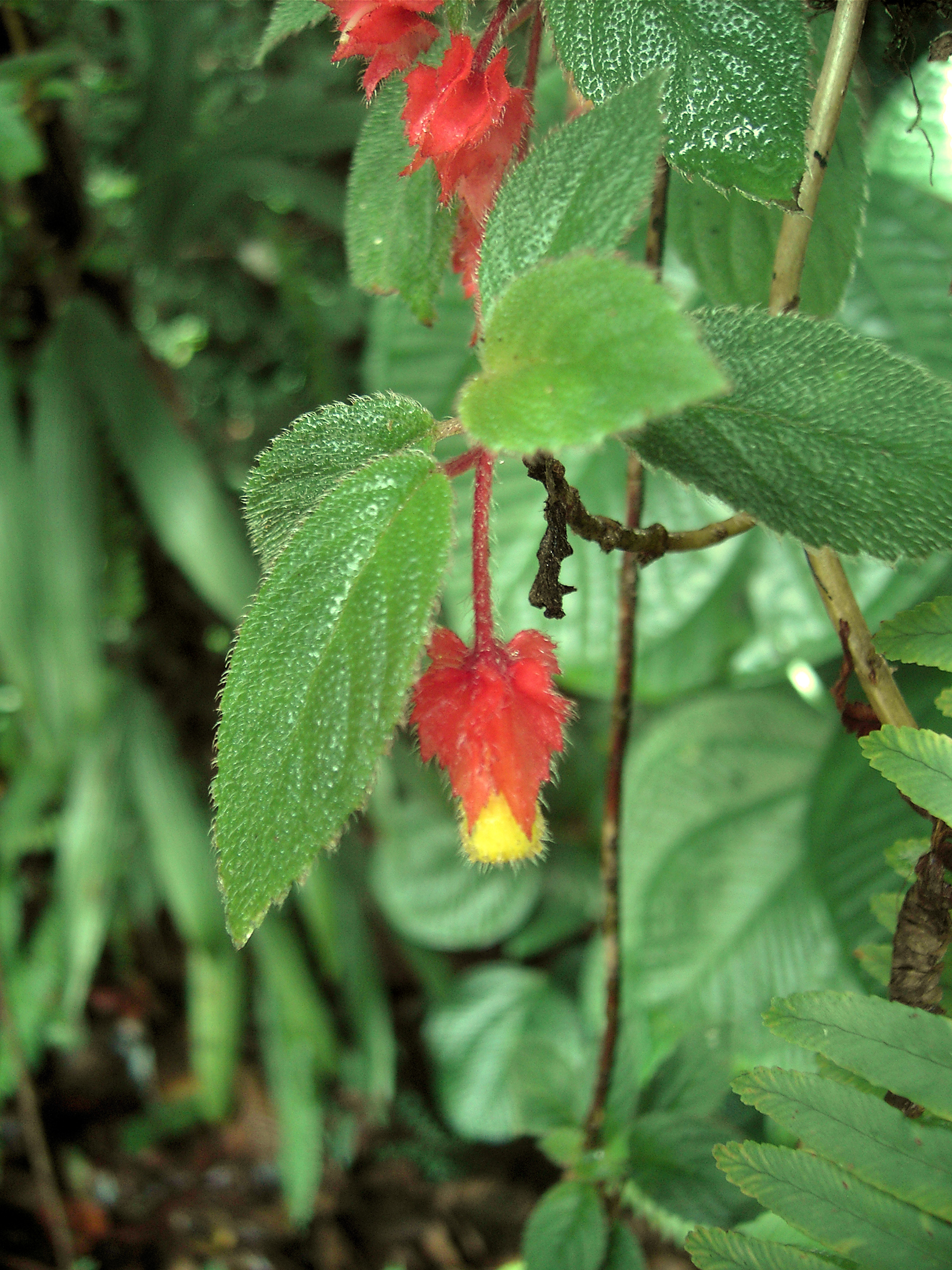
Crantzia

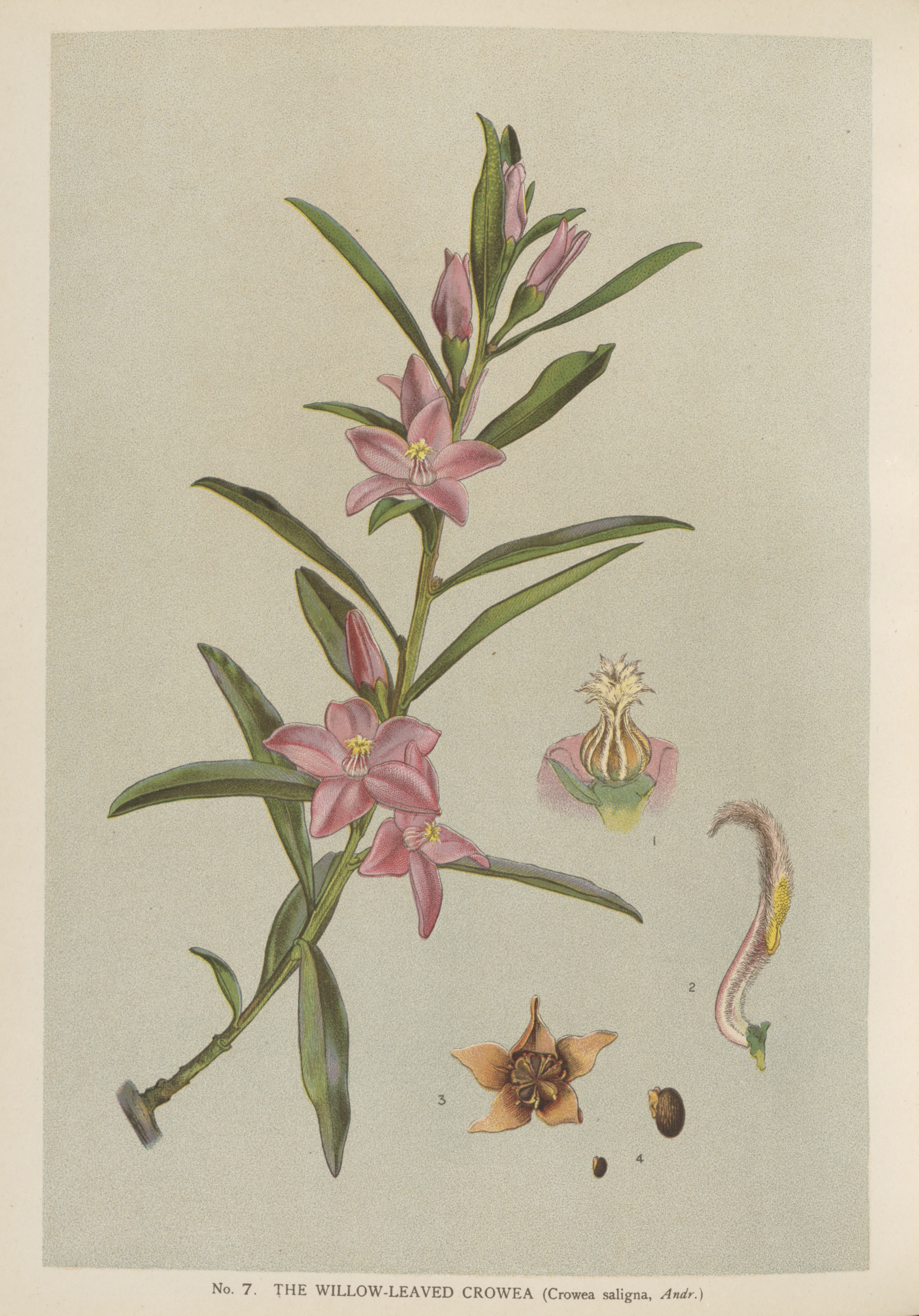
Crowea saligna

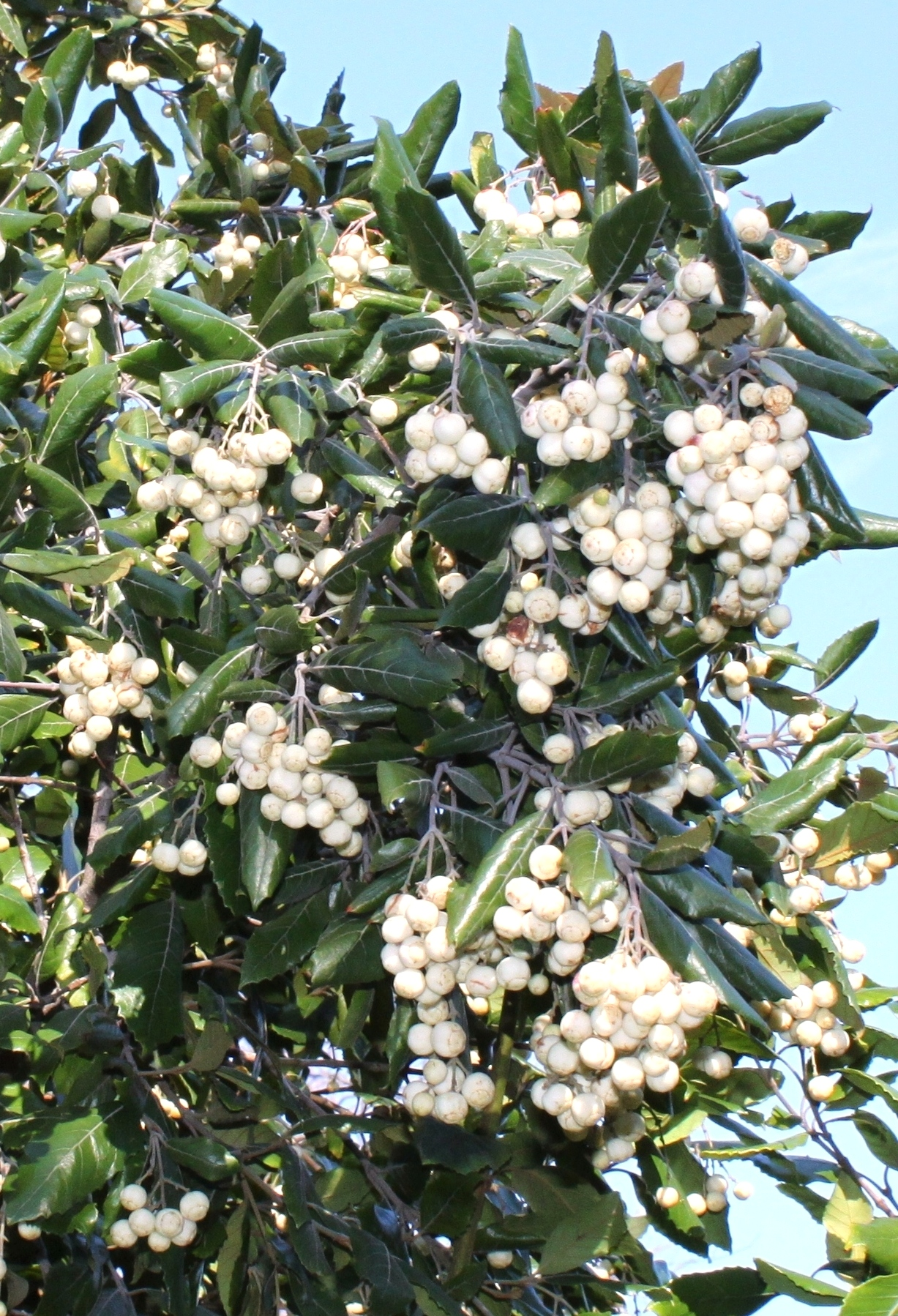
Curtisia

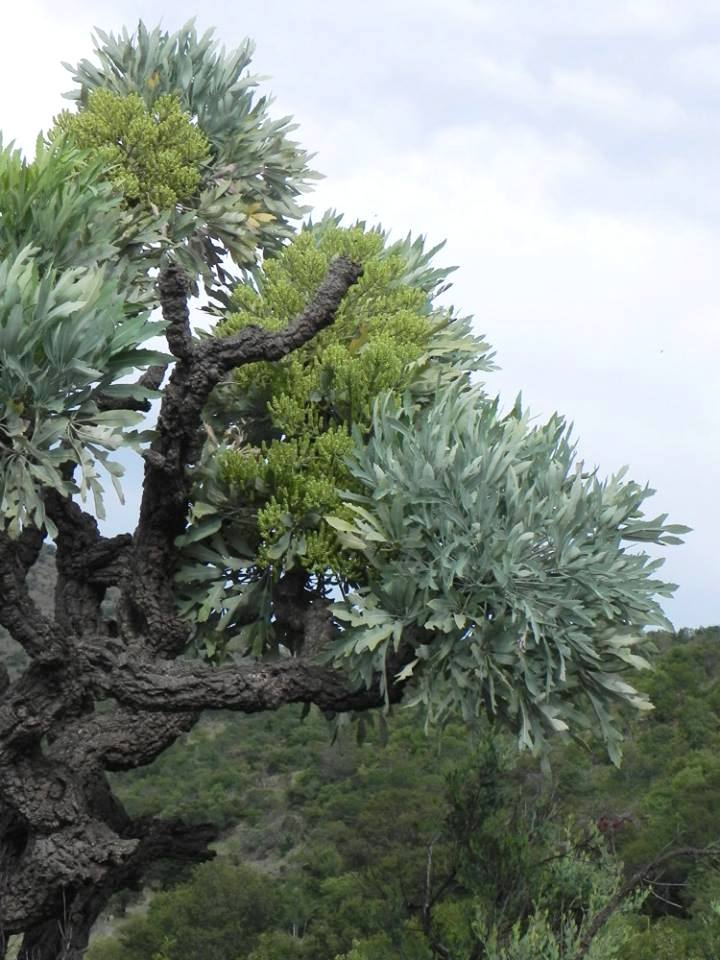
Cussonia

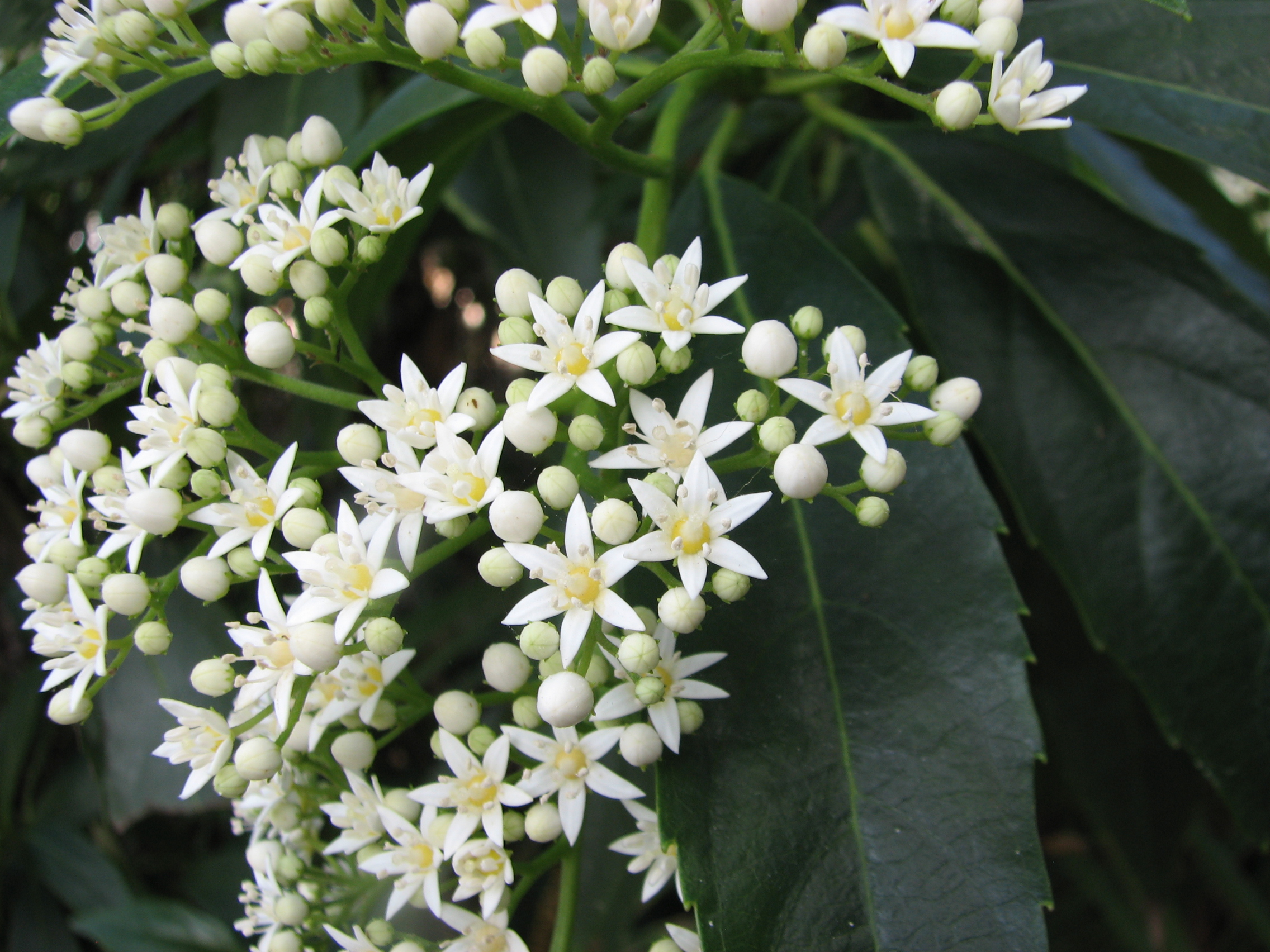
Cuttsia

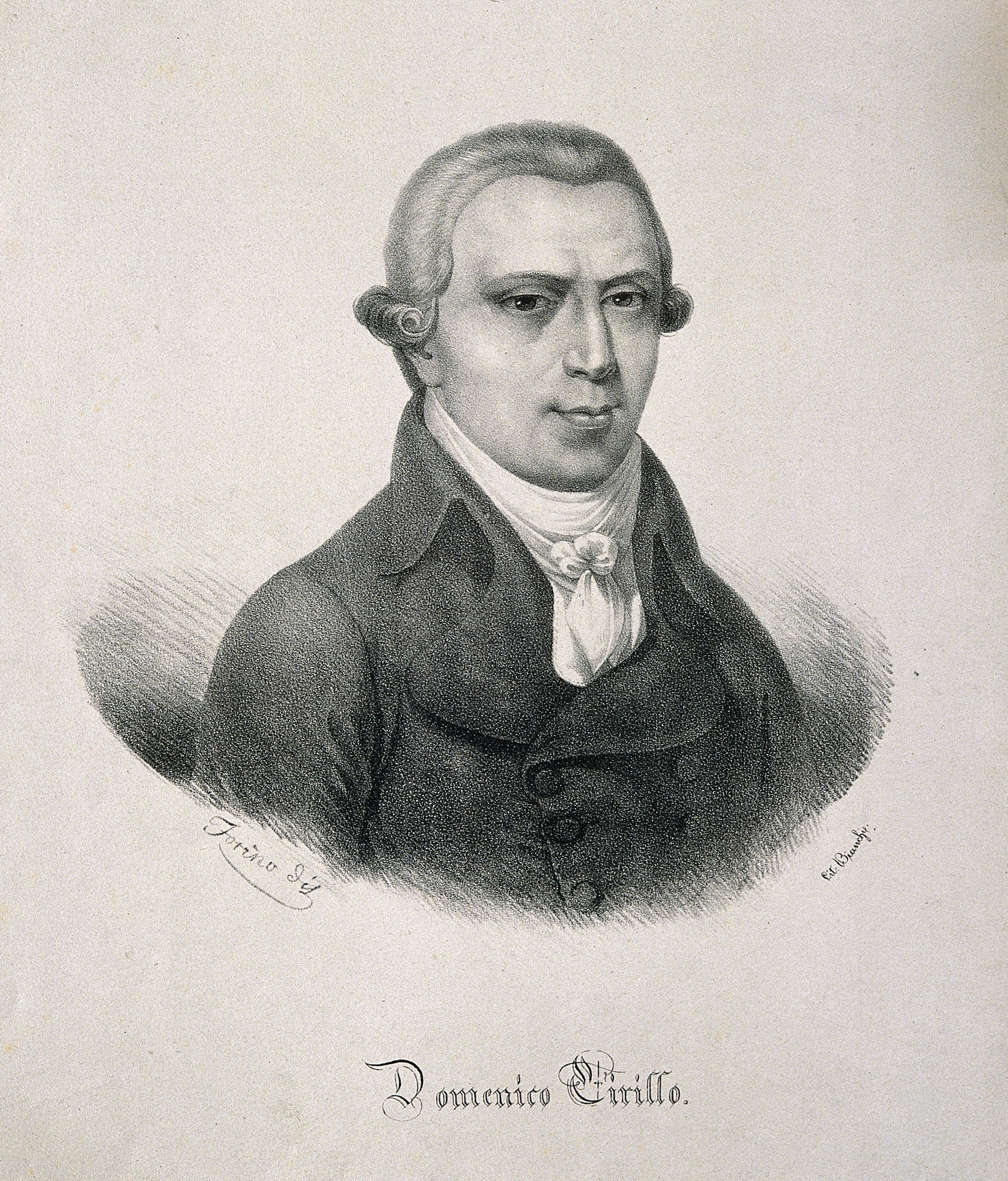
Domenico Cirillo

Genera
| Genus (Note: Page numbers for references are omitted, since all the references list genera alphabetically except for Plants of the World, which is mainly cited for genera that match their family names.) | Person honored (Note: Except for the people with an indication in their name or description that they were known for something else, all are remembered for their work as naturalists, including amateur and professional botanists, mycologists, zoologists, apothecaries, geologists, geographers and meteorologists.) | Plant family | Ref |
|---|---|---|---|
| Aa | Karl vom Stein zum Altenstein (1770–1840), politician (Note: The species of this genus were previously included in Altensteinia.) | Orchidaceae | Bu |
| Aaronsohnia | Aaron Aaronsohn (1876–1919) | Asteraceae | Bu |
| Abatia | Pedro Abad y Mestre (1747–1800), Spanish apothecary and professor of botany in Seville | Salicaceae | Bu |
| Abeliophyllum | Clarke Abel (1789 - 1826), surgeon and naturalist. | Oleaceae | Bt |
| Acharia | Erik Acharius (1757–1819) | Achariaceae | Bu |
| Acostia | Misael Acosta Solís (1910–1994) | Poaceae | Bu |
| Acourtia | Mary Elizabeth Catherine Gibbs à Court-Repington (1792–1878), English noblewoman with botanical interests; married Charles Ashe à Court-Repington | Asteraceae | Bu |
| Acunaeanthus | Julián Acuña Galé (1900–1973) | Rubiaceae | Bu |
| Adansonia | Michel Adanson (1727–1806) | Malvaceae | St |
| Adelinia | Adeline Etta Cohen (b. 2014), daughter of the American author of the plant, James I. Cohen | Boraginaceae | Bt |
| Adelmeria | Adolph Daniel Edward Elmer (1870–1942) | Zingiberaceae | Bu |
| Adlumia | John Adlum (1759–1836) | Papaveraceae | St |
| Adolphia | Adolphe-Théodore Brongniart (1801–1876) | Rhamnaceae | Bu |
| Adriana | Adrien-Henri de Jussieu (1797–1853) | Euphorbiaceae | Bu |
| Aeginetia | Paul of Aegina (c. 625 – c. 690), doctor | Orobanchaceae | Bu |
| Aenhenrya | Ambrose Nathaniel Henry (b. 1936), English naturalist with a focus on the flora of India | Orchidaceae | Bu |
| Afgekia | Arthur Francis George Kerr (1877–1942) | Fabaceae | Bu |
| Afrobrunnichia | Morten Thrane Brünnich (1737–1827) | Polygonaceae | Bu |
| Afrofittonia | Sarah Mary Fitton (c.1796–1874), and her sister Elizabeth Fitton | Acanthaceae | Bu |
| Afroguatteria | Giambattista Guatteri (1739–1793), Italian professor of botany in Parma | Annonaceae | Bu |
| Afrotrewia | Christoph Jacob Trew (1695–1769) | Euphorbiaceae | Bu |
| Afrotysonia | William Tyson (1851–1920), Jamaican-born South African teacher and plant collector | Boraginaceae | Bu |
| Afzelia | Adam Afzelius (1750–1837) | Fabaceae | Bu |
| Agarista | Agariste of Sicyon (fl. 6th century BC, around 560 BC), Greek daughter | Ericaceae | Bt |
| Agatea | Alfred Thomas Agate (1812–1846), painter and illustrator | Violaceae | Bu |
| Agiortia | Despina (Fanias) Agioritis (1927–1994), Australian botanist from Innisfail, Queensland | Ericaceae | Bu |
| Agnesia | Mary Agnes Chase (1869–1963) | Poaceae | Bu |
| Aguiaria | Brás de Aguiar (1881–1947), Brazilian naval officer who supported the author of the genus, Adolpho Ducke | Malvaceae | Bu |
| Ahernia | George Patrick Ahern (1859–1940), American forester and botanist who served in the military in Cuba and the Philippines; namesake of Ahern Peak | Achariaceae | Qu |
| Ainsliaea | Whitelaw Ainslie (1767–1837) | Asteraceae | Bu |
| Airyantha | Herbert Kenneth Airy Shaw (1902–1985) | Fabaceae | Bu |
| Akeassia | Laurent Aké Assi (1931–2014), Ivorian professor of botany in Abidjan; founded a botanical garden in Cocody | Asteraceae | Bu |
| Akrosida | Antonio Krapovickas (1921–2015) | Malvaceae | Bu |
| Akschindlium | Anton Karl Schindler (1879–1964) | Fabaceae | Bu |
| Alamania | Lucas Alamán (1792–1853), politician | Orchidaceae | Bu |
| Alania | Allan Cunningham (1791–1839) | Boryaceae | Bu |
| Alberta | Albertus Magnus (c.1200–1280), saint | Rubiaceae | Bu |
| Albertinia | Johannes Baptista von Albertini (1769–1831) | Asteraceae | Bu |
| Albertisia | Luigi D'Albertis (1841–1901) | Menispermaceae | Bu |
| Albidella | anagram of Baldellia, after Bartolomeo Bartolini-Baldelli (1804–1868), Italian nobleman; close advisor to Leopold II, Grand Duke of Tuscany, in Florence | Alismataceae | Bu |
| Albizia | Filippo del Albizzi (of the 18th-century Albizzis in Florence, Italy) | Fabaceae | Co |
| Albraunia | Alexander Braun (1805–1877) | Plantaginaceae | Bu |
| Alcantarea | Pedro II of Brazil (1825–1891) | Bromeliaceae | Bu |
| Alchornea | Stanesby Alchorne (1727–1800), English botanist at the Chelsea Physic Garden | Euphorbiaceae | Qu |
| Alchorneopsis | Stanesby Alchorne (1727–1800), English botanist at the Chelsea Physic Garden | Euphorbiaceae | Bu |
| Aldama | Ignacio Aldama (1769–1811), Mexican lawyer | Asteraceae | Bu |
| Aldina | Tobia Aldino (16th–17th century), Italian doctor and botanist; in charge of the medicinal garden of Cardinal Odoardo Farnese | Fabaceae | Bu |
| Aldrovanda | Ulisse Aldrovandi (1522–1605) | Droseraceae | St |
| Alexa | Alexandra Feodorovna (Charlotte of Prussia) (1798–1860) | Fabaceae | Bu |
| Alexfloydia | Alexander Floyd (b. 1926) | Poaceae | Bu |
| Alexgeorgea | Alex George (b. 1939) | Restionaceae | Bu |
| Alfaroa | Anastasio Alfaro (1865–1951) | Juglandaceae | Bu |
| Alfredia | Alfred of Sareshel (12th C.), translator | Asteraceae | Bu |
| Algernonia | Hugh Algernon Weddell (1819–1877) | Euphorbiaceae | Bu |
| Algrizea | Graziela Maciel Barroso (1912–2003) | Myrtaceae | Bu |
| Alibertia | Jean-Louis-Marc Alibert (1768–1837), doctor | Rubiaceae | Bu |
| Alicia | Alicia Lourteig (1913–2003) | Malpighiaceae | Bu |
| Aliciella | Alice Eastwood (1859–1953), curator of the botanical collection of the California Academy of Sciences | Polemoniaceae | Bu |
| Aliella | Syed Irtifaq Ali (b. 1930), Pakistani professor of botany in Karachi | Asteraceae | Bu |
| Allamanda | Frédéric-Louis Allamand (1736–1809) | Apocynaceae | Co |
| Allanblackia | Allan Black (1832−1865) | Clusiaceae | Bu |
| Allardia | Jean-François Allard (1785–1839), military officer | Asteraceae | Bu |
| Alleizettella | Aymar Charles d'Alleizette (1884–1967) | Rubiaceae | Bu |
| Allenrolfea | Robert Allen Rolfe (1855–1921) | Amaranthaceae | Bu |
| Allionia | Carlo Allioni (1728–1804) | Nyctaginaceae | St |
| Allittia | William Allitt (1828–1893), Irish-born Australian botanical curator in Queensland | Asteraceae | Bu |
| Allmania | William Allman (1776–1846) | Amaranthaceae | Bu |
| Allmaniopsis | William Allman (1776–1846) | Amaranthaceae | Bu |
| Allomarkgrafia | Friedrich Markgraf (1897–1987) | Apocynaceae | Bu |
| Allowoodsonia | Robert Everard Woodson (1904–1963) | Apocynaceae | Bu |
| Alluaudia | Charles A. Alluaud (1861–1949) | Didiereaceae | Bu |
| Alluaudiopsis | Charles A. Alluaud (1861–1949) | Didiereaceae | Bu |
| Almaleea | Alma Theodora Lee (1912–1990) | Fabaceae | Bu |
| Almutaster | Almut Gitter Jones (1923–2013) | Asteraceae | Bu |
| Alonsoa | Zenón Alonso (1756–1812), Spanish official in Bogotá | Scrophulariaceae | St |
| Aloysia | Maria Luisa of Parma | Verbenaceae | Co |
| Alphandia | Adolphe Alphand (1817–1891), engineer | Euphorbiaceae | Bu |
| Alphonsea | Alphonse Pyramus de Candolle (1806–1893) | Annonaceae | Bu |
| Alpinia | Prospero Alpini (1553–1617) | Zingiberaceae | Co |
| Alrawia | Ali Al-Rawi (fl. 1955–1987), Iraqi botanist in charge of the national herbarium in Baghdad | Asparagaceae | Bu |
| Alshehbazia | Ihsan Ali Al-Shehbaz (b.1939), Iraqi American botanist | Brassicaceae | Bt |
| Alstonia | Charles Alston (1683–1760) | Apocynaceae | St |
| Alstroemeria | Clas Alströmer (1736–1794) | Alstroemeriaceae | Ch |
| Altensteinia | Karl vom Stein zum Altenstein (1770–1840), educator | Orchidaceae | Bu |
| Althenia | Jean Althen (1709–1774) | Potamogetonaceae | Bu |
| Alvaradoa | Pedro de Alvarado (c. 1485–1541), conquistador | Picramniaceae | Bu |
| Alvesia | Bento Antonio Alves (c.1796–1878), a Portuguese gardener who accompanied the author of this genus, Friedrich Welwitsch, on botanical excursions | Lamiaceae | Bu |
| Alvimiantha | Paulo de Tarso Alvim (1919–2011) | Rhamnaceae | Bu |
| Alzatea | José Antonio de Alzate y Ramírez (1737–1799) | Alzateaceae | Ch |
| Amasonia | George Anson, 1st Baron Anson (1697–1762) | Lamiaceae | Bu |
| Ambrosina | Bartolomeo Ambrosini (1588–1657) | Araceae | Bu |
| Ameghinoa | Carlos Ameghino (1865–1936) | Asteraceae | Bu |
| Amelichloa | María Amelia Torres (1934–2011), Argentinian botanist, lecturer and curator of the Herbarium of the National University of La Plata | Poaceaes | Bt |
| Amesiella | Oakes Ames (1874–1950) | Orchidaceae | Bu |
| Amesiodendron | Oakes Ames (1874–1950) | Sapindaceae | Bu |
| Amherstia | Sarah Amherst (1762–1838) | Fabaceae | St |
| Amicia | Giovanni Battista Amici (1786–1863) | Fabaceae | St |
| Ammannia | Paul Amman (1634–1691) | Lythraceae | Bu |
| Amolinia | José Antonio Molina Rosito (1926–2020) | Asteraceae | Bu |
| Amorimia | André M. Amorim (b. 1966), Brazilian botanist and Malpighiaceae specialist | Malpighiaceae | Bu |
| Amperea | André-Marie Ampère (1775–1836), physicist | Euphorbiaceae | Bu |
| Amsinckia | Wilhelm Amsinck (1752–1831), head of state of Hamburg; botanical patron | Boraginaceae | Qu |
| Amsonia | John (or Charles) Amson, 18th-century physician and botanist | Apocynaceae | Co |
| Anaxagorea | Anaxagoras (c.500–c.428 BC), philosopher | Annonaceae | Bu |
| Anchietea | Joseph of Anchieta (1534–1597) | Violaceae | Bu |
| Anderbergia | Arne A. Anderberg (b. 1954), professor of botany at the Swedish Museum of Natural History in Stockholm; Asteraceae specialist | Asteraceae | Bu |
| Andersonia | William Anderson, William Anderson and Alexander Anderson | Ericaceae | Bu |
| Andersonglossum | William Russell Anderson (1942–2013), American botanist; director of the New York Botanical Garden Herbarium | Boraginaceae | Bt |
| Andradea | José Bonifácio de Andrada (1763–1838) | Nyctaginaceae | Bu |
| Andreadoxa | André Maurício Vieira de Carvalho (1951–2002), Brazilian curator at the Bahia herbarium; specialist in that state's flora | Rutaceae | Bu |
| Andriana | Andriantsimitoviaminandriandehibe (died c.1670), king | Apiaceae | Bu |
| Andrzeiowskia | Antoni Andrzejowski (1784 or 1785 –1868) | Brassicaceae | Bu |
| Anelsonia | Aven Nelson (1859–1952) | Brassicaceae | Bu |
| Angeldiazia | Angel Diaz Celis, Peruvian botanist; university rector in the 1980s | Asteraceae | Bu |
| Anguloa | Francisco de Angulo, (d. 1815) General Prefect of Mines of Spain. Botanist. | Orchidaceae | St |
| Annesijoa | John VI of Portugal (1767–1826) | Euphorbiaceae | Bu |
| Anneslea | George Annesley, 2nd Earl of Mountnorris (1770–1844) | Pentaphylacaceae | Bu |
| Annickia | Annick Le Thomas (b. 1936), French botanist at the National Museum of Natural History | Annonaceae | Bu |
| Ansellia | John Ansell (d. 1847), British botanist | Orchidaceae | St |
| Antinoria | Vincenzo Antinori (1792–1865) | Poaceae | Bu |
| Antonia | Archduke Anton Victor of Austria (1779–1835) | Loganiaceae | Bu |
| Antopetitia | Antoine Petit (d. 1843), French doctor and naturalist from Paris; travelled in the Ethiopian Empire | Fabaceae | Qu |
| Anvillea | Jean-Baptiste Bourguignon d'Anville (1697–1782) | Asteraceae | Bu |
| Appertiella | Otto Appert (1930–2012), Swiss clergyman and paleontologist; missionary in Madagascar | Hydrocharitaceae | Bu |
| Apuleia | Apuleius (c.124 – c.170), philosopher and writer | Fabaceae | Bu |
| Aragoa | François Arago (1786–1853) | Plantaginaceae | Bu |
| Araujia | António de Araújo e Azevedo, 1st Count of Barca (1754–1817) | Apocynaceae | Co |
| Arbelaezaster | Enrique Pérez Arbeláez (1896–1972), Colombian clergyman and botanist who founded the Bogotá Botanical Garden | Asteraceae | Bu |
| Arberella | Agnes Arber (1879–1960) | Poaceae | Bu |
| Arboa | María Mercedes Arbo (b. 1945), Argentine botanist, curator, professor and explorer | Passifloraceae | Bt |
| Arcangelisia | Giovanni Arcangeli (1840–1921) | Menispermaceae | Bu |
| Archboldiodendron | Richard Archbold (1907–1976) | Theaceae | Bu |
| Archeria | William Archer (1820–1874) | Ericaceae | Bu |
| Archytaea | Archytas (435/410 – 360/350), philosopher and scientist | Bonnetiaceae | Bu |
| Arcoa | Georg von Arco (1869–1940), physicist | Fabaceae | Bu |
| Arfeuillea | Charles Hippolyte Marie Mourin d'Arfeuille (1837–1909), French naval officer who mapped and described a region of the Mekong River | Sapindaceae | Bu |
| Argomuellera | Johannes Müller Argoviensis (1828–1896) | Euphorbiaceae | Bu |
| Argylia | Archibald Campbell, 3rd Duke of Argyll (1682–1761) | Bignoniaceae | Bu |
| Aristeguietia | Leandro Aristeguieta (1923–2012), Venezuelan botanist (dendrologist); professor in Caracas | Asteraceae | Qu |
| Aristotelia | Aristotle (384–322 BC), polymath | Elaeocarpaceae | Co |
| Arjona | Francisco Arjona (18th century), Spanish botanist who taught in Cádiz around 1797 | Schoepfiaceae | Qu |
| Arnaldoa | Arnaldo López Miranda (1922–2010), Peruvian botanist and professor at the National University of Trujillo | Asteraceae | Bu |
| Arrojadoa | Miguel Arrojado Lisboa (1872–1932), Brazilian engineer and geologist | Cactaceae | Qu |
| Arrojadocharis | Miguel Arrojado Lisboa (1872–1932), Brazilian engineer and geologist | Asteraceae | Bu |
| Arrowsmithia | John Arrowsmith (1790–1873) | Asteraceae | Bu |
| Artedia | Peter Artedi (1705–1735) | Apiaceae | Bu |
| Arundoclaytonia | William Derek Clayton (b. 1926), English botanist and agronomist; taxonomist at Kew Gardens | Poaceae | Bu |
| Aschersoniodoxa | Paul Friedrich August Ascherson (1834–1913) | Brassicaceae | Bu |
| Ashtonia | Peter Shaw Ashton (born 27 June 1934) | Phyllanthaceae | Bu |
| Askellia | Áskell Löve (1916–1994) | Asteraceae | Bu |
| Aspasia | probably Aspasia, intellectual | Orchidaceae | St |
| Asplundia | Erik Asplund (1888–1974), Swedish botanist and professor in Uppsala | Cyclanthaceae | Qu |
| Asplundianthus | Erik Asplund (1888–1974), Swedish botanist and professor in Uppsala | Asteraceae | Bu |
| Astiella | Suzanne Jovet-Ast (1914–2006) | Rubiaceae | Bu |
| Astonia | Helen Isobel Aston (1934–2020) | Alismataceae | Bu |
| Astridia | Astrid Elise (Wilberg) Schwantes (1887–1960); her connection to the genus is unclear. Married to the German botanist and archeologist Martin Heinrich Gustav Schwantes. | Aizoaceae | Qu |
| Athertonia | John Atherton (1837–1913), and the Atherton Tableland | Proteaceae | Bu |
| Atkinsonia | Louisa Atkinson (1834–1872) | Loranthaceae | Bu |
| Attilaea | Attila Borhidi (b. 1932) | Anacardiaceae | Bu |
| Aubletiana | Jean Baptiste Christophore Fusée Aublet (1720–1778) | Euphorbiaceae | Bu |
| Aubregrinia | André Aubréville (1897–1982) and François Pellegrin (1881–1965) | Sapotaceae | Bu |
| Aubrevillea | André Aubréville (1897–1982) | Fabaceae | Bu |
| Aubrieta | Claude Aubriet (c.1665 or 1651 –1742) | Brassicaceae | Co |
| Aucklandia | George Eden, 1st Earl of Auckland (1784–1849) | Asteraceae | Bu |
| Audouinia | Jean Victor Audouin (1797–1841) | Bruniaceae | Bu |
| Auerodendron | Carl Auer von Welsbach (1858–1929), scientist | Rhamnaceae | Bu |
| Augouardia | Prosper Philippe Augouard (1852–1921), explorer and missionary | Fabaceae | Bu |
| Augusta | Caroline Augusta of Bavaria (1792–1873) | Rubiaceae | Bu |
| Augustea | August Grisebach (1814–1879) | Caryophyllaceae | Bu |
| Austrobaileya | Frederick Manson Bailey (1827–1915) and Irving Widmer Bailey (1884–1967) | Austrobaileyaceae | Ch |
| Austrobrickellia | John Brickell (1748–1809), Irish-born American doctor and botanist | Asteraceae | Bu |
| Austrocritonia | Criton of Heraclea (c. 100 AD) | Asteraceae | Bu |
| Austroeupatorium | Mithridates VI Eupator (135–63 BC) | Asteraceae | Bu |
| Austromatthaea | Matteo di San Giuseppe (1612–1691), Italian clergyman, doctor, botanist, and linguist | Monimiaceae | Bu |
| Austromuellera | Ferdinand von Mueller (1825–1896) | Proteaceae | Bu |
| Austrosteenisia | Cornelis Gijsbert Gerrit Jan van Steenis (1901–1986) | Fabaceae | Bu |
| Autranella | Victor Marius François Autran (1860–1927), French colonial administrator who collected plants in equatorial Africa | Sapotaceae | Bu |
| Avellinia | Giulio Avellino (fl. 1840–43), Italian botanist in Naples | Poaceae | Qu |
| Averrhoa | Averroes (1126–1198), polymath | Oxalidaceae | Ba |
| Averrhoidium | Averroes (1126–1198), polymath | Sapindaceae | Bu |
| Avicennia | Avicenna (c. 980 –1037) | Acanthaceae | Bu |
| Ayenia | Louis de Noailles (1713–1793), nobleman | Malvaceae | Bu |
| Ayensua (synonym of Brocchinia) | Edward S. Ayensu (b.1935) | Bromeliaceae | Bu |
| Azanza | Miguel José de Azanza, 1st Duke of Santa Fe (1746–1826) | Malvaceae | Bu |
| Azara | José Nicolás de Azara (1730–1804), diplomat | Salicaceae | Co |
| Babingtonia | Cardale Babington (1808–1895) | Myrtaceae | Bu |
| Bachmannia | Franz Ewald Theodor Bachmann (1856–1916) | Capparaceae | Bu |
| Backhousia | James Backhouse (1794–1869) | Myrtaceae | St |
| Badiera | Barthélémy de Badier (d. 1789), French collector of plants from Saint-Domingue and elsewhere | Polygalaceae | Bu |
| Badilloa | Víctor Manuel Badillo (1920–2008), Venezuelan botanist in Maracay at the agronomical herbarium of the Central University of Venezuela | Asteraceae | Qu |
| Baeckea | Abraham Bäck (1713–1795), Swedish botanist and royal personal physician | Myrtaceae | Ba |
| Baeriopsis | Karl Ernst von Baer (1792–1876) | Asteraceae | Bu |
| Bahiopsis | Juan Francisco de Bahí y Fonseca (1775–1841), Spanish military doctor; professor of botany in Barcelona | Asteraceae | Bu |
| Baikiaea | William Balfour Baikie (1825–1864) | Fabaceae | Bu |
| Baileya | Jacob Whitman Bailey (1811–1857) | Asteraceae | Bu |
| Baileyoxylon | Irving Widmer Bailey (1884–1967) | Achariaceae | Bu |
| Baillonella | Henri Ernest Baillon (1827–1895) | Sapotaceae | Bu |
| Baissea | Nicolas Sarrabat (1698–1739) | Apocynaceae | Bu |
| Bakerella | John Gilbert Baker (1834–1920) | Loranthaceae | Bu |
| Bakeridesia | Edmund Gilbert Baker (1864–1949) | Malvaceae | Bu |
| Balbisia | Giovanni Battista Balbis (1765–1831) | Francoaceae | Bu |
| Baldellia | Bartolomeo Bartolini-Baldelli (1804–1868), Italian nobleman; close advisor to Leopold II, Grand Duke of Tuscany, in Florence | Alismataceae | Qu |
| Balduina | William Baldwin (1779–1819) | Asteraceae | Bu |
| Balfourodendron | John Hutton Balfour (1808–1884) | Rutaceae | Bu |
| Balizia | Filippo del Albizzi (of the 18th-century Albizzis in Florence, Italy) | Fabaceae | Bu |
| Ballantinia | Mary (Ballantyne) Smith (fl. 1840s), British plant collector from New Norfolk in Australia | Brassicaceae | Qu |
| Ballochia | Robert Balloch (1825–1902), Scottish merchant from Glasgow; father-in-law of the author of the genus name | Acanthaceae | Bu |
| Ballyanthus | Peter René Oscar Bally (1895–1980) | Apocynaceae | Bu |
| Balmea | Juan Balme Giraud (1880–1964), French-born Mexican professor of horticulture; director of Chapultepec, a large urban park in Mexico City | Rubiaceae | Bu |
| Baloghia | József Balogh (1750–1781), doctor from Transylvania who wrote a dissertation on medically important plants | Euphorbiaceae | Qu |
| Baltimora | Frederick Calvert, 6th Baron Baltimore (1731–1771) | Asteraceae | Bu |
| Bambekea | Charles Eugène Marie van Bambeke (1829–1918), Belgian botanist (mycologist); doctor and professor in Ghent | Cucurbitaceae | Qu |
| Bampsia | Paul Rodolphe Joseph Bamps (b. 1932), Belgian botanist | Linderniaceae | Bu |
| Banisteriopsis | John Banister (1654–1692) | Malpighiaceae | Bu |
| Banksia | Joseph Banks (1743–1820) | Proteaceae | Co |
| Barbacenia | Luís António Furtado de Castro do Rio de Mendonça e Faro (1754–1830), governor of Minas Gerais in Brazil | Velloziaceae | Bu |
| Barbaceniopsis | Luís António Furtado de Castro do Rio de Mendonça e Faro (1754–1830), governor of Minas Gerais in Brazil | Velloziaceae | Bu |
| Barberetta | Mary Elizabeth Barber (1818–1899) | Haemodoraceae | Bu |
| Barbeuia | Jacques Barbeu-Dubourg (1709–1779) | Barbeuiaceae | Ch |
| Barbeya | William Barbey (1842–1914) | Barbeyaceae | Ch |
| Barbieria | Jean-Baptiste-Grégoire Barbier (1776–1855), French doctor, pharmacist and botanist in Amiens | Fabaceae | Bu |
| Barbosella | João Barbosa Rodrigues (1842–1909) | Orchidaceae | Bu |
| Barclaya | Robert Barclay (1757–1830), English botanist and horticulturalist | Nymphaeaceae | St |
| Bardotia | Martine Bardot-Vaucoulon (b. 1948), French teacher and botanist who was the first to collect this plant in Madagascar | Orobanchaceae | Bu |
| Barfussia | Michael Harald Johannes Barfuss (b. 1977), Austrian botanist; specialist in Bromeliaceae | Bromeliaceae | Bu |
| Barjonia | Barjon, a specialist in French Guianese plants | Apocynaceae | Bu |
| Barkeria | George Barker (1776–1845) | Orchidaceae | Bu |
| Barkleyanthus | Theodore Mitchell Barkley (1934–2004), American botanist; professor and curator at Kansas State University | Asteraceae | Bu |
| Barklya | Henry Barkly (1815–1898), colonial administrator | Fabaceae | St |
| Barleria | Jacques Barrelier (1606–1673), French botanist and clergyman; plant collector in southern France, Spain and Italy | Acanthaceae | St |
| Barleriola | Jacques Barrelier (1606–1673), French botanist and clergyman; plant collector in southern France, Spain and Italy | Acanthaceae | Bu |
| Barnadesia | Miguel Barnades (1708/1717–1771), Spanish botanist; personal physician to Charles III; professor at the botanical garden in Madrid | Asteraceae | Qu |
| Barnardia | Edward Barnard (1786–1861), English zoologist and botanist; vice president of the Royal Horticultural Society | Asparagaceae | Bu |
| Barnebya | Rupert Charles Barneby (1911–2000) | Malpighiaceae | Bu |
| Barnebydendron | Rupert Charles Barneby (1911–2000) | Fabaceae | Bu |
| Barnhartia | John Hendley Barnhart | Polygalaceae | Bu |
| Baronia | Richard Baron (1847–1907) | Anacardiaceae | Bu |
| Baroniella | Richard Baron (1847–1907) | Apocynaceae | Bu |
| Barringtonia | Daines Barrington (1727/28 – 1800) | Lecythidaceae | St |
| Barrosoa | Graziela Maciel Barroso (1912–2003) | Asteraceae | Bu |
| Barteria | Charles Barter (1821–1859) | Passifloraceae | Bu |
| Barthea | Jean Barthe (1814–1866), French naval doctor who wrote about his botanical observations | Melastomataceae | Bu |
| Barthlottia | Wilhelm Barthlott (b. 1946) | Scrophulariaceae | Bu |
| Bartholina | Thomas Bartholin (1616–1680), doctor | Orchidaceae | Bu |
| Bartholomaea | Bartolomé de las Casas (1484–1566), bishop | Salicaceae | Bu |
| Bartlettia | John Russell Bartlett (1805–1886), historian | Asteraceae | Bu |
| Bartlettina | Harley Harris Bartlett (1886–1960) | Asteraceae | Bu |
| Bartonia | Benjamin Smith Barton (1766–1815) | Gentianaceae | Bu |
| Bartsia | Johann Bartsch (1709–1738) | Orobanchaceae | Bu |
| Basedowia | Herbert Basedow (1881–1933) | Asteraceae | Bu |
| Baskervilla | Thomas Baskerville (1812–1840 ?) | Orchidaceae | Bu |
| Basselinia | Olivier Basselin (c. 1400 – c. 1450), poet | Arecaceae | Bu |
| Bassia | Ferdinando Bassi (1710–1774), Italian botanist | Amaranthaceae | Co |
| Bastardiastrum | Toussaint Bastard (1784–1846), French physician; professor of botany and director of the botanical garden in Angers | Malvaceae | Bu |
| Batemannia | James Bateman (1811–1897) | Orchidaceae | St |
| Batesanthus | George Latimer Bates (1863–1940) | Apocynaceae | Bu |
| Batesia | Henry Walter Bates (1825–1892) | Fabaceae | Bu |
| Batesimalva | David Martin Bates (1934–2019), American professor of botany at Cornell University | Malvaceae | Bu |
| Bathiorhamnus | Joseph Marie Henry Alfred Perrier de la Bâthie (1873–1958) | Rhamnaceae | Bu |
| Batopedina | Cornelis Eliza Bertus Bremekamp (1888–1984) | Rubiaceae | Bu |
| Baudouinia | Louis Alexis Baudoin (1776–1805), naval officer | Fabaceae | Bu |
| Bauera | Franz (1758–1840) and Ferdinand Bauer (1760–1826) | Cunoniaceae | St |
| Bauhinia | Johann (1541–1613) and Gaspard Bauhin (1560–1624) | Fabaceae | St |
| Baumia | Hugo Baum (1867–1950) | Orobanchaceae | Bu |
| Baxteria | William Baxter (1787 - between 1830 and 1836) | Dasypogonaceae | St |
| Bayabusua | Baya Busu, assistant in the herbarium of the Forest Research Institute Malaysia | Cucurbitaceae | Bu |
| Baynesia | Maudsley Baynes (1881–1971), English-born South African naturalist | Apocynaceae | Bu |
| Beaucarnea | Jean-Baptiste Beaucarne (1802 – 1889), Flemish lawyer who raised succulents and orchids for competitions | Asparagaceae | Ba |
| Beaufortia | Mary Somerset, Duchess of Beaufort (baptised 1630 –1715) | Myrtaceae | St |
| Beaumontia | Diana Wentworth Beaumont (d. 1831), botanical patron at Bretton Hall, West Yorkshire | Apocynaceae | St |
| Beauprea | Charles-François Beautemps-Beaupré (1766–1854) | Proteaceae | Bu |
| Beaupreopsis | Charles-François Beautemps-Beaupré (1766–1854) | Proteaceae | Bu |
| Beautempsia | Charles-François Beautemps-Beaupré (1766–1854) | Capparaceae | Bu |
| Bebbia | Michael Schuck Bebb (1833–1895) | Asteraceae | Bu |
| Beccarianthus | Odoardo Beccari (1843–1920) | Melastomataceae | Bu |
| Beccarinda | Odoardo Beccari (1843–1920) | Gesneriaceae | Bu |
| Beccariophoenix | Odoardo Beccari (1843–1920) | Arecaceae | Bu |
| Beckmannia | Johann Beckmann (1739–1811) | Poaceae | Bu |
| Beclardia | Pierre Augustin Béclard (1785–1825), doctor | Orchidaceae | Bu |
| Becquerelia | Antoine César Becquerel (1788–1878), scientist | Cyperaceae | Bu |
| Bedfordia | John Russell, 6th Duke of Bedford (1766–1839) | Asteraceae | Bu |
| Beesia | Arthur Bulley (1861–1942), of Bees Nursery | Ranunculaceae | Ba |
| Begonia | Michel Bégon (1638–1710), government official and plant collector | Begoniaceae | Ch |
| Beguea | Louis Henri Bégué (1906–1979), French civil servant in the forestry service in Ivory Coast and Madagascar | Sapindaceae | Bu |
| Behaimia | Martin Behaim (1459–1507) | Fabaceae | Bu |
| Behnia | Wilhelm Friedrich Georg Behn (1808–1878) | Asparagaceae | Bu |
| Beilschmiedia | Carl Traugott Beilschmied (1793–1848) | Lauraceae | Bu |
| Beirnaertia | Abiron-Frans-Adolf-Désiré Beirnert (1903–1941), Belgian botanist and agronomist, and a section head at the National Institute for Agronomic Study of the Belgian Congo | Menispermaceae | Bu |
| Beiselia | Karl-Werner Beisel (b. c. 1931), German merchant; cactus collector and grower | Burseraceae | Bu |
| Bejaranoa | Gastón Bejarano (20th century), Bolivian director of forestry and national parks | Asteraceae | Bu |
| Bejaria | José de Bejar (17th century), Spanish doctor and botanist from Cádiz | Ericaceae | St |
| Bellardia | Carlo Antonio Lodovico Bellardi (1741–1826), Italian professor of botany; doctor in Turin | Orobanchaceae | Qu |
| Bellardiochloa | Carlo Antonio Lodovico Bellardi (1741–1826), Italian professor of botany; doctor in Turin | Poaceae | Bu |
| Bellendena | John Bellenden Ker Gawler (1764–1842) | Proteaceae | Bu |
| Bellevalia | Pierre Richer de Belleval (1564–1632) | Asparagaceae | Co |
| Belloa | Andrés Bello (1781–1865), polymath and diplomat | Asteraceae | Bu |
| Bellonia | Pierre Belon (1517–1564) | Gesneriaceae | Bu |
| Bellucia | Toma Belluci (d. 1672), Italian botanical garden director in Pisa | Melastomataceae | Bu |
| Bencomia | Bencomo (c. 1438–1494), king | Rosaceae | Bu |
| Benincasa | Giuseppe Benincasa (died late 1595) | Cucurbitaceae | Co |
| Benjaminia | Ludwig Benjamin (1825–1848) | Plantaginaceae | Bu |
| Bennettiodendron | John Joseph Bennett | Salicaceae | Bu |
| Benoistia | Raymond Benoist (1881–1970) | Euphorbiaceae | Bu |
| Bensoniella | Gilbert Thereon Benson (1896–1928), American botanist; librarian of the Dudley Herbarium at Stanford University | Saxifragaceae | Qu |
| Benstonea | Benjamin Clemens Stone (1933–1994) | Pandanaceae | Bu |
| Benthamia | George Bentham (1800–1884) | Orchidaceae | Bu |
| Benthamiella | George Bentham (1800–1884) | Solanaceae | Bu |
| Benthamina | George Bentham (1800–1884) | Loranthaceae | Bu |
| Bentinckia | Lord William Bentinck (1774–1839), colonial administrator | Arecaceae | Bu |
| Benzingia | David Hill Benzing (b. 1937), American botanist and professor of biology at Oberlin College; specialist in Bromeliaceae and epiphytes | Orchidaceae | Bu |
| Benzonia | Peder Eggert Benzon (1788–1848), Danish pharmacist and botanist in Saint Croix | Rubiaceae | Bu |
| Bequaertia | Joseph Charles Bequaert (1886–1982) | Celastraceae | Bu |
| Berardia | Pierre Bérard (c. 1580 – c. 1664), French apothecary and botanist in Grenoble; wrote a six-volume encyclopedia of plants | Asteraceae | Bu |
| Berchemia | Jacob Pierre Berthoud van Berchem (1763–1832), Dutch-born Swiss naturalist and mineralogist | Rhamnaceae | Ba |
| Berchemiella | Jacob Pierre Berthoud van Berchem (1763–1832), Dutch-born Swiss naturalist and mineralogist | Rhamnaceae | Qu |
| Bergenia | Karl August von Bergen (1704–1759) | Saxifragaceae | Co |
| Bergeranthus | Alwin Berger (1871–1931) | Aizoaceae | Bu |
| Bergerocactus | Alwin Berger (1871–1931) | Cactaceae | St |
| Berghesia | Carl de Berghes (1792–1869), German engineer; collected plants near the Aztec ruins in Zacatecas in Mexico | Rubiaceae | Bu |
| Bergia | Peter Jonas Bergius (1730–1790) | Elatinaceae | Bu |
| Berhautia | Jean Berhaut (1902–1977), French clergyman, botanist and entomologist; collected plants in Senegal | Loranthaceae | Qu |
| Berkheya | Johannes le Francq van Berkhey (1729–1812) | Asteraceae | St |
| Berlandiera | Jean-Louis Berlandier (1803–1851) | Asteraceae | St |
| Berlinia | Andreas Berlin (1746–1773) | Fabaceae | Bu |
| Bernardia | Charles Bernard (1699–1777) | Euphorbiaceae | Bt |
| Berneuxia | Siméon-François Berneux (1814–1866), missionary | Diapensiaceae | Bu |
| Bernoullia | Carl Gustav Bernoulli (1834–1878), Swiss doctor and botanist; collected plants in the Mayan ruins of Tikal in Chiapas in Mexico | Malvaceae | Bu |
| Berroa | Mariano B. Berro (d. 1922), Uruguayan botanist in Montevideo; specialist in grasses | Asteraceae | Bu |
| Berrya | Andrew Berry (1764–1833), English doctor with the Madras Medical Service (now part of the Army Medical Corps) in India; sent plants to the botanical garden in Kolkata | Malvaceae | Qu |
| Berteroa | Carlo Luigi Giuseppe Bertero (1789–1831) | Brassicaceae | St |
| Bertholletia | Claude Louis Berthollet (1748–1822), chemist (Note: He was also a senator, but here and elsewhere, preference is given to professions more relevant to natural science.) | Lecythidaceae | St |
| Bertiera | Bertier, a French Guianese woman who helped Jean Baptiste Christophore Fusée Aublet with his study of the native plants, including this genus | Rubiaceae | Bu |
| Bertolonia | Antonio Bertoloni (1775–1869) | Melastomataceae | St |
| Bertya | Léonce de Lambertye (1810–1877), French botanist and horticulturalist; wrote about strawberries and other plants in the vicinity of the Marne | Euphorbiaceae | Qu |
| Berylsimpsonia | Beryl B. Simpson (b. 1942) | Asteraceae | Bu |
| Berzelia | Jöns Jacob Berzelius (1779–1848), chemist | Bruniaceae | Bu |
| Beschorneria | Friedrich Wilhelm Christian Beschorner (1806–1873), German-Silesian psychiatrist with botanical interests; was related to the author of this genus | Asparagaceae | Ba |
| Bessera | Wilibald Swibert Joseph Gottlieb von Besser (1784–1842) | Asparagaceae | Co |
| Bethencourtia | Jean de Béthencourt (1362–1425), colonial administrator | Asteraceae | Bu |
| Bewsia | John Bews (1884–1938) | Poaceae | Bu |
| Beyeria | Adriaan de Beijer (1773–1843), Dutch City Secretary in Nijmegen; researched and wrote about grasses and spore-bearing plants | Euphorbiaceae | Bu |
| Bhidea | Shri Ramchandra Kashinath Bhide (1873–1946), Indian curator at the agricultural college in Pune | Poaceae | Bu |
| Biancaea | Giuseppe Bianca (1801–1883), Italian botanist and agronomist; cultivated almond trees in Avola on Sicily | Fabaceae | Bu |
| Biebersteinia | Friedrich August Marschall von Bieberstein (1768–1826) | Biebersteiniaceae | Ch |
| Bienertia | Theophil Joachim Heinrich Bienert (1833–1873) | Amaranthaceae | Bu |
| Biermannia | Adolph Biermann (d. 1880), curator of the botanical garden in Kolkata | Orchidaceae | Qu |
| Bigelowia | Jacob Bigelow (1787–1879) | Asteraceae | St |
| Bignonia | Jean-Paul Bignon (1662–1743), statesman and royal librarian | Bignoniaceae | Ch |
| Bikkia | either Adrianus Johannes Bik (1790–1872) or his brother Jannus Theodorus Bik (1796–1875), both botanical illustrators | Rubiaceae | Bu |
| Billardiera | Jacques Labillardière (1755–1834) | Pittosporaceae | Co |
| Billbergia | Gustaf Johan Billberg (1772–1844) | Bromeliaceae | St |
| Billburttia | B. L. Burtt (1913–2008) | Apiaceae | Bu |
| Billia | Johann Georg Bill (1813–1870), Austrian professor of botany at the University of Graz | Sapindaceae | Bu |
| Billieturnera | Billie Lee Turner (1925–2020) | Malvaceae | Bu |
| Billolivia | Olive Mary Hilliard (b. 1925) and B. L. Burtt (1913–2008) | Gesneriaceae | Bu |
| Bisboeckelera | Johann Otto Boeckeler (1803–1899) | Cyperaceae | Bu |
| Bischofia | Gottlieb Wilhelm Bischoff (1797–1854) | Phyllanthaceae | St |
| Bisglaziovia | Auguste François Marie Glaziou (1828–1906) | Melastomataceae | Bu |
| Bisgoeppertia | Heinrich Göppert (1800–1884) | Gentianaceae | Bu |
| Bishopanthus | Luther Earl Bishop (1943–1991), American botanist; collected in the US and Colombia | Asteraceae | Bu |
| Bishopiella | Luther Earl Bishop (1943–1991), American botanist; collected in the US and Colombia | Asteraceae | Bu |
| Bishovia | Luther Earl Bishop (1943–1991), American botanist; collected in the US and Colombia | Asteraceae | Bu |
| Bismarckia | Otto von Bismarck (1815–1898), chancellor | Arecaceae | St |
| Bivinia | Louis Hyacinthe Boivin (1808–1852), French botanist; collected for the National Museum of Natural History | Salicaceae | Qu |
| Bivonaea | Antonino de Bivona-Bernardi (1774 or 1778–1837) | Brassicaceae | Bu |
| Blachia | Jean Gaston Marie Blache (1799–1871), French doctor who supported the author of this genus, Henri Ernest Baillon | Euphorbiaceae | Bu |
| Blackallia | William Blackall (1876–1941) | Rhamnaceae | Bu |
| Blackstonia | John Blackstone (1712–1753), English apothecary and botanist | Gentianaceae | Qu |
| Blainvillea | Henri Marie Ducrotay de Blainville (1777–1850) | Asteraceae | Bu |
| Blakea | Martin Blake of Antigua, friend and patron of the author of this genus, Patrick Browne | Melastomataceae | Qu |
| Blakiella | Sidney Fay Blake (1892–1959) | Asteraceae | Bu |
| Blanchetia | Jacques Samuel Blanchet (1807–1875), Swiss merchant, botanist and plant collector; worked for a Swiss export firm in Bahia in Brazil | Asteraceae | Qu |
| Blanchetiodendron | Jacques Samuel Blanchet (1807–1875), Swiss merchant, botanist and plant collector; worked for a Swiss export firm in Bahia in Brazil | Fabaceae | Bu |
| Blancoa | Francisco Manuel Blanco (1779–1845) | Haemodoraceae | Bu |
| Blandfordia | George Spencer-Churchill, 5th Duke of Marlborough (1766–1840) | Blandfordiaceae | Ch |
| Bleasdalea | John Bleasdale (1822–1884) | Proteaceae | Bu |
| Bleekrodea | Salomon Abraham Bleekrode (1814–1862), Dutch doctor in Groningen; professor of natural science | Moraceae | Bu |
| Bletia | Luis Blet y Gazel (1742–1808), Spanish military and court apothecary in Argentina and Spain | Orchidaceae | Ba |
| Bletilla | Luis Blet y Gazel (1742–1808), Spanish military and court apothecary in Argentina and Spain | Orchidaceae | Co |
| Blighia | William Bligh (1754–1817), naval officer | Sapindaceae | St |
| Blighiopsis | William Bligh (1754–1817), naval officer | Sapindaceae | Bu |
| Blinkworthia | Robert Blinkworth, collector of plants for Nathaniel Wallich around Yangon (Note: Present-day geographical names are used wherever possible.) | Convolvulaceae | Qu |
| Blomia | Frans Blom (1893–1963), archeologist | Sapindaceae | Bu |
| Bloomeria | H. G. Bloomer (1821–1874), American botanist in California | Asparagaceae | St |
| Blossfeldia | Harry Blossfeld (1913–1986), German-born Brazilian gardener in São Paulo; collected plants in Argentina, Paraguay, Uruguay, Bolivia and Peru | Cactaceae | Ba |
| Blotiella | Marie Laure Tardieu-Blot (1902–1998) | Dennstaedtiaceae | Bt |
| Blumea | Carl Ludwig Blume (1796–1862) | Asteraceae | Bu |
| Blumenbachia | Johann Friedrich Blumenbach (1752–1840) | Loasaceae | St |
| Blumeodendron | Carl Ludwig Blume (1796–1862) | Euphorbiaceae | Bu |
| Bobartia | Jacob Bobart the Younger (1641–1719) | Iridaceae | Bu |
| Bobea | Jean-Baptiste Bobe-Moreau (1761–1849), French doctor and naval pharmacist in Rochefort, Charente-Maritime; published a catalog of the plants in that district, and founded a directory of eponymic plant names | Rubiaceae | Qu |
| Bobgunnia | Charles Robert Gunn (1927–2015), American director of the National Seed Herbarium at the Department of Agriculture; wrote a multi-volume work on Fabaceae | Fabaceae | Bu |
| Bocagea | Manuel Maria Barbosa du Bocage (1765–1805), poet | Annonaceae | Bu |
| Bocageopsis | Manuel Maria Barbosa du Bocage (1765–1805), poet | Annonaceae | Bu |
| Bocconia | Paolo Boccone (1633–1704) | Papaveraceae | St |
| Bocquillonia | Henri Théophile Bocquillon (1834–1884) | Euphorbiaceae | Bu |
| Boea | François Beau (1723–1804), French priest and mayor in Toulon-sur-Arroux in Burgundy | Gesneriaceae | Bu |
| Boeberastrum | Johann von Böber (1746–1820) | Asteraceae | Bu |
| Boeberoides | Johann von Böber (1746–1820) | Asteraceae | Bu |
| Boechera | Tyge W. Böcher (1909–1983) | Brassicaceae | Bu |
| Boehmeria | Georg Rudolf Boehmer (1723–1803) | Urticaceae | St |
| Boeica | François Beau (1723–1804), French priest and mayor in Toulon-sur-Arroux in Burgundy | Gesneriaceae | Bu |
| Boelckea | Osvaldo Boelcke (1920–1990), Argentinian botanist and agronomist; professor at the University of Buenos Aires; specialist in Brassicaceae | Plantaginaceae | Bu |
| Boenninghausenia | Clemens Maria Franz von Bönninghausen (1785–1864) | Rutaceae | Co |
| Boerhavia | Herman Boerhaave (1668–1738) | Nyctaginaceae | Bu |
| Boerlagea | Jacob Gijsbert Boerlage (1849–1900) | Melastomataceae | Bu |
| Boesenbergia | Clara and Walter Bösenberg, sister and brother-in-law of the author of this genus, Otto Kuntze | Zingiberaceae | Bu |
| Bognera | Josef Bogner (b. 1939), German botanist; director of the botanical garden in Munich; specialist in Araceae | Araceae | Bu |
| Bolandra | Henry Nicholas Bolander (1831–1897) | Saxifragaceae | Bu |
| Boltonia | James Bolton (1735–1799) | Asteraceae | Co |
| Bolusafra | Harry Bolus (1834–1911) | Fabaceae | Bu |
| Bolusanthus | Harry Bolus (1834–1911) | Fabaceae | Ba |
| Bolusia | Harry Bolus (1834–1911) | Fabaceae | Bu |
| Bolusiella | Harry Bolus (1834–1911) | Orchidaceae | Bu |
| Bomarea | Jacques-Christophe Valmont de Bomare (1731–1807) | Alstroemeriaceae | St |
| Bomarea | Jacques-Christophe Valmont de Bomare (1731–1807) | Alstroemeriaceae | St |
| Bommeria | Jean-Édouard Bommer (1829–1895) | Pteridaceae | Bt |
| Bonania | Sebastian Bonani, research assistant to Ramón de la Sagra | Euphorbiaceae | Bu |
| Bonannia | Antonino Bonanni, student of and illustrator for Francesco Cupani | Apiaceae | Bu |
| Bonatea | Giuseppe Antonio Bonato (1753–1836), Italian professor of botany and director of the botanical garden in Padua | Orchidaceae | Qu |
| Bonellia | Franco Andrea Bonelli (1784–1830) | Primulaceae | Bu |
| Bonetiella | Federico Bonet Marco (1906–1980), Spanish entomologist, micropaleontologist and speleologist, initially at the National Museum of Natural Sciences and the veterinary school in Madrid; fled to Mexico in the late 1930s and became a professor | Anacardiaceae | Bu |
| Bongardia | Gustav Heinrich von Bongard (1786–1839) | Berberidaceae | Co |
| Bonia | Henri François Bon (1844–1894), French clergyman and amateur botanist; collected in Indochina | Poaceae | Bu |
| Boniodendron | Henri François Bon (1844–1894), French clergyman and amateur botanist; collected in Indochina | Sapindaceae | Bu |
| Bonnaya | Charles François, Marquis de Bonnay, army officer and politician | Linderniaceae | Bu |
| Bonnetia | Charles Bonnet (1750–1825) | Bonnetiaceae | Ch |
| Bonplandia | Aimé Bonpland (1773–1858) | Polemoniaceae | Bu |
| Bontia | Jacobus Bontius (1592–1631), doctor | Scrophulariaceae | Bu |
| Bonyunia | George R. Bonyun (c. 1811 – 1853), doctor in Georgetown, Guyana; friend of the author of the genus, Moritz Richard Schomburgk | Loganiaceae | Bu |
| Bordasia | Eugenia E. Bordas (d. 2018), Paraguayan botanist; was with the group that found the plant | Malvaceae | Bu |
| Borismene | Boris Alexander Krukoff (1898–1983) | Menispermaceae | Qu |
| Bornmuellera | Joseph Friedrich Nicolaus Bornmüller (1862–1948) | Brassicaceae | Bu |
| Borodinia | Ivan Parfenievich Borodin (1847–1930) | Brassicaceae | Bu |
| Boronia | Francesco Borone (1769–1794), Italian naturalist | Rutaceae | St |
| Borrichia | Ole Borch (1626–1690) | Asteraceae | Bu |
| Borthwickia | Albert William Borthwick (1872–1937), Scottish botanist and professor of forestry at the University of Aberdeen | Resedaceae | Bu |
| Borya | Jean Baptiste Bory de Saint-Vincent (1778–1846) | Boryaceae | Bu |
| Borzicactus | Antonino Borzì (1852–1921) | Cactaceae | Bu |
| Boschia | Johannes van den Bosch (1780–1844), colonial administrator | Malvaceae | Bu |
| Boschniakia | Alexander Karlovich Boschniak (1786–1831), Russian botanist | Orobanchaceae | Bu |
| Boscia | Louis Augustin Guillaume Bosc (1759–1828) | Capparaceae | Bu |
| Bosea | Caspar Bose (1645–1700) and his brother Georg Bose (1650–1700), German merchants who established baroque gardens in Leipzig | Amaranthaceae | Bu |
| Bosistoa | Joseph Bosisto (1827–1898) | Rutaceae | Bu |
| Bossera | Jean Marie Bosser (1922–2013) | Euphorbiaceae | Bu |
| Bossiaea | Joseph Hugues Boissieu La Martinière (1758–1788) | Fabaceae | St |
| Boswellia | James Boswell (1740–1795), writer | Burseraceae | St |
| Botschantzevia | Victor Botchantsev (1910–1990) | Brassicaceae | Bu |
| Bottegoa | Vittorio Bottego (1860–1897), army officer | Rutaceae | Bu |
| Bouchardatia | Apollinaire Bouchardat (1809–1886) | Rutaceae | Bu |
| Bouchea | Peter Friedrich Bouché (1785–1856), and his brother, Peter Karl Bouché (1783–1856), a gardener and botanist | Verbenaceae | Bu |
| Bouchetia | Dominique Bouchet-Doumenq (1771–1844), French physician and botanist in Montpellier | Solanaceae | Qu |
| Bouea | Ami Boué (1794–1881) | Anacardiaceae | Bu |
| Bouffordia | David Edward Boufford (b. 1941), an American botanist (bryology and pteridology), from the Herbaria at Harvard University | Fabaceae | Bt |
| Bougainvillea | Louis Antoine de Bougainville (1729–1811), naval officer | Nyctaginaceae | Co |
| Bourreria | Johann Ambrosius Beurer (1716–1754), German physician, apothecary and naturalist | Boraginaceae | Bu |
| Bousigonia | Ėtienne Nicolas Aristide Bousigon (b. 1836), French naval officer, plant collector | Apocynaceae | Bu |
| Bouteloua | Claudio Boutelou (1774–1842), Spanish gardener and botanist, and his brother Esteban Boutelou (1776–1813), botanist and agronomist | Poaceae | Ba |
| Boutiquea | Raymond Boutique (1906–1985), Belgian botanist | Annonaceae | Bu |
| Boutonia | Louis Bouton (1800–1878), French-Mauritian botanist in Port Louis, Mauritius | Acanthaceae | Qu |
| Bouvardia | Charles Bouvard (1572–1658) | Rubiaceae | Co |
| Bouzetia | Eugène du Bouzet (1805–1867), French counter admiral and governor of New Caledonia; promoter of natural scientists | Rutaceae | Bu |
| Bowdichia | Thomas Edward Bowdich (1791–1824) | Fabaceae | Bu |
| Bowenia | George Bowen (1821–1899), colonial administrator | Zamiaceae | Ba |
| Bowiea | James Bowie (c. 1789–1869) | Asparagaceae | St |
| Bowkeria | James Henry Bowker (1825–1900), and Mary Elizabeth (Bowker) Barber (1818–1899) | Stilbaceae | St |
| Bowlesia | William Bowles (1705–1780) | Apiaceae | Bu |
| Bowringia | John Bowring (1792–1872), colonial administrator, and his son John Charles Bowring (1821–1893) | Fabaceae | Bu |
| Boyania | Jonah Boyan (fl. 1952), and Rufas Boyan (fl. 1950–1969), Arawak horticulturalists who worked for the British Guyana Forestry Department and the New York Botanical Garden | Melastomataceae | Bu |
| Boykinia | Samuel Boykin (1786–1846), American botanist in Georgia | Saxifragaceae | St |
| Brackenridgea | William Brackenridge (1810–1893) | Ochnaceae | Bu |
| Bradburia | John Bradbury (1768–1823) | Asteraceae | Bu |
| Bradea | Alexander Curt Brade (1881–1971) | Rubiaceae | Bu |
| Braemia | Guido Jozef Braem (b. 1944), Belgian-born German natural scientist (botanist, chemist, molecular biologist) | Orchidaceae | Qu |
| Brahea | Tycho Brahe (1546–1601), astronomer | Arecaceae | St |
| Brandegea | Townshend Stith Brandegee (1843–1925) | Cucurbitaceae | Bu |
| Brandella | August Brand (1863–1930) | Boraginaceae | Bu |
| Brandisia | Dietrich Brandis (1824–1907) | Orobanchaceae | Bu |
| Brandzeia | Dimitrie Brândză (1846–1895) | Fabaceae | Bu |
| Brasenia | Christoph Brasen (1738–1774), Danish doctor, missionary and botanist | Cabombaceae | Bu |
| Brassaiopsis | Sámuel Brassai (1797–1897) | Araliaceae | Bu |
| Brassavola | Antonio Musa Brassavola (1500–1555), doctor | Orchidaceae | St |
| Brassia | William Brass (d. 1783), English botanist; collected in West Africa | Orchidaceae | St |
| Brassiantha | Leonard John Brass (1900–1971) | Celastraceae | Bu |
| Brassiophoenix | Leonard John Brass (1900–1971) | Arecaceae | Bu |
| Braunsia | Hans Brauns (1857–1929) | Aizoaceae | Bu |
| Bravaisia | Auguste Bravais (1811–1863), and his brother Louis (1801–1843), doctor and botanist | Acanthaceae | Bu |
| Braya | Franz Gabriel von Bray (1765–1832), Bavarian diplomat and naturalist; German ambassador to the United Kingdom | Brassicaceae | Qu |
| Brayopsis | Franz Gabriel von Bray (1765–1832), Bavarian diplomat and naturalist; German ambassador to the United Kingdom | Brassicaceae | Bu |
| Brazzeia | Pierre Savorgnan de Brazza (1852–1905), explorer | Lecythidaceae | Bu |
| Bredemeyera | Franz Bredemeyer (1758–1839), Austrian imperial court gardener at Schönbrunn Palace | Polygalaceae | Qu |
| Bredia | Jacob Gijsbertus Samuël van Breda (1788–1867) | Melastomataceae | Bu |
| Bremeria | Birgitta Bremer (b. 1950) | Rubiaceae | Bu |
| Brenandendron | John Patrick Micklethwait Brenan (1917–1985) | Asteraceae | Bu |
| Brenania | John Patrick Micklethwait Brenan (1917–1985) | Rubiaceae | Bu |
| Brenierea | Jean Brenière (1924–2014); worked for the agricultural service in Madagascar in the 1950s as head of the Betioky anti-locust station | Fabaceae | Bu |
| Breonadia | Jean Nicolas Bréon (1785–1864) | Rubiaceae | Bu |
| Breonia | Jean Nicolas Bréon (1785–1864) | Rubiaceae | Bu |
| Bretschneidera | Emil Bretschneider (1833–1901) | Akaniaceae | Bu |
| Breviea | Jules Brévié (1880–1964), colonial administrator | Sapotaceae | Bu |
| Breynia | Jacob Breyne (1637–1697), and his son Johann Philipp Breyne (1680–1764) | Phyllanthaceae | Ba |
| Brianhuntleya | Brian Huntley (b. 1944) | Aizoaceae | Bu |
| Brickellia | John Brickell (1748–1809), Irish-born American doctor and botanist | Asteraceae | St |
| Brickelliastrum | John Brickell (1748–1809), Irish-born American doctor and botanist | Asteraceae | Qu |
| Bridelia | Samuel Elisée Bridel-Brideri (1761–1828) | Phyllanthaceae | Bu |
| Bridgesia | Thomas Bridges (1807–1865) | Sapindaceae | Bu |
| Bridsonia | Diane Mary Bridson (b.1942), English botanist and illustrator from Royal Botanic Gardens, Kew | Rubiaceae | Bt |
| Brieya | Jacques de Briey (1885–1914), French-born Belgian agronomist | Annonaceae | Bu |
| Briggsiopsis | Munro Briggs Scott (1889–1917) | Gesneriaceae | Bu |
| Brighamia | William Tufts Brigham (1841–1926) | Campanulaceae | Bu |
| Brillantaisia | Louis-Marie Marion-Brillantais (1743–1829), French ship designer and shipping magnate who provided wood for military ships | Acanthaceae | Bu |
| Brimeura | Marie de Brimeu (ca.1550–1605) | Asparagaceae | Co |
| Brintonia | Jeremiah Bernard Brinton (1835–1894), American botanist and Solidago specialist | Asteraceae | Bu |
| Briquetia | John Isaac Briquet (1870–1931) | Malvaceae | Bu |
| Brocchia | Giovanni Battista Brocchi (1772–1826) | Asteraceae | Bu |
| Brocchinia | Giovanni Battista Brocchi (1772–1826) | Bromeliaceae | Bu |
| Brodiaea | James Brodie (1744–1824) | Asparagaceae | Co |
| Brodriguesia | João Barbosa Rodrigues (1842–1909) | Fabaceae | Bu |
| Brombya | John Edward Bromby (1809–1889), schoolmaster | Rutaceae | Bu |
| Bromelia | Olof Bromelius (1639–1705), Swedish doctor and botanist | Bromeliaceae | Ch |
| Bromheadia | Edward Bromhead (1789–1855), mathematician | Orchidaceae | St |
| Brongniartia | Adolphe-Théodore Brongniart (1801–1876) | Fabaceae | Bu |
| Bronwenia | Bronwen Gates (b. 1945), American botanist; wrote a monograph on Malpighiaceae | Malpighiaceae | Bu |
| Brookea | James Brooke (1803–1868), ruler of Sarawak | Plantaginaceae | Bu |
| Broughtonia | Arthur Broughton (c. 1758–1796) | Orchidaceae | St |
| Broussonetia | Pierre Marie Auguste Broussonet (1761–1807) | Moraceae | Co |
| Browallia | Johannes Browallius (1707–1755) | Solanaceae | Co |
| Brownea | Patrick Browne (1720–1790) | Fabaceae | St |
| Browneopsis | Patrick Browne (1720–1790) | Fabaceae | Bu |
| Browningia | Webster E. Browning (1869–1942), teacher; director of the Instituto Inglés in Santiago de Chile | Cactaceae | Ba |
| Brownleea | John Brownlee (1791–1871), English botanist, clergyman, linguist, gardener, and missionary in South Africa | Orchidaceae | Qu |
| Brownlowia | Amelia Sophia Hume (1788–1814), patron of the natural sciences; married John Cust, 1st Earl Brownlow | Malvaceae | Bu |
| Brucea | James Bruce (1730–1794), travel writer | Simaroubaceae | Bu |
| Brugmansia | Sebald Justinus Brugmans (1763–1819) | Solanaceae | Co |
| Bruguiera | Jean Guillaume Bruguière (1749–1798) | Rhizophoraceae | Bu |
| Bruinsmia | Abraham Eduard Johannes Bruinsma (1852–1943), Dutch forester in the Dutch East Indies | Styracaceae | Bu |
| Brunellia | Gabriele Brunelli (1728–1797), Italian clergyman and botanist; botanical garden curator in Bologna | Brunelliaceae | Ch |
| Brunfelsia | Otto Brunfels (1488? –1534) | Solanaceae | Co |
| Brunia | Alexander Brown (fl. 1692–1698), English doctor and plant collector; ship's doctor with the East India Company | Bruniaceae | Qu |
| Brunnera | Samuel Brunner (1790–1844), Swiss botanist | Boraginaceae | Co |
| Brunnichia | Morten Thrane Brünnich (1737–1827) | Polygonaceae | Bu |
| Brunonia | Robert Brown | Goodeniaceae | St |
| Brunoniella | Robert Brown | Acanthaceae | Bu |
| Brunsvigia | Charles I, Duke of Brunswick-Wolfenbüttel (1713–1780) | Amaryllidaceae | St |
| Brya | J. T. de Bry (1564–1617), engraver | Fabaceae | St |
| Bryantiella | Susanna Bixby Bryant (1880–1946), founded the Rancho Santa Ana Botanic Garden (now the California Botanic Garden), near the present-day Susanna Bixby Bryant Museum | Polemoniaceae | Bu |
| Brylkinia | Aleksandr Dmitrievich Brylkin (fl. 1859–1865), ethnographer and plant collector in Siberia | Poaceae | Bu |
| Buchanania | Francis Buchanan-Hamilton (1762–1829) | Anacardiaceae | Bu |
| Buchholzia | Reinhold Wilhelm Buchholz (1837–1876) | Capparaceae | Bu |
| Buchnera | Andreas Elias Büchner (1701–1769), German physician, natural scientist and professor of medicine | Orobanchaceae | Bu |
| Buchnerodendron | Max Buchner (1846–1921), German doctor, ethnologist and explorer | Achariaceae | Bu |
| Buchtienia | Otto Buchtien (1859–1946), German teacher and botanist; plant collector in Chile | Orchidaceae | Qu |
| Buckinghamia | The 3rd Duke of Buckingham and Chandos (1823–1889) | Proteaceae | Bu |
| Buckleya | Samuel Botsford Buckley (1809–1884) | Santalaceae | Bu |
| Buckollia | anagram of Bullockia, after Arthur Allman Bullock (1906–1980) | Apocynaceae | Bu |
| Bucquetia | Jean-Baptiste-Michel Bucquet (1746–1780), chemist | Melastomataceae | Bu |
| Buddleja | Adam Buddle (1662–1715) | Scrophulariaceae | Co |
| Buergersiochloa | Theodor Joseph Bürgers (with name variants), (1881–1954), German doctor and zoologist | Poaceae | Bu |
| Bufonia | Georges-Louis Leclerc, Comte de Buffon (1707–1788) | Caryophyllaceae | Bu |
| Buforrestia | Thomas Forrest (c.1729–c.1802), navigator | Commelinaceae | Bu |
| Bukiniczia | Dimitri D. Bukinich (1882–1939), Russian geographer, hydrogeologist and ethnographer; also a botanist and agronomist | Plumbaginaceae | Bu |
| Bulleyia | Arthur Bulley (1861–1942) | Orchidaceae | Bu |
| Bullockia | Arthur Allman Bullock (1906–1980), English botanist at Kew Herbarium from 1929 to 1968 | Rubiaceae | Bu |
| Bulnesia | Manuel Bulnes (1799–1866), president | Zygophyllaceae | Bu |
| Bungea | Alexander von Bunge (1803–1890) | Orobanchaceae | Bu |
| Burbidgea | Frederick William Burbidge (1847–1905) | Zingiberaceae | Ba |
| Burchardia | Johann Heinrich Burckhard (1676–1738), German doctor; city physician in Wolfenbüttel | Colchicaceae | Qu |
| Burchellia | William John Burchell (1781–1863) | Rubiaceae | St |
| Burckella | William Burck (1848–1910) | Sapotaceae | Bu |
| Burdachia | Karl Friedrich Burdach (1776–1847) | Malpighiaceae | Bu |
| Burkartia | Arturo Eduardo Burkart (1906–1975), Argentine botanist and agricultural engineer; professor of agricultural sciences in La Plata | Asteraceae | Bu |
| Burkea | Joseph Burke (1812–1873) | Fabaceae | Bu |
| Burkillanthus | Isaac Henry Burkill (1870–1965) | Rutaceae | Bu |
| Burkilliodendron | Isaac Henry Burkill (1870–1965) | Fabaceae | Bu |
| Burmannia | Johannes Burman (1707–1780) | Burmanniaceae | Ch |
| Burmeistera | Hermann Burmeister (1807–1892) | Campanulaceae | Bu |
| Burnatia | Émile Burnat (1828–1920) | Alismataceae | Bu |
| Burnettia | Gilbert Thomas Burnett (1800–1835) | Orchidaceae | Bu |
| Burretiodendron | Max Burret (1883–1964) | Malvaceae | Bu |
| Burretiokentia | Max Burret (1883–1964) | Arecaceae | Bu |
| Bursera | Joachim Burser (1583–1639) | Burseraceae | Ch |
| Burttia | Bernard Dearman Burtt (1902–1938), British botanist in Tanganyika | Connaraceae | Qu |
| Bussea | Walter Carl Otto Busse (1868–1933) | Fabaceae | Bu |
| Butea | John Stuart, 3rd Earl of Bute (1713–1792) | Fabaceae | St |
| Buttonia | Edward Button (1836–1900), English botanist; collected plants in South Africa | Orobanchaceae | Qu |
| Cabralea | Pedro Álvares Cabral (c.1467 or 1468–c.1520), explorer | Meliaceae | Bu |
| Cabreriella | Ángel Lulio Cabrera (1908–1999) | Asteraceae | Bu |
| Caccinia | Matteo Caccini (1573–1640), Italian aristocrat and botanist | Boraginaceae | Bu |
| Cadellia | Francis Cadell (1822–1879), explorer and colonialist | Surianaceae | Bu |
| Caesalpinia | Andrea Cesalpino (1524–1603) | Fabaceae | Co |
| Caesia | Federico Cesi (1585–1630) | Asphodelaceae | Bu |
| Cailliella | René Caillié (1799–1838), explorer | Melastomataceae | Bu |
| Calandrinia | Jean-Louis Calandrini (1703–1758) | Montiaceae | Co |
| Caldcluvia | Alexander Caldcleugh (d. 1858), traveler and fellow of the Royal Society | Cunoniaceae | St |
| Caldesia | Lodovico Caldesi (1821–1884), Italian politician and botanist | Alismataceae | Qu |
| Caleana | George Caley (1770–1829) | Orchidaceae | Bu |
| Calibrachoa | Antonio de la Cal y Bracho (1764/1766–1833), Spanish-born Mexican botanist and professor of pharmacology | Solanaceae | Bu |
| Callerya | Joseph-Marie Callery (1810–1862), French clergyman and sinologist; collected plants for Joseph Decaisne | Fabaceae | Bu |
| Callisthene | Callisthenes, historian | Vochysiaceae | Bu |
| Calodecaryia | Raymond Decary (1891–1973), French botanist | Meliaceae | Qu |
| Calomeria | Napoleon Bonaparte, probably, from Greek for "attractive part" (Italian "buena parte") | Asteraceae | St |
| Calpurnia | Calpurnius, first-century poet | Fabaceae | St |
| Caluera | Carlyle A. Luer (1922–2019) | Orchidaceae | Bu |
| Calvoa | Atilano Calvo Iturburi (19th century), Spanish magistrate on Bioko island, off Equatorial Guinea | Melastomataceae | Bu |
| Camarea | Manuel Ferreira da Câmara Bethencourt Aguiar e Sá (1764–1835), Brazilian scientist; discovered the connection between volcanos and obsidian | Malpighiaceae | Bu |
| Cambessedesia | Jacques Cambessèdes (1799–1863) | Melastomataceae | Bu |
| Camellia | Georg Joseph Kamel (1661–1706) | Theaceae | Co |
| Cameraria | Joachim Camerarius the Younger (1534–1598) | Apocynaceae | Bu |
| Camissonia | Adelbert von Chamisso (1781–1838) | Onagraceae | Bu |
| Camissoniopsis | Adelbert von Chamisso (1781–1838) | Onagraceae | Bu |
| Camoensia | Luís de Camões (c.1524 or 1525–1580), poet | Fabaceae | St |
| Campbellia | William Hunter Campbell (1814–1883), secretary of what is now the Botanical Society of Scotland, and his brother J. Campbell, who collected plants for him in India | Orobanchaceae | Bu |
| Campomanesia | Pedro Rodríguez, Count of Campomanes (1723–1802) | Myrtaceae | Bu |
| Canbya | William Marriott Canby (1831–1904) | Papaveraceae | Bu |
| Cancrinia | Georg Ludwig Cancrin (1774–1845), nobleman | Asteraceae | Bu |
| Cancriniella | Georg Ludwig Cancrin (1774–1845), nobleman | Asteraceae | Bu |
| Candolleodendron | Augustin Pyramus de Candolle (1778–1841) | Fabaceae | Bu |
| Cantinoa | Philip D. Cantino (b. 1948), American botanist at Ohio University; specialised in Lamiaceae | Lamiaceae | Bu |
| Cantleya | Nathaniel Cantley (1847–1888) | Stemonuraceae | Bu |
| Capanemia | Guilherme Schüch Capanema (1824–1908), Brazilian engineer and naturalist | Orchidaceae | Qu |
| Caperonia | Noël Caperon (d. 1572), French apothecary in Orleans | Euphorbiaceae | Qu |
| Capitanopsis | Baron von Müller-Prosko-Capitany (b. 1860); collected these plants near the Red Sea around 1880 | Lamiaceae | Bu |
| Capurodendron | René Paul Raymond Capuron (1921–1971) | Sapotaceae | Bu |
| Capuronia | René Paul Raymond Capuron (1921–1971) | Lythraceae | Bu |
| Capuronianthus | René Paul Raymond Capuron (1921–1971) | Meliaceae | Bu |
| Cardenasiodendron | Martín Cárdenas (1899–1973) | Anacardiaceae | Bu |
| Cardosoa | Helder Cardoso, the first to collect these plants | Asteraceae | Bu |
| Cardwellia | Edward Cardwell, 1st Viscount Cardwell (1813–1886) | Proteaceae | Bu |
| Careya | William Carey (1761–1834), missionary | Lecythidaceae | Bu |
| Cariniana | Eugène-Emmanuel de Savoie-Villafranca (1816–1888), nobleman of the House of Savoy-Carignano who funded the Brazilian excursions of the author of the genus | Lecythidaceae | Bu |
| Carlemannia | Charles Morgan Lemann (1806–1852) | Carlemanniaceae | Bu |
| Carlephyton | Georges Louis Carle (1879–1945), French agricultural engineer and head of the French colonial administration in Madagascar | Araceae | Bu |
| Carlesia | William Richard Carles (1848–1929), British diplomat who collected plants for the Royal Botanic Gardens while in Korea | Apiaceae | Bu |
| Carlina | Charlemagne (747–814), emperor | Asteraceae | Co |
| Carlowrightia | Charles Wright (1811–1885) | Acanthaceae | Bu |
| Carlquistia | Sherwin Carlquist (1930–2021) | Asteraceae | Bu |
| Carludovica | Charles IV of Spain (1748–1819) and Maria Luisa of Parma (1751–1819) | Cyclanthaceae | St |
| Carmichaelia | Dugald Carmichael (1772–1827) | Fabaceae | Co |
| Carminatia | Bassiano Carminati (1750–1830), Italian doctor in Lodi; professor in Pavia | Asteraceae | Bu |
| Carnarvonia | Henry Herbert, 4th Earl of Carnarvon (1831–1890) | Proteaceae | Bu |
| Carnegiea | Andrew Carnegie (1835–1919), industrialist and philanthropist | Cactaceae | St |
| Carnegieodoxa | Andrew Carnegie (1835–1919), industrialist and philanthropist | Monimiaceae | Bu |
| Carolus | Charles Cavender Davis (b. 1974), American botanist; specialist in Malpighiaceae | Malpighiaceae | Bu |
| Carpenteria | William Marbury Carpenter (1811–1848) | Hydrangeaceae | Co |
| Carrierea | Élie-Abel Carrière (1818–1896) | Salicaceae | St |
| Carrissoa | Luís Wittnich Carrisso (1886–1937) | Fabaceae | Bu |
| Carronia | William Carron (1821–1876), English and Australian botanist and explorer | Menispermaceae | Qu |
| Carruthersia | William Carruthers (1830–1922) | Apocynaceae | Bu |
| Carterella | Annetta Mary Carter (1907–1991) | Rubiaceae | Bu |
| Carvalhoa | Manuel Rodriguez de Carvalho (1848–1909); collected plants around 1884 in Mozambique | Apocynaceae | Bu |
| Casasia | Luis de Las Casas (1745–1800), colonial administrator | Rubiaceae | Bu |
| Casearia | Johannes Casearius (1642–1678), Dutch clergyman and missionary with the Dutch East India Company | Salicaceae | Qu |
| Casimirella | Casimir de Candolle (1836–1918) | Icacinaceae | Bu |
| Casimiroa | Casimiro Gómez, Otomi officer in the Mexican War of Independence | Rutaceae | St |
| Casselia | Franz Peter Cassel (1784–1821), German professor of botany and director of the botanical garden in Ghent | Verbenaceae | Bu |
| Cassinia | Henri Cassini (1781–1832) | Asteraceae | St |
| Castanedia | Rafael Romero Castañeda (1910–1973), Colombian botanist | Asteraceae | Bu |
| Castela | René Richard Louis Castel (1758–1832) | Simaroubaceae | Bu |
| Castellanosia | Alberto Castellanos (1896–1968), Argentinian paleobotanist, university professor of botany in Buenos Aires; specialist in Argentinian cactus | Cactaceae | Bu |
| Castellia | Pietro Castelli (1574–1662) | Poaceae | Bu |
| Castelnavia | François-Louis Laporte, comte de Castelnau (1802–1880) | Podostemaceae | Bu |
| Castilla | Juan Diego del Castillo (1744–1793) | Moraceae | Bu |
| Castilleja | Domingo Castillejo (died 1786) | Orobanchaceae | St |
| Castroviejoa | Santiago Castroviejo (1946–2009), Spanish professor of science and director of the botanical garden in Madrid | Asteraceae | Bu |
| Catesbaea | Mark Catesby (1683–1749) | Rubiaceae | St |
| Cattleya | William Cattley (1788–1835). | Orchidaceae | Co |
| Caulokaempferia | Engelbert Kaempfer (1651–1716) | Zingiberaceae | Bu |
| Cautleya | Proby Cautley (1802–1871), engineer | Zingiberaceae | Co |
| Cavacoa | Alberto Júdice Leote Cavaco (b. 1916), Portuguese professor of botany at the University of Lisbon | Euphorbiaceae | Qu |
| Cavalcantia | Paulo Bezerra Cavalcante (1922–2006), Brazilian botanist at the Museu Paraense Emílio Goeldi who collected this plant | Asteraceae | Bu |
| Cavanillesia | Antonio José Cavanilles (1745–1804) | Malvaceae | Bu |
| Cavea | George H. Cave (1870–1965), English gardener at Kew Gardens and the botanical gardens in Kolkata and Darjeeling, India | Asteraceae | Bu |
| Cavendishia | William Cavendish, 6th Duke of Devonshire (1790–1858) | Ericaceae | Bu |
| Caylusea | Anne Claude de Caylus (1692–1765), antiquarian | Resedaceae | Bu |
| Cecarria | Cedric Errol Carr (1892–1936) | Loranthaceae | Bu |
| Cerdia | Juan de Dios Vicente de la Cerda, Mexican painter who took part in the first years (1787–1791) of the Spanish Royal Botanical Expedition to New Spain | Caryophyllaceae | Bu |
| Cervantesia | Vicente Cervantes (1755–1829) | Santalaceae | Bu |
| Cespedesia | Juan María Céspedes (1776–1848), Colombian clergyman and professor of botany in Bogotá; founded the botanical garden there | Ochnaceae | Qu |
| Cevallia | Pedro Cevallos (1760–1840), diplomat | Loasaceae | Bu |
| Chadsia | Henry Ducie Chads (1788–1868), naval officer | Fabaceae | Bu |
| Chaloupkaea | Marek Chaloupka (20th and 21st century), Czech horticulturalist and photographer who worked with the author of the genus | Crassulaceae | Bu |
| Chamaesaracha | Isidoro Saracha (1733–1803), Spanish monk, apothecary and botanist at the Abbey of Santo Domingo de Silos | Solanaceae | Bu |
| Chambeyronia | Léon Chambeyron (1827–1891), French ship commander of a botanical expedition | Arecaceae | St |
| Chamissoa | Adelbert von Chamisso (1781–1838) | Amaranthaceae | Bu |
| Championia | John George Champion (1815–1854) | Gesneriaceae | Bu |
| Chandrasekharania | N. Chandrasekharan Nair, Hindi scholar | Poaceae | Bu |
| Changiostyrax | Ho Tseng Chang (b. 1898), Chinese professor and curator of the herbarium at Sun Yat-sen University | Styracaceae | Bu |
| Changnienia | Chang Nien Chen (20th century); worked at the biological research institute at Academia Sinica; collected plants around Nanjing | Orchidaceae | Qu |
| Chapelieria | Louis Armand Chapelier (1779–1806), French botanist and naturalist who collected plants on Madagascar | Rubiaceae | Bu |
| Chapmannia | Alvan Wentworth Chapman (1809–1899) | Fabaceae | Bu |
| Chaptalia | Jean-Antoine Chaptal (1756–1832) | Asteraceae | Bu |
| Chardinia | Jean Chardin (1643–1713), explorer | Asteraceae | St |
| Charpentiera | Arsène Charpentier (1781–1818), French apothecary and professor of pharmacology in Antwerp | Amaranthaceae | Bu |
| Chasechloa | Mary Agnes Chase (1869–1963) | Poaceae | Bu |
| Chassalia | François de Chazal de la Genesté (1731–1795), French nobleman who settled on Mauritius in 1763 as a planter | Rubiaceae | Bu |
| Chaubardia | Louis Athanase Chaubard (1781–1854) | Orchidaceae | Bu |
| Chaubardiella | Louis Athanase Chaubard (1781–1854) | Orchidaceae | Bu |
| Chautemsia | Alain Chautems (born in Geneva) | Gesneriaceae | Bu |
| Chayamaritia | Kongkanda Chayamarit (b. 1952), Thai botanist; director of the Queen Sirikit Botanic Garden | Gesneriaceae | Bu |
| Cherleria | Johann Heinrich Cherler (1570–1610), Swiss botanist and court doctor in Montbéliard | Caryophyllaceae | Qu |
| Chesneya | Francis Rawdon Chesney (1789–1872), explorer | Fabaceae | Bu |
| Chevalierella | Auguste Chevalier (1873–1956) | Poaceae | Bu |
| Chevreulia | Michel Eugène Chevreul (1786–1889), chemist | Asteraceae | Bu |
| Cheyniana | George Cheyne (1790–1869) and (wife) Grizzel Cheyne (1797–1871), settlers | Myrtaceae | Bu |
| Chiangiodendron | Fernando Chiang Cabrera (b. 1943), Mexican botanist | Achariaceae | Bu |
| Chidlowia | Chidlow Vigne (1900–1948), British forester; collected plants in Ghana and Malawi | Fabaceae | Qu |
| Chieniodendron | Sung Shu Chien (1883–1965), Chinese director of the botanical institute of the Chinese Academy of Sciences | Annonaceae | Bu |
| Choisya | Jacques Denys Choisy (1799–1859) | Rutaceae | Co |
| Chomelia | Pierre-Jean-Baptiste Chomel (1671–1740), French botanist and personal physician to Louis XV | Rubiaceae | Qu |
| Chouxia | Pierre Choux (1890–1983), French director of the botanical garden in Caen; professor of botany at the University of Montpellier | Sapindaceae | Bu |
| Christia | Johann Ludwig Christ (1739–1813) | Fabaceae | Bu |
| Christiana | Christen Smith (1785–1816) | Malvaceae | Bu |
| Christianella | Christiane Eva Anderson (b. 1944), American botanist | Malpighiaceae | Bu |
| Christisonia | Robert Christison (1797–1882), doctor | Orobanchaceae | Bu |
| Christolea | Marie Gabriel Jules Christol (1802–1861), French geologist and palaeontologist in Marseille and Montpellier | Brassicaceae | Bu |
| Chunia | Woon Young Chun (1890–1971), Chinese professor of botany at Sun Yat-sen University; director of its Institute of Agricultural and Forestry Botany; later at the Arnold Arboretum at Harvard University | Hamamelidaceae | Bu |
| Chuniophoenix | Woon Young Chun (1890–1971), Chinese professor of botany at Sun Yat-sen University; director of its Institute of Agricultural and Forestry Botany; later at the Arnold Arboretum at Harvard University | Arecaceae | Bu |
| Ciceronia | Cicero (106 BC – 43 BC), orator | Asteraceae | Bu |
| Cienfuegosia | Bernardo de Cienfuegos (1580–1640), Spanish doctor and botanist | Malvaceae | Qu |
| Cinchona | Ana de Osorio (1599–1625), wife of Luis Jerónimo de Cabrera, 4th Count of Chinchón | Rubiaceae | St |
| Cischweinfia | Charles Schweinfurth (1890–1970) | Orchidaceae | Bu |
| Clappertonia | Hugh Clapperton (1788–1827), explorer | Malvaceae | Bu |
| Clappia | Asahel Clapp (1792–1862), American botanist in New Albany in Indiana | Asteraceae | Bu |
| Clarisia | Miguel Barnades y Claris (1750–1801), Spanish doctor and professor of botany at the botanical garden in Madrid; son of Miguel Barnades | Moraceae | Qu |
| Clarkella | Charles Baron Clarke (1832–1906) | Rubiaceae | Bu |
| Clarkia | William Clark (1770–1838), explorer | Onagraceae | Co |
| Clausena | Peder Claussøn Friis (1545–1614), historian | Rutaceae | St |
| Clausia | Karl Ernst Claus (1796–1864) | Brassicaceae | Bu |
| Clavija | José de Viera y Clavijo (1731–1813) | Primulaceae | St |
| Claytonia | John Clayton (1694/5–1773) | Montiaceae | St |
| Cleghornia | Hugh Cleghorn (1820–1895) | Apocynaceae | Bu |
| Cleobulia | Cleobulus (6th century BC), poet | Fabaceae | Bu |
| Clermontia | Aimé, duc de Clermont-Tonnerre (1779–1865) | Campanulaceae | Bu |
| Cleyera | Andreas Cleyer (1634–1697 or 1698) | Pentaphylacaceae | Co |
| Clidemia | Cleidemus (fifth or fourth century BCE), historian | Melastomataceae | Bu |
| Cliffortia | George Clifford III (1685–1760) | Rosaceae | St |
| Cliftonia | William Clifton (b. 1698), 18th-century American lawyer in Georgia | Cyrillaceae | St |
| Clintonia | DeWitt Clinton (1769–1828) | Liliaceae | St |
| Clivia | Charlotte Percy (1787–1866), née Clive, duchess | Amaryllidaceae | Co |
| Cloezia | François Stanislas Cloez (1817–1883) | Myrtaceae | Bu |
| Cloiselia | J. Cloisel (fl. 1891); collected this plant on Madagascar, in part with George Francis Scott Elliot | Asteraceae | Bu |
| Clowesia | John Clowes (1777–1846), English clergyman and orchid grower in or near Manchester | Orchidaceae | Qu |
| Clusia | Carolus Clusius (1526–1609) | Clusiaceae | Bu |
| Clusiella | Carolus Clusius (1526–1609) | Calophyllaceae | Bu |
| Clutia | Outgert Cluyt (1577–1636), Dutch doctor, entomologist and botanist at the botanical garden in Leiden | Peraceae | Qu |
| Cobaea | Bernabé Cobo (1582–1657) | Polemoniaceae | Co |
| Coddia | Leslie Codd (1908–1999) | Rubiaceae | Bu |
| Coespeletia | José Manuel de Ezpeleta, 1st Count of Ezpeleta de Beire (1739–1823) | Asteraceae | Bu |
| Cogniauxia | Alfred Cogniaux (1841–1916) | Cucurbitaceae | Bu |
| Coincya | Auguste-Henri de Coincy (1837–1903) | Brassicaceae | Bu |
| Coldenia | Cadwallader Colden (1688–1776) | Boraginaceae | Bu |
| Colea | Galbraith Lowry Cole (1772–1842), army officer | Bignoniaceae | Bu |
| Colebrookea | Henry Thomas Colebrooke (1765–1837), translator | Lamiaceae | Bu |
| Colignonia | Jean Nicolas Collignon (1762–?1788) | Nyctaginaceae | Bu |
| Collaea | Luigi Aloysius Colla (1766–1848) | Fabaceae | Bu |
| Colletia | Philibert Collet (1643–1718), French clergyman and teacher, and a fellow of the Royal Society of London | Rhamnaceae | Co |
| Collinsia | Zaccheus Collins (1764–1831), American botanist in Philadelphia | Plantaginaceae | Co |
| Collinsonia | Peter Collinson (1694–1768) | Lamiaceae | St |
| Cologania | Cólogan family members on Tenerife in the Canary Islands who supported various naturalists and explorers in the 18th and 19th centuries | Fabaceae | Bu |
| Colona | Christopher Columbus (1451–1506), explorer | Malvaceae | Bu |
| Colquhounia | Robert Colquhoun (1786–1838) | Lamiaceae | Co |
| Columellia | Columella (4 – c.70 AD) | Columelliaceae | Bu |
| Columnea | Fabio Colonna (1567–1640) | Gesneriaceae | Co |
| Colvillea | Charles Colville (1770–1843), army officer | Fabaceae | St |
| Combera | Harold Frederick Comber (1897–1969) | Solanaceae | Bu |
| Commelina | Jan (1629–1692), and his nephew Caspar Commelijn (1668–1731) | Commelinaceae | Co |
| Commersonia | Philibert Commerson (1727–1773) | Malvaceae | St |
| Comolia | Giuseppe Comolli (1780–1849), Italian professor of agriculture and botanist at the botanical garden in Pavia | Melastomataceae | Bu |
| Comoliopsis | Giuseppe Comolli (1780–1849), Italian professor of agriculture and botanist at the botanical garden in Pavia | Melastomataceae | Bu |
| Comparettia | Andrea Comparetti (1745–1801), Italian botanist | Orchidaceae | St |
| Comptonella | Robert Harold Compton (1886–1979) | Rutaceae | Bu |
| Comptonia | Henry Compton (1632–1713), bishop | Myricaceae | Co |
| Condalia | Antonio Condal, Spanish doctor and botanist; student of Pehr Löfling | Rhamnaceae | Qu |
| Condaminea | Charles Marie de La Condamine (1701–1774) | Rubiaceae | Bu |
| Connellia | Frederick Vavasour McConnell (1868–1914), English biologist (ornithologist); collected plants in Venezuela and Guyana | Bromeliaceae | Bu |
| Conradina | Solomon White Conrad (1779–1831), American mineralogist and botanist; later a professor of botany at the University of Pennsylvania | Lamiaceae | Qu |
| Conringia | Hermann Conring (1606–1681), doctor | Brassicaceae | Bu |
| Consolea | Michelangelo Console (1812–1897), Italian professor of botany at the botanical garden in Palermo; specialist in cactuses | Cactaceae | Qu |
| Constancea | Lincoln Constance (1909–2001) | Asteraceae | Bu |
| Constantia | Constança Eufrosina Barbosa Rodriguez da Borba Paca (1844–1920), wife and colleague of the Brazilian botanist João Barbosa Rodrigues | Orchidaceae | Qu |
| Conzattia | Cassiano Conzatti (1862–1951) | Fabaceae | Bu |
| Copernicia | Copernicus (1473– 1543), astronomer | Arecaceae | St |
| Corbichonia | Jean Corbichon (14th century), French monk, and a secretary and chaplain of Charles V; translated Bartholomeus Anglicus's encyclopedia into French | Lophiocarpaceae | Bu |
| Cordeauxia | Harry Cordeaux (1870–1943), colonial administrator | Fabaceae | Bu |
| Cordia | Euricius Cordus (1486–1535), and son Valerius Cordus (1515–1544) | Ehretiaceae | St |
| Cordiera | Louis Cordier (1777–1861) | Rubiaceae | Bu |
| Cornutia | Jacques-Philippe Cornut (1606–1651) | Lamiaceae | Bu |
| Correa | José Correia da Serra (1750–1823) | Rutaceae | Co |
| Corryocactus | Thomas Avery Corry (1862–1942), engineer in Peru who discovered these plants | Cactaceae | Qu |
| Corsia | Bardo Corsi Salviati (1844–1907), Italian nobleman with a large botanical park near Florence | Corsiaceae | Bu |
| Corsiopsis | Bardo Corsi Salviati (1844–1907), Italian nobleman with a large botanical park near Florence | Corsiaceae | Bt |
| Cortia | Bonaventura Corti (1729–1813), Italian naturalist and professor | Apiaceae | Qu |
| Cortiella | Bonaventura Corti (1729–1813), Italian naturalist and professor | Apiaceae | Bu |
| Cosmibuena | Francisco Antonio Cosme Bueno (1711–1798) | Rubiaceae | Bu |
| Cossinia | Joseph-François Charpentier de Cossigny (1736–1809) | Sapindaceae | Bu |
| Costera | Jan Constantijn Costerus (1849–1938), Dutch teacher and botanist in Amsterdam | Ericaceae | Bu |
| Cottea | Georg von Cotta (1796–1863), German publisher and diplomat; supporter of science | Poaceae | Bu |
| Cottendorfia | Georg von Cotta (1796–1863), German publisher and diplomat; supporter of science | Bromeliaceae | Bu |
| Cottonia | Frederic Conyers Cotton (1807–1901), British military officer in present-day Chennai; collected plants and grew orchids | Orchidaceae | Bu |
| Coulterella | John Merle Coulter (1851–1928) | Asteraceae | Bu |
| Coulteria | Thomas Coulter (1793–1843) | Fabaceae | Bu |
| Coulterophytum | John Merle Coulter (1851–1928) | Apiaceae | Bu |
| Coursetia | Georges Louis Marie Dumont de Courset (1746–1824) | Fabaceae | Bu |
| Cousinia | Victor Cousin (1792–1867), philosopher | Asteraceae | Bu |
| Cousiniopsis | Victor Cousin (1792–1867), philosopher | Asteraceae | Bu |
| Coutaportla | Margaret Bentinck, Duchess of Portland (1715–1785) | Rubiaceae | Bu |
| Cowiea | William Cowie (1849–1910), merchant | Rubiaceae | Bu |
| Crabbea | George Crabbe (1754–1832), poet | Acanthaceae | Bu |
| Craibia | William Grant Craib (1882–1933) | Fabaceae | Bu |
| Craibiodendron | William Grant Craib (1882–1933) | Ericaceae | Bu |
| Craigia | William Craig (1832–1922) | Malvaceae | Bu |
| Crantzia | Heinrich Johann Nepomuk von Crantz (1722–1799) | Gesneriaceae | Bu |
| Crateva | Crateuas (100 BC.) | Capparaceae | Bu |
| Cratylia | Cratylus (mid-late 5th century BCE), philosopher | Fabaceae | Bu |
| Crawfurdia | John Crawfurd (1783–1868), doctor and historian | Gentianaceae | Bu |
| Cremersia | Georges Cremers (b. 1936), French curator at the herbarium in Cayenne, French Guiana | Gesneriaceae | Bu |
| Crepinella | François Crépin (1830–1903) | Araliaceae | Bu |
| Crescentia | Pietro de' Crescenzi (c. 1230/35 – c. 1320) | Bignoniaceae | St |
| Criscia | Jorge Víctor Crisci (b. 1945), Argentinian professor of botany at the National University of La Plata | Asteraceae | Bu |
| Cristonia | Michael Crisp (b. 1950) and Peter Weston (b. 1956) | Fabaceae | Bu |
| Critonia | Criton of Heraclea (c. 100 AD) | Asteraceae | Bu |
| Critoniadelphus | Criton of Heraclea (c. 100 AD) | Asteraceae | Bu |
| Critoniella | Criton of Heraclea (c. 100 AD) | Asteraceae | Bu |
| Critoniopsis | Criton of Heraclea (c. 100 AD) | Asteraceae | Bu |
| Croatiella | Thomas Croat (b. 1938) | Araceae | Bu |
| Croizatia | Léon Croizat (1894–1982) | Phyllanthaceae | Bu |
| Croninia | Mary Ann Cronin (1871–1974) and her father Michael Cronin (1842–1931), Australian farmers who collected plants between Perth and Albany for Ferdinand von Mueller | Ericaceae | Bu |
| Cronquistianthus | Arthur Cronquist (1919–1992) | Asteraceae | Bu |
| Croomia | Hardy Bryan Croom (1797–1837), American lawyer and botanist who wrote about plants around New Bern, North Carolina, and established Goodwood Plantation in Florida | Stemonaceae | Bu |
| Crowea | James Crowe (c. 1750 – 1807) | Rutaceae | St |
| Crudia | Johann Wilhelm Crudy (1753 – before 1793), German doctor near Erlangen; worked and collected plants in the Caribbean; sent his plant collection to the author of the genus | Fabaceae | Bu |
| Crusea | Wilhelm Cruse (1803–1873), Baltic German doctor, botanist and professor of pharmacology at the University of Königsberg | Rubiaceae | Qu |
| Cuatrecasanthus | José Cuatrecasas (1903–1996) | Asteraceae | Bu |
| Cuatrecasasiella | José Cuatrecasas (1903–1996) | Asteraceae | Bu |
| Cuatresia | José Cuatrecasas (1903–1996) | Solanaceae | Bu |
| Cuenotia | Lucien Cuénot (1866–1951) | Acanthaceae | Bu |
| Cuervea | José Romualdo Cuervo Rubiano (1801–1861), Colombian clergyman, naturalist and geographer who maintained his own botanical garden | Celastraceae | Bu |
| Cuitlauzina | Cuitláhuac (c. 1476–1520), emperor | Orchidaceae | Bu |
| Cullen | William Cullen (1710–1790) | Fabaceae | Bu |
| Cullenia | William Cullen (1710–1790) | Malvaceae | Bu |
| Cullumia | John Cullum, 6th Baronet (1733–1785) | Asteraceae | Bu |
| Cuminia | Ugo Maria Cumino (1762–1808/1812), Italian clergyman and botanist (mycologist) | Lamiaceae | Bu |
| Cunninghamia | James Cunninghame (d. around 1709), Scottish naturalist and East India Company surgeon, and for Allan Cunningham | Cupressaceae | Qu |
| Cunonia | Johann Christian Cuno (1708–1783) | Cunoniaceae | Bu |
| Cupania | Francesco Cupani (1657–1710) | Sapindaceae | St |
| Cupaniopsis | Francesco Cupani (1657–1710) | Sapindaceae | Bu |
| Curio | Gaius Scribonius Curio (c.124–53 BC) | Asteraceae | Bt |
| Curtia | Kurt Polycarp Joachim Sprengel (1766–1833) | Gentianaceae | Bu |
| Curtisia | William Curtis (1746–1799) | Curtisiaceae | Bu |
| Cusickiella | William Conklin Cusick (1842–1922) | Brassicaceae | Bu |
| Cussetia | Colette Cusset (b. 1944) and her husband Gérard Henri Jean Cusset (1936–2010), French botanists; she was a professor at the National Museum of Natural History | Podostemaceae | Bu |
| Cussonia | Pierre Cusson (1727–1783) | Araliaceae | Bu |
| Cutandia | Vicente Cutanda y Jarauta (1804–1866), Spanish director of the botanical garden in Madrid | Poaceae | Qu |
| Cuttsia | Jane (Thorpe) Cutts (1836–1891), English-born Australian who helped search for Ludwig Leichhardt, a German naturalist who disappeared in the Outback | Rousseaceae | Bu |
| Cuviera | Georges Cuvier (1769–1832) | Rubiaceae | Bu |
| Cypringlea | Cyrus Pringle (1838–1911) | Cyperaceae | Bu |
| Cyrilla | Domenico Cirillo (1739–1799) | Cyrillaceae | St |
| Cyrillopsis | Domenico Cirillo (1739–1799) | Ixonanthaceae | Bu |

== See also ==
- List of plant genus names with etymologies: A–C, D–K, L–P, Q–Z
- List of plant family names with etymologies
