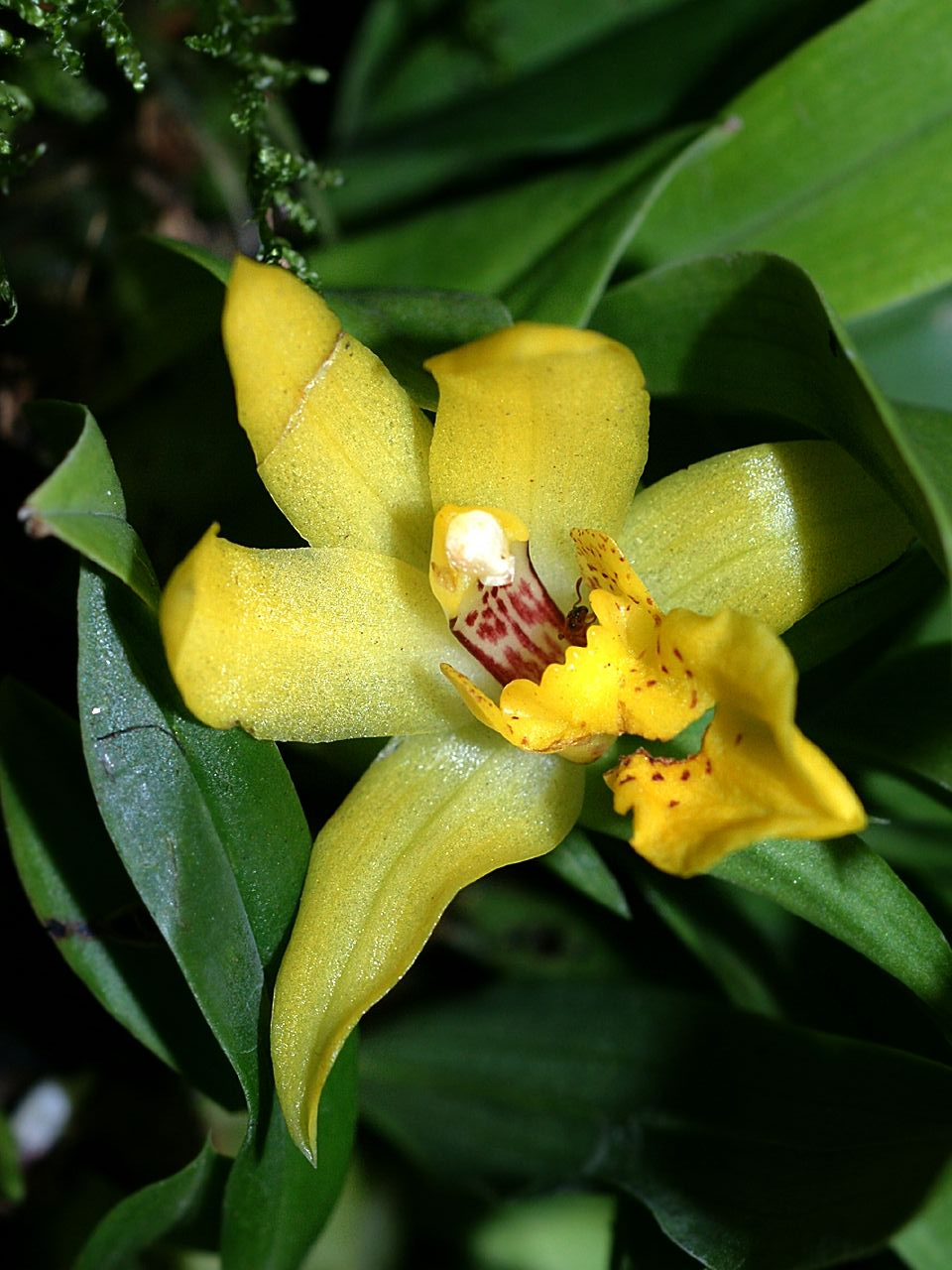
- Promenaea xanthina

Scientific classification
- Kingdom: Plantae
- Clade: Embryophytes
- Clade: Tracheophytes
- Clade: Spermatophytes
- Clade: Angiosperms
- Clade: Monocots
- Order: Asparagales
- Family: Orchidaceae
- Subfamily: Epidendroideae
- Tribe: Cymbidieae
- Subtribe: Zygopetalinae
- Genus: Promenaea; Lindl.

= Promenaea =

Genus of orchids

Promenaea is a genus of flowering plants from the orchid family, Orchidaceae. It contains 18 currently accepted species (including one that is apparently extinct), all endemic to Brazil.

== Species ==
- Promenaea acuminata Schltr.
- Promenaea albescens Schltr. - São Paulo, Paraná
- Promenaea catharinensis Schltr. - Santa Catarina
- Promenaea dusenii Schltr. - Paraná
- Promenaea fuerstenbergiana Schltr. - Santa Catarina
- Promenaea guttata (Rchb.f.) Rchb.f.
- Promenaea lentiginosa (Lindl.) Lindl.
- Promenaea malmquistiana Schltr.†
- Promenaea microptera Rchb.f.
- Promenaea nigricans Königer & J.G.Weinm.bis - Paraná
- Promenaea ovatiloba (Klinge) Cogn. in C.F.P.von Martius
- Promenaea paranaensis Schltr. - Paraná
- Promenaea riograndensis Schltr. - Rio Grande do Sul
- Promenaea rollissonii (Lindl.) Lindl.
- Promenaea silvana F.Barros & Cath. - Bahia
- Promenaea sincorana P.Castro & Campacci - Bahia
- Promenaea stapelioides (Link & Otto) Lindl.
- Promenaea xanthina (Lindl.) Lindl.

== Hybrids ==
Hybrids of orchids in Promenaea with orchids in other genera are placed in the following nothogenera:

- Alantuckerara (Atc.) = Neogardneria × Promenaea × Zygopetalum
- Berlinerara (Brln.) = Aganisia × Batemannia × Otostylis × Promenaea × Zygopetalum × Zygosepalum
- Brianara (Brn.) = Galeottia × Pabstia × Promenaea × Zygopetalum
- Clowesetenaea (Cws.) = Catasetum × Clowesia × Promenaea
- Cymbidinaea (Cbn.) = Cymbidium × Promenaea
- Cyrtonaea (Ctea.) = Cyrtopodium × Promenaea
- Fisherara (Fsh.) = Neogardneria × Pabstia × Promenaea × Zygopetalum
- Galeomenetalum (Gle.) = Galeottia × Promenaea × Zygopetalum
- Hoosierara (Hos.) = Promenaea × Warrea × Zygopetalum
- Johnara (Jon.) = Cochleanthes × Pabstia × Promenaea × Zygopetalum
- Kanzerara (Kza.) = Chondrorhyncha × Promenaea × Zygopetalum
- Maccorquodaleara (Mcq.) = Aganisia × Batemannia × Cochleanthes × Otostylis × Pabstia × Promenaea × Zygopetalum × Zygosepalum
- Mauriceara (Mrc.) = Aganisia × Batemannia × Otostylis × Pabstia × Promenaea × Zygopetalum × Zygosepalum
- Miloara (Mlr.) = Miltonia × Pabstia × Promenaea × Zygopetalum
- Procaste (Prte.) = Lycaste × Promenaea
- Prochaea (Poha.) = Dichaea × Promenaea
- Promadisanthus (Pmds.) = Paradisanthus × Promenaea
- Promarrea (Pmar.) = Promenaea × Warrea
- Promcidium (Pcd.) = Oncidium × Promenaea
- Promellia (Pmla.) = Ansellia × Promenaea
- Promenabstia (Pmb.) = Pabstia × Promenaea
- Promenanthes (Prths.) = Cochleanthes × Promenaea
- Promenopsis (Pmp.) = Eriopsis × Promenaea
- Promenzella (Pmz.) = Promenaea × Warczewiczella
- Promoglossum (Pgl.) = Promenaea × Rossioglossum
- Promosepalum (Prsm.) = Promenaea × Zygosepalum
- Propabstopetalum (Pbt.) = Pabstia × Promenaea × Zygopetalum
- Propescapetalum (Pop.) = Pescatoria × Promenaea × Zygopetalum
- Propetalum (Pptm.) = Promenaea × Zygopetalum
- Robinstevensara (Rsv.) = Cochleanthes × Promenaea × Zygopetalum
- Rosstuckerara (Rsk.) = Aganisia × Batemannia × Otostylis × Pabstia × Promenaea × Warczewiczella × Zygopetalum × Zygosepalum
- Warszewiczara (Wwz.) = Pabstia × Promenaea × Warczewiczella × Zygopetalum
- Williampriceara (Wmp.) = Anguloa × Lycaste × Pabstia × Promenaea × Zygopetalum
- Zygomenzella (Zmz.) = Promenaea × Warczewiczella × Zygopetalum

== See also ==
- List of Orchidaceae genera
