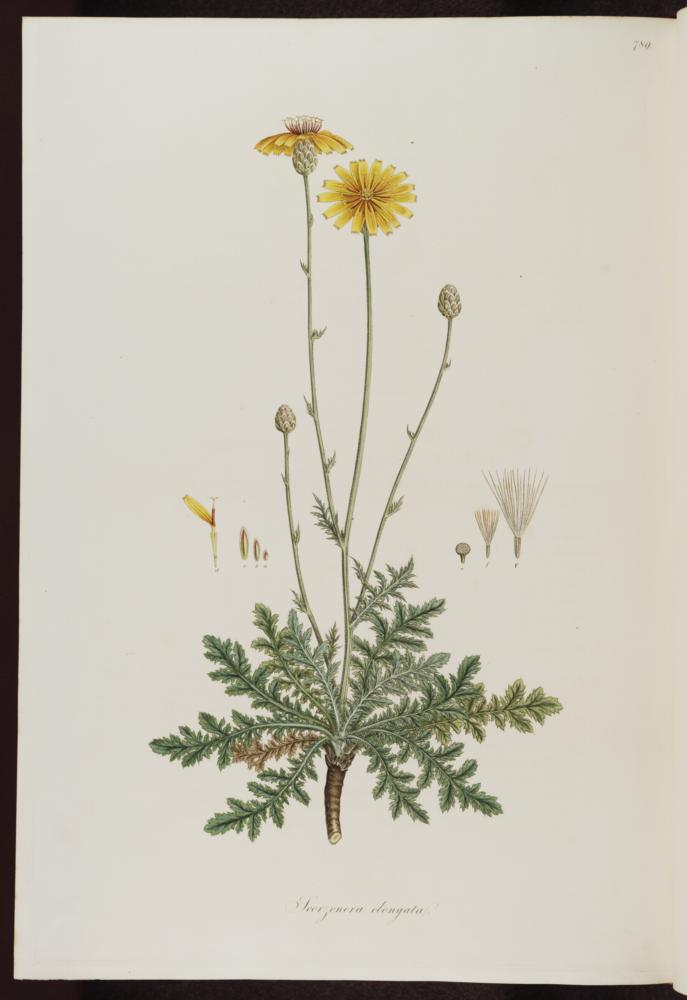

Scientific classification
- Kingdom: Plantae
- Clade: Tracheophytes
- Clade: Angiosperms
- Clade: Eudicots
- Clade: Asterids
- Order: Asterales
- Family: Asteraceae
- Genus: Hymenonema
- Species: H. graecum

Binomial name
- Hymenonema graecum (L.)DC.

Synonyms
- Catananche graeca L. non Bory & Chaub.

= Hymenonema graecum =

Species of flowering plant

Hymenonema graecum is a perennial herbaceous plant of 20–70 cm, that rests with its buds at or just under the surface of the soil (a so-called hemicryptophyte). The Greek vernacular name is Αδραλίδα (Adralida), meaning "handsome Lida". The leaves are pinnate, and may be up to 1 cm wide. The ligulate flowers are yellow. The species is an endemic of Greece.

== Description ==
Hymenonema graecum is a perennial herb with glandular, rough but softly hairy shoots. It has twenty chromosomes (2n = 20). The rosette consists of pinnately lobed leaves, the end-lobe largest, oval, with a rounded tip, and segments often with teeth. Few small leaves on the stem are slightly pinnate and linear further up. The plant is of average height (20–70 cm). It usually has 1-3 yellow inflorescences (heads) per stem, each on a peduncle of 10–30 cm. The narrow yellow ligulate florets with five short teeth at the tip sometimes have a whitish base, the tube being hairy. The fruits (or cypselas) are 4–5 mm long and stiffly hairy, and are topped by 12–14 mm long pappus scales. The hairless involucre consists of hairless, cartilaginous bracts (or phyllaries) with papery, sometimes serrated edges. Those on the outside are oval, the inner phyllaries are narrower.

=== Differences with related species ===
The genus Hymenonema contains two species, H. laconicum, which is known from the southern Peloponnesos and H. graecum. H. graecum has yellow florets with yellow anther tubes, which sit on 3½-5 mm long and ¾-1¾ mm thick, sparsely hairy cypselas, encircled by pappus that differs maximally 5 mm in length, and basal leaves with a narrow top segment of usually 3–10 mm. H. laconicum differs in having yolk yellow ligulate florets with a purple spot at the base and dark purple anther tubes, which sit on 4¾-6 mm long and 1½-2 mm wide cypselas and the pappus differing 8–15 mm in length, and basal leaves with a broader top segment of 10–35 mm wide.

== Taxonomy ==
Catananche graeca was described in 1753 by Carl Linnaeus, based on a specimen from the Cyclades. In 1817 Henri Cassini described Hymenonema tournefortii, which is now considered a synonym of Catananche graeca L.. In 1838 Augustin Pyramus de Candolle moved the species to Cassini's genus, recombining it with Linnaeus' epithet to Hymenonema graecum.

Confusingly, and also in 1838, Jean Baptiste Bory de Saint-Vincent and Louis Athanase Chaubard in their Nouvelle Flore du Péloponèse et des Cyclades described Catananche graeca, but now based on a specimen from the Peloponnesos. Pierre Edmond Boissier and Theodor von Heldreich realised that the plants described by Linnaeus and by Bory and Chaubard, belonged to related but different species, therefore the last assigned name was no longer available, and hence invalid. They proposed a new name for it, Hymenonema laconium, which they published in 1875.

== Distribution and habitat ==
This species is endemic to Greece, and is only known from the Cyclades and doubtfully from western Crete. It grows on rocky soils, under scrubs, in dry meadows, along roads and at the seaside. The species is tolerant to moderately increased salinity.
