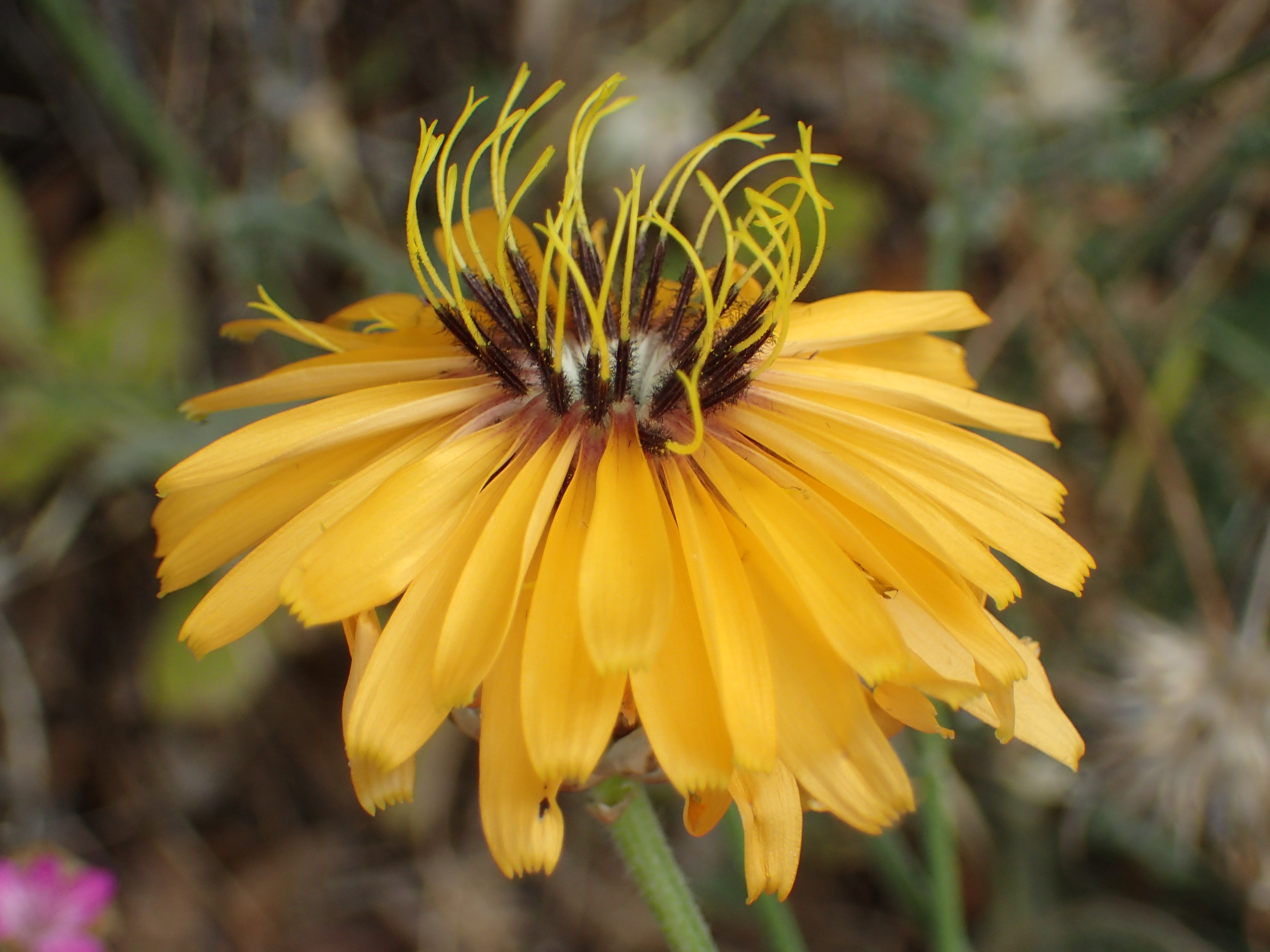

Scientific classification
- Kingdom: Plantae
- Clade: Embryophytes
- Clade: Tracheophytes
- Clade: Angiosperms
- Clade: Eudicots
- Clade: Asterids
- Order: Asterales
- Family: Asteraceae
- Genus: Hymenonema
- Species: H. laconicum

Binomial name
- Hymenonema laconicum Boiss. & Heldr.

Synonyms
- Catananche graeca Bory & Chaub. non L.

= Hymenonema laconicum =

Species of flowering plant

Hymenonema laconicum is a species of herbaceous perennial plant in the Asteraceae family. It is small to average height, with a rosette of greyish pinnately segmented leaves, and little branching solid stems carrying one to three heads of orange or yolk yellow ray-flowers, with a purple anther tube, and scaly pappus. The species is an endemic of the central and south-eastern Peloponnesos, and flowers in May and June.

== Description ==
Hymenonema laconium is a perennial herbaceous plant of 20–70 cm (7.9–27.6 in) high, with minute pale glandular hairs and longer hairs without glands. The number chromosomes is twenty (2n = 20). Both surfaces of the leaves are densely set with rigid hairs pressed to their surface. The leaves in the basal roset are 7–25 cm (2.8–9.8 in) long and pinnately segmented, sometimes with teeth at the margin. The top segment is larger than the lateral segments, and 1½-3 cm wide, or sometimes a little as 1 cm. Between one and six smaller leaves are distanced along the stem, the lowest pinnately segmented, the higher increasingly simple, small and narrow. Each stem carries between one and three flowerheads. The involucre is 1.5–2.5 cm (0.6–1.0 in) high and 1.5–2.25 cm (0.59–0.89 in) wide, with the individual bracts without hair, ovate to oblong-ovate in shape, with a rounded tip and an entire or dentate margin. The pits in the common base of the florets (called the receptacle) are each circled by a row of long hairs. The fruits (or cypselas) are 4–5 mm high and topped by the changed calyx called pappus. On the outer cypselas the pappus takes the shape of trifid scales, the middle branch of which is prolonged as a rigid hair. On the inner cypselas, there is a row of rigid hairs encircling a row of lanceolate scales that change at the tip into a rigid hair.

=== Differences with related species ===
The genus Hymenonema contains two species, H. graecum, that is known from the Cyclades, and H. laconicum. H. graecum has yellow ligulate florets with yellow anther tubes, which sit on 3½–5 mm long and ¾-1¾ mm thick, sparsely hairy cypselas, encircled by pappus that differs maximally 5 mm in length, and basal leaves with a narrow top segment of usually 3–10 mm. H. laconicum differs in having yolk yellow ligulate florets with a purple spot at the base and dark purple anther tubes, which sit on 4¾–6 mm long and 1½–2 mm wide densely hairy cypselas and the pappus differing 8–15 mm in length, and basal leaves with a wide top segment of 10–35 mm wide.

== Taxonomy ==
Catananche graeca was described in 1753 by Carl Linnaeus, based on a specimen from the Cyclades. In 1817 Henri Cassini described Hymenonema tournefortii, which is now considered a synonym of Catananche graeca L.. In 1838 Augustin Pyramus de Candolle moved the species to Cassini's genus, recombining it with Linnaeus' epithet to Hymenonema graecum. Also in 1838, Jean Baptiste Bory de Saint-Vincent and Louis Athanase Chaubard in their Nouvelle Flore du Péloponèse et des Cyclades described Catananche graeca, but now based on a specimen from the Peloponnesos. Pierre Edmond Boissier and Theodor von Heldreich realised that the plants described by Linnaeus and by Bory and Chaubard, belonged to related but different species, therefore the last assigned name was no longer available, and hence invalid. They proposed a new name for it, Hymenonema laconium, which they published in 1875.

== Distribution and habitat ==
Hymenonema laconicum is limited to the central and south-eastern Peloponnesos, in particular the Mainalo, Parnon and Taygetos mountains and the surrounding lowlands. It grows at altitudes of 5–1,300 m (16–4,265 ft) in shrubland on stony soils, field margins and meadows.
