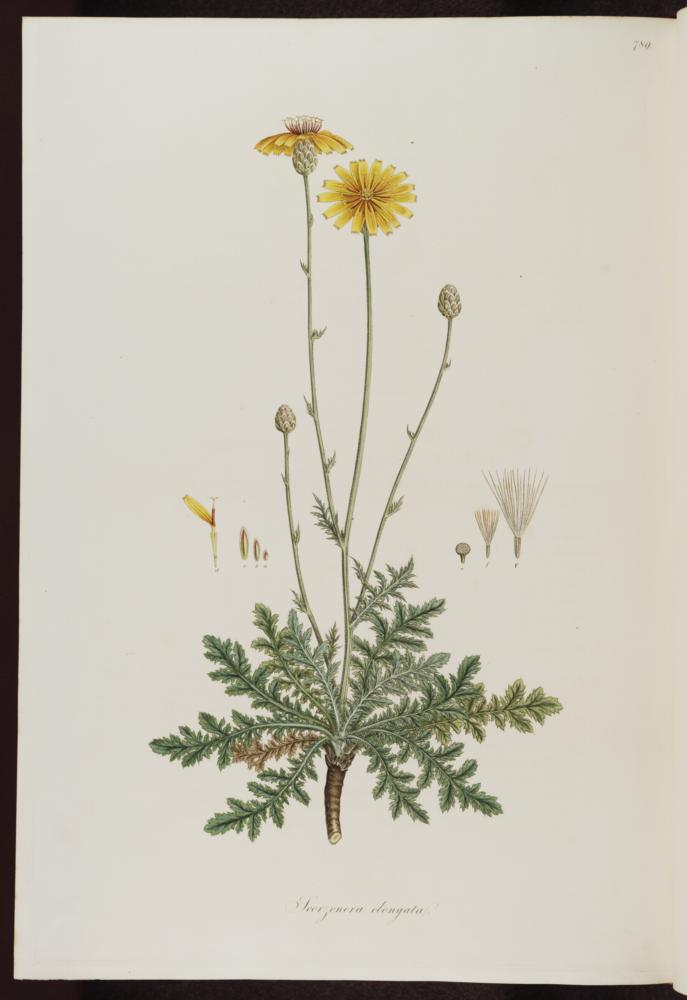

Scientific classification
- Kingdom: Plantae
- Clade: Tracheophytes
- Clade: Angiosperms
- Clade: Eudicots
- Clade: Asterids
- Order: Asterales
- Family: Asteraceae
- Subfamily: Cichorioideae
- Tribe: Cichorieae
- Subtribe: Scolyminae
- Genus: Hymenonema; Cass.

Type species
- Catananche graeca L.

Species
- Hymenonema graecum; Hymenonema laconicum

= Hymenonema =

Genus of flowering plants

Hymenonema is a genus of flowering plants in the family Asteraceae endemic to Greece. On each of the single or few stems, the species have one to three flowerheads consisting of yellow or yolk yellow ligulate florets, scaly pappus, greyish, pinnately segmented leaves in a basal rosette, and few smaller leaves on the 20–70 cm high stems. It contains two species: Hymenonema graecum, that is known from the Cyclades, and Hymenonema laconicum, which occurs in the central and south-eastern Peloponnesos.

== Description ==
Both Hymenonema species are herbaceous perennial plants, with short glandular hairs, and a basal rosettes of pinnately segmented leaves that appears greyish due to longer hairs without glands that are pressed to the leaf surfaces. Plants may have one or few solid stems with zero to two branches, carrying few smaller leaves, the lowest pinnately segmented, and the higher increasingly simple, small and narrow. Each branch carries one flowerhead at its tip. The flowerhead consist of several overlapping rows of involucral bracts, with papery margins. The common base of the florets (or receptacle) is pitted, and carries scales near its margin. The ligulate florets are yellow and have five triangular teeth at their tip. The fruits (or cypselas) are five-angled and carry few or many rigid, appressed hairs. The cypselas are topped by the changed calyx called pappus, which consists of rigid hairs and scales in 2-3 rows, or sometimes only of scales.

== Taxonomy ==
The earliest species that is now assigned to Hymenonema was from the Cyclades and described in 1753 by Carl Linnaeus as Catananche graeca. In 1817 Henri Cassini described Hymenonema tournefortii, which is now considered a synonym of Catananche graeca L.. In 1838 Augustin Pyramus de Candolle considered C. graeca was too deviant to remain in Catananche and moved the species to Cassini's genus, recombining it with Linnaeus' epithet to Hymenonema graecum. Also in 1838, Jean Baptiste Bory de Saint-Vincent and Louis Athanase Chaubard in their Nouvelle Flore du Péloponèse et des Cyclades described Catananche graeca, but now based on a specimen from the Peloponnesos. Pierre Edmond Boissier and Theodor von Heldreich realised that the plants described by Linnaeus and by Bory and Chaubard, belonged to related but different species, therefore the last assigned name was no longer available, and hence invalid. They proposed a new name for it, Hymenonema laconium, which they published in 1875.

=== Phylogeny ===
According to recent genetic analyses, the genus Hymenonema is related to the genera Scolymus, Catananche and Gundelia. The latest common ancestor of both Hymenonema species is calculated to have occurred roughly 1.3 million years ago during the earlier Pleistocene. This results in the following relationship tree.

- subtribe Scolyminae
  - Gundelia
  - - Catananche
    - - Scolymus
      - - Hymenonema graecum
        - Hymenonema laconicum

=== Etymology ===
Hymenonema is the contraction of the Latin hymen, meaning "membrane", and nema, a word for "thread", "cloth", "weft", probably indicating the plant has membranous margins to the involucral bracts, or the receptacular bracts (or paleas), or the branches of the style.

== Distribution and habitat ==
Hymenonema graecum is only known from the Cyclades and doubtfully from western Crete. It grows on rocky soils, under scrubs, in dry meadows, along roads and at the seaside. H. laconicum is limited to the central and south-eastern Peloponnesos, in particular the Mainalo, Parnon and Taygetos mountains and the surrounding lowlands. It grows at altitudes of 5–1300 m in shrubland on stony soils, field margins and meadows.
