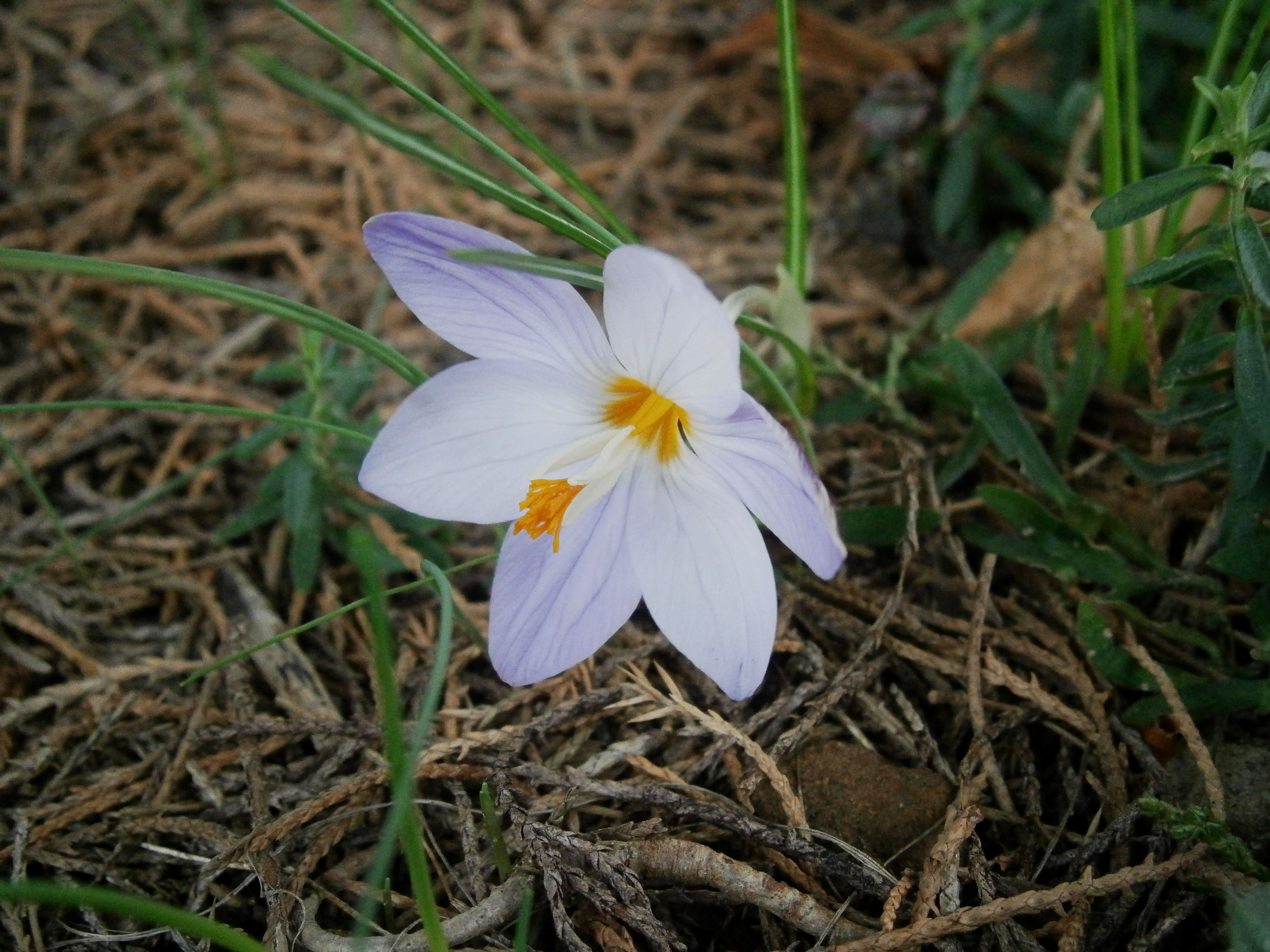

Scientific classification
- Kingdom: Plantae
- Clade: Tracheophytes
- Clade: Angiosperms
- Clade: Monocots
- Order: Asparagales
- Family: Iridaceae
- Genus: Crocus
- Species: C. laevigatus

Binomial name
- Crocus laevigatus Bory & Chaub.

= Crocus laevigatus =

Species of flowering plant

Crocus laevigatus, the smooth crocus, is a species of flowering plant in the genus Crocus of the family Iridaceae, endemic to Crete, Greece.

Growing to 10 cm (3.9 in), it is a cormous perennial, with narrow swordlike leaves and pale lilac or white flowers with a yellow centre, appearing in autumn. It has gained the Royal Horticultural Society's Award of Garden Merit.

The Latin specific epithet laevigatus means "smooth".
