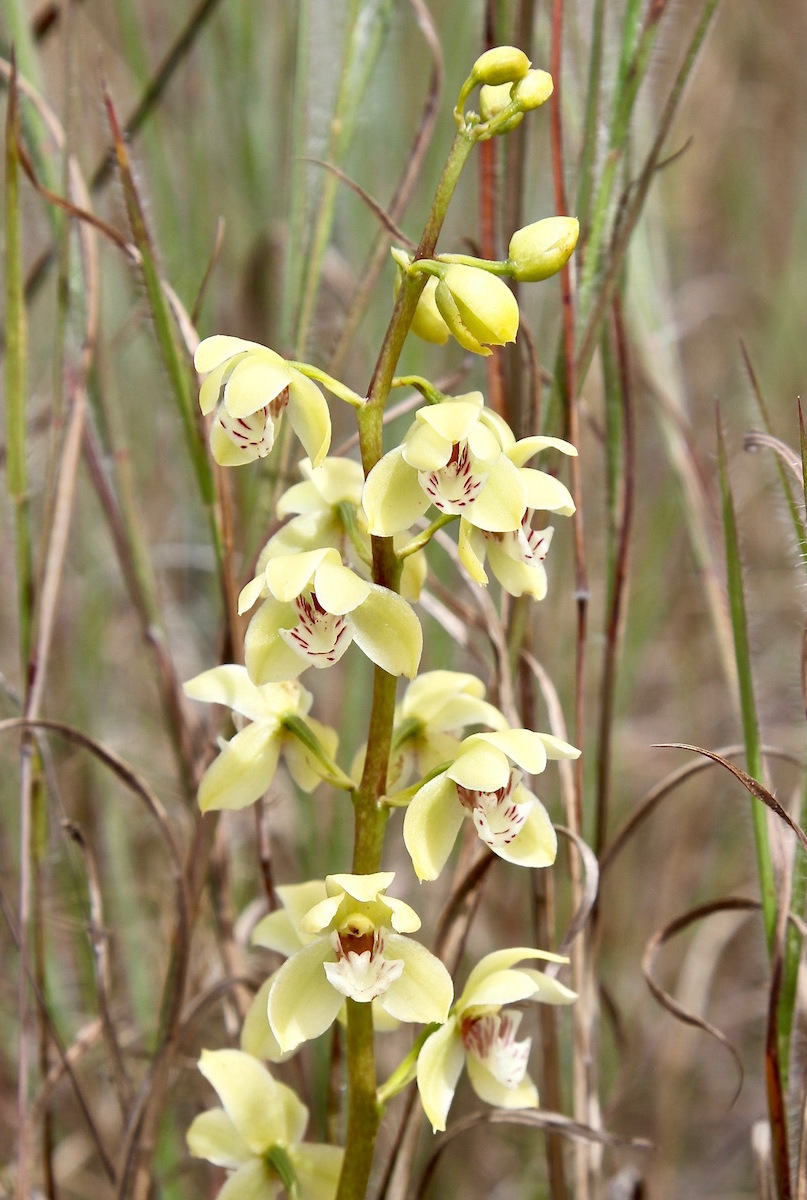
- Koellensteinia tricolor, Canaima

Scientific classification
- Kingdom: Plantae
- Clade: Tracheophytes
- Clade: Angiosperms
- Clade: Monocots
- Order: Asparagales
- Family: Orchidaceae
- Subfamily: Epidendroideae
- Tribe: Cymbidieae
- Subtribe: Zygopetalinae
- Genus: Koellensteinia; Rchb.f.

Type species
- Koellensteinia kellneriana Rchb.f.

= Koellensteinia =

Genus of orchids

Koellensteinia is a genus of flowering plants from the orchid family, Orchidaceae. It is named by Heinrich Gustav Reichenbach for the Captain Carl Kellner von Koellenstein, an Austrian military officer and a botanical correspondent of Reichenbach.

== Distribution and ecology ==
The genus contains about 19 species native to South America, Belize, Trinidad, and Puerto Rico. Terrestrial or epiphytic plants found in low to mid elevation, hill and mountain forests.

== Characteristics ==
Related to Zygopetalum. Stems short, leafy, usually forming pseudobulbs, 1- to 3-leaved. Leaves petiolate, linear to oblong, narrow, pleated, lightly veined. Inflorescence lateral, erect, slender, branched or unbranched, numerous to few-flowered. Flowers small to medium sized, fragrant, yellow or white, barred magenta, rose or violet and suffused pink on the outside. Sepals and petals subsimilar, free, spreading; lip trilobed with spreading or erect, small side lobes, a larger, broad midlobe that is entire or somewhat bilobed and has a bilobed, erect callus. Column with a conspicuous foot, very short, sometimes winged; pollinia 2 or 4.

== Cultivation ==
Require intermediate conditions, moderate shade, and high humidity. The plants can be grown potted in a free-draining bark mixture and should not be allowed to dry out completely for any length of time.

== Species ==
Currently 11 species are accepted:

1. Koellensteinia carraoensis Garay & Dunst. - Brazil North, French Guiana, Suriname, Venezuela
2. Koellensteinia dasilvae C.F.Hall & F.Barros - Brazil North
3. Koellensteinia eburnea (Barb.Rodr.) Schltr. - Bolivia, Brazil Southeast, Brazil West-Central
4. Koellensteinia florida (Rchb.f.) Garay - Brazil Northeast, Brazil Southeast
5. Koellensteinia graminea (Lindl.) Rchb.f. - Trinidad, Bolivia, Brazil North, Brazil Northeast, Colombia, Ecuador, French Guiana, Guyana, Peru, Suriname, Trinidad-Tobago, Venezuela
6. Koellensteinia hyacinthoides Schltr. - Brazil North, Colombia, Guyana, Suriname, Venezuela
7. Koellensteinia ionoptera Linden & Rchb.f. - Peru, Ecuador
8. Koellensteinia kellneriana Rchb.f. - Venezuela, French Guiana, Suriname, Colombia, Brazil North, Guyana
9. Koellensteinia lilijae Foldats - Panama, Venezuela
10. Koellensteinia spiralis Gomes Ferreira & L.C.Menezes - Bahia
11. Koellensteinia tricolor (Lindl.) Rchb.f. in W.G.Walpers - Belize, Guyana, Venezuela, Brazil North

== See also ==
- List of Orchidaceae genera
