= Hoehneella =

Scientific classification
- Kingdom: Plantae
- Clade: Tracheophytes
- Clade: Angiosperms
- Clade: Monocots
- Order: Asparagales
- Family: Orchidaceae
- Subfamily: Epidendroideae
- Tribe: Cymbidieae
- Subtribe: Zygopetalinae
- Genus: Hoehneella; Ruschi

Genus of orchids

Hoehneella is a genus of flowering plants from the orchid family, Orchidaceae. There are two known species, both endemic to Brazil. It is named after Brazilian botanist F. C. Hoehne.

- Hoehneella gehrtiana (Hoehne) Ruschi - São Paulo
- Hoehneella heloisae Ruschi - Espírito Santo

== See also ==
- List of Orchidaceae genera
