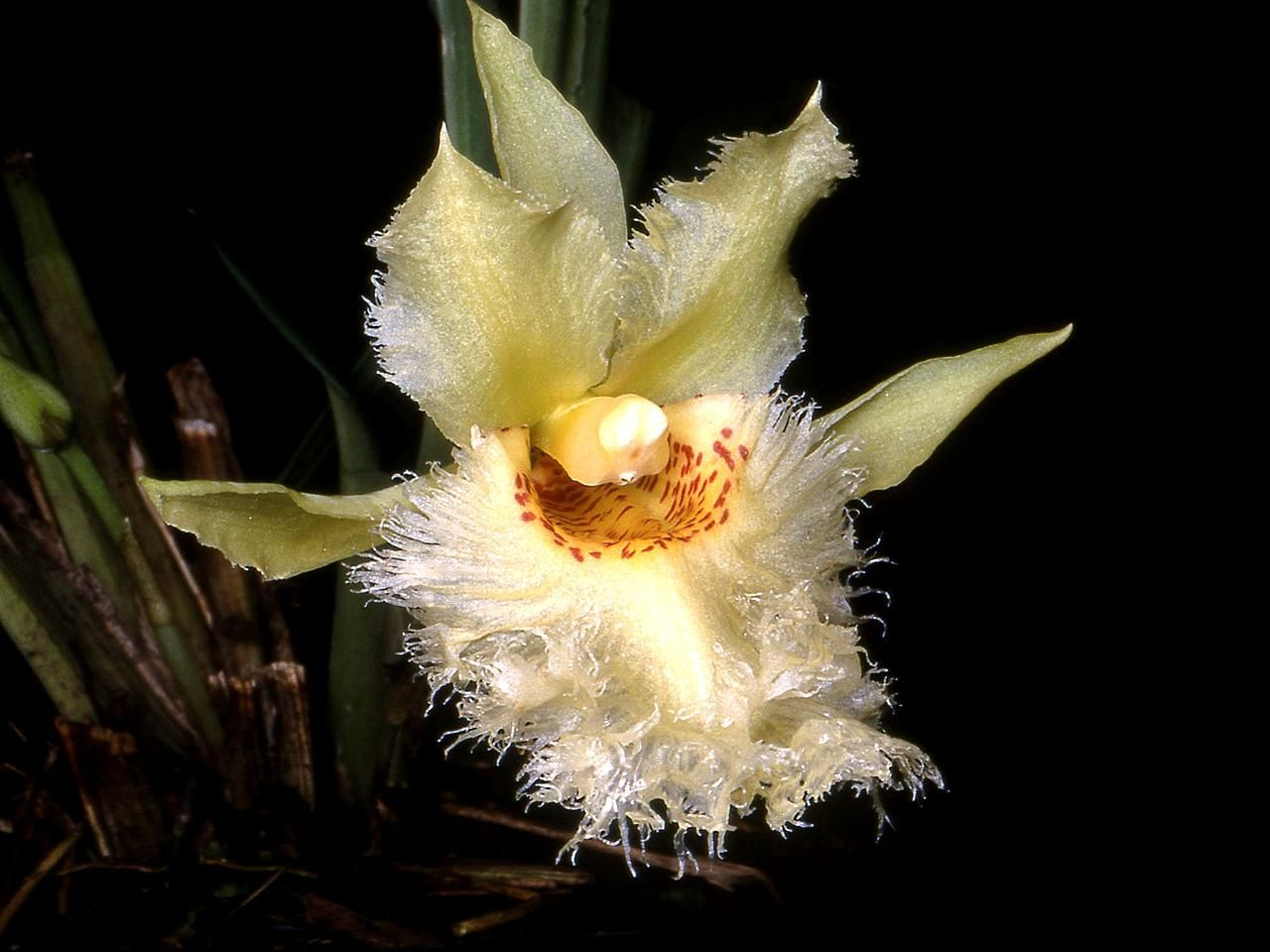
- Chondroscaphe chestertonii

Scientific classification
- Kingdom: Plantae
- Clade: Tracheophytes
- Clade: Angiosperms
- Clade: Monocots
- Order: Asparagales
- Family: Orchidaceae
- Subfamily: Epidendroideae
- Tribe: Cymbidieae
- Subtribe: Zygopetalinae
- Genus: Chondroscaphe (Dressler) Senghas & G.Gerlach in F.R.R.Schlechter

= Chondroscaphe =

Genus of orchids

Chondroscaphe is a genus of orchids native to southeastern Central America and northwestern South America.

1. Chondroscaphe amabilis (Schltr.) Senghas & G.Gerlach in F.R.R.Schlechter - Ecuador, Colombia
2. Chondroscaphe atrilinguis Dressler - Costa Rica, Panama
3. Chondroscaphe bicolor (Rolfe) Dressler - Costa Rica, Panama
4. Chondroscaphe chestertonii (Rchb.f.) Senghas & G.Gerlach in F.R.R.Schlechter - Ecuador, Colombia
5. Chondroscaphe dabeibaensis P.A.Harding - Colombia
6. Chondroscaphe eburnea (Dressler) Dressler - Panama
7. Chondroscaphe embreei (Dodson & Neudecker) Rungius - Ecuador, Colombia
8. Chondroscaphe escobariana (Dodson & Neudecker) Rungius - Colombia
9. Chondroscaphe flaveola (Linden & Rchb.f.) Senghas & G.Gerlach in F.R.R.Schlechter - Colombia, Venezuela, Peru
10. Chondroscaphe gentryi (Dodson & Neudecker) Rungius - Ecuador
11. Chondroscaphe merana (Dodson & Neudecker) Dressler - Ecuador
12. Chondroscaphe plicata (D.E.Benn. & Christenson) Dressler - Peru
13. Chondroscaphe venezuelana Pupulin & Dressler - Venezuela
14. Chondroscaphe yamilethae Pupulin - Costa Rica

== See also ==
- List of Orchidaceae genera
