= Warreopsis =

Scientific classification
- Kingdom: Plantae
- Clade: Tracheophytes
- Clade: Angiosperms
- Clade: Monocots
- Order: Asparagales
- Family: Orchidaceae
- Subfamily: Epidendroideae
- Tribe: Cymbidieae
- Subtribe: Zygopetalinae
- Genus: Warreopsis; Garay

Genus of orchids

Warreopsis is a genus of flowering plants from the orchid family, Orchidaceae. It contains 4 known species, native to southeastern Central America and to northwestern South America.

Species accepted as of June 2014:

- Warreopsis colorata (Linden & Rchb.f.) Garay - Venezuela, Colombia, Ecuador
- Warreopsis pardina (Rchb.f.) Garay - Colombia, Ecuador
- Warreopsis parviflora (L.O.Williams) Garay - Costa Rica, Panama
- Warreopsis purpurea P.Ortiz - Colombia

== See also ==
- List of Orchidaceae genera
