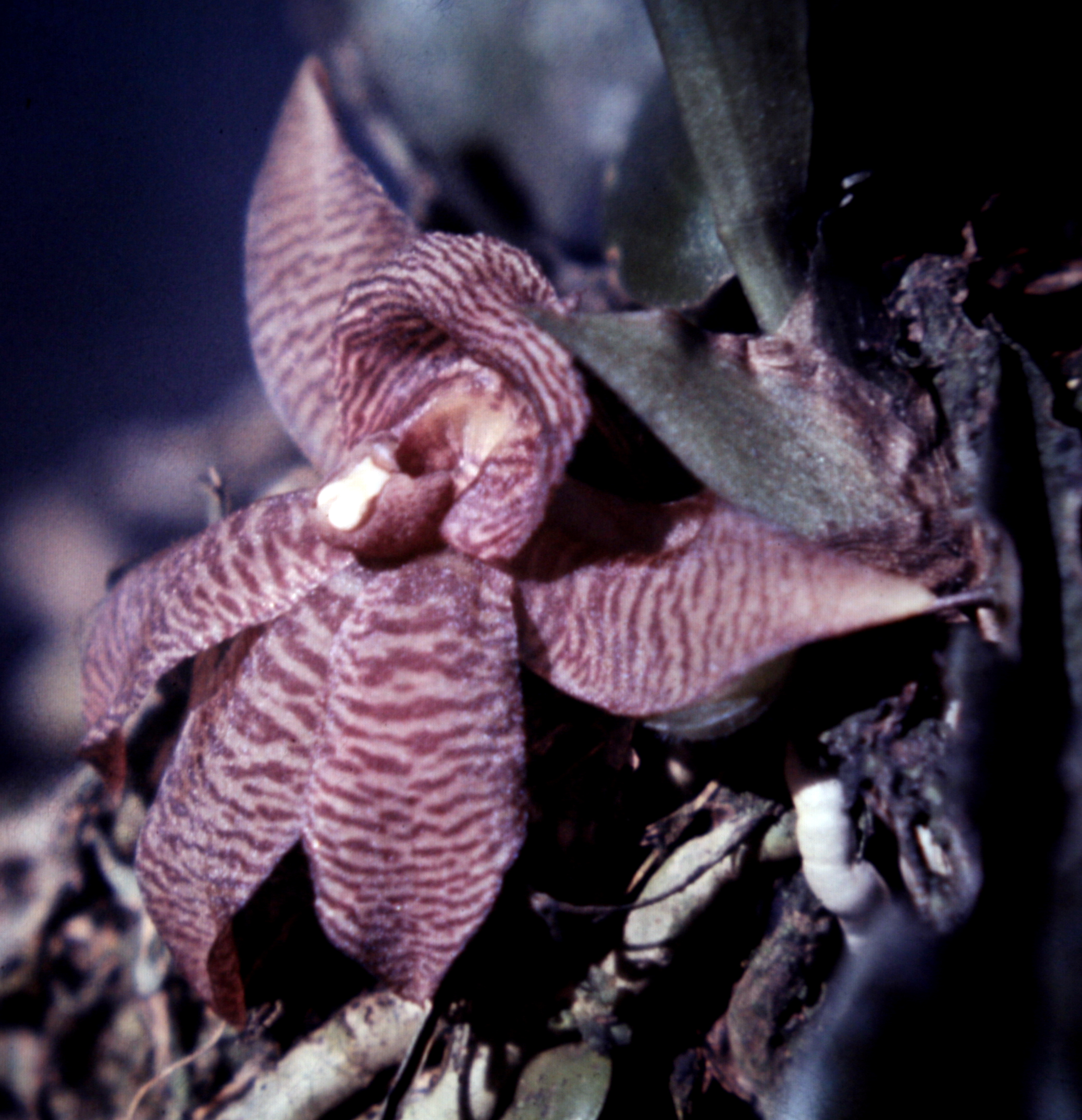
- Chaubardiella tigrina

Scientific classification
- Kingdom: Plantae
- Clade: Tracheophytes
- Clade: Angiosperms
- Clade: Monocots
- Order: Asparagales
- Family: Orchidaceae
- Subfamily: Epidendroideae
- Tribe: Cymbidieae
- Subtribe: Zygopetalinae
- Genus: Chaubardiella (Garay, 1969)

Type species
- Chaubardiella tigrina (Garay & Dunst.) Garay

= Chaubardiella =

Genus of orchids

Chaubardiella is a genus of flowering plants from the Cymbidieae of the orchid family, Orchidaceae, native to Costa Rica and South America.

1. Chaubardiella dalessandroi Dodson & Dalström - Ecuador
2. Chaubardiella delcastilloi D.E.Benn. & Christenson - Peru
3. Chaubardiella hirtzii Dodson - Ecuador, Peru
4. Chaubardiella pacuarensis Jenny - Costa Rica
5. Chaubardiella pubescens Ackerman - Colombia
6. Chaubardiella serrulata D.E.Benn. & Christenson - Peru
7. Chaubardiella subquadrata (Schltr.) Garay - Costa Rica, Colombia, Ecuador
8. Chaubardiella tigrina (Garay & Dunst.) Garay - Colombia, Ecuador, Peru, Venezuela, Suriname, Guyana, French Guinea

== See also ==
- List of Orchidaceae genera
