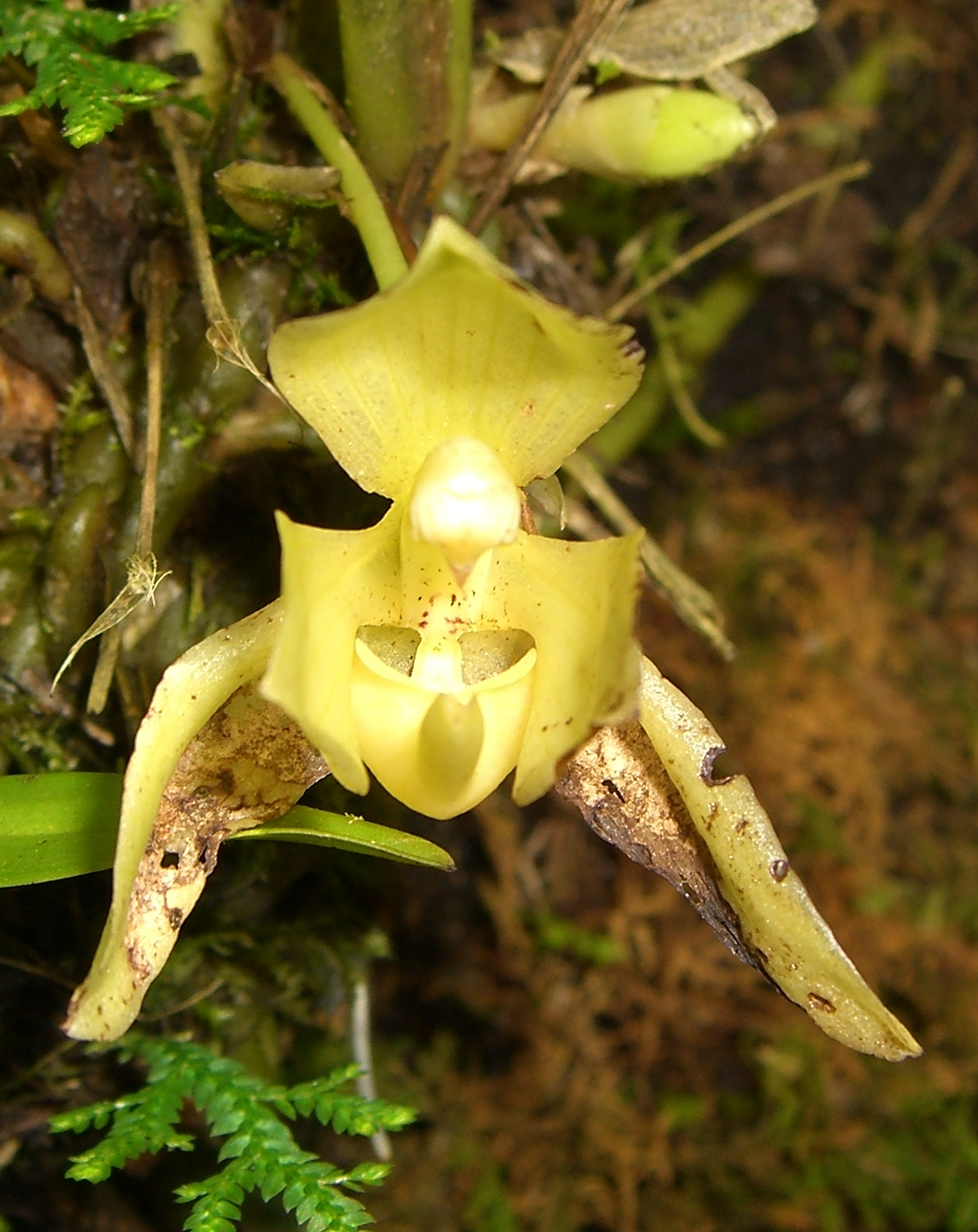
- Stenia angustilabia

Scientific classification
- Kingdom: Plantae
- Clade: Tracheophytes
- Clade: Angiosperms
- Clade: Monocots
- Order: Asparagales
- Family: Orchidaceae
- Subfamily: Epidendroideae
- Tribe: Cymbidieae
- Subtribe: Zygopetalinae
- Genus: Stenia; Lindl..

Type species
- Stenia pallida Lindl..

Synonyms
- Dodsonia Ackerman; Stenopolen Raf.

= Stenia =

Genus of orchids

The grass moth genus Stenia is probably a junior synonym of Dolicharthria; see there.

Stenia is a genus in the orchid family (Orchidaceae). It was established by John Lindley in 1837. These epiphytic plants occur in warm, humid habitats of Trinidad and the Amazonian slope of the northern Andean region in South America.

This genus as a rule lacks pseudobulbs and consequently produces tufted fan-like growths of fairly erect narrow, short leaves, and conforms to the sympodial method of growth.

Stenia plants produce a short, creeping or erect, single-flowered inflorescences, growing laterally. The flowers are medium-sized, with equal petals and sepals. All members of this genus have their flowers dominated by the large, shoe-like, concave labellum (lip) with a disc-like, toothed crest. The flowers have four elongate pollinia, with the upper pollinia long and narrow. They occur at any time of the year, though slightly more concentrated during summer in cultivation.

== Species ==
Though this genus has been known to science since the early 19th century, most species were not discovered until the late 20th century.

1. Stenia angustilabia D.E.Benn. & Christenson (Peru)
2. Stenia aurorae D.E.Benn. & Christenson (Peru)
3. Stenia bismarckii Dodson & D.E.Benn. ( S. Ecuador to Peru)
4. Stenia calceolaris (Garay) Dodson & D.E.Benn. (Ecuador to N. Peru)
5. Stenia christensonii D.E.Benn. (Peru)
6. Stenia falcata (Ackerman) Dressler
7. Stenia glatzii Neudecker & G.Gerlach (Ecuador)
8. Stenia guttata Rchb.f. (Peru)
9. Stenia jarae D.E.Benn. (Peru)
10. Stenia lillianae Jenny ex D.E.Benn. & Christenson (Peru)
11. Stenia luerorum D.E.Benn. & Christenson (Peru)
12. Stenia nataliana R.Vásquez & Nowicki & R.Müll. (Bolivia)
13. Stenia pallida Lindl. (Trinidad, Guyana, Venezuela, Ecuador, Peru)
14. Stenia pastorellii D.E.Benn. (Peru)
15. Stenia pustulosa D.E.Benn. & Christenson (Peru)
16. Stenia saccata Garay (Ecuador)
17. Stenia stenioides (Garay) Dodson & R.Escobar (Ecuador)
18. Stenia uribei P.Ortiz (Colombia)
19. Stenia vasquezii Dodson (Bolivia)
20. Stenia wendiae D.E.Benn. & Christenson (Peru)
