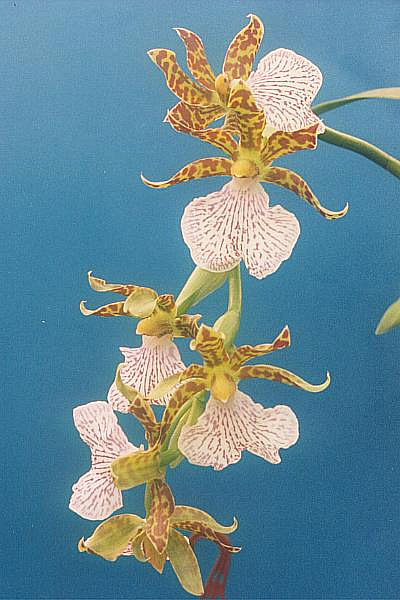
- Zygopetalum maculatum

Scientific classification
- Kingdom: Plantae
- Clade: Tracheophytes
- Clade: Angiosperms
- Clade: Monocots
- Order: Asparagales
- Family: Orchidaceae
- Subfamily: Epidendroideae
- Tribe: Cymbidieae
- Subtribe: Zygopetalinae; Schltr.

Type genus
- Zygopetalum

Genera
- See text

= Zygopetalinae =

Subtribe of orchids

Zygopetalinae is an orchid subtribe in the tribe Cymbidieae with 418 species.

== Description ==
Orchids in Zygopetalinae are mostly epiphytic but can be terrestrial, with pseudobulbs of one or several internodes or slender stems. All genera but one are sympodial. Leaves are convolute or duplicate, plicate, and articulate, with a smooth cuticle. Inflorescences of one to several spiral flowers rise from young shoots laterally. Flowers vary in size and can be resupinate. Columns can be winged or flattened and usually have a distinct foot. The anther can be either terminal or ventral, with an operculum. Velamen resembles that of the genus Cymbidium.

Plants have 46, 48, or 52 chromosomes.

== Genera ==
Genera include:

- Aetheorhyncha
- Aganisia
- Batemannia
- Benzingia
- Chaubardia
- Chaubardiella
- Cheiradenia
- Chondrorhyncha
- Chondroscaphe
- Cochleanthes
- Cryptarrhena
- Daiotyla
- Dichaea
- Echinorhyncha
- Euryblema
- Galeottia
- Hoehneella
- Huntleya
- Ixyophora
- Kefersteinia
- Koellensteinia
- Neogardneria
- Otostylis
- Pabstia
- Paradisanthus
- Pescatoria
- Promenaea
- Stenia
- Stenotyla
- Vargasiella
- Warczewiczella
- Warrea
- Warreella
- Warreopsis
- Zygopetalum
- Zygosepalum

== Distribution and habitat ==
Species of the subtribe occur throughout the American tropics, from southern Mexico in North America to northern Argentina and Bolivia in South America. The northernmost species are of the genera Kefersteinia and Stenotyla in North America, and the southernmost in South America are in the genera Warrea and Zygopetalum. The greatest diversity in genera and species occurs along the Andes mountains.

Plants of Zygopetalinae grow from sea level to 2,500 m (8,200 ft) in altitude. Most plants are adapted to shaded and wet conditions of the lower canopy, in soil or on often moss covered host trees.

== Ecology ==
Members of Zygopetalinae are pollinated by Euglossine bees, most often by perfume-gathering males. Some species of Cochleanthes are an exception, attracting nectar-seeking bees. Most genera place their pollinaria on the bee's head, thorax, or scutellum, though Chaubardiella places its pollinaria on the bee's trochanters and Kefersteinia places its pollinaria on the bee's antennae bases.

== See also ==
- Taxonomy of the Orchidaceae
