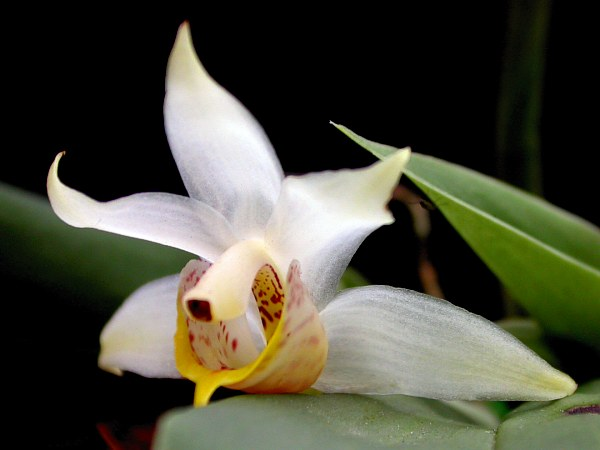
- Benzingia caudata

Scientific classification
- Kingdom: Plantae
- Clade: Tracheophytes
- Clade: Angiosperms
- Clade: Monocots
- Order: Asparagales
- Family: Orchidaceae
- Subfamily: Epidendroideae
- Tribe: Cymbidieae
- Subtribe: Zygopetalinae
- Genus: Benzingia; Dodson

Type species
- Benzingia hirtzii Dodson

Synonyms
- Ackermania Dodson & R.Escobar, illegitimate

= Benzingia =

Genus of orchids

Benzingia is a genus of flowering plants from the orchid family, Orchidaceae. It is native to mountains of Central America and northwestern South America from Costa Rica to Peru.

== Species ==
As of May 2012 nine species are recognized:

1. Benzingia caudata (Ackerman) Dressler – Peru (Cordillera del Cóndor), Ecuador
2. Benzingia cornuta (Garay) Dressler - Colombia, Ecuador
3. Benzingia estradae (Dodson) Dodson - Ecuador
4. Benzingia hajekii (D.E.Benn. & Christenson) Dressler – Peru
5. Benzingia hirtzii Dodson - Ecuador (Esmeraldas)
6. Benzingia jarae (D.E.Benn. & Christenson) Dressler – Peru
7. Benzingia palorae (Dodson & Hirtz) Dressler - Colombia, Ecuador
8. Benzingia reichenbachiana (Schltr.) Dressler - Costa Rica, Panama
9. Benzingia thienii (Dodson) P.A.Harding - Ecuador

== See also ==
- List of Orchidaceae genera
