= Aetheorhyncha =

Scientific classification
- Kingdom: Plantae
- Clade: Tracheophytes
- Clade: Angiosperms
- Clade: Monocots
- Order: Asparagales
- Family: Orchidaceae
- Subfamily: Epidendroideae
- Tribe: Cymbidieae
- Subtribe: Zygopetalinae
- Genus: Aetheorhyncha; Dressler
- Species: A. andreettae

Binomial name
- Aetheorhyncha andreettae (Jenny) Dressler

Synonyms
- Chondrorhyncha andreettae Jenny

Genus of orchids

Aetheorhyncha is a genus of epiphytic orchids. It contains only one known species, Aetheorhyncha andreettae, endemic to Ecuador.
