= Vargasiella =

Scientific classification
- Kingdom: Plantae
- Clade: Tracheophytes
- Clade: Angiosperms
- Clade: Monocots
- Order: Asparagales
- Family: Orchidaceae
- Subfamily: Epidendroideae
- Tribe: Cymbidieae
- Subtribe: Zygopetalinae
- Genus: Vargasiella; C.Schweinf.

Genus of orchids

Vargasiella is a genus of flowering plants from the orchid family, Orchidaceae. It contains two species, both endemic to South America: It has been treated as the only genus in the subtribe Vargasiellinae, but more recently has been included in the subtribe Zygopetalinae.

- Vargasiella peruviana C.Schweinf. - Peru
- Vargasiella venezuelana C.Schweinf. - Venezuela

== See also ==
- List of Orchidaceae genera
