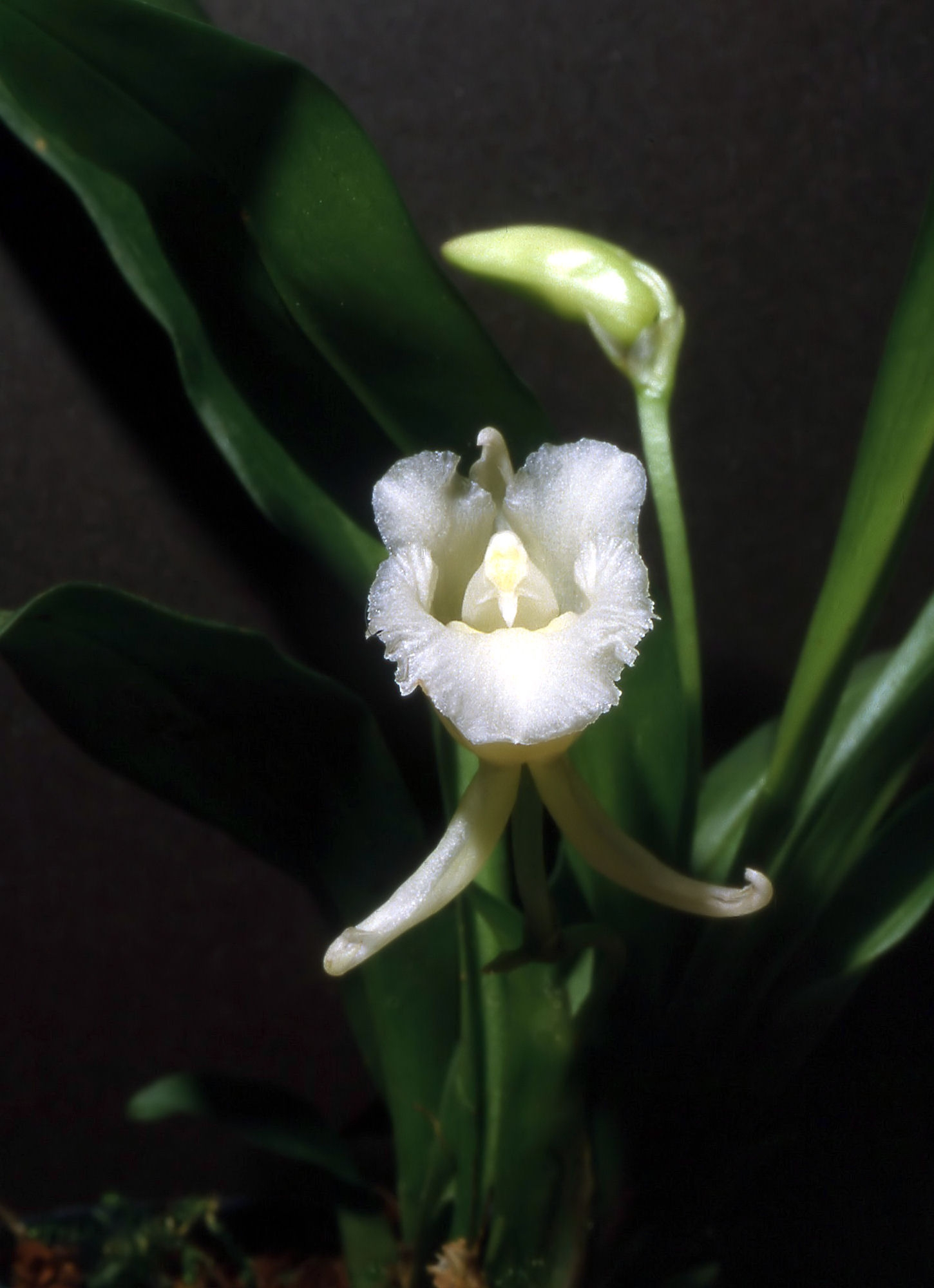
- Daiotyla albicans

Scientific classification
- Kingdom: Plantae
- Clade: Tracheophytes
- Clade: Angiosperms
- Clade: Monocots
- Order: Asparagales
- Family: Orchidaceae
- Subfamily: Epidendroideae
- Tribe: Cymbidieae
- Subtribe: Zygopetalinae
- Genus: Daiotyla; Dressler

Type species
- Daiotyla albicans Rolfe

= Daiotyla =

Genus of orchids

Daiotyla is a genus of orchids native to Colombia, Panama and Costa Rica.

1. Daiotyla albicans (Rolfe) Dressler - Panama, Costa Rica
2. Daiotyla crassa (Dressler) Dressler - Panama
3. Daiotyla maculata (Garay) Dressler - Colombia
4. Daiotyla xanthina Pupulin & Dressler - Colombia

== See also ==
- List of Orchidaceae genera
