= Echinorhyncha =

Scientific classification
- Kingdom: Plantae
- Clade: Tracheophytes
- Clade: Angiosperms
- Clade: Monocots
- Order: Asparagales
- Family: Orchidaceae
- Subfamily: Epidendroideae
- Tribe: Cymbidieae
- Subtribe: Zygopetalinae
- Genus: Echinorhyncha; Dressler

Type species
- Chondrorhyncha litensis Dodson

Genus of orchids

Echinorhyncha is a genus of orchids. It contains 5 known species, all native to Colombia and Ecuador.

- Echinorhyncha antonii (P.Ortiz) Dressler - Colombia
- Echinorhyncha ecuadorensis (Dodson) Dressler - Ecuador
- Echinorhyncha litensis (Dodson) Dressler - Colombia, Ecuador
- Echinorhyncha manzurii (P.Ortiz) P.A.Harding & Manzur - Colombia
- Echinorhyncha vollesii (G.Gerlach, Neudecker & Seeger) Dressler - Colombia, Ecuador

== See also ==
- List of Orchidaceae genera
