= Euryblema =

Scientific classification
- Kingdom: Plantae
- Clade: Tracheophytes
- Clade: Angiosperms
- Clade: Monocots
- Order: Asparagales
- Family: Orchidaceae
- Subfamily: Epidendroideae
- Tribe: Cymbidieae
- Subtribe: Zygopetalinae
- Genus: Euryblema; Dressler

Genus of orchids

Euryblema is a genus of flowering plants from the orchid family, Orchidaceae. It contains two known species, native to Panama and Colombia.

- Euryblema anatonum (Dressler) Dressler - Panama
- Euryblema andreae (P.Ortiz) Dressler - Colombia

== See also ==
- List of Orchidaceae genera
