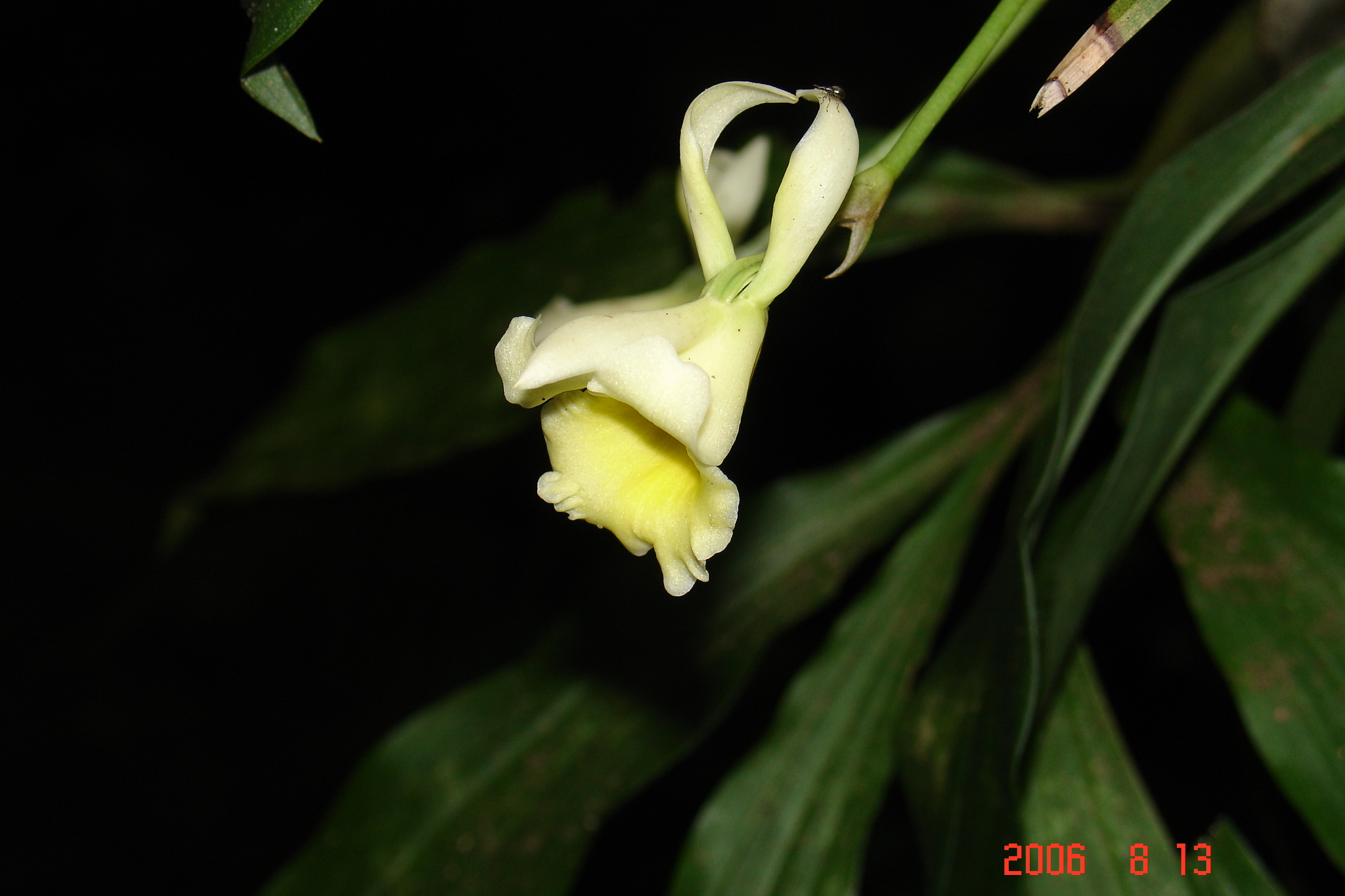
- Stenotyla lendyana

Scientific classification
- Kingdom: Plantae
- Clade: Tracheophytes
- Clade: Angiosperms
- Clade: Monocots
- Order: Asparagales
- Family: Orchidaceae
- Subfamily: Epidendroideae
- Tribe: Cymbidieae
- Subtribe: Zygopetalinae
- Genus: Stenotyla; Dressler

Type species
- Chondrorhyncha lendyana Rchb.f.

= Stenotyla =

Genus of orchids

Stenotyla is a genus of orchids. It contains 9 known species, all native to Central America and southern Mexico.

- Stenotyla estrellensis (Ames) P.A.Harding - Costa Rica
- Stenotyla francoi Archila - Guatemala
- Stenotyla helleri (Fowlie) P.A.Harding - Nicaragua
- Stenotyla lankesteriana (Pupulin) Dressler - Costa Rica, Panama
- Stenotyla lendyana (Rchb.f.) Dressler - Oaxaca, Chiapas, Guatemala, El Salvador, Honduras
- Stenotyla maculata Archila - Guatemala
- Stenotyla maxillaperta Archila - Guatemala
- Stenotyla panamensis Pupulin - Panama
- Stenotyla picta (Rchb.f.) Dressler - Costa Rica, Panama

== See also ==
- List of Orchidaceae genera
