= Ixyophora =

Scientific classification
- Kingdom: Plantae
- Clade: Tracheophytes
- Clade: Angiosperms
- Clade: Monocots
- Order: Asparagales
- Family: Orchidaceae
- Subfamily: Epidendroideae
- Tribe: Cymbidieae
- Subtribe: Zygopetalinae
- Genus: Ixyophora; Dressler

Genus of orchids

Ixyophora is a genus of flowering plants from the orchid family, Orchidaceae. It has 5 known species, all native to South America.

- Ixyophora aurantiaca (Senghas & G.Gerlach) Dressler - Peru
- Ixyophora carinata (P.Ortiz) Dressler - Colombia
- Ixyophora fosterae (Dodson) P.A.Harding - Bolivia
- Ixyophora luerorum (R.Vásquez & Dodson) P.A.Harding - Bolivia
- Ixyophora viridisepala (Senghas) Dressler - Ecuador

== See also ==
- List of Orchidaceae genera
