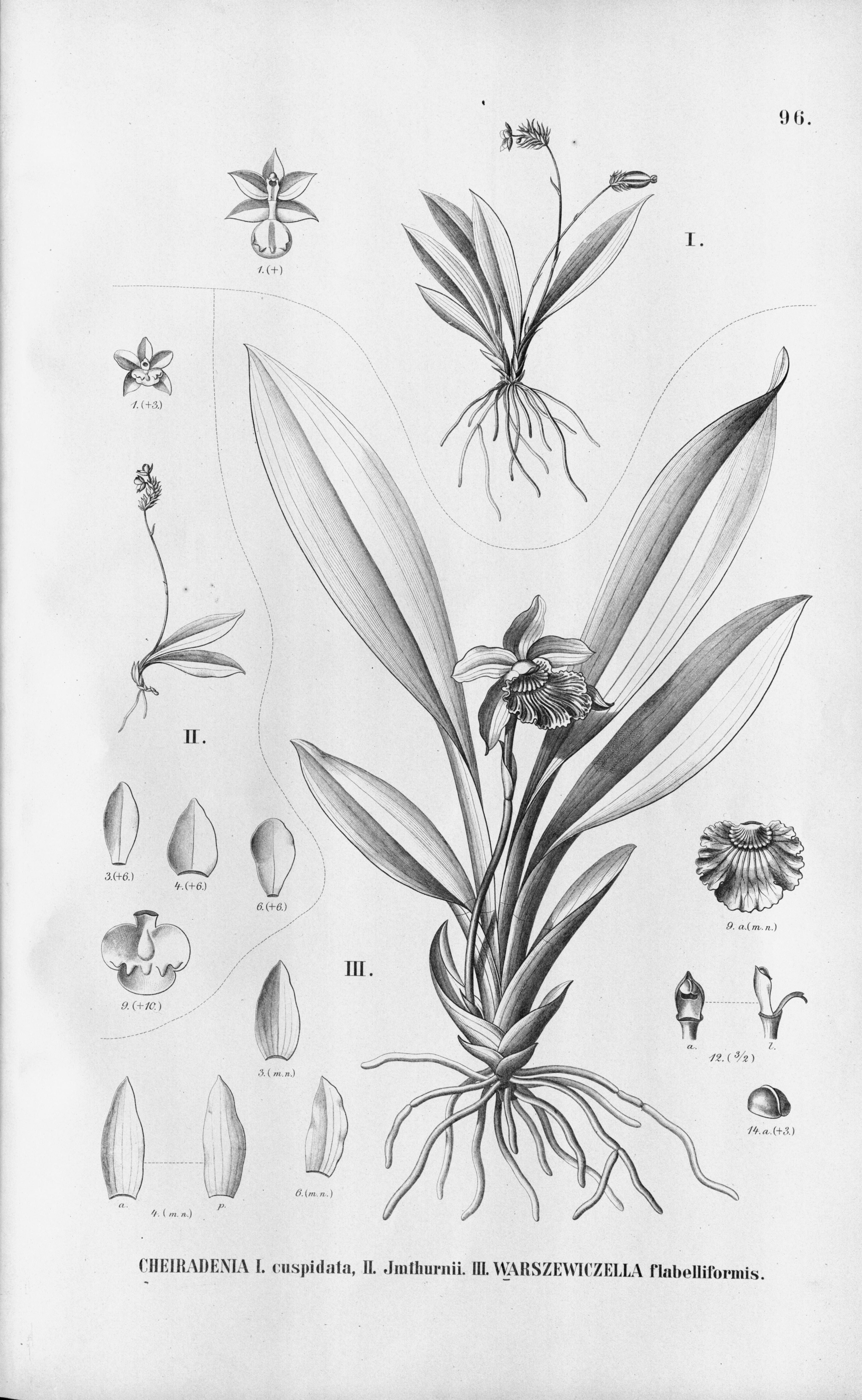

Scientific classification
- Kingdom: Plantae
- Clade: Tracheophytes
- Clade: Angiosperms
- Clade: Monocots
- Order: Asparagales
- Family: Orchidaceae
- Subfamily: Epidendroideae
- Tribe: Cymbidieae
- Subtribe: Zygopetalinae
- Genus: Cheiradenia; Lindl.
- Species: C. cuspidata

Binomial name
- Cheiradenia cuspidata Lindl.

Synonyms
- Cheiradenia imthurnii Cogn. in C.F.P.von Martius

= Cheiradenia =

Genus of orchids

Cheiradenia is a genus of flowering plants from the orchid family, Orchidaceae. It contains only one known species, Cheiradenia cuspidata, native to northern South America (Venezuela, Guyana, Suriname, French Guiana, northern Brazil).

== See also ==
- List of Orchidaceae genera
