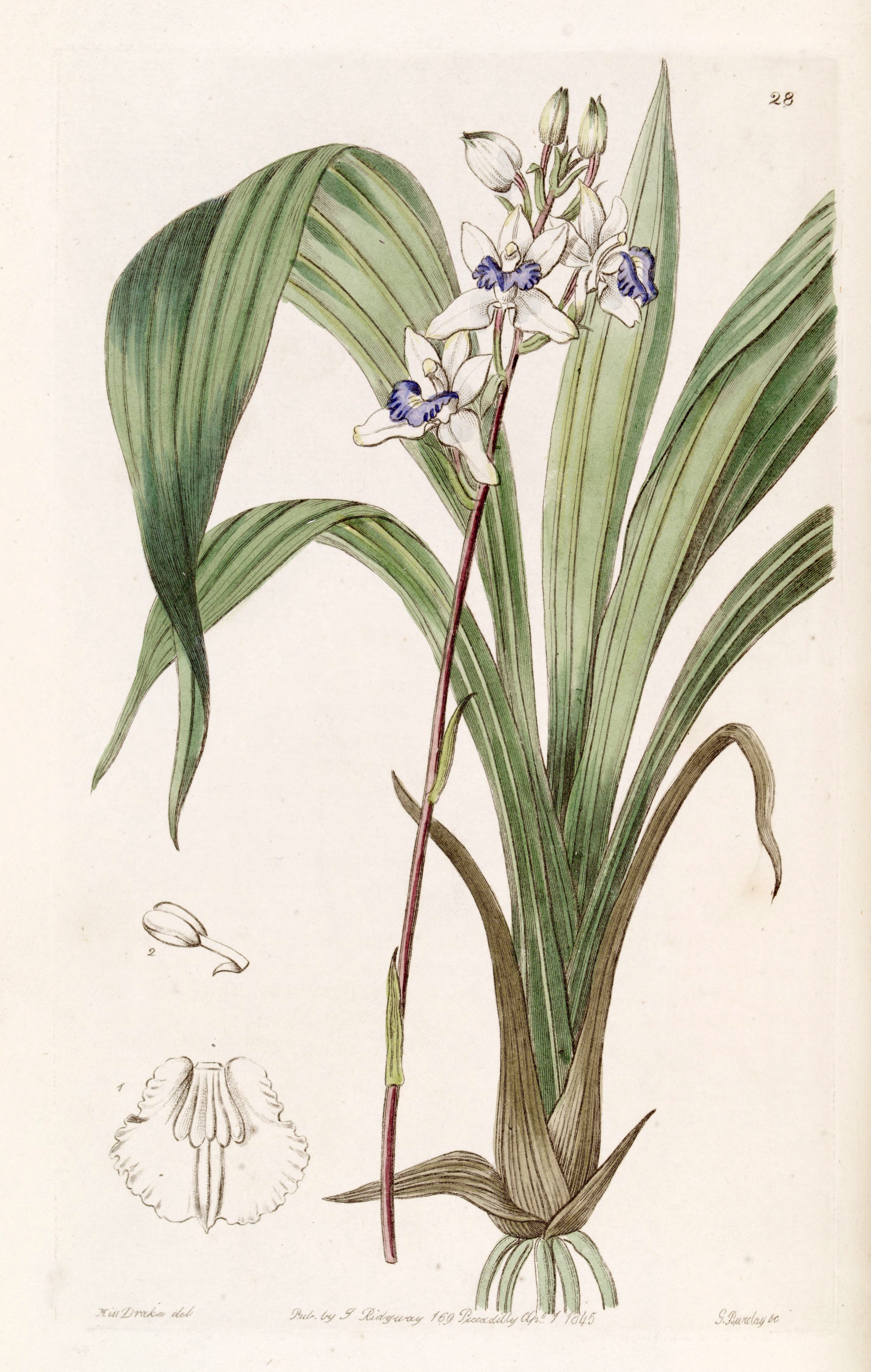
- Warreella cyanea

Scientific classification
- Kingdom: Plantae
- Clade: Tracheophytes
- Clade: Angiosperms
- Clade: Monocots
- Order: Asparagales
- Family: Orchidaceae
- Subfamily: Epidendroideae
- Tribe: Cymbidieae
- Subtribe: Zygopetalinae
- Genus: Warreella; Schltr.

= Warreella =

Genus of orchids

Warreella is a genus of flowering plants from the orchid family, Orchidaceae. It has two known species, both native to northwestern South America.

- Warreella cyanea (Lindl.) Schltr. - Colombia + Venezuela
- Warreella patula Garay - Colombia

== See also ==
- List of Orchidaceae genera
