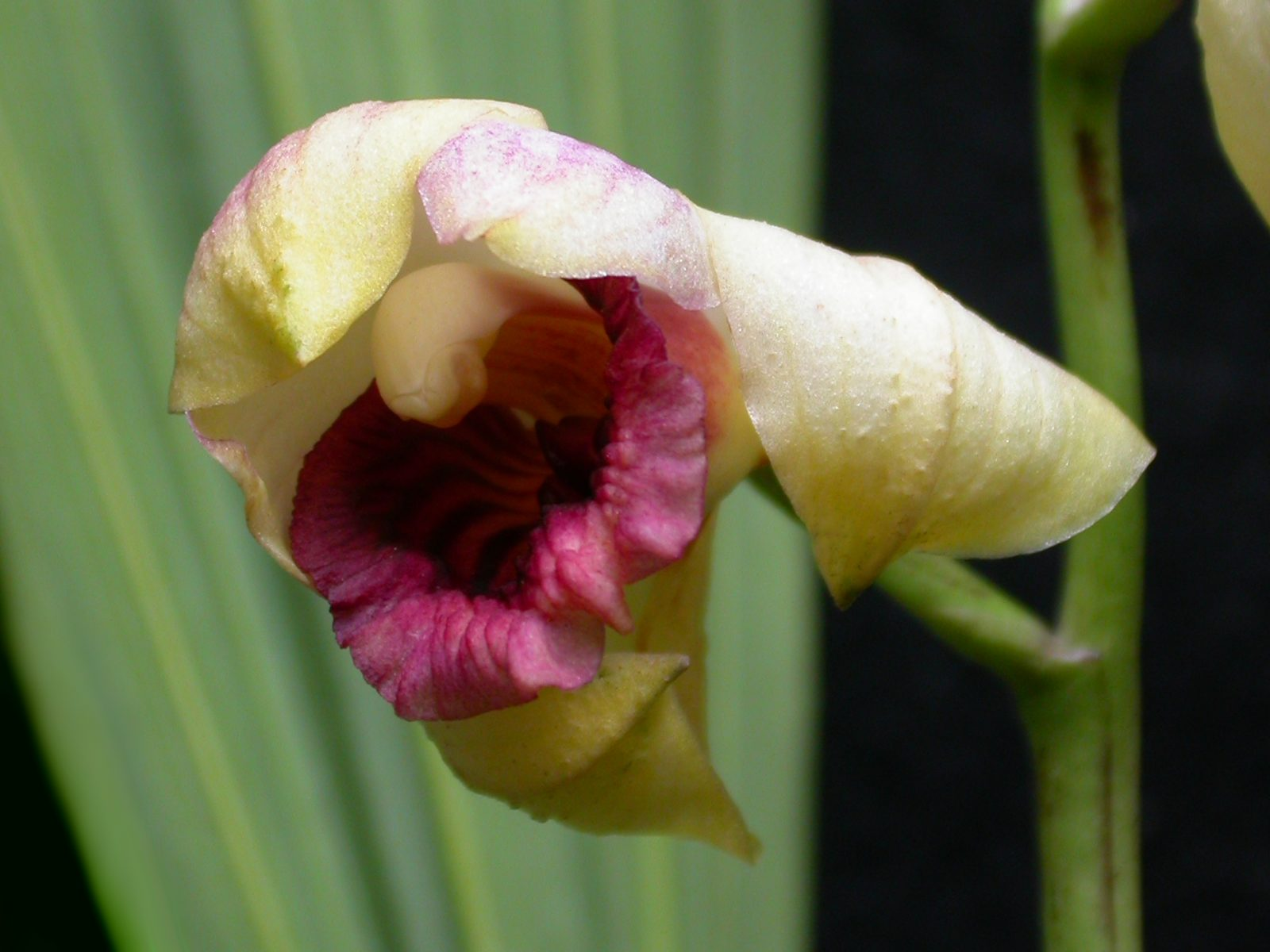
- Warrea warreana

Scientific classification
- Kingdom: Plantae
- Clade: Tracheophytes
- Clade: Angiosperms
- Clade: Monocots
- Order: Asparagales
- Family: Orchidaceae
- Subfamily: Epidendroideae
- Tribe: Cymbidieae
- Subtribe: Zygopetalinae
- Genus: Warrea; Lindl.

= Warrea =

Genus of orchids

Warrea is a genus of flowering plants from the orchid family, Orchidaceae. It has three known species, all native to Latin America.

- Warrea costaricensis Schltr. - Chiapas, Costa Rica, Guatemala, Honduras, Panama
- Warrea hookeriana (Rchb.f.) Rolfe - Peru
- Warrea warreana (Lodd. ex Lindl.) C.Schweinf. - from Colombia and Venezuela south to Argentina

== See also ==
- List of Orchidaceae genera
