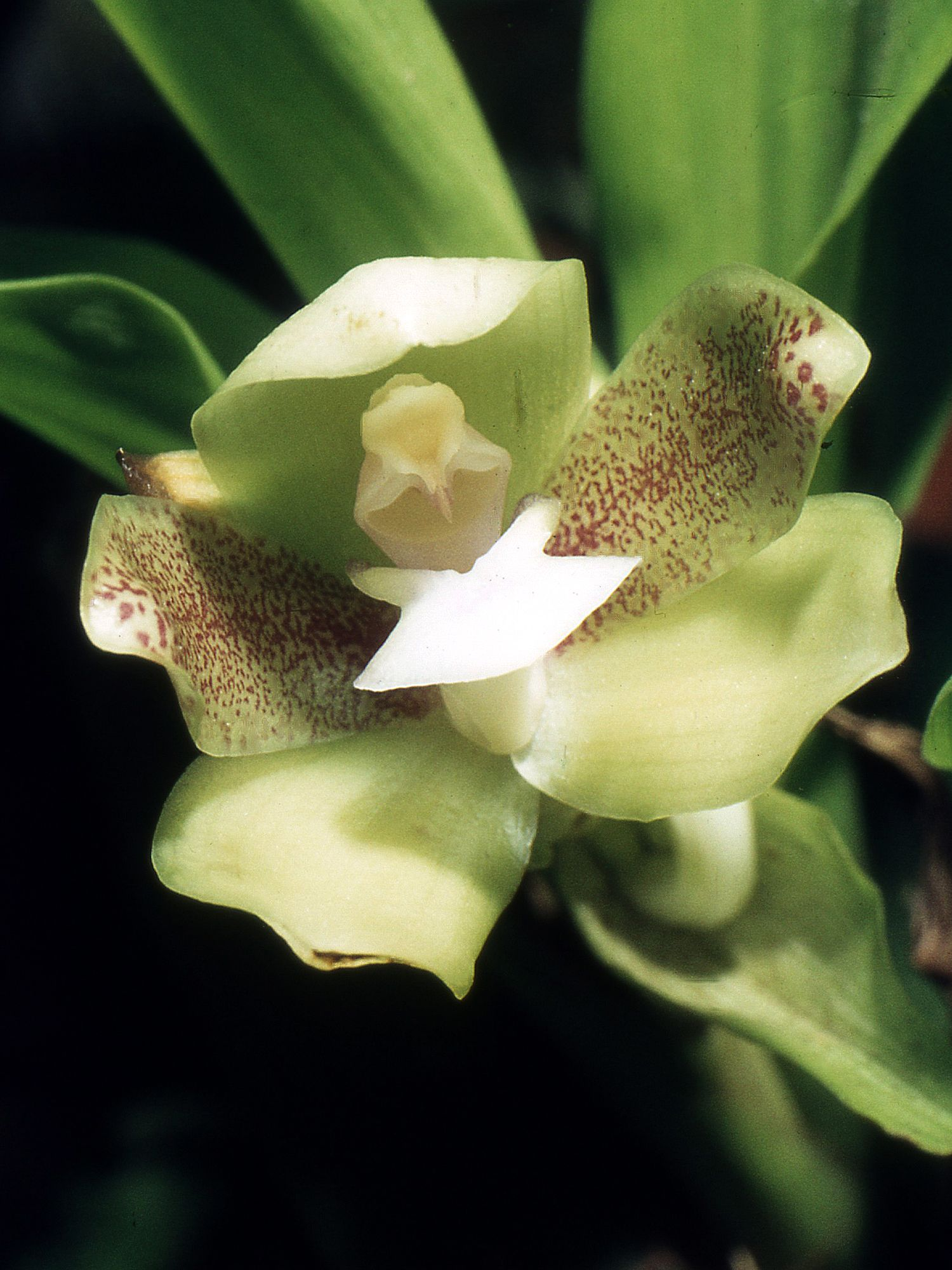
- Pabstia viridis

Scientific classification
- Kingdom: Plantae
- Clade: Tracheophytes
- Clade: Angiosperms
- Clade: Monocots
- Order: Asparagales
- Family: Orchidaceae
- Subfamily: Epidendroideae
- Tribe: Cymbidieae
- Subtribe: Zygopetalinae
- Genus: Pabstia; Garay

Synonyms
- Colax Lindl., illegitimate homonym

= Pabstia =

Genus of orchids

Pabstia is a genus of flowering plants from the orchid family, Orchidaceae.

== Species ==
As of November 2024, there are 5 known species, all endemic to Brazil.

Image	Scientific name	Distribution	Elevation (m)
	Pabstia jugosa (Lindl.) Garay	Brazil (Bahia, Espírito Santo, Rio de Janeiro, São Paulo, Paraná, Santa Catarina)	700 metres (2,300 ft)
	Pabstia modestior (Rchb.f.) Garay	Brazil (Espírito Santo, São Paulo, Santa Catarina, Paraná, Rio de Janeiro.)	200–1,500 metres (660–4,920 ft)
	Pabstia placanthera (Hook.) Garay	Brazil (Rio de Janeiro)	
	Pabstia schunkiana V.P.Castro	Brazil (Espírito Santo)	
	Pabstia viridis (Lindl.) Garay	Brazil (Espírito Santo, Rio de Janeiro, São Paulo)	200–1,500 metres (660–4,920 ft)

== See also ==
- List of Orchidaceae genera
