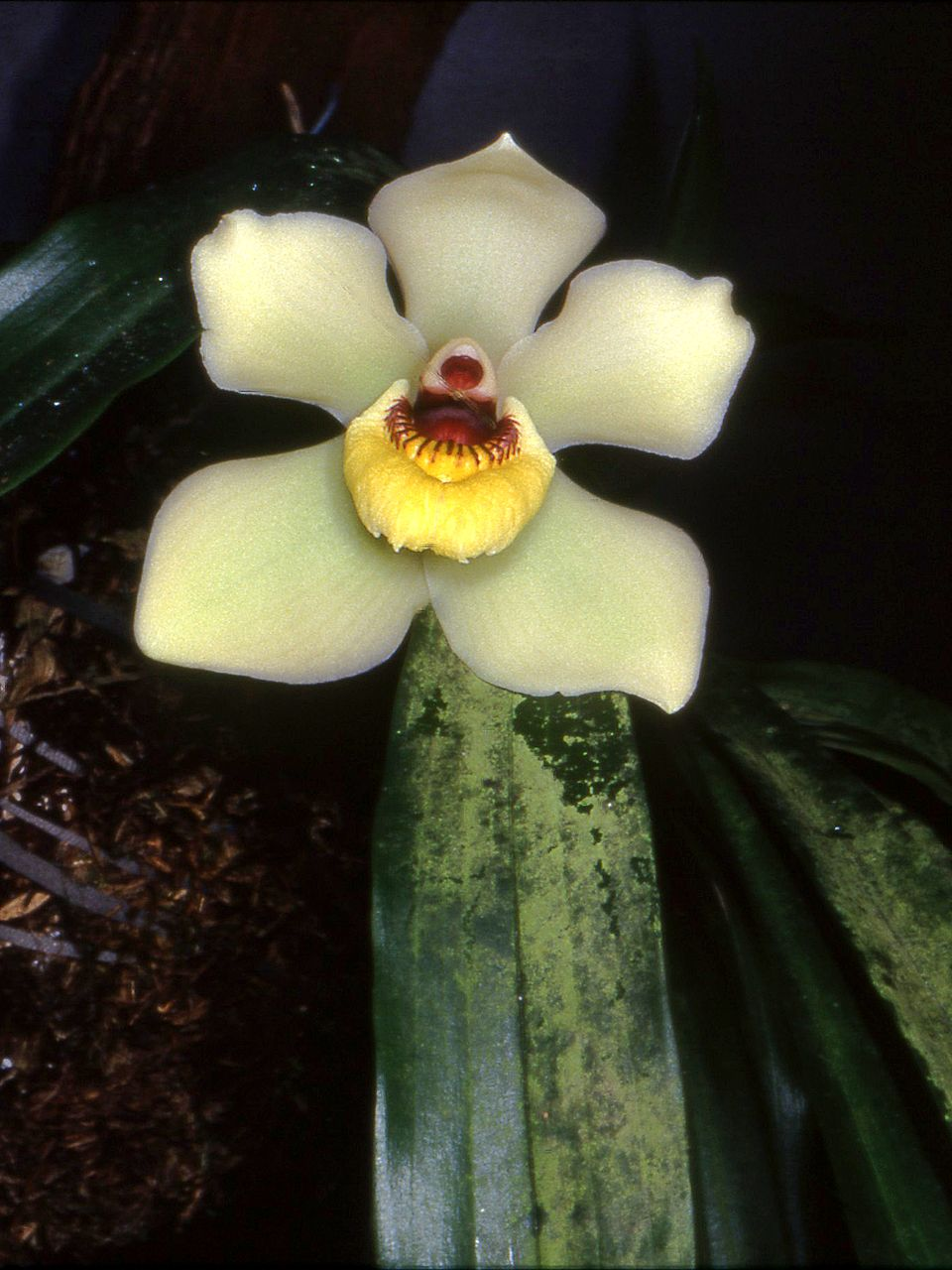
- Pescatoria cerina (typus)

Scientific classification
- Kingdom: Plantae
- Clade: Tracheophytes
- Clade: Angiosperms
- Clade: Monocots
- Order: Asparagales
- Family: Orchidaceae
- Subfamily: Epidendroideae
- Tribe: Cymbidieae
- Subtribe: Zygopetalinae
- Genus: Pescatoria; Rchb.f.

Type species
- Pescatoria cerina (Lindl. & Paxton) Rchb.f.

Synonyms
- Bollea Rchb.f.; Pescatorea Rchb.f.

= Pescatoria =

Genus of orchids

Pescatoria is a genus of flowering plants from the orchid family, Orchidaceae. It is native to Costa Rica, Panama, and northern South America.

== Species ==
As of December 2025, Plants of the World Online accepts the following 21 species and three hybrids:

- Pescatoria backhouseana Rchb.f.
- Pescatoria cerina (Lindl. & Paxton) Rchb.f.
- Pescatoria cochlearis Rolfe
- Pescatoria coelestis (Rchb.f.) Dressler
- Pescatoria coronaria (Rchb.f.) Rchb.f.
- Pescatoria dayana Rchb.f.
- Pescatoria ecuadorana (Dodson) Dressler
- Pescatoria hemixantha (Rchb.f.) Dressler
- Pescatoria hirtzii (Waldv.) Dressler
- Pescatoria klabochorum Rchb.f.
- Pescatoria lalindei (Rchb.f.) Dressler ex P.A.Harding
- Pescatoria lamellosa Rchb.f.
- Pescatoria lawrenceana (Rchb.f.) Dressler
- Pescatoria lehmannii Rchb.f.
- Pescatoria pulvinaris (Rchb.f.) Dressler
- Pescatoria russeliana Rchb.f.
- Pescatoria schroederiana (Sander) Rolfe
- Pescatoria triumphans Rchb.f. & Warsz.
- Pescatoria violacea (Lindl.) Dressler
- Pescatoria wallisii Linden & Rchb.f.
- Pescatoria whitei (Rolfe) Dressler

=== Hybrids ===
- Pescatoria × bella Rchb.f.
- Pescatoria × gairiana Rchb.f.
- Pescatoria × pallens (Rchb.f.) P.A.Harding

== Gallery ==
species and nothospecies
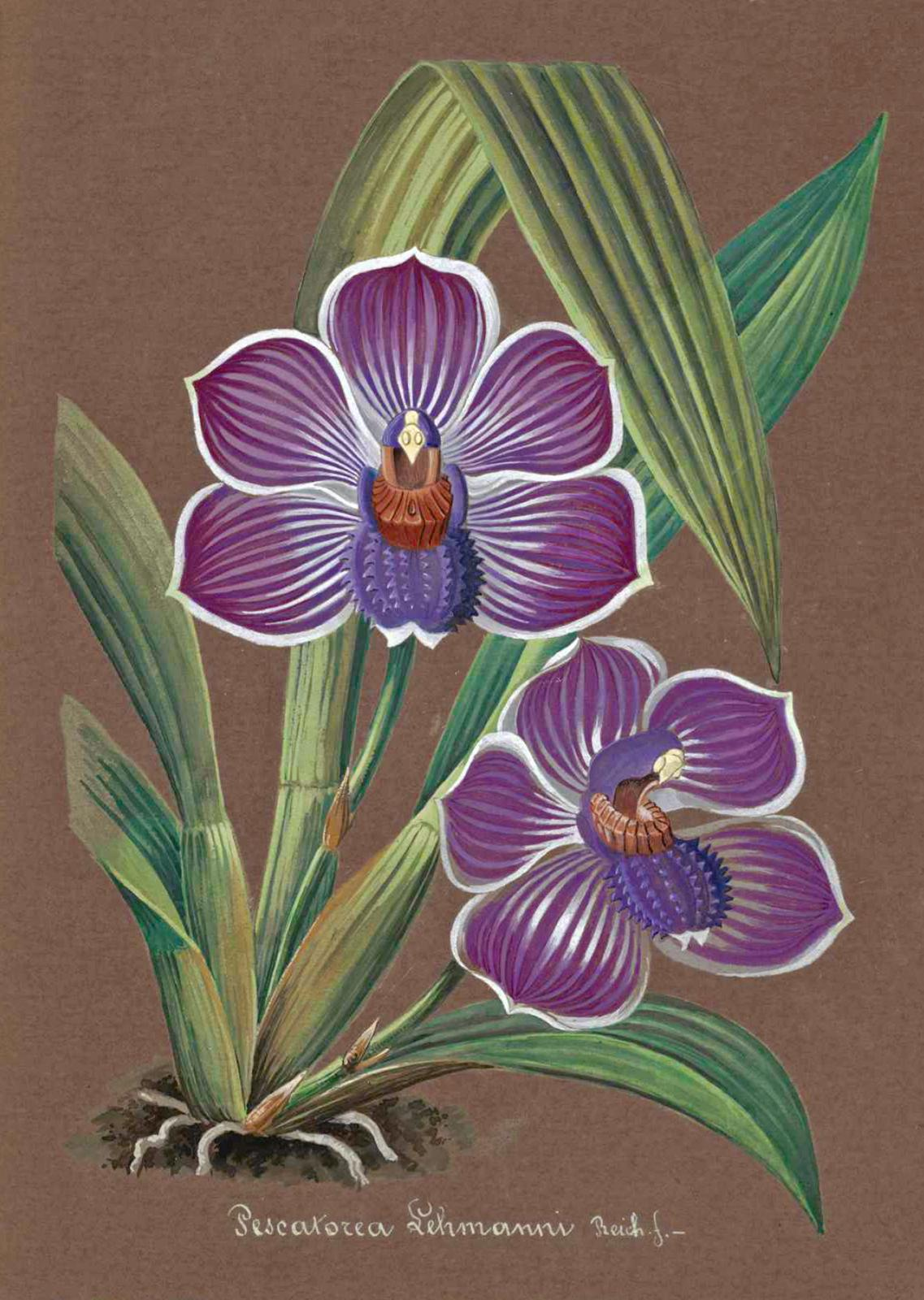
Pescatoria lehmannii (illustration)

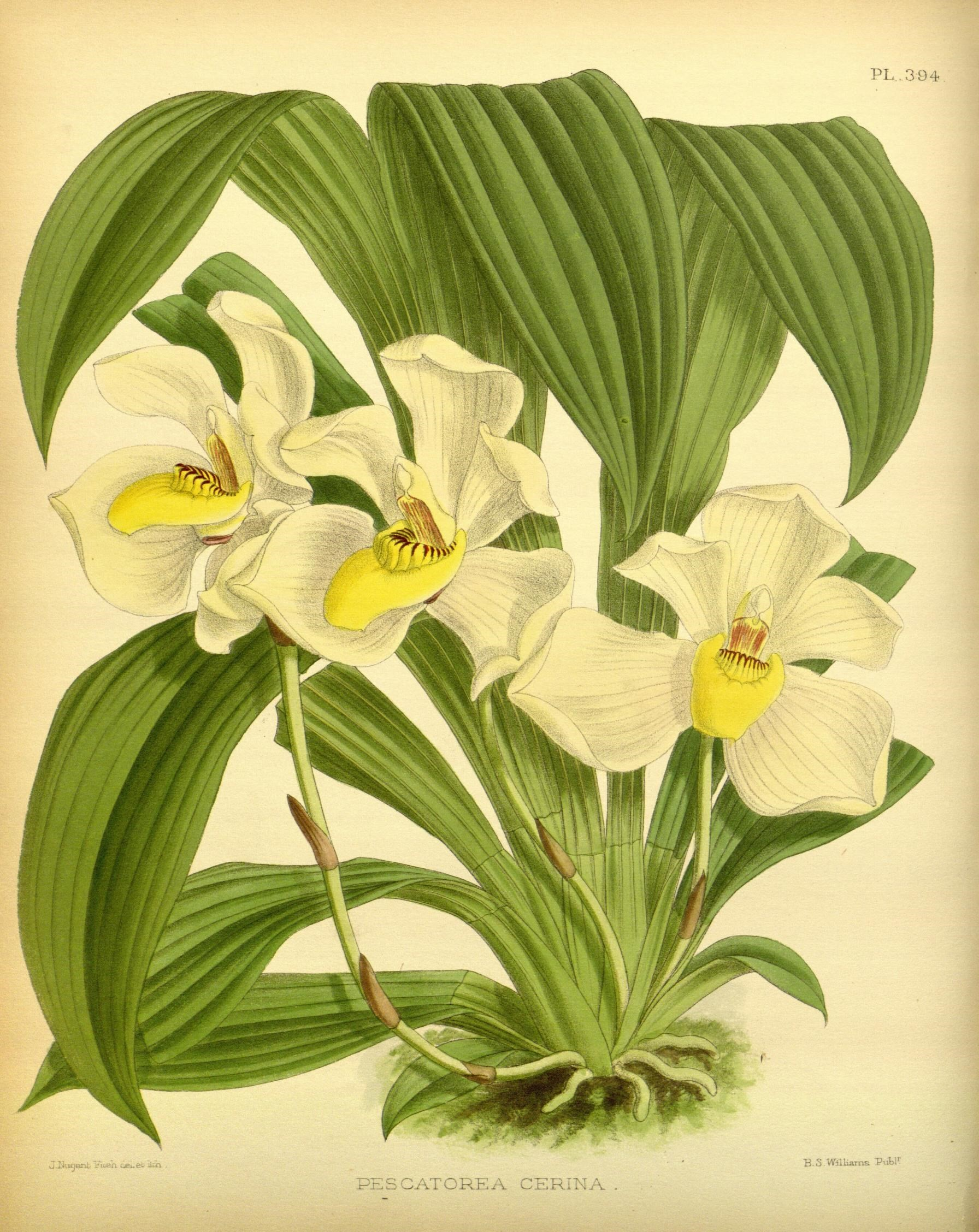
Pescatoria cerina (illustration)

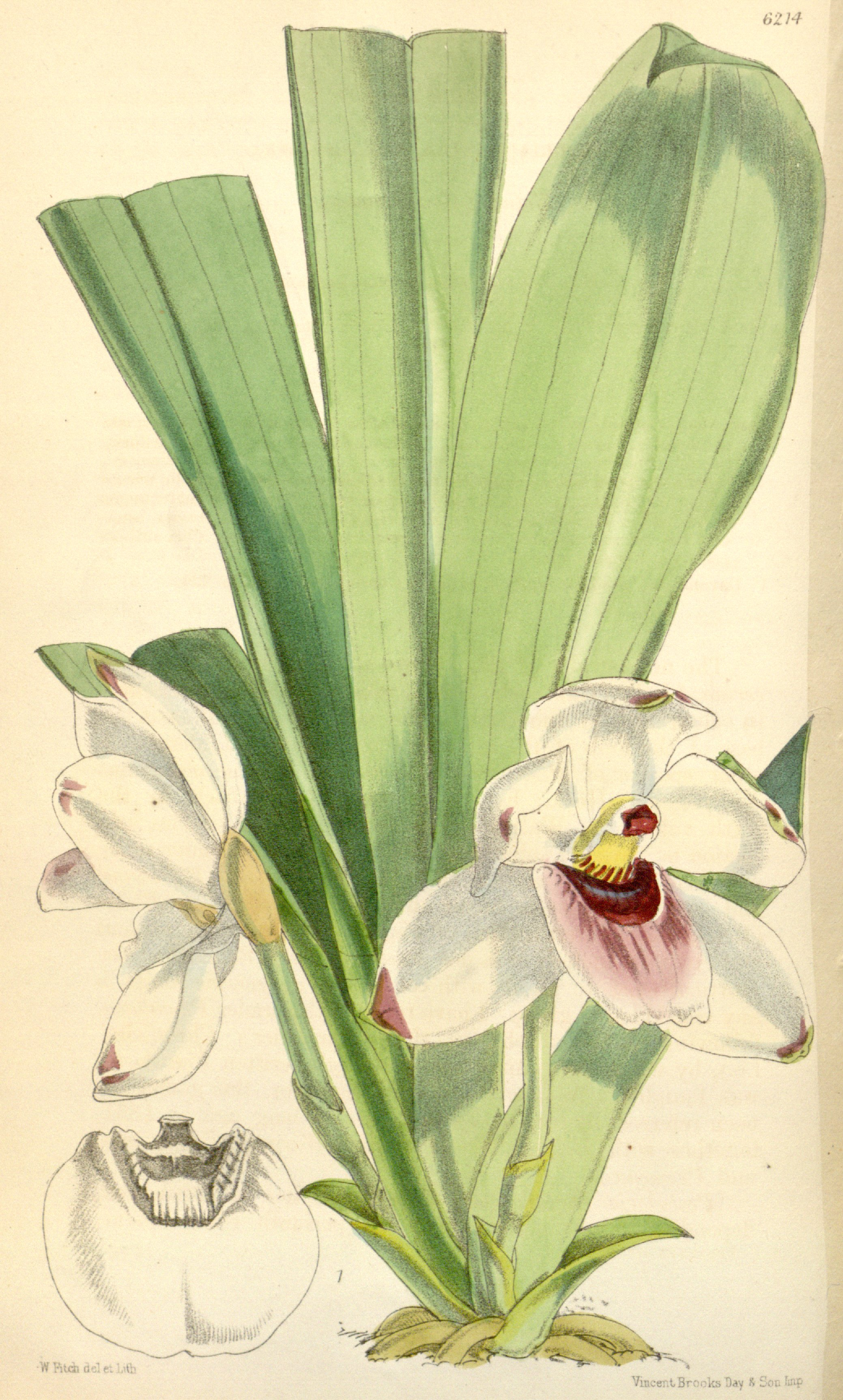
Pescatoria dayana (illustration)

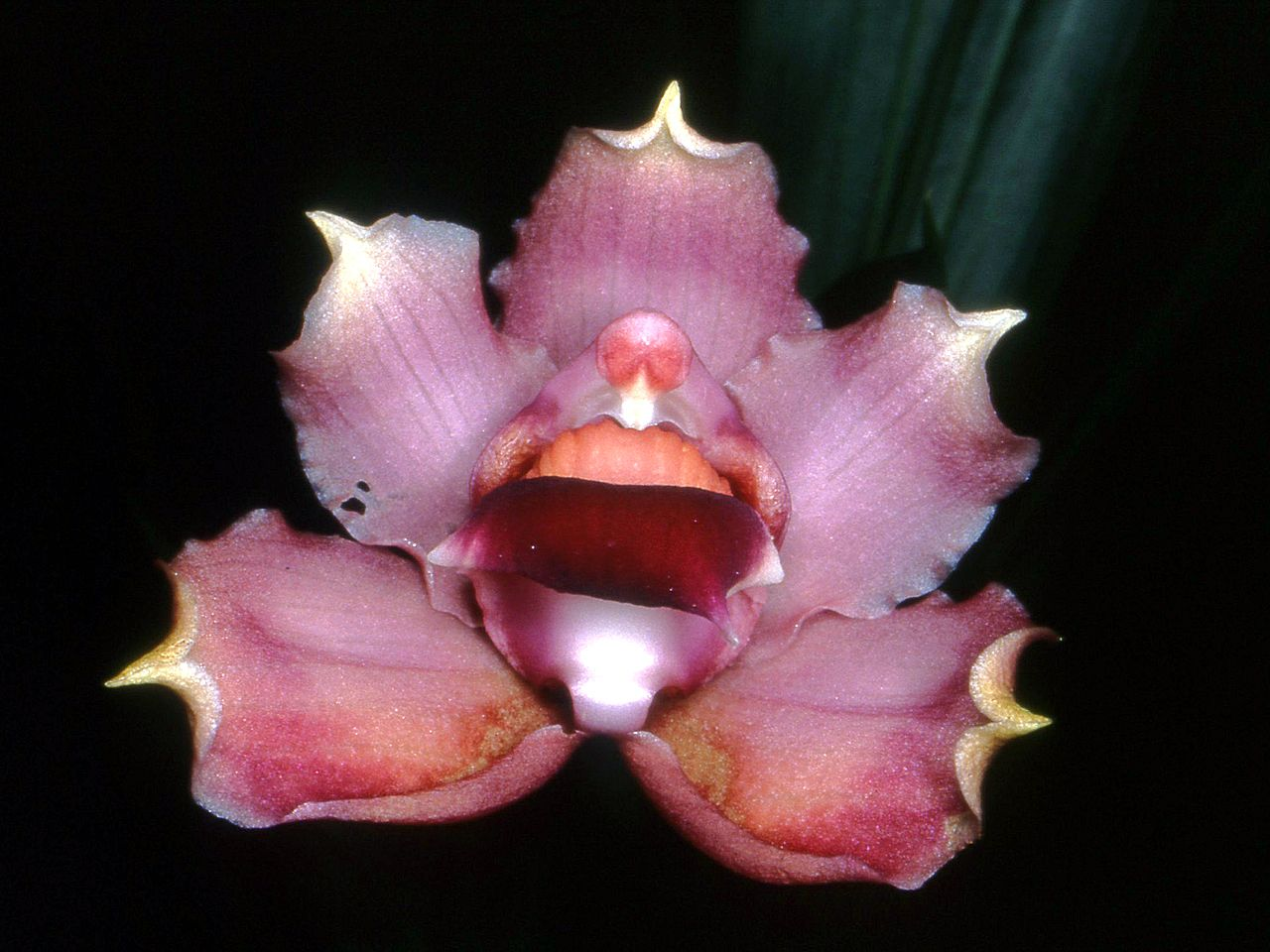
Pescatoria pulvinaris

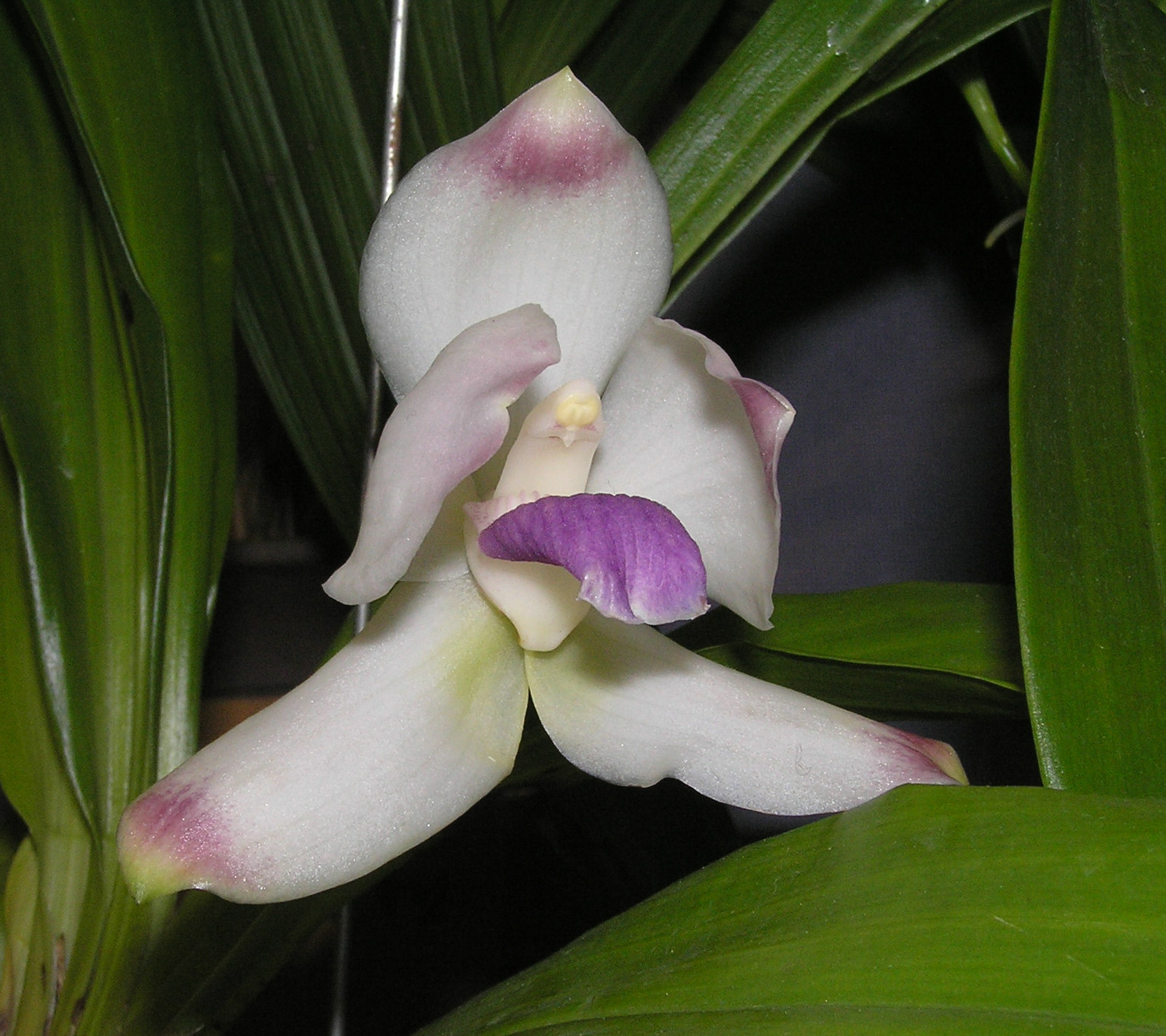
Pescatoria wallisii

== See also ==
- List of Orchidaceae genera
