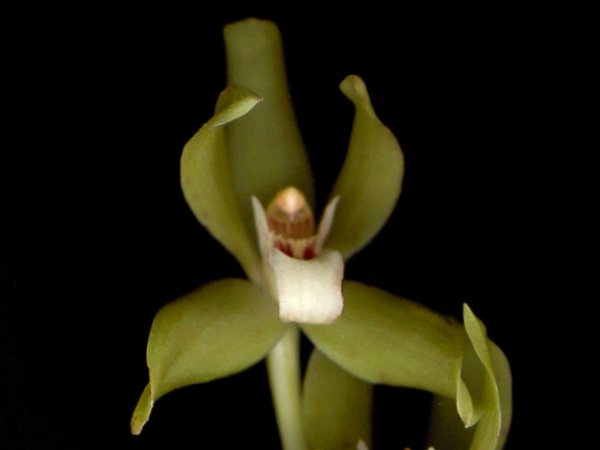

Scientific classification
- Kingdom: Plantae
- Clade: Tracheophytes
- Clade: Angiosperms
- Clade: Monocots
- Order: Asparagales
- Family: Orchidaceae
- Subfamily: Epidendroideae
- Tribe: Cymbidieae
- Subtribe: Zygopetalinae
- Genus: Neogardneria; Schltr. ex Garay
- Species: N. murrayana

Binomial name
- Neogardneria murrayana (Gardner ex Hook.) Schltr. ex Garay

Synonyms
- Zygopetalum murrayanum Gardner ex Hook; Eulophia murrayana (Gardner ex Hook.) Steud.; Zygopetalum binotii De Wild.; Neogardneria binotii (De Wild.) Hoehne

= Neogardneria =

Genus of orchids

Neogardneria is a genus of flowering plants from the orchid family, Orchidaceae. It contains one known species, Neogardneria murrayana, endemic to Brazil.

== See also ==
- List of Orchidaceae genera
