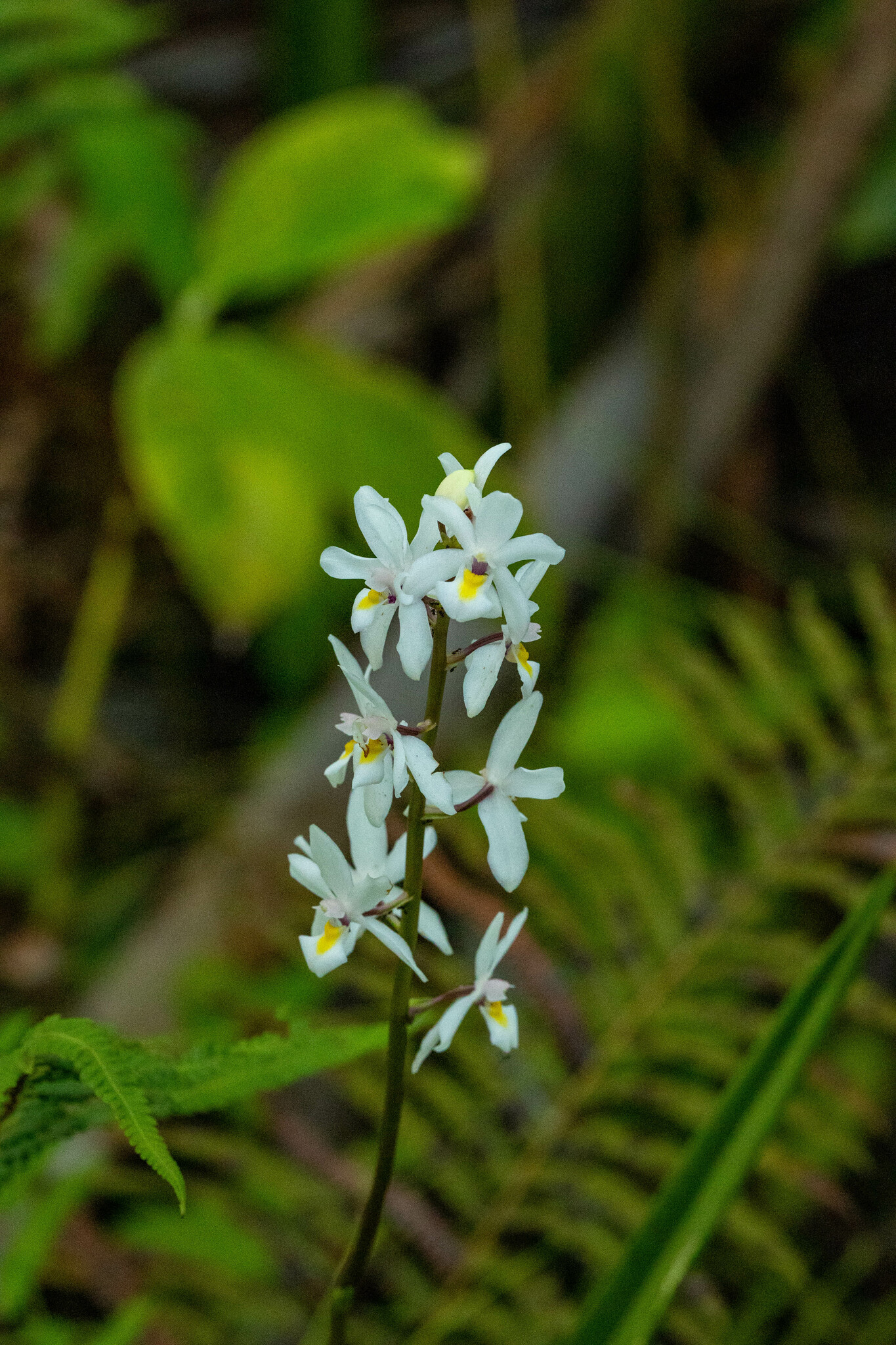
- Otostylis brachystalix

Scientific classification
- Kingdom: Plantae
- Clade: Embryophytes
- Clade: Tracheophytes
- Clade: Spermatophytes
- Clade: Angiosperms
- Clade: Monocots
- Order: Asparagales
- Family: Orchidaceae
- Subfamily: Epidendroideae
- Tribe: Cymbidieae
- Subtribe: Zygopetalinae
- Genus: Otostylis; Schltr.

= Otostylis =

Genus of orchids

Otostylis is a genus of flowering plants from the orchid family, Orchidaceae, native to South America and Trinidad.

- Otostylis alba (Ridl.) Summerh. - Venezuela, Brazil, Guyana
- Otostylis brachystalix (Rchb.f.) Schltr. - Venezuela, Brazil, Guyana, Trinidad, Colombia, Peru
- Otostylis lepida (Linden & Rchb.f.) Schltr. - Venezuela, Brazil, Guyana, Suriname
- Otostylis paludosa (Cogn.) Schltr. - Peru, Mato Grosso

== See also ==
- List of Orchidaceae genera
