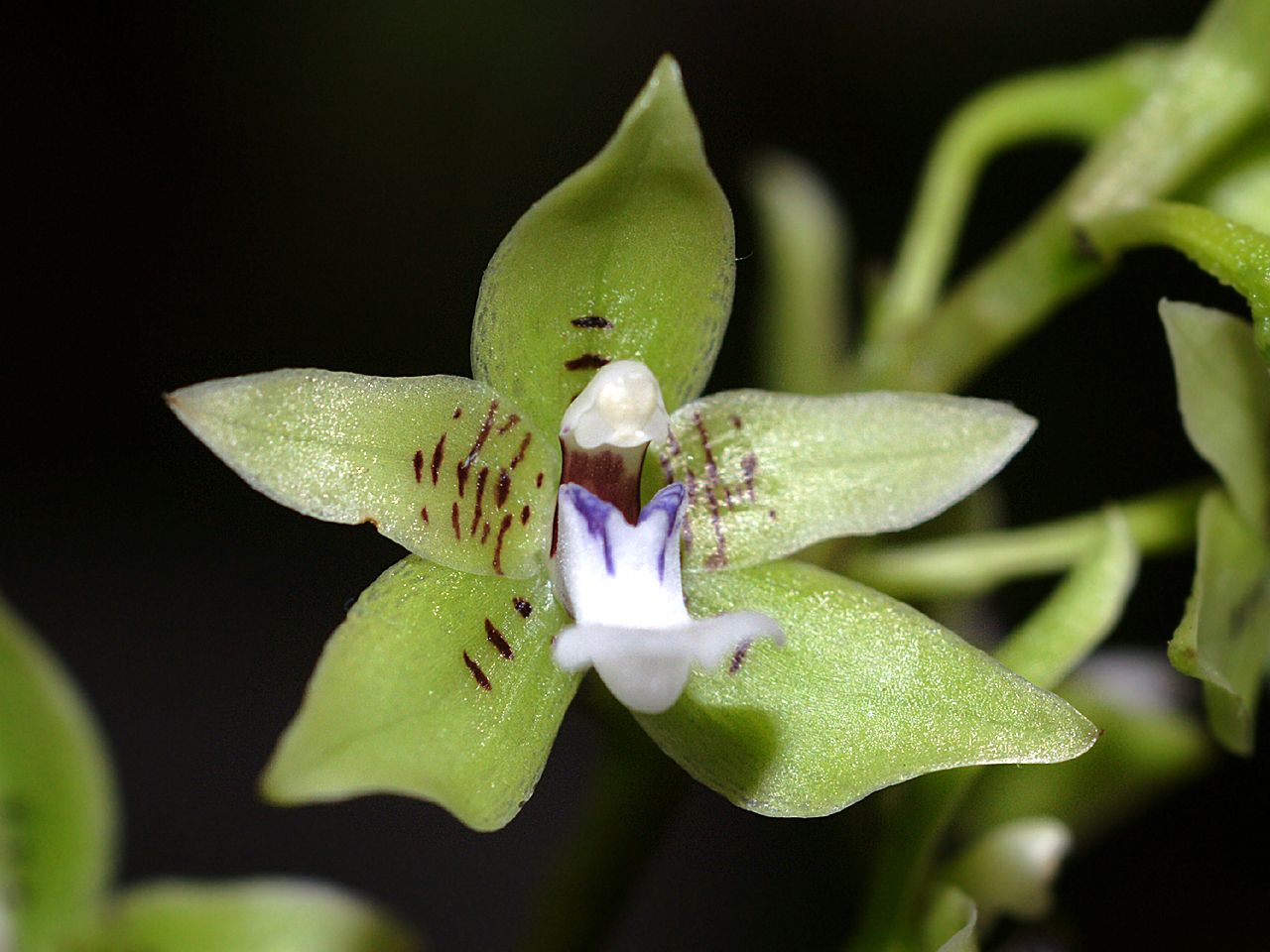
- Paradisanthus micranthus

Scientific classification
- Kingdom: Plantae
- Clade: Tracheophytes
- Clade: Angiosperms
- Clade: Monocots
- Order: Asparagales
- Family: Orchidaceae
- Subfamily: Epidendroideae
- Tribe: Cymbidieae
- Subtribe: Zygopetalinae
- Genus: Paradisanthus; Rchb. f.

= Paradisanthus =

Genus of orchids

Paradisanthus is a genus of flowering plants from the orchid family, Orchidaceae. It contains 4 known species, all endemic to Brazil.

- Paradisanthus bahiensis Rchb.f.
- Paradisanthus micranthus (Barb.Rodr.) Schltr.
- Paradisanthus mosenii Rchb.f.
- Paradisanthus neglectus Schltr.

== See also ==
- List of Orchidaceae genera
