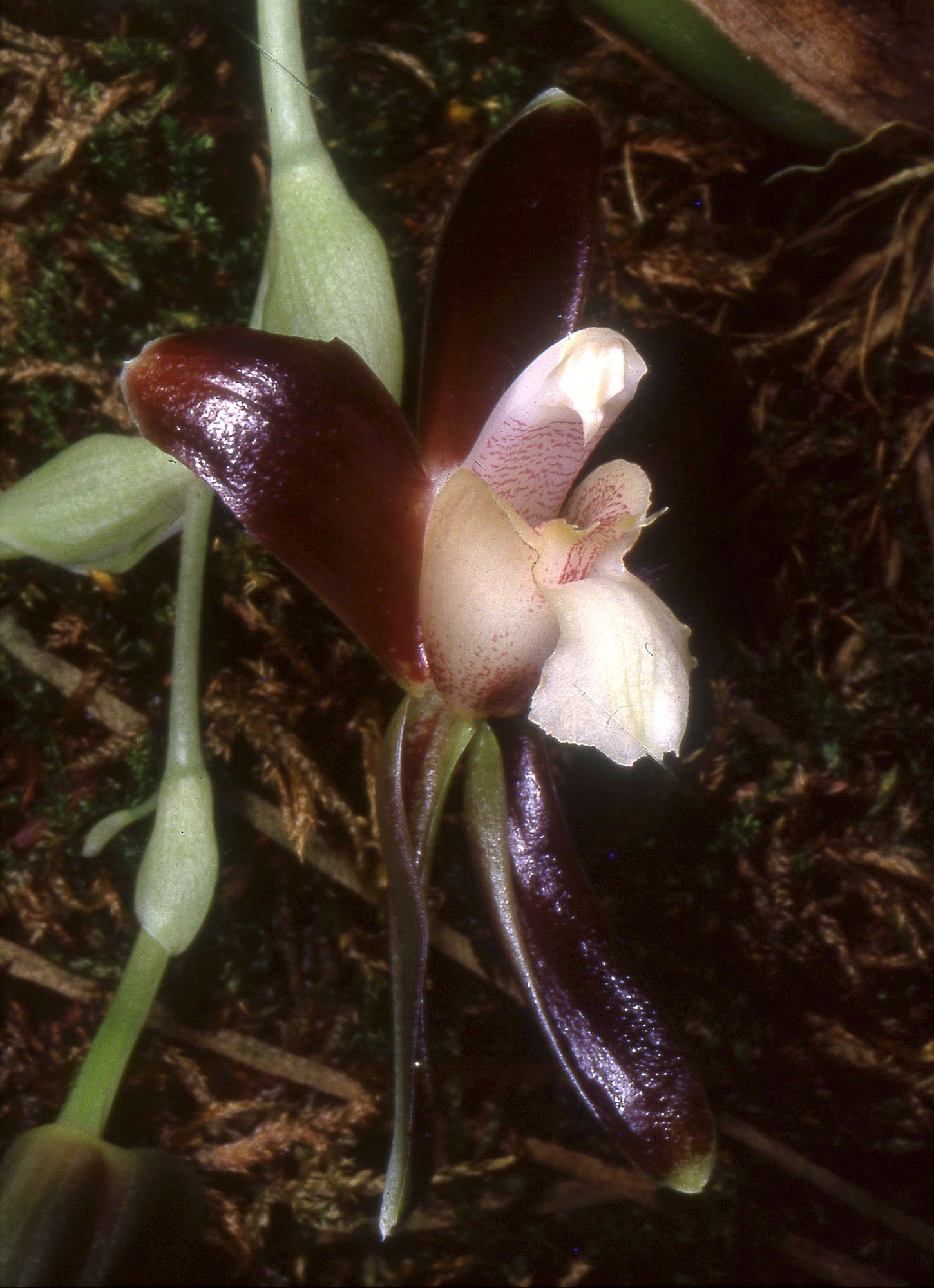
- Batemannia colleyi

Scientific classification
- Kingdom: Plantae
- Clade: Tracheophytes
- Clade: Angiosperms
- Clade: Monocots
- Order: Asparagales
- Family: Orchidaceae
- Subfamily: Epidendroideae
- Tribe: Cymbidieae
- Subtribe: Zygopetalinae
- Genus: Batemannia; Lindl.

Synonyms
- Petronia Barb.Rodr.

= Batemannia =

Genus of orchids

Batemannia is a genus of flowering plants from the orchid family, Orchidaceae.

It contains 5 species, native to Trinidad and South America:

- Batemannia armillata Rchb.f - Suriname, Colombia, Ecuador, Peru
- Batemannia colleyi Lindl. - Trinidad, French Guinea, Suriname, Guyana, Venezuela, Colombia, Ecuador, Peru, Bolivia, Brazil
- Batemannia leferenzii Senghas - Bolivia
- Batemannia lepida Rchb.f. - Suriname, Venezuela, Brazil
- Batemannia wolteriana Schltr. - Peru

== See also ==
- List of Orchidaceae genera
