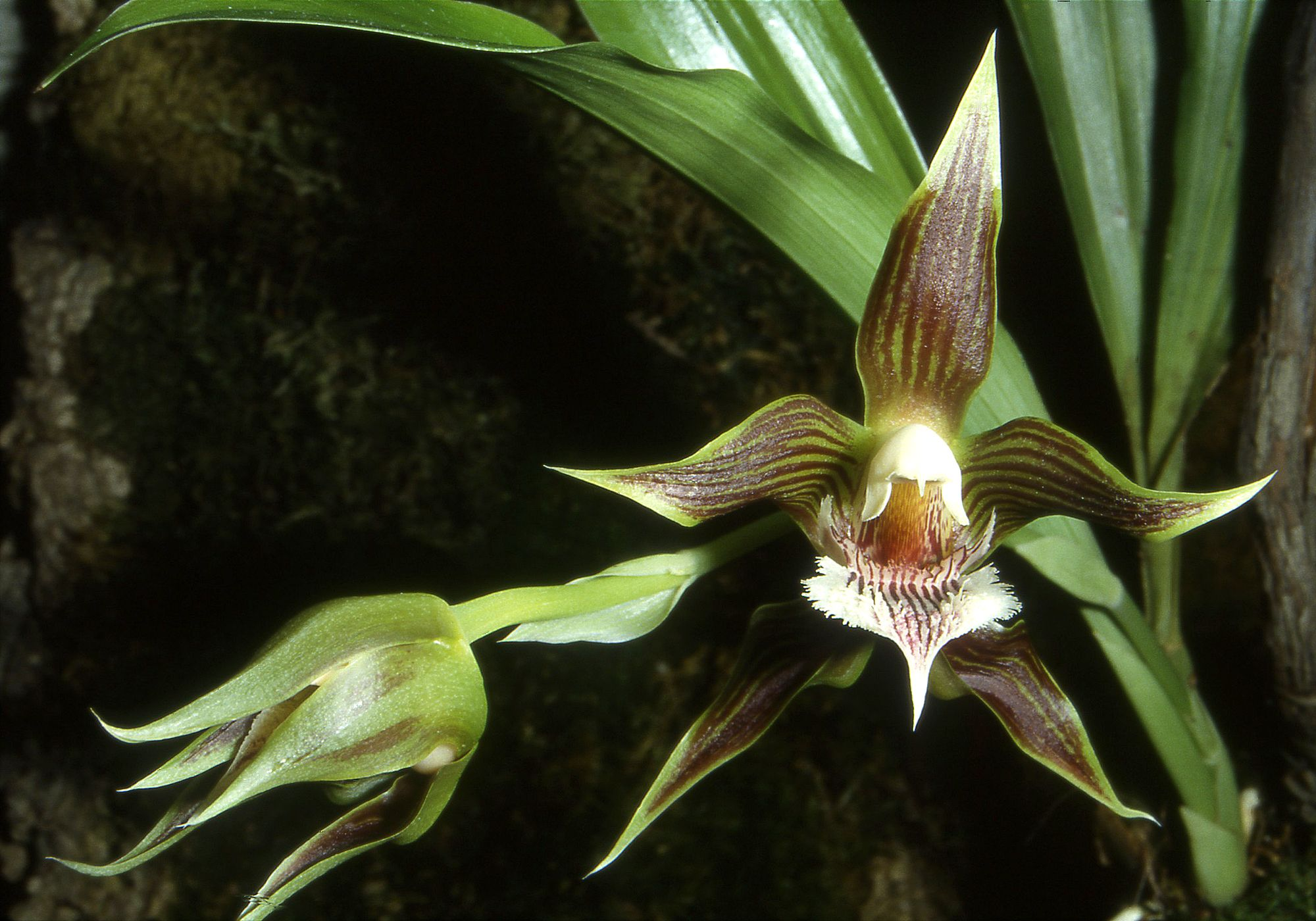
- Galeottia grandiflora (type species)

Scientific classification
- Kingdom: Plantae
- Clade: Tracheophytes
- Clade: Angiosperms
- Clade: Monocots
- Order: Asparagales
- Family: Orchidaceae
- Subfamily: Epidendroideae
- Tribe: Cymbidieae
- Subtribe: Zygopetalinae
- Genus: Galeottia; A.Rich.

Synonyms
- Mendoncella A.D.Hawkes, superfluous illegitimate name

= Galeottia =

Genus of orchids

Galeottia is a genus of flowering plants from the orchid family, Orchidaceae. It is native to South America, Central America and southern Mexico.

- Galeottia acuminata (C.Schweinf.) Dressler & Christenson
- Galeottia antioquiana (Kraenzl.) Dressler & Christenson
- Galeottia burkei (Rchb.f.) Dressler & Christenson
- Galeottia ciliata (C.Morel) Dressler & Christenson
- Galeottia colombiana (Garay) Dressler & Christenson
- Galeottia fimbriata (Linden & Rchb.f.) Schltr.
- Galeottia grandiflora A.Rich.
- Galeottia jorisiana (Rolfe) Schltr.
- Galeottia marginata (Garay) Dressler & Christenson
- Galeottia negrensis Schltr.
- Galeottia peruviana D.E.Benn. & Christenson
- Galeottia prainiana (Rolfe) Dressler & Christenson

== See also ==
- List of Orchidaceae genera
