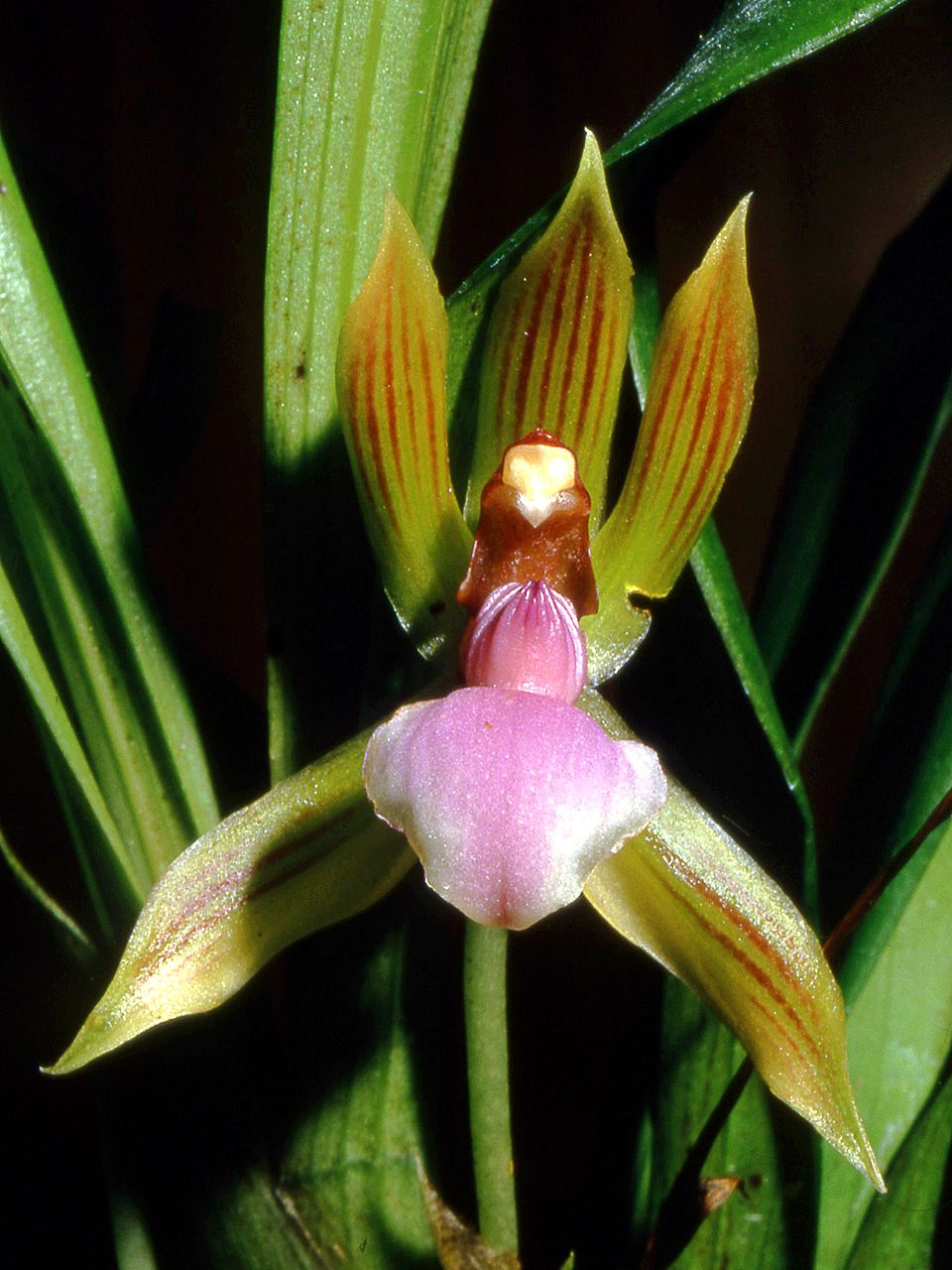
- Chaubardia heteroclita

Scientific classification
- Kingdom: Plantae
- Clade: Tracheophytes
- Clade: Angiosperms
- Clade: Monocots
- Order: Asparagales
- Family: Orchidaceae
- Subfamily: Epidendroideae
- Tribe: Cymbidieae
- Subtribe: Zygopetalinae
- Genus: Chaubardia; Rchb.f.

Synonyms
- Andinorchis Szlach., Mytnik & Górniak

= Chaubardia =

Genus of orchids

Chaubardia is a genus of flowering plants from the orchid family, Orchidaceae. It contains 3 recognized species, all endemic to South America.

- Chaubardia heteroclita (Poepp. & Endl.) Dodson & D.E.Benn. - Ecuador, Peru, Bolivia
- Chaubardia klugii (C.Schweinf.) Garay - Ecuador, Peru, Bolivia, Brazil, Colombia
- Chaubardia surinamensis Rchb.f. - Ecuador, Peru, Bolivia, Brazil, Colombia, Venezuela, Guyana, Suriname, French Guiana

== See also ==
- List of Orchidaceae genera
