= Louis Athanase Chaubard =

French botanist and naturalist

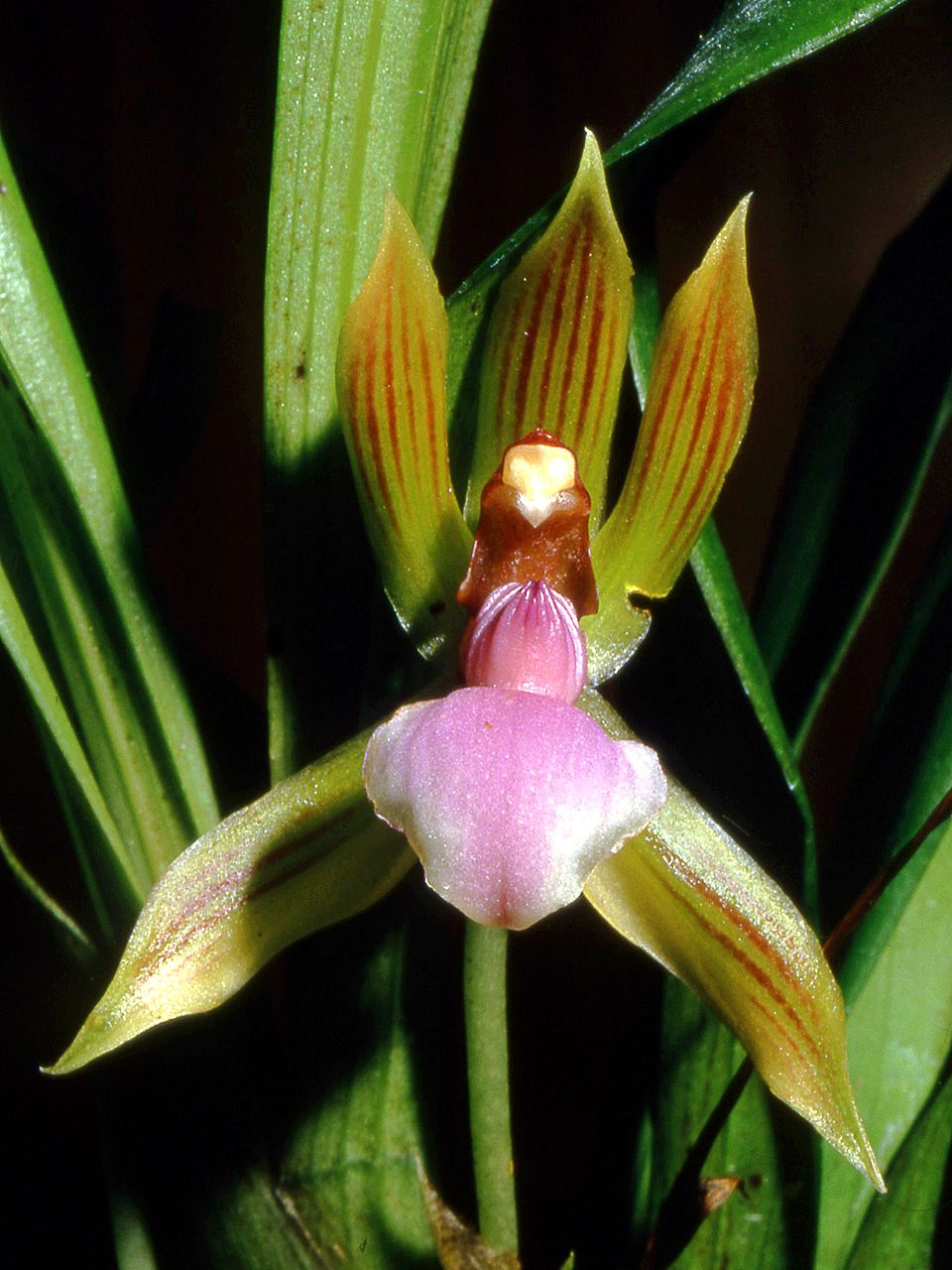
Chaubardia heteroclita Orchi, a part of the genus named in Chaubard's honour

Louis Athanase Chaubard (18 March 1781 in Agen – 1854) was a French botanist and naturalist.

== Contributions ==
With Jean Baptiste Bory de Saint-Vincent (1778-1846), he was co-author of Nouvelle Flore du Péloponèse et des Cyclades (New flora of the Pelopennesus and the Cyclades). He also made contributions to Jean Florimond Boudon de Saint-Amans' Flore agenaise ou description méthodique des plantes observées dans le département de Lot-et-Garonne, etc. Other noted works by Chaubard are:

- Éléments de Géologie mis à la portée de tout le monde et offrant la concordance ds faits géologiques avec les faits historiques tels qu'ils se trouvent dans la Bible, les traditions égyptiennes et les fables de la Grèce, Paris, Risler, 1833, second edition 1838 - Elements of geology placed within the reach of everyone and in concordance with the geological and historical facts, as found in the Bible, Egyptian traditions and fables of Greece.
- Notice géologique sur les terrains du département de Lot-et-Garonne (Ancien Agenais), Paris, 1930.
- L'Univers expliqué par la révélation, ou Essai de philosophie positive, Paris, Debéourt, Baillière et l'Auteur, 1841 - The universe explained by revelation, or test positive philosophy.

== Recognition ==
The plant genus Chaubardia (family Orchidaceae) is named in his honor.
