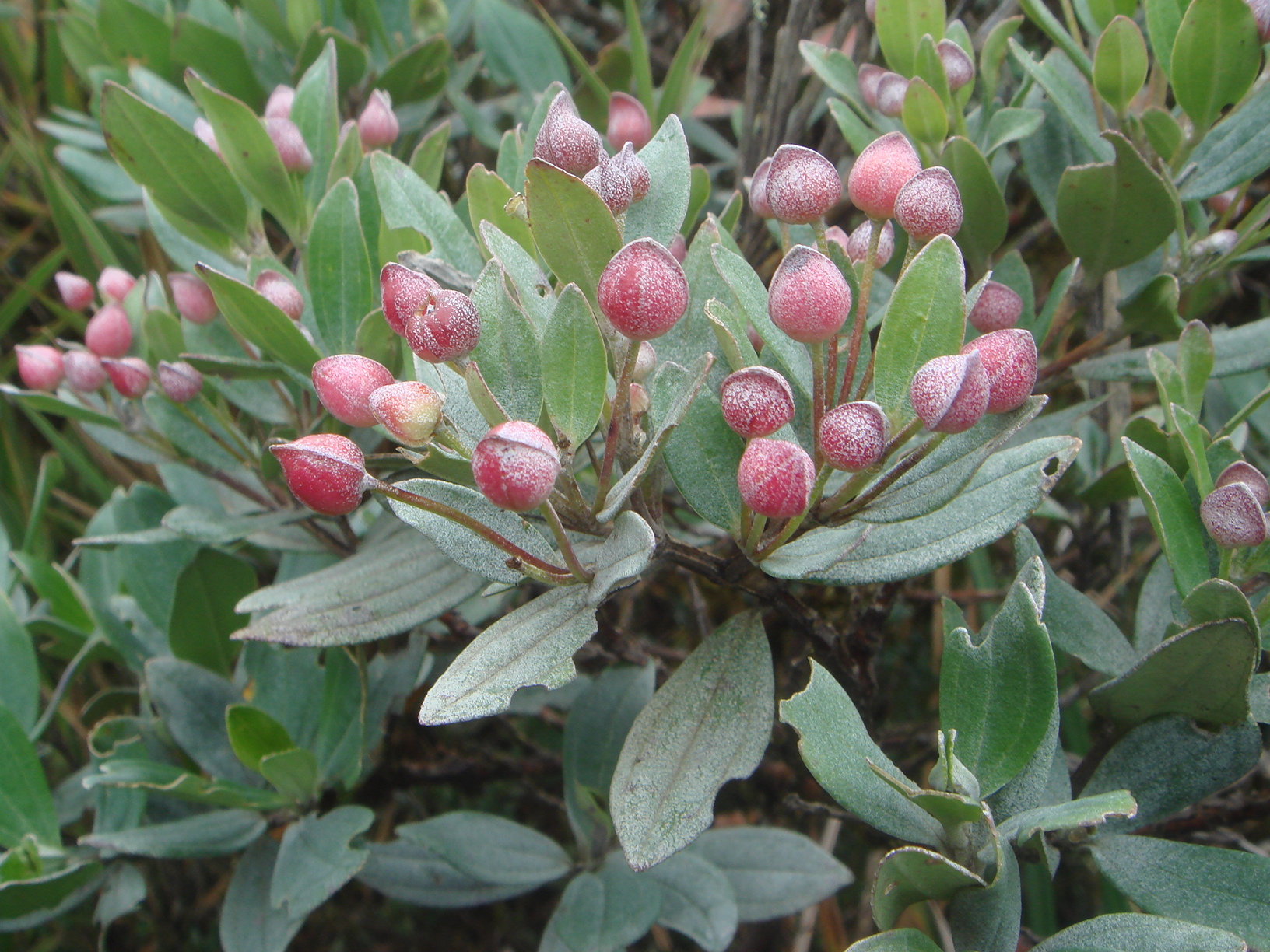
- Bucquetia glutinosa

Scientific classification
- Kingdom: Plantae
- Clade: Tracheophytes
- Clade: Angiosperms
- Clade: Eudicots
- Clade: Rosids
- Order: Myrtales
- Family: Melastomataceae
- Genus: Bucquetia; DC.

= Bucquetia =

Genus of flowering plants

Bucquetia is a genus of plant in family Melastomataceae. It contains the following species:

- Bucquetia glutinosa (L.f.) DC.
- Bucquetia nigritella (Naudin) Triana
- Bucquetia vernicosa Gleason
